= Over a Barrel =

- My Little Pony: Friendship Is Magic episode
- A battle between the Appleloosans and the buffalo herd ensues.
- Episode no.: Season 1 Episode 21
- Directed by: Jayson Thiessen; James Wootton
- Written by: Dave Polsky
- Original air date: March 25, 2011
- Running time: 22 minutes

Episode chronology
← Previous "Green Isn't Your Color"	Next → "A Bird in the Hoof"
- My Little Pony: Friendship Is Magic season 1

"Over a Barrel" is the twenty-first episode of the first season of the animated television series My Little Pony: Friendship Is Magic. It originally aired on The Hub on March 25, 2011. The episode was written by Dave Polsky. In this episode, Applejack and her friends travel to the frontier town of Appleloosa to deliver an apple tree, where they become involved in a conflict between the town's pony settlers and a local buffalo tribe over land use rights.

== Plot ==
External videos
- Over a Barrel (full episode) — Official upload of the episode onto YouTube

Spike and the Mane Six ride an overnight train to the frontier town of Appleloosa so Applejack can deliver an apple tree named Bloomberg as a gift to her relatives. The next morning, a herd of buffalo stampedes alongside the train and launches an attack. Little Strongheart, a young female buffalo, disconnects the caboose containing Spike and Bloomberg and pushes it away in the opposite direction. The remaining ponies arrive in Appleloosa, and Applejack's cousin Braeburn gives them a tour of the town. He explains that the buffalo want all the apple trees removed, but the settler ponies depend on the orchard for their survival.

Meanwhile, Rainbow Dash and Pinkie Pie venture into the desert to rescue Spike and encounter the buffalo tribe, where they meet Little Strongheart. She apologizes for taking Spike and Bloomberg and explains that the tribe only wanted to prevent the settlers from expanding their orchard, which was planted on the buffalo's traditional stampeding grounds without permission. Chief Thunderhooves affirms that his people have used this path for generations as part of their heritage. The next morning, Little Strongheart accompanies the ponies back to Appleloosa to negotiate, but the discussion quickly devolves into a shouting match between the two sides.

Pinkie Pie attempts to resolve the conflict by performing a song-and-dance number about sharing and recognizing similarities between the groups ("You Got to Share, You Got to Care"), but fails to impress either side. Chief Thunderhooves declares that the townsfolk must uproot all apple trees by high noon the next day or the buffalo will destroy both the orchard and the town, while Appleloosa's sheriff replies that they will be ready to defend themselves. Both sides spend the day preparing for battle.

When high noon arrives, Chief Thunderhooves leads the buffalo charge against the fortified town and a battle ensues with the settler ponies throwing apple pies at the buffalo to stun them. During the chaos, Thunderhooves gets hit in the face by a stray pie and is impressed by its taste, which immediately stops the fighting. The chief proposes a compromise where the settlers keep their land and share their apple pies with the buffalo in exchange for creating a path through the orchard that allows the herd to continue their traditional stampede.

== Development ==
According to show creator Lauren Faust on her DeviantArt profile, the show staff worked with an "official Native Consultant on this episode and did revisions according to all his notes."

== Reception ==
Pinkie Pie climbs through the closing iris shot and holds it open so that she can exclaim "Hey! That's what I said!" Aaron Kashtan identified this fourth wall break as an example of Friendship Is Magic's use of metatextuality.

Sherilyn Connelly, the author of Ponyville Confidential, gave the episode a "C+" rating.

In a critical analysis of the episode, author Jen A. Blue wrote that "Over a Barrel" suffers from attempting to tell a story that cannot be told within the limitations of a My Little Pony episode. Blue compared the episode to a hypothetical musical set in Auschwitz (from Lindsey Ellis' explanation of why Disney's Song of the South is disturbing), writing that it takes "a horrifically violent period of American history, a time of genocide, biological warfare, and forced marches, and turns it into a pie fight." She identified an impossible contradiction in the episode's approach: while the show's core values of love, tolerance, and friendship obligate it to depict both sides as fully complex, the need to make the content suitable for children requires defanging the conflict, which Blue described as "incredibly disrespectful to the entire peoples systematically slaughtered." Blue acknowledged some positive elements, including the humor in the opening scenes and the portrayal of young representatives from both sides who are reluctant participants in their elders' conflicts. However, she criticized the buffalo as "pure obnoxious stereotype" and concluded that while the episode was not poorly executed, it failed because "this is an entirely wrong direction for the show to be taking," though she suggested this misstep may have been necessary for the series to learn from.

Alesha Davis, in a retrospective review for The Post, gave the episode a similar assessment to Blue's critique and described "Over a Barrel" as "the worst offender out of all of the episodes in all nine seasons" of the series. Davis wrote that the episode depicts ponies as colonizers who have taken over the buffalo's sacred lands, noting that the buffalo are "clearly supposed to represent native tribes" through visual elements such as the chief's feather headdress and the use of tipis. She criticized the episode's resolution where "both groups have 'good reason to use this land'" despite the buffalo having used the territory first, writing that the buffalo are "forced to share the land" and receive produce in return rather than having their territory restored. Davis expressed disappointment that "even the natives in this made-up world cannot get their land back" and that the ponies do not admit wrongdoing or return the land in full to the buffalo.

Kevin Fletcher, in his essay My Little Pony, Communalism and Feminist Politics, wrote that while the episode references the arrival of Euro-Americans in tribal lands, it "equivocates about the possession and 'discovery' of indigenous lands and therefore lacks an anti-colonialist critique." He observed that the visual environment corresponds to the Navajo Nation in the southwestern United States, but the buffalo are distinctive of other nations like the Lakota, which he described as a common trope in "white culture" of mixing cultural elements from different Native American groups. He also pointed to the episode's use of slapstick comedy and visual incongruity as contextual cues suggesting the content was not meant to be taken seriously and decried that the episode ultimately "glosses up the colonial story of westward expansion" and "perpetuates stereotypes often found in the depiction of Native Americans."

Christian Valiente and Xeno Rasmusson identified "Over a Barrel" as an example of females in authority positions in part of their study on challenges to traditional gender roles in Friendship is Magic.

Brendan Kachel of flayrah wrote that the episode was "pretty bad" and criticized its handling of the displacement of native peoples and manifest destiny as inappropriate for the medium. He argued that some topics "shouldn't be interpreted via the medium of glorified horse figurine commercial" and called the resolution insulting: "I'm just saying it's a problem that you can't solve with apple pie." Similarly, Ryan Lohner of The Agony Booth described the episode as one of the show's weaker outings and criticized it as a misguided attempt to teach kids about the horrors of manifest destiny.

Jamie Kingston of WomenWriteAboutComics criticized the portrayal of buffalo as analogous to Native Americans and wrote that while the episode was mostly handled well, the use of feathered war bonnets as visual identifiers contributed to the problematic idea that it's acceptable to appropriate Native American cultural symbols. Kingston pointed out that the conflict centers on settlers building a town on land the buffalo have used for generations, and while the dispute is resolved peacefully with a compromise rather than violence, the episode still contains problematic elements in its cultural representation.

In an essay analyzing the use of metatextuality in Friendship Is Magic, Aaron Kashtan examined how "Over a Barrel" features instances of fourth-wall breaking that are seemingly impossible within the fictional universe despite it featuring instances of magic. He identified a specific scene where Pinkie Pie climbs through the closing iris shot and holds it open so that she can exclaim "Hey! That's what I said!" Kashtan wrote that through such uses of metatextuality and reflexivity, the episode reminds viewers of the show's status as a constructed media artifact, thereby helping develop critical awareness of mediacy and materiality.

== Home media ==
The episode is part of the Season 1 DVD set, released by Shout Factory, on December 4, 2012.

== See also ==
- List of My Little Pony: Friendship Is Magic episodes
