= Winter Wrap Up =

- My Little Pony: Friendship Is Magic episode
- Twilight Sparkle (center) sings "Winter Wrap Up" with the residents of Ponyville.
- Episode no.: Season 1 Episode 11
- Directed by: Jayson Thiessen; James Wootton
- Written by: Cindy Morrow
- Original air date: December 24, 2010
- Running time: 22 minutes

Episode chronology
← Previous "Swarm of the Century"	Next → "Call of the Cutie"
- My Little Pony: Friendship Is Magic season 1

"Winter Wrap Up" is the eleventh episode of the first season of the animated television series My Little Pony: Friendship Is Magic. It originally aired on The Hub on December 24, 2010. The episode was written by Cindy Morrow. In this episode, Twilight Sparkle participates in Ponyville's annual "Winter Wrap-Up" tradition, where the ponies prepare the land for spring without using magic. When Twilight struggles to contribute without her magical abilities, she discovers her organizational skills are exactly what the town needs to coordinate the event successfully.

== Plot ==
External videos
- Winter Wrap Up (full episode) — Official upload of the episode onto YouTube

At the Golden Oak Library before dawn, Twilight Sparkle awakens with excitement and prepares to participate in Winter Wrap Up, an annual event where Ponyville residents manually changes the season from winter to spring without using any magic; Ponyville was founded by earth ponies and has maintained the tradition of completing the seasonal transition through physical labor alone.

Mayor Mare, the mayor of Ponyville, commences the cleanup with a speech and the ponies divide into three teams focused on weather, animals, and plants. Twilight feels uncertain about which team to join and attempts to help each group in turn, but her efforts consistently end in failure: she first goes to Rainbow Dash to help with weather work but is reminded that she lacks wings; she attempts to help Rarity build bird nests but creates a disaster; she tries to help Pinkie Pie score ice at the frozen lake but creates a skating mishap; and she attempts to help Fluttershy with waking hibernating animals, only for it to end badly as well.

Determined to contribute somehow, Twilight approaches Applejack and offers to help push one of the plows for clearing snow from the fields. When it becomes apparent that she lacks the physical strength for the task, Twilight casts a "come-to-life" spell on the plow per Spike's earlier suggestion. However, she quickly loses control of the plow and triggers an avalanche that undoes all the plow team's hard work. Applejack berates Twilight for breaking the town's tradition by using magic, and the distraught unicorn runs off in tears.

Later, while hiding dejectedly in a bush near the town square, Twilight overhears Applejack and Fluttershy issuing contradictory commands to Rainbow Dash about snow removal priorities. Mayor Mare chastises them for wasting precious time and laments the various organizational issues that have significantly slowed their progress throughout the day. Hearing this, Twilight emerges from her hiding spot and offers to help organize the entire operation, which the ponies accept. With Twilight's organizational skills, the ponies work efficiently enough to complete Winter Wrap Up on schedule, and Mayor Mare honors her by naming her the "All-Team Organizer" and presenting her with a unique vest that incorporates the colors of all three teams.

== Reception ==
In a critical analysis of the episode, author Jen A. Blue described "Winter Wrap Up" as "another solid but unspectacular effort" by writer Cindy Morrow, noting that while it featured one of the best songs of the season, credit for the musical number should be shared with composer Daniel Ingram. Blue argued that the episode represented part of what she saw as the show's "identity crisis" during the first season, calling it "a retreat into another slice-of-life episode with no antagonist" that demonstrated the series' uncertainty about its direction. She criticized the episode's thematic content, writing that "this episode has nothing to say, and its friendship lesson is one of the weakest yet," and concluded that while it was "a decent enough episode" that brought together elements that had worked in previous episodes, it exemplified a period when "the show itself is coming apart" despite the ponies' efforts to transition from winter to spring.

Sherilyn Connelly, the author of Ponyville Confidential, gave the episode a "B" rating.

Rae Grimes, writing in Comic Book Resources, ranked "Winter Wrap Up" as the second best song of Friendship Is Magic behind "This Day Aria".

== Home media ==
The episode is part of the Season 1 DVD set, released by Shout Factory, on December 4, 2012.

== See also ==
- List of My Little Pony: Friendship Is Magic episodes
