= A Bird in the Hoof =

- My Little Pony: Friendship Is Magic episode
- Princess Celestia (right) shows Fluttershy (left) a newly-reincarnated Philomena (center).
- Episode no.: Season 1 Episode 22
- Directed by: Jayson Thiessen; James Wootton
- Written by: Charlotte Fullerton
- Original air date: April 8, 2011
- Running time: 22 minutes

Episode chronology
← Previous "Over a Barrel"	Next → "The Cutie Mark Chronicles"
- My Little Pony: Friendship Is Magic season 1

"A Bird in the Hoof" is the twenty-second episode of the first season of the animated television series My Little Pony: Friendship Is Magic. It originally aired on The Hub on April 8, 2011. The episode was written by Charlotte Fullerton. In this episode, Fluttershy becomes concerned about the health of Princess Celestia's pet bird Philomena and secretly takes the bird to care for it.

== Plot ==
External videos
- A Bird in the Hoof (full episode) — Official upload of the episode onto YouTube

Fluttershy arrives at the bakery where the rest of her friends are already gathered with Princess Celestia. During their brunch together, Celestia introduces her pet bird Philomena, who appears sickly as she coughs and sheds feathers throughout the meal. When Mayor Mare, the mayor of Ponyville, requests an audience with the princess, Celestia leaves the bakery and accidentally leaves Philomena behind on the table.

Believing Philomena to be seriously ill, Fluttershy brings the bird back to her cottage to provide medical treatment and nurse her back to health, but none of her efforts work and Philomena's condition seems to worsen. Twilight arrives to thank Fluttershy for making a good impression at the brunch, but Twilight becomes horrified to discover that Fluttershy has taken the princess's pet without permission. Twilight insists they must return the bird immediately, but just as they prepare to leave, Celestia's guards arrive looking for the missing pet. The guards leave after the girls feign ignorance about Philomena's whereabouts, but Twilight worries that they could be banished if they are caught and suggests they cure the bird first before returning her. However, Philomena becomes fed up with their increasingly forceful treatments and flees the cottage, so Twilight and Fluttershy chase her around town while avoiding the royal guards. They eventually lose track of the bird until one of the guards spots her atop a fountain statue just as her last feather falls off. Philomena staggers and falls to the ground where she bursts into flames and disintegrates into a pile of ash in Fluttershy's hooves.

Princess Celestia arrives and demands to know what happened, and Fluttershy admits that she took the bird to treat it. However, Celestia tells the pile of ash to "stop fooling around", and immediately, the ashes swirl into the air and transform into a large, beautiful flame-colored bird. Celestia reveals that Philomena's molting and sickly appearance were simply part of her natural cycle of renewal rather than signs of illness. Fluttershy promises to ask for permission next time before taking matters into her own hands, while the princess reassures her that she will not face punishment for her well-intentioned mistake.

== Reception ==
Sherilyn Connelly, the author of Ponyville Confidential, gave the episode a "B-" rating. In her review of the episode in SF Weekly, Connelly humorously remarked that when Fluttershy asks Princess Celestia whether she should turn the lesson she learned in the episode into a friendship letter, "even Celestia's a little over [the friendship letters], and it will change in Season 2. Thankfully."

In a critical analysis of the episode, author Jen A. Blue described "A Bird in the Hoof" as a subversion of the rebirth motif that had been recurring throughout the first season ("Swarm of the Century" and "Suited for Success"). Blue wrote that while Philomena undergoes a literal physical transformation as a phoenix, the characters themselves remain unchanged, which she characterized as "a very postmodern thing to do" that calls the entire rebirth motif into question. Blue analyzed the episode as a critique of the misapplication of kindness, arguing that it demonstrates how "intent is not magic" and that true kindness requires understanding others' actual needs rather than simply acting on good intentions. Blue observed Fluttershy's character progression from timidity to increased assertiveness, and commented that the episode shows how well-meaning actions without proper communication can cause harm. Blue drew parallels between Philomena's situation and that of children who cannot effectively communicate their needs, with Fluttershy representing well-intentioned caregivers who may cause distress despite their good intentions.

== Home media ==
The episode is part of the Season 1 DVD set, released by Shout Factory, on December 4, 2012.

== See also ==
- List of My Little Pony: Friendship Is Magic episodes
