= My Little Pony: Friendship Is Magic season 1 =

My Little Pony: Friendship Is Magic
- Season 1
- DVD cover
- Starring: Tara Strong; Tabitha St. Germain; Ashleigh Ball; Andrea Libman; Cathy Weseluck
- No. of episodes: 26

Release
- Original network: The Hub
- Original release: February 10, 2010 – May 6, 2011

Season chronology
- Next → Season 2

The first season of the animated television series My Little Pony: Friendship Is Magic, developed by Lauren Faust, originally aired on The Hub in the United States. The series is based on Hasbro's My Little Pony line of toys and animated works and is often referred by collectors to be the fourth generation, or "G4", of the My Little Pony franchise. Season 1 of the series premiered on October 10, 2010 on The Hub, an American pay television channel partly owned by Hasbro, and concluded on May 6, 2011.

The show follows a studious unicorn pony named Twilight Sparkle as her mentor Princess Celestia guides her to learn about friendship in the town of Ponyville. Twilight becomes close friends with five other ponies: Applejack, Rarity, Fluttershy, Rainbow Dash, and Pinkie Pie, as they all teach each other the magic of friendship. Each of the ponies represent a different facet of friendship, and Twilight soon discovers herself to be a key part of the "Elements of Harmony", ancient artifacts with powerful magic properties. The ponies share adventures and help out the residents of Ponyville, while working out the troublesome moments in their own friendships.

== Development ==
Hasbro selected animator Lauren Faust as the creative director and executive producer for the show. Faust sought to challenge the established "girly" nature of the existing My Little Pony line, creating more in-depth characters and adventurous settings, incorporating Hasbro's suggestions for E/I ("educational and informational") content and marketing of the toy line.

== Cast ==
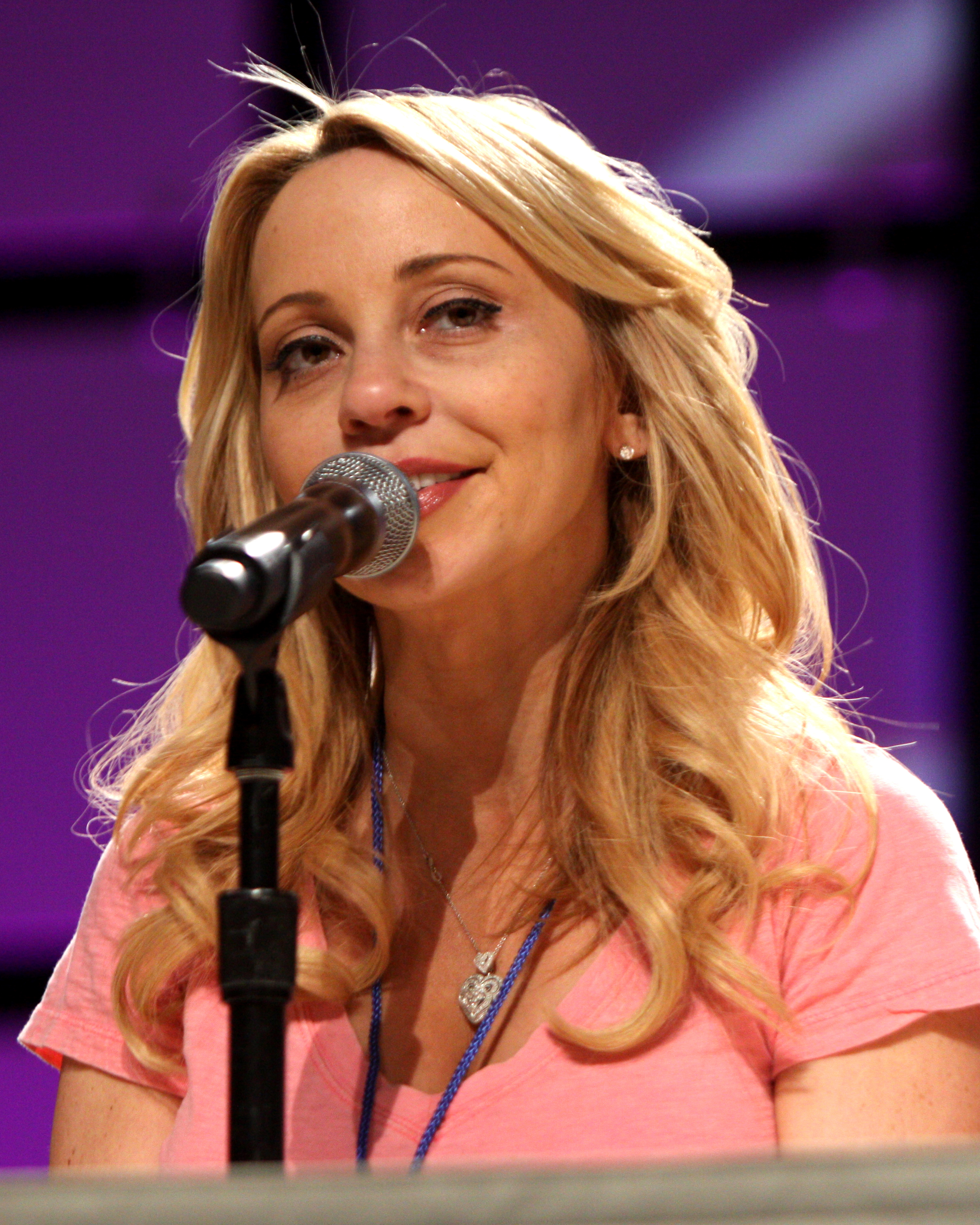
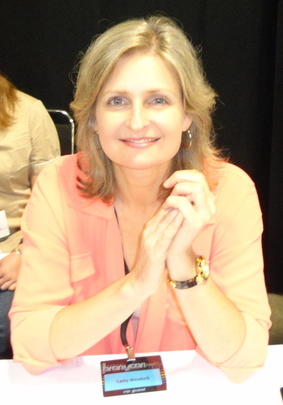
The series employs the voice acting talents of Tara Strong and Cathy Weseluck, among others.

=== Main ===
- Tara Strong as Twilight Sparkle
  - Rebecca Shoichet as Twilight Sparkle (singing voice)
- Tabitha St. Germain as Rarity
  - Kazumi Evans as Rarity (singing voice)
- Ashleigh Ball as Applejack and Rainbow Dash
- Andrea Libman as Fluttershy and Pinkie Pie
  - Shannon Chan-Kent as Pinkie Pie (singing voice); Libman occasionally
- Cathy Weseluck as Spike

=== Recurring ===
- Nicole Oliver as Princess Celestia
- The Cutie Mark Crusaders
  - Michelle Creber as Apple Bloom
  - Madeleine Peters as Scootaloo
  - Claire Corlett as Sweetie Belle
    - Michelle Creber as Sweetie Belle (singing voice)

=== Minor ===
- Peter New as Big McIntosh
- Tabitha St. Germain as Princess Luna/Nightmare Moon, Granny Smith, Mrs. Cake, Photo Finish, and Philomena
- Kelly Metzger as Spitfire
- Matt Hill as Soarin
- Cathy Weseluck as Mayor Mare and Golden Harvest
- Nicole Oliver as Cheerilee, Spitfire ("Sonic Rainboom" only)
- Brian Drummond as Mr. Cake
- Chantal Strand as Diamond Tiara and Bon Bon
- Shannon Chan-Kent as Silver Spoon
- Brenda Crichlow as Zecora
- Richard Ian Cox as Snails
- Lee Tockar as Snips

=== Guest stars ===
- Lee Tockar as Steven Magnet
- Maryke Hendrikse as Gilda
- Kathleen Barr as Trixie and Hoops
- Blu Mankuma as "Flutterguy"
- Trevor Devall as Hoity Toity
- Rena Anakwe as Sapphire Shores
- The Diamond Dogs:
  - Scott McNeil as Rover
  - Garry Chalk as Fido
  - Lee Tockar as Spot
- Michael Daingerfield Hall as Braeburn
- Erin Mathews as Little Strongheart
- Scott McNeil as Chief Thunderhooves
- Vincent Tong as Pony Joe and Prince Blueblood
- James Wootton as Mule

== Episodes ==
Each episode is directed by Jayson Thiessen with James Wootton as co-director.

No. overall	No. in season	Title	Written by	Original release date	Prod. code
1	1	"Friendship Is Magic" (Note: Part 1 listed as "Mare in the Moon" on Hasbro's website.) (Note: Part 2 listed as "Elements of Harmony" on Hasbro's website.) (Parts 1 & 2)	Lauren Faust	October 10, 2010	101
2	2	"Friendship Is Magic" (Parts 1 & 2)	Lauren Faust	October 22, 2010	102
Part 1: In the magical land of Equestria, a studious, asocial unicorn named Twilight Sparkle learns of a prophecy that states the evil Nightmare Moon will return during the upcoming Summer Sun Celebration after a thousand years imprisoned in the moon. She tries to warn her mentor Princess Celestia, the benevolent alicorn ruler of Equestria, of the impending danger, but she dismisses her warnings and sends her with her baby dragon assistant Spike to Ponyville to supervise the preparations for the celebration and make some friends. As a result, Twilight reluctantly meets five ponies in charge of the preparations: Applejack, a country earth pony who works on her family's apple farm; Rainbow Dash, a tomboyish pegasus who helps control the weather; Rarity, a glamorous unicorn who designs fashion; Fluttershy, a shy pegasus who communicates with animals; and Pinkie Pie, a hyperactive earth pony who loves throwing parties. At the celebration, Nightmare Moon appears and decrees everlasting night. Part 2: After Nightmare Moon decrees eternal night, Twilight and her new friends venture deep into the Everfree Forest to find the Elements of Harmony, a set of magical relics used to defeat Nightmare Moon in the past. Nightmare Moon creates obstacles to stop them, but each pony helps the group overcome them using her own strengths. Once they find the Elements, Nightmare Moon appears and shatters them. Twilight realizes that she and her new friends represent the six Elements: Honesty (Applejack), Kindness (Fluttershy), Laughter (Pinkie Pie), Generosity (Rarity), Loyalty (Rainbow Dash) and Magic (herself), and they wield them to defeat Nightmare Moon, returning her to her original form as Princess Celestia's younger sister, Princess Luna. Celestia returns, revealing she knew of Nightmare Moon's return and sent Twilight to Ponyville to make friends so she can have the power to defeat her. She then forgives Luna and allows Twilight to stay in Ponyville in order to continue studying the magic of friendship.
3	3	"The Ticket Master"	Amy Keating Rogers & Lauren Faust	October 29, 2010	103
Princess Celestia sends Twilight two tickets for the upcoming exclusive Grand Galloping Gala. Upon learning of the tickets, each of Twilight's friends insists she should be the one to go with her, and they start giving her special treatment to earn her favor. Twilight is unwilling to pick any one friend over another and she politely returns the tickets to Celestia despite her friends' apologies for their selfishness. To everypony's surprise, Celestia replies by sending back enough tickets for Twilight and all of her friends.
4	4	"Applebuck Season"	Amy Keating Rogers	November 5, 2010	104
Apple harvesting season is upon Sweet Apple Acres, but with her brother Big McIntosh injured, the task of bucking apples from their trees falls upon Applejack herself. Applejack insists she can do it herself, and stubbornly refuses to let her friends help. She quickly becomes weary from the work, but still upholds promises to help with other tasks around town. In her sleep-deprived daze, her assistance goes awry and wreaks havoc on Ponyville. Twilight intervenes, telling Applejack that her stubbornness has caused a myriad of problems and she needs help. When Applejack sees she only harvested half of the apples, she finally gives in and asks for her friends' help, which make the harvest more efficient.
5	5	"Griffon the Brush Off"	Cindy Morrow	November 12, 2010	105
Pinkie Pie and Rainbow Dash discover they share a common interest in playing harmless pranks on other ponies. Later, Rainbow Dash's childhood friend Gilda, a griffin, arrives and Pinkie finds herself left out of Rainbow Dash and Gilda's activities. When Pinkie sees Gilda bullying other ponies around town, she becomes determined to cheer her up with a party. At the party, Gilda becomes the victim of several pranks, for which she blames Pinkie, but Rainbow Dash admits to setting up the pranks. Gilda becomes frustrated and flies off, leaving Rainbow Dash to reaffirm her friendship with Pinkie.
6	6	"Boast Busters"	Chris Savino	November 19, 2010	106
While Twilight practices her magic skills, a unicorn magician called "The Great and Powerful" Trixie arrives in Ponyville and boasts about being a powerful unicorn, outdoing stunts performed by Twilight's friends with her magic. Spike tries to get Twilight to stand up for her friends, but she refuses, believing the rest of town will hate her due to her own powerful magic. In an attempt to prove Trixie's power to Spike, the colts Snips and Snails lure a giant "Ursa Minor" bear into town for her to vanquish. Trixie tries to stop the bear, but her magic is too weak. Instead, Twilight is able to use her own magic to lull the bear to sleep and return it to its cave. As Trixie flees, the town thanks Twilight for her help, and she realizes they have already accepted her magical talent.
7	7	"Dragonshy"	Meghan McCarthy	November 26, 2010	107
A dragon has taken shelter in a nearby cave, and his smoky breath threatens to cover Ponyville. Twilight and her friends are tasked with removing the dragon, specifically expecting that Fluttershy's affinity with animals will be useful. However, as they make the trek up the mountain, Fluttershy reveals her paralyzing fear of dragons, making the journey difficult for the others. At the cave, Fluttershy refuses to enter, and the others try their own means to evict the dragon, only to get knocked against a rock, hurting them in the process. Fluttershy becomes enraged and scolds the dragon for hurting her friends, causing the dragon to cower and cry in shame. Fluttershy asks the dragon to leave of his own accord, leaving Ponyville smoke-free.
8	8	"Look Before You Sleep"	Charlotte Fullerton	December 3, 2010	108
Applejack and Rarity have an argument over their respective approaches to work as they prepare for a thunderstorm. Their arguing causes them to be stuck outside when the storm hits, but Twilight invites them into the library to spend the night. Twilight decides to throw her first slumber party, much to Applejack and Rarity's regret. The hostility between them increases with each activity, with Twilight oblivious to the conflict. As they prepare to go to sleep, a lightning bolt threatens to send a tree branch into a nearby home. Applejack lassos it in time to stop it, accidentally dragging it into Twilight's bedroom in the process. Between the mess, Applejack and Rarity work together to get rid of the branch and clean up the mess, overcoming their differences. They later apologize to each other, and enjoy the rest of the slumber party with Twilight.
9	9	"Bridle Gossip"	Amy Keating Rogers	December 10, 2010	109
Twilight finds out that the rest of Ponyville are frightened of the mysterious zebra Zecora who lives in the Everfree Forest, and insists their fears are unfounded. An encouraged Apple Bloom follows Zecora to her home, and the others quickly follow once they notice her missing. They recover Apple Bloom just as she enters a field of blue flowers, where Zecora warns them off. The next day, Twilight and her friends find themselves suffering from strange problems, leading the others to conclude that Zecora has cursed them. They find Apple Bloom missing again, and assume that Zecora took her. They race to Zecora's hut and confront her, only to find her and Apple Bloom making a potion to cure them of the afflictions, which were caused by the Poison Joke flowers they had stepped in the day before. Once cured, Twilight and her friends convince the townsfolk to be more trusting of Zecora.
10	10	"Swarm of the Century"	M.A. Larson	December 17, 2010	110
While Twilight anxiously prepares Ponyville for a visit by Princess Celestia, Fluttershy finds a cute creature called a Parasprite and takes it back into town. The other ponies are enraptured by the creature despite its strange ability to reproduce quickly, and each adopt their own except for Pinkie Pie, who immediately starts to look for musical instruments. The next day, Ponyville is flooded with Parasprites that have begun eating everything in town. Twilight and the others try to get rid of them without success, and are frustrated by Pinkie's search for instruments. As the Parasprites start eating the town itself, Pinkie arrives as a one-pony band and leads the creatures out of town just as Celestia arrives. With the town emptied of Parasprites, Twilight and her friends apologize to Pinkie for doubting her behavior and promise to listen to her ideas and perspectives in the future.
11	11	"Winter Wrap Up"	Cindy Morrow	December 24, 2010	111
Twilight is eager to participate in Ponyville's "Winter Wrap-Up," where the townsfolk help prepare the land for spring without using magic. Twilight tries to help out where she can, but finds herself struggling without her magic. As she frets about her inability to help, she overhears the team leaders arguing over the coordination of their activities and worrying that they will not complete the Wrap-Up in time. Twilight steps in, offering her skills in organization to get the Wrap-Up back on track. The Wrap-Up is successfully completed on time, and the town gives Twilight the job of official Wrap-Up coordinator.
12	12	"Call of the Cutie"	Meghan McCarthy	January 7, 2011	112
Apple Bloom becomes worried when two stuck-up classmates, Diamond Tiara and Silver Spoon, get their cutie marks and taunt Apple Bloom as a "blank flank" for lacking hers. Apple Bloom starts striving to find her own talent and get her own cutie mark, asking advice from her sister Applejack and her friends. Despite her efforts, she remains without her cutie mark. She finds herself caught within Diamond Tiara and Silver Spoon's Cute-ceañera celebration, and tries to leave before she is ridiculed. Just as she is discovered and teased by her classmates, two other fillies who lack cutie marks, Sweetie Belle and Scootaloo, stand up for Apple Bloom, assuring that she still has much potential in her life. The rest of the partygoers soon take more interest in Apple Bloom and her new friends than Diamond Tiara and Silver Spoon. After the party, Apple Bloom, Sweetie Belle, and Scootaloo form the "Cutie Mark Crusaders" to earn their cutie marks together.
13	13	"Fall Weather Friends"	Amy Keating Rogers	January 28, 2011	113
After a friendly game of horseshoes, Applejack and Rainbow Dash start boasting to each other about their athletic prowess. They begin an informal series of "Iron Pony" challenges to determine who is better, but Rainbow Dash, enabled by her wings, soon takes the edge. Applejack insists on one last event to decide the winner, the "Running of the Leaves" marathon, with the condition that Rainbow Dash keep her wings tied down. At the marathon, Twilight decides to participate despite her lack of athleticism. As the race starts, Applejack and Rainbow Dash take an early lead, and try to trick each other to keep their lead. As they near the end, they start to get more physical, and end up fighting across the finish line. To their surprise, they come in last while Twilight beats them in fifth place using her slow-and-steady pace. Applejack and Rainbow Dash realize their feuding is futile, so they accept their defeat and agree to keep to more friendly competitions.
14	14	"Suited for Success"	Charlotte Fullerton	February 4, 2011	114
When Twilight brings an old dress to Rarity to repair for the upcoming Grand Galloping Gala, Rarity insists on making her and her friends new dresses. Rarity's designs for her dresses do not go well with her friends, so she agrees to remake the dresses with their input. She soon finds her friends' demands excessive and outlandish, but she does not question them. She is later shocked to learn Spike has arranged for the famous fashion designer Hoity Toity to come see the new dresses. As the show proceeds, Hoity Toity and the audience are disgusted by Rarity's over-the-top dresses, and Rarity believes her career is ruined. Feeling guilty, Rarity's friends complete her own Gala dress following her designs as an apology, and convince Hoity Toity to attend a second show using the original dresses, impressing him.
15	15	"Feeling Pinkie Keen"	Dave Polsky	February 11, 2011	115
Twilight learns the rest of Ponyville believes that Pinkie Pie has a "Pinkie Sense," in which her body reacts in different ways as warnings to certain events. Twilight insists this is impossible and attempts to understand how the Pinkie Sense works, though she ends up in a number of pratfalls from this. When Pinkie asserts that there is a "doozy" of an event in the nearby bog where Fluttershy is, she, Twilight, Spike, and Applejack take off to save her. They find Fluttershy safe, but are soon chased by a hydra. They all escape safely, but Pinkie asserts that her sense is still going off and the "doozy" has yet to happen. Exhausted, Twilight finally gives up trying to understand the Pinkie Sense. Pinkie's sense disappears, and she asserts that Twilight's revelation was the "doozy." Twilight accepts that the Pinkie Sense is real, and that she should stop worrying about its origins.
16	16	"Sonic Rainboom"	M.A. Larson	February 18, 2011	116
Rainbow Dash is set to perform in the Young Flyers Competition in Cloudsdale, planning to perform a "Sonic Rainboom" to win it. Fluttershy confides with her friends that Rainbow Dash has only been able to pull off the Sonic Rainboom once before, and that she is nervous about her performance. Determined to attend the competition and support Rainbow Dash, Rarity receives wings through a difficult spell courtesy of Twilight, while an easier spell allows the others to walk on clouds. In Cloudsdale, Rarity finds entering the competition herself. At the competition, Rainbow Dash blunders the early stages before preparing for the Sonic Rainboom, while Rarity stuns the audience by flying high into the sky and showing off her wings. However, Rarity's wings disintegrate in the sunlight, causing her to plummet to the ground. Rainbow Dash sees Rarity in trouble and dives to the ground, pulling off the Sonic Rainboom and saving Rarity and the Wonderbolts in time. Rainbow Dash safely returns them all to Cloudsdale, where she is cheered on and named by Princess Celestia as the champion of the competition.
17	17	"Stare Master"	Chris Savino	February 25, 2011	117
With Rarity engrossed in work, Fluttershy offers to watch over the Cutie Mark Crusaders for the night, however she finds them to be rambunctious and hard to control. At night, the Crusaders find that one of Fluttershy's chickens has escaped into the Everfree Forest, and they go out to retrieve it. Fluttershy soon discovers they are missing and follows their hoofprints. She eventually comes across Twilight and her chicken frozen into stone, and realizes a cockatrice is nearby. She finds the Crusaders and warns them of the danger, but they soon come face-to-face with the cockatrice. As the cockatrice starts to turn Fluttershy into stone, she gives it an intense stare and demands it reverse its spell. The cockatrice eventually relents, reversing its petrification of her, Twilight, and the chicken, and disappears. The Crusaders cheer for Fluttershy and call her the "Stare Master." The next morning, Rarity comes to retrieve the Crusaders, and is surprised that they quickly fall in line with a simple request from Fluttershy.
18	18	"The Show Stoppers"	Cindy Morrow	March 4, 2011	118
Applejack donates her old clubhouse to the Cutie Mark Crusaders. From there, the Crusaders try finding ways to get their cutie marks, but each time ends in comical failure. Twilight and Cheerilee suggest they enter the school's talent competition. The Crusaders agree to perform a musical number, but each of them want to do something in which they are unskilled: Apple Bloom wants to dance, Sweetie Belle wants to make the props and costumes, and Scootaloo wants to write and sing. At the show, they blunder disastrously through the song, confusing the crowd. To their surprise, they win the prize for best comedy act. Despite this, they still do not earn their cutie marks.
19	19	"A Dog and Pony Show"	Amy Keating Rogers	March 11, 2011	119
Rarity enlists Spike to help recover gems for a large order of dresses. As they work, Rarity is abducted by Diamond Dogs, who want her to dowse for gems in their caves. Spike races back to get the others to help rescue Rarity. Meanwhile, Rarity is able to use her wiles to trick the Dogs into treating her in a royal manner. By the time Spike and the others find Rarity, the Dogs are willing to let her leave with large quantities of gems, so they would not have to suffer under her anymore. The others help pull the gems back to Ponyville, while Rarity comments that one does not always need strength to win over one's enemies.
20	20	"Green Isn't Your Color"	Meghan McCarthy	March 18, 2011	120
The famous fashion photographer Photo Finish comes to Ponyville to see Rarity's dresses she has made for the Gala. Rarity begs Fluttershy to help model the fashions. Despite her dislike of attention, Fluttershy agrees. Photo Finish is more taken by Fluttershy's shyness than Rarity's dresses, and declares Fluttershy to be an ideal model, leading her to stardom. Twilight becomes aware of Fluttershy's fear of disappointing Rarity and Rarity's jealousy of Fluttershy's success, but Pinkie warns her that telling these secrets to others can ruin her friendships, and Twilight frets over how to correct the situation. Eventually, Fluttershy and Rarity admit their secrets to each other, relieved that they agree, and Fluttershy gives up her modeling career.
21	21	"Over a Barrel"	Dave Polsky	March 25, 2011	121
Applejack and her friends deliver an apple tree to the foundling frontier town of Appleloosa. They found out that the ponies of the town are in conflict with a nearby buffalo tribe, who have previously used the land as a running ground until the town planted an apple grove. Twilight and her friends work to establish peace between the two sides, but Pinkie Pie's song, performed at an inappropriate time, leads the two sides to declare war on each other. The buffalo charge at the town, who fire on the buffalo with apple pies. When the buffalo chieftain is hit with a pie, he discovers it is tasty and quickly puts an end to the battle. The two groups agree to a peaceful solution: the ponies leave a trail for the buffalo to run through the apple grove, while the buffalo get to enjoy apple pies made from the fruits.
22	22	"A Bird in the Hoof"	Charlotte Fullerton	April 8, 2011	122
Princess Celestia visits Ponyville along with her seemingly sick pet bird, Philomena. Fluttershy, worried about the bird's health, secretly takes Philomena to her cottage and tries to help her, but everything she does seems to worsen the bird's condition. When Twilight discovers this, she gets involved in helping cure Philomena, and learns that Celestia's guards are looking for it. Eventually Philomena escapes, leading Twilight and Fluttershy on a chase through town. The chase ends when Philomena falls from the top of a statue, bursting into flames and falling as a pile of ash into Fluttershy's hooves just as Celestia arrives. Fluttershy profusely apologizes, ready to take any punishment, before Celestia reveals that Philomena is a phoenix. Philomena rises from the ashes as a powerful bird, and at Celestia's insistence, apologizes to Fluttershy for messing with her.
23	23	"The Cutie Mark Chronicles"	M.A. Larson	April 15, 2011	123
The Cutie Mark Crusaders, believing they can determine how to get their cutie marks by learning how the older ponies in town got theirs, seek out and learn how Applejack, Fluttershy, Rarity, Twilight, Pinkie Pie, and Rainbow Dash earned their cutie marks. The six friends realize that Rainbow Dash's first Sonic Rainboom triggered the events by which each of them earned their cutie marks, and that they are closer than they originally thought.
24	24	"Owl's Well That Ends Well"	Cindy Morrow	April 22, 2011	124
Twilight realizes that Spike, being a baby dragon, is unable to stay awake to help her with her astronomy studies, but gets help with a new pet owl, Owlowiscious. Spike becomes jealous of Owlowiscious, thinking the owl wants to replace him as Twilight's assistant. Later, Twilight finds a book damaged by Spike's fire breath and scolds him for hiding it from her, and later still expresses disappointment when he tries to frame Owlowiscious for killing a toy mouse. Convinced that Twilight no longer wants him, Spike runs away from home into the Everfree Forest and finds a cave full of gems. He realizes that the cave belongs to an adult dragon, but Twilight and Owlowiscious soon arrive and save him. Twilight admits to Spike that she only needs Owlowiscious for additional help at night, and they reconcile while Spike makes friends with Owlowiscious.
25	25	"Party of One"	Meghan McCarthy	April 29, 2011	125
After inviting her friends to and throwing a birthday party for her pet alligator Gummy, Pinkie Pie decides to throw a day-after party to continue the celebrations, but she finds that her friends all seem to be busy. Suspicious of their behavior, Pinkie follows her friends and discovers they are actively avoiding and hiding something from her in Applejack's barn. Pinkie becomes depressed, thinking they do not want to be her friends anymore. She throws her own party using inanimate objects when Rainbow Dash retrieves her and brings her to a party at the barn. Pinkie thinks her friends are throwing a party to get rid of her, only to realize it is actually her own birthday party, which she had forgotten. Pinkie quickly becomes happy and joins the celebration with her friends.
26	26	"The Best Night Ever"	Amy Keating Rogers	May 6, 2011	126
As the night of the Grand Galloping Gala in Canterlot has finally arrived, Twilight and her friends quickly separate to enjoy the Gala in their own ways, but each of them soon finds their experience falling well short of their expectations. As events mount, the group's actions lead to a mass of chaos in the grand ballroom. They regroup later at a donut shop and express their disappointment with the night's events, but are soon joined by Princess Celestia, who explains that she had invited Twilight and her friends to liven up the normally boring Gala, and is happy with the results. Everyone agrees the night to be the "best night ever."

== DVD release ==
My Little Pony Friendship Is Magic: Season One
Set details	Special features
26 episodes; 4-disc set; 1.78:1 aspect ratio; Subtitles: English; English (5.1 Surround; 2.0 stereo for commentaries)	Sing-Along song videos (Extended theme song and "At the Gala"); Printable coloring sheets; Audio commentaries with cast and crew ("Friendship Is Magic", "Winter Wrap-Up", "Suited for Success", "The Show Stoppers", "The Best Night Ever")
Release dates
Region 1	Region 2
December 4, 2012	November 3, 2014
