= Call of the Cutie =

- My Little Pony: Friendship Is Magic episode
- Apple Bloom's blank flank is revealed at Diamond Tiara's cute-ceañera.
- Episode no.: Season 1 Episode 12
- Directed by: Jayson Thiessen; James Wootton
- Written by: Meghan McCarthy
- Original air date: January 7, 2011
- Running time: 22 minutes

Episode chronology
← Previous "Winter Wrap Up"	Next → "Fall Weather Friends"
- My Little Pony: Friendship Is Magic season 1

"Call of the Cutie" is the twelfth episode of the first season of the animated television series My Little Pony: Friendship Is Magic. It originally aired on The Hub on January 7, 2011. The episode was written by Meghan McCarthy. In this episode, Apple Bloom becomes worried about not having her cutie mark and attempts to gain one by any means necessary before Diamond Tiara's cute-ceañera.

== Plot ==
External videos
- Call of the Cutie (full episode) — Official upload of the episode onto YouTube

In the Ponyville Schoolhouse, Cheerilee teaches young ponies about cutie marks, and Diamond Tiara uses the lesson as an opportunity to embarrass Apple Bloom for not yet having one. After class, Diamond Tiara invites Apple Bloom and Twist to her cute-ceañera while she and Silver Spoon tease them for being "blank flanks." At Sweet Apple Acres, Applejack reassures Apple Bloom that every pony gets a cutie mark eventually and points out that their family tends to be late bloomers, which leads Apple Bloom to conclude her talent must be related to apples. However, when her overzealous sales tactics at the market cause more harm than good, she becomes even more frustrated and discovers that Twist has just received her cutie mark for making sweets.

Determined to get her cutie mark before the party, Apple Bloom seeks help from various ponies around town. Rainbow Dash coaches her in numerous activities including juggling, hang-gliding, karate, and roller derby, but none succeed in getting her a cutie mark. At Sugarcube Corner, Pinkie Pie suggests Apple Bloom might be good at making cupcakes, but despite an upbeat song ("Cupcake Song") and multiple attempts, each batch ends up burned and Apple Bloom grows increasingly discouraged. Apple Bloom desperately begs Twilight Sparkle to use magic to make a cutie mark appear, but the conjured magical marks quickly disappear and Twilight explains that not even magic can force a cutie mark to manifest.

Apple Bloom decides not to attend the party due to her continued blank flank, only to discover that Diamond Tiara's cute-ceañera is taking place at Sugarcube Corner where she already stands. She tries to leave unnoticed but bumps into Applejack, who pushes her in front of Diamond Tiara and Silver Spoon, forcing Apple Bloom to cover herself with a tablecloth and claim she got her cutie mark but doesn't want to outshine the birthday pony. When she stumbles and exposes her blank flank to all the party guests, Diamond Tiara and Silver Spoon mock her publicly.

Scootaloo and Sweetie Belle emerge from under a table to defend Apple Bloom and reveal their own blank flanks, arguing that having no cutie mark shows potential rather than lack of talent since it means she could become anything from a great scientist to the mayor of Ponyville someday. The three fillies receive supportive comments from Twilight and Applejack and become surrounded by excited party attendees, which aggravates Diamond Tiara enough to make her storm off. The three cutie mark-less fillies introduce themselves and form a club dedicated to earning their cutie marks, eventually settling on the name "Cutie Mark Crusaders".

== Reception ==
Sherilyn Connelly, the author of Ponyville Confidential, gave the episode a "B" rating. In her review of the episode in SF Weekly, she commented on the trio's mission to gain their cutie mark: "As crusades go, it's healthier than most."

In a critical analysis of the episode, author Jen A. Blue described "Call of the Cutie" as "very nearly as good" as writer Meghan McCarthy's first episode ("Dragonshy"), while identifying the introduction of the Cutie Mark Crusaders as representing both the show's target audience of young girls and the adult brony fanbase seeking to establish their identities. Blue wrote that the Crusaders function as "the audience" because they are "geeks among geeks" who are "picked on and disliked by their peers". She analyzed Apple Bloom's character as existing "in a tension between old and new, between the desire to grow up and establish her identity, and the desire to stay a child and retreat to the comfort of family," with this conflict externalized through her advisors Applejack and Rainbow Dash. According to Blue, Applejack represents the comfort of taking time to discover one's cutie mark naturally, while Rainbow Dash pushes Apple Bloom to try new things quickly, and that Twilight Sparkle's suggestion for the Crusaders to "revel in their potential" rather than obsess over their path is "a reminder that we hold our destinies in our own hands," which she called a vital lesson of the episode. Blue connected the episode to the show's future direction; the conflict between Applejack and Rainbow Dash represents the show's own search for its identity between traditional My Little Pony values and contemporary animated programming.

Tara Rittler of TulsaKids praised the episode's moral lessons, describing them as relatable to both children and adults. She wrote that "Call of the Cutie" offers valuable guidance about being patient when uncertain about one's life direction and not stressing when you don't know what you're supposed to do with your life—a feeling she described as being "all too familiar with."

Feminist author Melanie Hurley analyzed the role of cutie marks in "Call of the Cutie" as symbols for female body positivity and bodily development (puberty). Hurley wrote that the episode creates "a positive narrative around puberty, shifting the conversation around the female body from one of menstrual shame to one of the acceptance of nature." She wrote that the acquisition of cutie marks is a metaphor for menarche: ponies treat receiving their cutie mark as a major life milestone, the characters discussing cutie marks in the episode are predominantly female, and Diamond Tiara's cute-ceañera explicitly frames cutie mark acquisition as a rite of passage. Hurley commented that this coding allows the show to present bodily changes as something to look forward to instead of something to be ashamed of.

== Home media ==
The episode is part of the Season 1 DVD set, released by Shout Factory, on December 4, 2012.

== See also ==
- List of My Little Pony: Friendship Is Magic episodes
