= The Ticket Master =

- My Little Pony: Friendship Is Magic episode
- Twilight Sparkle is overjoyed to see that Princess Celestia has sent her two tickets to the Grand Galloping Gala.
- Episode no.: Season 1 Episode 3
- Directed by: Jayson Thiessen; James Wootton
- Written by: Amy Keating Rogers & Lauren Faust
- Original air date: October 29, 2010
- Running time: 22 minutes

Episode chronology
← Previous "Friendship Is Magic – Part 2"	Next → "Applebuck Season"
- My Little Pony: Friendship Is Magic season 1

"The Ticket Master" is the third episode of the first season of the animated television series My Little Pony: Friendship Is Magic. It originally aired on The Hub on October 29, 2010. The episode was written by Amy Keating Rogers and Lauren Faust and directed by James Wootton. In this episode, Twilight Sparkle receives two tickets to the Grand Galloping Gala from Princess Celestia, leading to conflict among her friends as each wants to be chosen as her companion.

== Plot ==
External videos
- The Ticket Master (full episode) — Official upload of the episode onto YouTube

Princess Celestia sends Twilight Sparkle two tickets for the upcoming exclusive Grand Galloping Gala. However, upon learning of the tickets, each of Twilight's friends - Rainbow Dash, Rarity, Pinkie Pie, Fluttershy, and Applejack - insists she should be the one to go with her, and they start competing for Twilight's attention, offering various favors and gifts in hopes of being selected.

Twilight finds herself overwhelmed by the pressure and attention from her friends, realizing that choosing one friend over the others would damage her relationships with the rest. Unable to bear the thought of hurting any of her friends' feelings and seeing how their competition is affecting their friendships with each other, Twilight makes the difficult decision to politely return both tickets to Princess Celestia, despite her friends' apologies for their selfishness once they realize what their behavior has done.

To everyone's surprise, Princess Celestia replies by sending back enough tickets for Twilight and all of her friends, allowing them all to attend the Grand Galloping Gala together.

Dear Princess Celestia,

I've learned that one of the joys of friendship is sharing your blessings. But when there's not enough blessings to go around, having more than your friends can make you feel pretty awful.

— Twilight Sparkle, "The Ticket Master"

== Reception ==
In a critical analysis of the episode, author Jen A. Blue described "The Ticket Master" as "problematic but overall solid," identifying several issues with its portrayal of gender and friendship dynamics. Blue criticized the episode for reinforcing gender essentialism: she argued that Spike's rejection of the gala as "girly, frilly, frou-frou nonsense" meant only for girls sent problematic messages to young viewers about gender-appropriate activities. Blue also noted that Rarity's characterization suffered in this episode, falling into stereotypes of shallow, manipulative social climbing focused primarily on finding a husband, and criticized the episode's cynical premise where newly bonded friends would attempt to bribe each other for personal gain, describing this as depicting frenemy behavior typically associated with toxic portrayals of femininity in media. However, Blue concluded that the episode ultimately redeems itself through its resolution, where the characters apologize and learn to behave better, demonstrating that "cynicism and bigotry wither in the face of friendship and sincerity" and maintaining the show's core values despite its flaws.

Sherilyn Connelly, the author of Ponyville Confidential, gave the episode an "A" rating, and wrote that it is one of the best episodes of Season 1. On the other hand, Susana Polo of The Mary Sue wrote that the conflict in "The Ticket Master" was standard fare in girls' shows that she hated to see and had been done to death, representing the kind of junior-high drama that she had otherwise complimented as being avoided in the show.

Jamie Kingston of WomenWriteAboutComics praised how the episode dealt with the theme of peer pressure.

== Home media ==
The episode is part of the Season 1 DVD set, released by Shout Factory, on December 4, 2012.

== See also ==
- List of My Little Pony: Friendship Is Magic episodes
