= Owl's Well That Ends Well =

- My Little Pony: Friendship Is Magic episode
- Spike (right) argues with Owlowiscious (left) about who is the superior assistant to Twilight Sparkle.
- Episode no.: Season 1 Episode 24
- Directed by: Jayson Thiessen; James Wootton
- Written by: Cindy Morrow
- Original air date: April 22, 2011
- Running time: 22 minutes

Episode chronology
← Previous "The Cutie Mark Chronicles"	Next → "Party of One"
- My Little Pony: Friendship Is Magic season 1

"Owl's Well That Ends Well" is the twenty-fourth episode of the first season of the animated television series My Little Pony: Friendship Is Magic. It originally aired on The Hub on April 22, 2011. The episode was written by Cindy Morrow. In this episode, Spike becomes jealous when Twilight Sparkle gets a pet owl to help with her nighttime studies, leading him to believe he is being replaced as her assistant.

== Plot ==
External videos
- Owl's Well That Ends Well (full episode) — Official upload of the episode onto YouTube

One evening at the Golden Oak Library, Twilight Sparkle and Spike prepare for a picnic to watch the centennial meteor shower. Twilight asks Spike to fetch an astronomy book from another room, but when Spike picks up the dusty book, the cover causes him to sneeze fire that consumes the pages. Too afraid to reveal what happened, he simply replaces the damaged book on the shelf. They head to the picnic area where they join the rest of the Mane Six to enjoy the meteor shower. Rarity gives Spike a jeweled bow tie for preparing the refreshments. After Spike falls asleep in the punch bowl, Twilight tucks him into bed back at the library and begins writing about comets on a scroll before getting distracted by creaking noises outside.

Twilight opens windows to investigate the noise, but a gust of wind carries her parchment off into the night. Fortunately, an owl enters through the window with her scroll and drops it on the table. Twilight thanks the owl and invites him to stay inside and keep her company while she works through the night. The next morning, Spike discovers that his chores have been completed by Twilight's new "junior assistant" Owlowiscious, and despite Twilight's suggestion that he befriend the owl, Spike becomes convinced that Owlowiscious wants to replace him.

Spike's jealousy intensifies when he watches the Mane Six admire Owlowiscious outside and sees Rarity gift the owl a bejeweled bow tie identical to his own. He tries to step up his assistance to Twilight, but his attempts to prove himself superior repeatedly fail as Owlowiscious out-does him at every turn. Twilight confronts Spike about the charred astronomy book that Owlowiscious discovered, and Spike accuses the owl of setting him up. He devises a plan to frame Owlowiscious by stealing Opalescence's (Rarity's pet cat) toy mouse, tearing it open, and covering it with ketchup and pillow feathers to make it look like Owlowiscious killed a real mouse.

Twilight catches Spike in the act and expresses her disappointment. Spike misinterprets this as hatred and runs away to the Everfree Forest. He takes shelter in a cave where he discovers and eats a trove of gemstones, but an enormous green dragon enters and demands to know why his gems have been consumed. Just when Spike becomes cornered by the angry dragon, Owlowiscious flies in and creates a distraction that allows Spike to escape, and together with Twilight they flee the forest. Twilight reassures Spike that he is still her number one assistant and friend and explains that Owlowiscious was only there to help at night rather than replace him, and Spike apologizes for his jealous behavior.

== Reception and analysis ==
Sherilyn Connelly, the author of Ponyville Confidential, gave the episode a "C" rating and called it "adequate" in comparison to "The Best Night Ever", "Party of One", and "The Cutie Mark Chronicles", which she deemed were "A+". She wrote that "Owl's Well That Ends Well" would have felt more organic earlier in the season. In her review of the episode in SF Weekly, she wrote, "It's not bad, by any means, but it feels like a kind of storytelling that MLP:FIM had evolved past by this point" and remarked that "Party of One" explored similar themes in a more emotional and darker way.

In a critical analysis of the episode, author Jen A. Blue described "Owl's Well That Ends Well" as "predictably mediocre", writing that while the episode contained "some good laughs" and introduced "a creepily adorable new pet for Twilight Sparkle," it was problematic for being "heavily focused on Spike, who is on his absolute worst behavior." Similar to her analysis of "A Dog and Pony Show", Blue analyzed Spike's jealousy toward Owlowiscious as an example of what she termed a "transactional model of relationships," where Spike behaves in a subservient manner in order to gain affection and companionship in return. She argued that this attitude stems from "a combination of insecurity and entitlement" and described Spike's behavior as "Nice Guy Syndrome"; she also compared this to sibling rivalry that would be familiar to the show's target audience. Blue wrote that Spike's fear of losing Twilight's attention and his sense of entitlement to her care is reminiscent of how children naturally depend on adults for survival needs, making his jealousy understandable despite his problematic behavior.

== Home media ==
The episode is part of the Season 1 DVD set, released by Shout Factory, on December 4, 2012.

== See also ==
- List of My Little Pony: Friendship Is Magic episodes
