= Dragonshy =

- My Little Pony: Friendship Is Magic episode
- Fluttershy notices an ominous cloud of black smoke heading towards Ponyville.
- Episode no.: Season 1 Episode 7
- Directed by: Jayson Thiessen; James Wootton
- Written by: Meghan McCarthy
- Original air date: November 26, 2010
- Running time: 22 minutes

Episode chronology
← Previous "Boast Busters"	Next → "Look Before You Sleep"
- My Little Pony: Friendship Is Magic season 1

"Dragonshy" is the seventh episode of the first season of the animated television series My Little Pony: Friendship Is Magic. It originally aired on The Hub on November 26, 2010. The episode was written by Meghan McCarthy. In this episode, Fluttershy must overcome her crippling fear of dragons when she and her friends are tasked with convincing a dragon to leave his cave, as his smoky breath threatens to cover Ponyville.

== Plot ==
External videos
- Dragonshy (full episode) — Official upload of the episode onto YouTube

While Fluttershy feeds animals around her cottage, her pet bunny Angel alerts her to an ominous cloud of black smoke approaching Ponyville. Twilight Sparkle announces that the smoke is coming from a dragon rather than a fire. Princess Celestia tasks the Mane Six with convincing the dragon to relocate from a nearby mountain, explaining that his snoring produces the smoke and threatens to cover Equestria in darkness for a hundred years if he continues sleeping there. Fluttershy becomes visibly distressed and tries to excuse herself from the journey, to no avail.

The group ascends up the treacherous mountain, but Fluttershy struggles at every obstacle due to her overwhelming fear. Applejack guides her up an alternate path when she balks at the steep slope, and Pinkie Pie sings an encouraging song to help her cross a narrow chasm. Fluttershy accidentally triggers an avalanche when she becomes startled by a falling leaf and shouts in the avalanche zone. The group eventually reaches the dragon's cave, but Fluttershy refuses to enter and reveals that she is afraid of fully-grown dragons.

The other ponies attempt various strategies to convince the dragon to leave without Fluttershy's help: Twilight appeals to reason, Rarity tries flattery, and Pinkie Pie attempts to entertain the creature with silly costumes. Rainbow Dash becomes frustrated and kicks the dragon between the nostrils, which enrages him and causes him to attack the group. His powerful breath knocks the ponies into a rock, which crumbles to reveal Fluttershy hiding behind it.

Fluttershy overcomes her fear and flies directly up to the dragon's face to scold him for his aggressive behavior. She acknowledges that Rainbow Dash shouldn't have kicked him, but argues that he should have known better than to retaliate so violently since he is much larger. Fluttershy then admonishes him for sleeping in a location where his snoring endangers other creatures and demands an apology, which causes the dragon to burst into tears. After she calms and reassures him, the dragon departs peacefully, and the group returns to Ponyville.

== Reception ==
What defines many of Fluttershy's story lines and the content of her character is the contrast between her normal personality and the alter ego that emerges when a friend or animal is being harmed in some way. In the Season 1 episode "Dragonshy," Fluttershy reluctantly joins her friends to confront a smoke-billowing dragon whose heavy breath is polluting Ponyville's skies. Afraid of heights and dragons, Fluttershy has to muster the courage to confront the giant beast at the top of a mountain.

— Mary Jane Begin, My Little Pony: The Art of Equestria

Panels from the storyboard of "Dragonshy"

Sherilyn Connelly, the author of Ponyville Confidential, gave the episode a "B+" rating. She criticized the episode's conclusion and used it as an example of "whiffed endings" in the series. In her review of the episode in SF Weekly, she lamented that this episode was the first to feature an Everybody Laughs Ending, a television and film trope where episodes conclude with all the main characters laughing together.

In a critical analysis of the episode, author Jen A. Blue praised "Dragonshy" as "the best episode we've looked at yet" and lauded Meghan McCarthy's skill as a writer. Blue analyzed the dragon as an effective villain that invokes classical mythology, particularly pointing out how the episode establishes the threat through both Fluttershy's immediate panic and Celestia's letter, which strategically creates a genuine menace while keeping the dragon largely off-screen. Blue wrote that the episode functions as a character study disguised as an adventure story: the dragon is a metaphor for Fluttershy's internal fears of social confrontation and disapproval of others. She analyzed the climax as a dominance display between animals, where Fluttershy's hypersensitivity to others' attitudes—typically her weakness—becomes her strength in understanding and responding to the dragon's behavior. Blue compared this scene to the use of monsters in Buffy the Vampire Slayer as metaphors for character issues, deducing that "by defeating the dragon, Fluttershy overcomes those parts of herself that are holding her back".

Alesha Davis, in a retrospective review for The Post, analyzed the episode within the context of what she termed "fantasy racism" in the series. According to Davis, while "Dragonshy" contained "no serious offenses," it marked the beginning of problematic patterns in how the ponies treat other species, writing that this was "the first time the ponies speak about dragons beyond a brief, passing mention." She criticized the inconsistency in how Twilight Sparkle refers to the dragon as a "wild animal" despite being aware that Spike is also a dragon but not treating him as such, describing this as the ponies "displaying general ignorance about other creatures." Nevertheless, Davis acknowledged that dragons should be frightening in fantasy contexts and that the ponies had legitimate reasons for their fear and also remarked that series creator Lauren Faust may not have yet developed the complex dragon society depicted in later seasons.

== Home media ==
The episode is part of the Season 1 DVD set, released by Shout Factory, on December 4, 2012.

== See also ==
- List of My Little Pony: Friendship Is Magic episodes
