= Fall Weather Friends =

- My Little Pony: Friendship Is Magic episode
- Twilight (left) joins the Running of the Leaves, much to Applejack's (right) and Rainbow Dash's (center) amusement.
- Episode no.: Season 1 Episode 13
- Directed by: Jayson Thiessen; James Wootton
- Written by: Amy Keating Rogers
- Original air date: January 28, 2011
- Running time: 22 minutes

Episode chronology
← Previous "Call of the Cutie"	Next → "Suited for Success"
- My Little Pony: Friendship Is Magic season 1

"Fall Weather Friends" is the thirteenth episode of the first season of the animated television series My Little Pony: Friendship Is Magic. It originally aired on The Hub on January 28, 2011. The episode was written by Amy Keating Rogers. In this episode, Applejack and Rainbow Dash engage in a series of athletic competitions that escalates into a heated rivalry during Ponyville's annual Running of the Leaves marathon.

== Plot ==
External videos
- Fall Weather Friends (full episode) — Official upload of the episode onto YouTube

Applejack and Rainbow Dash play a game of horseshoes at Sweet Apple Acres, and when Applejack wins, Rainbow challenges her to an Iron Pony competition to determine who is the better athlete. Twilight Sparkle agrees to judge as the two friends engage in a series of athletic contests, trading wins for the first eight events until Rainbow starts using her wings to gain an unfair advantage. Rainbow wins the remaining events and the overall competition through her flying ability, to which Applejack calls out the cheating and challenges her to race in the Running of the Leaves—an annual community marathon where ponies run through the forest to shake autumn leaves from the trees. Rainbow agrees and promises not to use her wings during the race.

As the racers gather at the starting line, Applejack ensures Rainbow keeps her promise by tying her wings up, while Twilight joins them to experience the event herself. The marathon begins with Rainbow and Applejack taking the lead and running neck and neck, but when each competitor stumbles over natural obstacles, they begin suspecting the other of deliberate sabotage. As the two run through White Tail Woods, both ponies start actively trying to hinder each other.

In the home stretch, Applejack and Rainbow escalate their antagonistic behavior by deliberately bumping into each other throughout the final portion of the race. When Rainbow's wings become untied during their tussling, Applejack tackles her to prevent her from flying and the two continue fighting all the way past the finish line while arguing over who finished first. Pinkie Pie informs them that they tied for last place, and Twilight approaches wearing a fifth place medal, having outperformed both of them despite her inexperience. Princess Celestia arrives to celebrate the event, and Applejack and Rainbow apologize for their poor sportsmanship. Twilight reflects that friendship in competition is always more important than the competition itself, and the two friends immediately run off to race each other once more.

== Reception ==
Sherilyn Connelly, the author of Ponyville Confidential, gave the episode a "C+" rating. In her review of the episode in SF Weekly, she wrote, "Remember how Applejack and Rainbow Dash are supposed to respectively represent the elements of Honesty and Loyalty? That doesn't make for nearly as interesting characters as the elements of competition and distrust. In the end, Twilight beats them both, though the episode avoids getting too Aesopian by having her happily win fifth place."

In a critical analysis of the episode, author Jen A. Blue described "Fall Weather Friends" as "one of Rogers' better episodes this season—nothing particularly special, but watchable at least." Blue identified the main flaw as the way it depicts the conflict between Applejack and Rainbow Dash, writing that Applejack is portrayed as "calmer and a better sport" who accepts challenges fairly, while Rainbow Dash "uses every unfair move she can think of" within the rules and "rejecting its spirit." Blue wrote that Applejack only cheats when she believes Rainbow Dash is doing so, which she believed was "forgivable". Blue analyzed the episode within an alchemical framework, connecting the changing of the leaves to the "yellowing" phase of transformation and interpreting the characters' conflict as representing different approaches to the show itself: Applejack as "business as usual, a slow-paced, gentle, rather boring show" and Rainbow Dash as "fast, cool, fun, and utterly devoid of scruples or heart."

== Home media ==
The episode is part of the Season 1 DVD set, released by Shout Factory, on December 4, 2012.

== See also ==
- List of My Little Pony: Friendship Is Magic episodes
