= Swarm of the Century =

- My Little Pony: Friendship Is Magic episode
- Fluttershy, Twilight, Rarity, and Rainbow Dash (left to right) are worried about the parasprite invasion that they inadvertently caused.
- Episode no.: Season 1 Episode 10
- Directed by: Jayson Thiessen; James Wootton
- Written by: M.A. Larson
- Original air date: December 17, 2010
- Running time: 22 minutes

Episode chronology
← Previous "Bridle Gossip"	Next → "Winter Wrap Up"
- My Little Pony: Friendship Is Magic season 1

"Swarm of the Century" is the tenth episode of the first season of the animated television series My Little Pony: Friendship Is Magic. It originally aired on The Hub on December 17, 2010. The episode was written by M.A. Larson. In this episode, Fluttershy discovers a cute creature called a parasprite, but the town of Ponyville is soon overrun when the creatures reproduce rapidly and begin devouring everything in sight.

== Plot ==
External videos
- Swarm of the Century (full episode) — Official upload of the episode onto YouTube

Fluttershy discovers a small and adorable creature called a parasprite in the Everfree Forest and decides to bring it home as a pet. At first, the tiny creature appears harmless and cute and captivates anyone who sees it, but soon begins reproducing at an alarming rate and creates dozens of identical copies of itself. The parasprite quickly becomes a growing swarm of creatures that fills Fluttershy's cottage.

The parasprites begin to devour everything edible in sight and move through Ponyville like a plague of locusts. The swarm grows exponentially as they consume food and multiply further and threatens to destroy the entire town's food supply. To make matters worse, Princess Celestia is scheduled to visit Ponyville soon, and the ponies desperately need to resolve the crisis before her arrival. Twilight Sparkle and her friends attempt various magical and practical solutions to stop the invasion, but their efforts only seem to make the problem worse.

Throughout the chaos, Pinkie Pie repeatedly tries to offer help and share her knowledge about dealing with parasprites, but her friends dismiss her seemingly nonsensical suggestions and erratic behavior. As the parasprite swarm threatens to consume everything in Ponyville, the situation becomes increasingly desperate. Eventually, Pinkie Pie uses a combination of musical instruments to lead the entire swarm of parasprites out of Ponyville (in a manner reminiscent of the Pied Piper). The crisis is resolved just in time, though Princess Celestia, after quickly understanding the situation, ends up postponing her visit due to - as she claims - a similar parasprite infestation in Fillydelphia.

== Reception ==
Sherilyn Connelly, the author of Ponyville Confidential, gave the episode a "B+" rating. In her review of the episode in SF Weekly, Connelly identified moral ambiguity in the episode's conclusion, suggesting that either Princess Celestia was allowing Twilight to save face by claiming the visit was postponed due to a Fillydelphia infestation, or that an actual parasprite invasion had occurred there and Twilight was too embarrassed to offer help. Connelly observed that regardless of interpretation, one character was being dishonest with the other.

Jamie Weinman compared "Swarm of the Century" to the Star Trek episode "The Trouble with Tribbles," but writer M.A. Larson later revealed that Gremlins provided stronger inspiration and that he had never seen "Tribbles". Show creator Lauren Faust noted on her DeviantArt page that the Star Trek parallels only occurred to the team after they began developing their locust-plague story.

In a critical analysis of the episode, author Jen A. Blue described "Swarm of the Century" as "pretty good" and the first episode written by M.A. Larson, whom she called one of the show's better writers who tends to create "geek-friendly" episodes focused on pop-culture references and expanding continuity rather than character development. Blue wrote that this episode marked the first time Friendship Is Magic fully engaged with intertextuality as a method of communicating on multiple levels, containing Star Trek and Gremlins allusions that go over the heads of younger audiences but serve as "a welcome mat" for adult geek viewers. She compared parasprites to tribbles from Star Trek and the ending of the episode to "The Pied Piper of Hamlin". Blue interpreted Pinkie Pie's character arc as representing the archetype of the geek: possessing necessary knowledge but being socially rejected due to poor communication skills. Blue concluded that the episode signaled both an embrace of brony viewers and a "loss of innocence" for the series, marking the beginning of an "identity crisis" as the show went from being solely a children's program to something that appealed to both children and adults through intertextual references.

== Home media ==
The episode is part of the Season 1 DVD set, released by Shout Factory, on December 4, 2012.

== See also ==
- List of My Little Pony: Friendship Is Magic episodes
