= Green Isn't Your Color =

- My Little Pony: Friendship Is Magic episode
- Fluttershy poses for a photo shoot.
- Episode no.: Season 1 Episode 20
- Directed by: Jayson Thiessen; James Wootton
- Written by: Meghan McCarthy
- Original air date: March 18, 2011
- Running time: 22 minutes

Episode chronology
← Previous "A Dog and Pony Show"	Next → "Over a Barrel"
- My Little Pony: Friendship Is Magic season 1

"Green Isn't Your Color" is the twentieth episode of the first season of the animated television series My Little Pony: Friendship Is Magic. It originally aired on The Hub on March 18, 2011. The episode was written by Meghan McCarthy. In this episode, Fluttershy becomes an unexpected fashion model when a famous photographer chooses her over Rarity's designs, which leads to jealousy and conflicted feelings between the friends while Twilight Sparkle struggles with keeping their secrets.

== Plot ==
External videos
- Green Isn't Your Color (full episode) — Official upload of the episode onto YouTube

Rarity and Fluttershy meet at the Ponyville spa for their weekly get-together. Rarity mentions that fashion photographer Photo Finish will be taking pictures of her outfits at Carousel Boutique and asks Fluttershy to model them. During the photo shoot, Photo Finish disapproves of Rarity's directed poses but becomes interested every time Fluttershy draws back in disappointment after each shot. The session ends abruptly, and Photo Finish declares she has found her next fashion star and schedules another photo shoot for the next day, though she rejects Rarity's designs and reveals that Fluttershy is actually her new star instead of Rarity.

Photo Finish features Fluttershy in a fashion show that brings her instant stardom, and she soon appears in advertisements and fashion magazines across Equestria. Rarity grows increasingly jealous of the attention her friend receives, while Fluttershy secretly loathes the modeling career and tries to evade the constant attention from fans and photographers. Both ponies confide their true feelings to Twilight separately at the spa: Rarity admits her jealousy and desire to see Fluttershy's career fail, and Fluttershy reveals she hates being a model but continues because she believes Rarity wants her to succeed. Twilight promises to keep both secrets but becomes frustrated by the conflicting information.

Hoping to help both her friends, Twilight devises a plan to use magic during Fluttershy's next fashion show to make her perform clumsy and uncouth behaviors on the runway that will ruin her reputation. However, when Rarity witnesses Fluttershy's seemingly awkward performance, she praises it as a revolutionary new modeling style that wins over the audience and makes Fluttershy even more popular. In the dressing room after the show, Rarity finally confesses her jealousy but explains she couldn't watch her friend fail at something she loved, and Fluttershy reveals her hatred of modeling and her assumption that quitting would disappoint Rarity.

The friends recognize their mutual misunderstanding and reconcile. Fluttershy refuses Photo Finish's upcoming photo shoots and walks out with Rarity to return to their normal lives. Having managed to keep her friends' secrets throughout the ordeal, Twilight accidentally blurts out Spike's crush on Rarity when the pressure of secret-keeping finally overwhelms her. Pinkie Pie expresses disappointment in her failure to maintain all the confidences entrusted to her.

== Reception ==
Sherilyn Connelly, the author of Ponyville Confidential, gave the episode an "A-" rating. In her review of the episode in SF Weekly, she defended Rarity's character against criticisms of reinforcing negative female stereotypes. She argued that Rarity's interest in fashion represents her career as a designer rather than mere vanity, and praised her strong work ethic as an example of encouraging young girls to be "creative, hard-working, and career-minded." Connelly remarked that Rarity is the one who breaks the silence between the friends, and observed the episode's moral lesson about the importance of telling good friends how you feel.

In a critical analysis of the episode, author Jen A. Blue praised the character development achieved through exploring three previously underutilized pairings: Rarity–Fluttershy, Twilight–Fluttershy, and Rarity–Twilight. Blue wrote that while Fluttershy's portrayal did not reveal new insights, the decision by the showrunners to keep her consistently shy and reluctant to express feelings throughout the episode was "an excellent call" that avoided making her anxiety appear inauthentic. She compared Twilight to her in "Look Before You Sleep", in which she blindly followed rules while ignoring evidence, treating Pinkie Pie as an expert on friendship despite Pinkie's flawed advice about promise-keeping. Blue commented that determining which promises should be broken requires social nuance "beyond any of the Mane Six at this point." Regarding Rarity, Blue observed that while the character "can be awful" based on previous episodes, this episode revealed "a much more appealing side" through her believable jealousy and ambition when Fluttershy receives the attention Rarity feels she deserves.

Jamie Kingston of WomenWriteAboutComics praised how the episode dealt with the theme of jealousy.

== Home media ==
The episode is part of the Season 1 DVD set, released by Shout Factory, on December 4, 2012.

== See also ==
- List of My Little Pony: Friendship Is Magic episodes
