= Sisterhooves Social =

- My Little Pony: Friendship Is Magic episode
- Rarity realizes that the sapphires on her sister's drawing form a heart around an image of them together.
- Episode no.: Season 2 Episode 5
- Directed by: Jayson Thiessen; James Wootton
- Written by: Cindy Morrow
- Original air date: November 5, 2011
- Running time: 22 minutes

Episode chronology
← Previous "Luna Eclipsed"	Next → "The Cutie Pox"
- My Little Pony: Friendship Is Magic season 2

"Sisterhooves Social" is the fifth episode of the second season of the animated television series My Little Pony: Friendship Is Magic. The episode was written by Cindy Morrow. It originally aired on The Hub on November 5, 2011. In this episode, Sweetie Belle stays with her sister Rarity while their parents are on vacation, but their different personalities lead to conflict when Sweetie Belle wants Rarity to participate in the Sisterhooves Social race.

== Plot ==
External videos
- Sisterhooves Social (full episode) — Official upload of the episode onto YouTube

At the Carousel Boutique, Rarity awakens to the smell of smoke and discovers Sweetie Belle attempting to make breakfast in bed, only to learn that their parents are dropping Sweetie Belle off to stay with her for a week while they vacation. Despite Sweetie Belle's eager attempts to help around the boutique, her efforts consistently result in disasters including burning food, accidentally shrinking Rarity's designer wool sweater in the laundry, and using rare sapphires meant for an important client as decorations on a drawing. Sweetie Belle tries to help by cleaning Rarity's room, but she unknowingly disrupts the carefully organized materials for a new fashion line. This leads Rarity to explain that it is her right to determine which messes are acceptable.

Frustrated with her sister's constant criticism, Sweetie Belle goes for a walk and encounters Apple Bloom, who suggests that she and Rarity enter the annual Sisterhooves Social at Sweet Apple Acres. When Rarity shows no interest in participating and the sisters continue arguing, they angrily agree that they don't need each other, prompting Sweetie Belle to spend the day at Sweet Apple Acres observing how Applejack and Apple Bloom enjoy working together. Meanwhile, Rarity discovers that Sweetie Belle's organization has actually inspired a successful new fashion line and realizes that the sapphires on her sister's drawing form a heart around an image of them together. She regrets her harsh treatment of Sweetie Belle and attempts to reconcile.

Rarity tries to make amends at Sweet Apple Acres, but Sweetie Belle rejects her effort and declares that Applejack is her new big sister. Applejack advises Rarity that sisterhood requires giving rather than just taking. On the day of the Sisterhooves Social, Sweetie Belle prepares to run the obstacle course with Applejack but discovers after finishing in second place that her mud-covered racing partner is actually Rarity, who switched places with Applejack at the first mudhole to participate in the event. Realizing the effort Rarity made to join her and compromise her usually pristine appearance, Sweetie Belle embraces her sister and they reconcile.

== Reception ==
Sherilyn Connelly, the author of Ponyville Confidential, gave the episode a "B+" rating. In her review of the episode in SF Weekly, Connelly wrote that as the youngest of four children and the only girl, she found the episode's lesson that "being a sister is great but hard work, filled with compromise and dirty-ish hooves" was relatable, remarking that this held true for brothers as well.

In a critical analysis of the episode, author Jen A. Blue examined the concept of "Intent Isn't Magic" from third-wave feminist theory, applying it to the interactions between Sweetie Belle and Rarity throughout the episode. Blue wrote that both characters have good intentions but their actions repeatedly cause harm or problems for each other: Sweetie Belle's attempts to help result in property damage and work setbacks for Rarity, and Rarity's peace-making efforts only drive them further apart. She wrote that intent is largely irrelevant because it cannot be known by others, stating that "what you were trying to do only matters to you" and that only changing behavior, rather than relying on good intentions, can resolve conflict. Blue positioned the episode as a natural follow-up to "Lesson Zero", arguing that after recognizing the subjectivity of others, the next step is realizing that you are equally opaque to them and must adjust your actions accordingly. Blue questioned whether writer Cindy Morrow intended to explore this concept, remarking that "Authorial Intent Isn't Magic".

A review from Republibot praised the episode's focus on family relationships, calling it "a different episode" and noting that Twilight Sparkle, Fluttershy, Rainbow Dash, and Pinkie Pie were absent entirely. The reviewer commended Sweetie Belle's characterization, writing that while she had previously been "portrayed as the dim one" among the Cutie Mark Crusaders, the episode showed her "intelligently trying to make sense of Rarity's somewhat contradictory rules" and displaying "an independent streak." The review highlighted Applejack and Apple Bloom's important role, and described the episode as "probably the best Applejack episode since Applebuck Season" and praised how their close relationship contrasted to the conflict between Sweetie Belle and Rarity. Regarding Rarity's character, the reviewer noted that while she "gets a lot of flack from fans for not living up to her Element," the episode demonstrated she can be very generous but has difficulty when she should be.

Raymond Gallant of Freakin' Awesome Network gave the episode a rating of 8.5 out of 10 and described it as "adorable," "lighthearted," and "very entertaining." He praised Sweetie Belle's characterization and called her "perhaps the most adorable character on the show", and wrote that this was her opportunity to shine after being overshadowed by the other Cutie Mark Crusaders in previous episodes. Gallant commended Applejack's increased development and wrote that "of all the ponies, AJ is usually the one who gets lost in the overall shuffle" and that having her as an example of good sisterhood "made both characters look better in the process." He also praised the absence of Twilight Sparkle, arguing that she had been "shoehorned into most of the episodes" and that this episode proved she wasn't necessary to drive every part of the show. However, Gallant criticized Rarity's characterization as "pretty selfish" and out of character for the Element of Generosity, and noted that the episode's pacing was "a bit messy at times". Despite this, Gallant wrote that the episode was one of his favorites of the season.

Anime Superhero News called "Sisterhooves Social" an episode that "does not disappoint" and praised the complex portrayal of Rarity's character while noting that the show maintained "a near flawless record" in handling such delicate character balance. The reviewer stated that the ending "gave me a deeper respect for Rarity" and described it as "thought provoking"; the reviewer wrote that the episode inspired them to reflect on their own sibling relationship.

== Home media release ==
The episode was part of the Season 2 DVD set, released by Shout Factory on May 14, 2013.

== See also ==
- List of My Little Pony: Friendship Is Magic episodes
