= Party of One (My Little Pony: Friendship Is Magic) =

- My Little Pony: Friendship Is Magic episode
- Pinkie Pie, after coming to the conclusion that her friends no longer wish to be her friends, goes insane.
- Episode no.: Season 1 Episode 25
- Directed by: Jayson Thiessen; James Wootton
- Written by: Meghan McCarthy
- Original air date: April 29, 2011
- Running time: 22 minutes

Episode chronology
← Previous "Owl's Well That Ends Well"	Next → "The Best Night Ever"
- My Little Pony: Friendship Is Magic season 1

"Party of One" is the twenty-fifth episode of the first season of the animated television series My Little Pony: Friendship Is Magic. It originally aired on The Hub on April 29, 2011. The episode was written by Meghan McCarthy. In this episode, Pinkie Pie becomes suspicious and depressed when her friends appear to be avoiding her, leading her to believe they no longer want to be her friends.

== Plot ==
External videos
- Party of One (full episode) — Official upload of the episode onto YouTube

Pinkie Pie enthusiastically throws a birthday party for her pet alligator Gummy, inviting all of her friends to celebrate at Sugarcube Corner. The party is a great success and everyone enjoys themselves. Energized by the festivities, Pinkie decides to extend the celebration by organizing an "after-birthday party" for Gummy the following day, but she finds that her friends all seem to be busy. All of their excuses sound unusually urgent and forced, leaving Pinkie confused and disappointed.

Suspicious of their behavior, Pinkie follows her friends and discovers that none of them are actually doing what they claimed. Instead, she observes them meeting secretly and whispering among themselves before heading toward Applejack's barn. When Pinkie tries to approach the barn, her friends actively work to keep her away, making up additional excuses and physically blocking her path.

Convinced that her friends are deliberately avoiding her, Pinkie's mood deteriorates rapidly. She becomes increasingly paranoid and depressed, interpreting their secretive behavior as evidence that they no longer want to be her friends. In her despair, Pinkie retreats to her room at Sugarcube Corner and decides to throw her own party. She creates guests out of inanimate objects, including a bag of flour, a pile of rocks, a clump of lint, and a bucket of turnips. Pinkie begins talking to these makeshift party guests as if they were real, engaging in conversations and asking for their advice about her situation. She becomes defensive when the inanimate objects (controlled and voiced by Pinkie herself) begin criticizing her friends. Her appearance becomes disheveled, and her usual pink, bouncy mane deflates and becomes flat and lifeless as she assumes her friends no longer wish to be her friends.

Meanwhile, Rainbow Dash is sent by the others to retrieve Pinkie and bring her to the barn. When Rainbow Dash finds Pinkie in her room having a tea party with her inanimate friends, she is disturbed by Pinkie's deteriorated mental state but manages to convince her to come to the barn by telling her that the others want to see her.

The truth is finally revealed at Applejack's barn when her friends shout "Surprise!" and explain that the entire secretive operation was to organize a surprise birthday party for Pinkie; in all the excitement of planning Gummy's party, Pinkie had forgotten that her own birthday was approaching. Upon realizing this, Pinkie's depression instantly lifts, and her mane springs back to its normal bouncy form. She is overjoyed to discover that her friends still care about her and had been working together to make her birthday special. The episode concludes with Pinkie happily joining her surprise party.

== Reception ==
In a critical analysis of the episode, author Jen A. Blue praised "Party of One" as "the best episode of Season 1," highlighting its technical achievements in animation, lighting, and visual comedy, while identifying it as an example of what she termed a "character collapse." Blue wrote that the episode transformed Pinkie Pie from a flat, cartoon-like character who lived solely for immediate gratification into a more complex figure by forcing her outside her normal role and making her "become her own foil." Drawing on psychological concepts of the "experiencing self" versus the "remembering self," Blue analyzed Pinkie's breakdown as revealing a character whose self-worth was entirely dependent on others' approval, with no accomplishments or goals to sustain her when alone. Blue connected this portrayal to how women are often defined solely by their relationships rather than their intrinsic worth. Despite praising the episode's execution, Blue commented that Pinkie appeared to learn little from the experience, as her happiness was restored simply by discovering her friends still cared about her, leaving her vulnerable to similar breakdowns in the future and suggesting limitations to the show's central philosophy that "friendship is magic."

Sherilyn Connelly, the author of Ponyville Confidential, gave the episode an "A+" rating, and wrote that it is one of the best episodes of Friendship Is Magic and a "straight-up classic". Brendan Kachel of flayrah wrote that "Pinkie Pie goes insane. And it is awesome." He praised the episode, calling it "one of the best episodes in the series, if not the best." "Party of One" is one of the highest rated Friendship Is Magic episodes on IMDb, with a rating of 9.1 out of 10.

== Home media ==
The episode is part of the Season 1 DVD set, released by Shout Factory, on December 4, 2012. It is also part of the "Pinkie Pie Party" DVD released by Shout Factory.

== See also ==
- List of My Little Pony: Friendship Is Magic episodes
