= Sonic Rainboom =

- My Little Pony: Friendship Is Magic episode
- Rainbow Dash performs the Sonic Rainboom.
- Episode no.: Season 1 Episode 16
- Directed by: Jayson Thiessen; James Wootton
- Written by: M.A. Larson
- Original air date: February 18, 2011
- Running time: 22 minutes

Episode chronology
← Previous "Feeling Pinkie Keen"	Next → "Stare Master"
- My Little Pony: Friendship Is Magic season 1

"Sonic Rainboom" is the sixteenth episode of the first season of the animated television series My Little Pony: Friendship Is Magic. It originally aired on The Hub on February 18, 2011. The episode was written by M.A. Larson. In this episode, Rainbow Dash competes in the Young Flyers Competition in Cloudsdale and attempts to re-create the titular maneuver, which releases a rainbow-colored sonic boom and which she once performed as a filly.

== Plot ==
External videos
- Sonic Rainboom (full episode) — Official upload of the episode onto YouTube

In a field near Ponyville, Rainbow Dash practices her routine for the upcoming Best Young Flyer competition in Cloudsdale after an unsuccessful attempt to train Fluttershy to cheer loudly. She attempts a Sonic Rainboom in the third phase of her routine but fails to gain enough speed and gets launched across town, crashing through the Golden Oak Library window. Rainbow explains the competition to her friends and mentions that the grand prize is a day with the Wonderbolts. Rarity urges Twilight to find a spell that will allow them to access Cloudsdale and support Rainbow during the competition. Twilight successfully casts a spell that gives Rarity butterfly wings as a test subject.

Fluttershy and Rainbow arrive in Cloudsdale and encounter three childhood bullies who deny Rainbow's ability to perform a Sonic Rainboom. The rest of the Mane Six arrive with a spell that allows them to walk on clouds like pegasi. During their tour of the Cloudsdale weather factory, Rarity's wings draw increasingly positive attention from onlooking pegasi. She accidentally dazzles a crowd by letting sunlight shine through them, and an impressed spectator suggests she enter the Best Young Flyer competition. Rarity becomes flattered by the praise and agrees to compete, which sends Rainbow into a nervous fit about her own ability to impress others.

At the Cloudosseum stadium, Princess Celestia and three Wonderbolts arrive to judge the competition. Rainbow becomes so nervous that she switches tags with other competitors to delay her turn while Rarity prepares in the dressing room. The two end up as the last contestants but learn that there is only time for one more act, which means they must perform their routines simultaneously. Rarity dances around the arena and flies above the crowd to project sunlight through her wings, but the heat exposure causes them to evaporate. She plummets toward the ground, inadvertently knocking out three Wonderbolts with her flailing hooves when they attempt to rescue her.

Hearing Rarity's screams, Rainbow immediately dives to save all of them and generates a Sonic Rainboom in the process. She catches them just before they hit the ground and flies them back up to safety as the crowd erupts in cheers. Rarity apologizes for getting carried away with her wings and acknowledges that Rainbow is the best young flyer. Princess Celestia declares Rainbow the winner for her bravery and skill. The three bullies who had doubted Rainbow earlier apologize and ask her to teach them the Sonic Rainboom, but she declines and flies off with the Wonderbolts to claim her prize.

== Reception ==
Sherilyn Connelly, the author of Ponyville Confidential, gave the episode a "B+" rating. In her review of the episode in SF Weekly, she noted that "Sonic Rainboom" was among the most popular episodes, spawning a number of Internet memes.

In a critical analysis of the episode, author Jen A. Blue praised "Sonic Rainboom" as "good stuff" by writer M.A. Larson, commenting that "quality children's television is hard work.". Blue connected Rainbow Dash's struggle to recreate her childhood Sonic Rainboom to Heinrich von Kleist's essay On the Marionette Theater, which compares the unconscious grace of childhood with the conscious effort of adulthood. Blue wrote that Rainbow Dash's journey represents a progression from "sweet innocence, through corrupt experience, to graceful mastery," using an analogy with Christian and alchemical concepts of spiritual development. She wrote that Rarity's temporary wings represented corrupted ambition and the Dunning-Kruger effect, and that her fall was a punishment for her hubris. Blue interpreted the Sonic Rainboom itself as symbolizing the "magic of friendship": Rainbow Dash only achieves it when she stops focusing on winning and instead acts to save others.

Brendan Kachel of flayrah gave the episode a mixed assessment, writing that aside from "the funny introduction" involving Rainbow Dash trying to teach Fluttershy how to cheer loudly, "nothing really stands out" and called it "an average episode, all in all." Johnnie Jungleguts of Yahoo! Entertainment ranked "Sonic Rainboom" the third best episode of My Little Pony and wrote that while most episodes of Friendship is Magic are "plunges into social anxiety," this episode "takes its unease to an edgy limit" as Rainbow Dash progresses from nervousness about a flying competition to "trembling in the fetal position" by the episode's end. Jungleguts praised the episode for providing insight into the aerial pegasus city Cloudsdale and wrote that the story's explosive rescue finale was popular among fans of the show on the Internet.

== In popular culture ==
In the opening scene of the episode, Rainbow Dash attempts to get Fluttershy to cheer loudly, to no avail. This scene has been the subject of various remixes and became an Internet meme.

Rainbow Dash's rainbow-colored hair and tail represent her ability to fly fast enough to cause a sonic rainboom.

— Mary Jane Begin, My Little Pony: The Art of Equestria

"Sonic Rainboom" is one of the most popular episodes among the brony fandom. The episode's opening scene, in which Rainbow Dash attempts to teach Fluttershy how to cheer loudly, has been the subject of various remixes and became an Internet meme.

The Sonic Rainboom maneuver has been referenced in various media. In the Magic: The Gathering trading card game, a Rainbow Dash card was released as part of a Secret Lair collection featuring an ability named "Sonic Rainboom," which allows players to generate additional mana and draw cards once they accumulate sufficient "coolness" through creatures with flying and haste abilities. In the 2017 film My Little Pony: The Movie, Rainbow Dash performs a Sonic Rainboom during the song "Time to Be Awesome", alerting Tempest Shadow of the Mane Six's location.

== Home media ==
The episode is part of the Season 1 DVD set, released by Shout Factory, on December 4, 2012. It is also part of the "Adventures in the Crystal Empire" DVD.

== See also ==
- List of My Little Pony: Friendship Is Magic episodes
