= Feeling Pinkie Keen =

- My Little Pony: Friendship Is Magic episode
- Spike, Twilight, and Applejack (left to right) watch as Pinkie (center) gets another "Pinkie Sense".
- Episode no.: Season 1 Episode 15
- Directed by: Jayson Thiessen; James Wootton
- Written by: Dave Polsky
- Original air date: February 11, 2011
- Running time: 22 minutes

Episode chronology
← Previous "Suited for Success"	Next → "Sonic Rainboom"
- My Little Pony: Friendship Is Magic season 1

"Feeling Pinkie Keen" is the fifteenth episode of the first season of the animated television series My Little Pony: Friendship Is Magic. It originally aired on The Hub on February 11, 2011. The episode was written by Dave Polsky. In this episode, Twilight Sparkle learns about Pinkie Pie's alleged clairvoyance ability called the "Pinkie Sense" and becomes determined to understand it through scientific analysis.

== Plot ==
External videos
- Feeling Pinkie Keen (full episode) — Official upload of the episode onto YouTube

While Twilight Sparkle practices magic spells with Spike, they notice Pinkie Pie sneaking around in an umbrella hat and looking nervously at the sky. Pinkie explains that her tail is twitching and claims that it is a sign from her "Pinkie Sense" that objects will begin falling from the sky, which Twilight dismisses until a frog falls on her face. Fluttershy appears above them with a cart full of frogs and apologizes for the incident before continuing to move the frogs to Froggy Bottom Bogg. Pinkie's tail twitches again and Twilight falls into a ditch; Applejack explains that the townsfolk have learned to listen when Pinkie's body starts twitching, though Twilight remains skeptical about this supposed supernatural ability.

Determined to disprove Pinkie Sense through scientific methods, Twilight hooks Pinkie up to various measuring devices in the library basement to gather data about her predictions. However, the experiments fail to produce results and Twilight becomes increasingly frustrated as each of Pinkie's predictions continues to come true. When Pinkie begins shivering violently and claims she doesn't know what it means but that a "doozy" will happen at Froggy Bottom Bogg, Twilight dismisses the prediction but follows along anyway to witness Pinkie's supposed failure.

The group arrives at Froggy Bottom Bogg to find Fluttershy safe and sound. Twilight begins to gloat about disproving Pinkie Sense until a gigantic hydra rises up behind her and chases them across the bog. Twilight distracts the hydra while her friends cross on stepping-stone pillars, but the creature destroys several pillars and leaves her stranded on the wrong side. Pinkie tells Twilight to "take a leap of faith" while her body wiggles intensely, and when Twilight jumps short of the other side, a large bubble bounces her back up across the remaining pillars to safety.

Just as Twilight congratulates Pinkie for predicting the hydra attack, Pinkie experiences another spell of intense shudders and insists that the hydra was not the doozy she sensed earlier. Frustrated by the enigmatic nature of Pinkie Sense and unable to understand it through logic or science, Twilight's anger flares before she finally gives up and admits belief in the phenomenon despite not comprehending how it works. Pinkie's shudders immediately stop and she reveals that Twilight's acceptance and belief was the real doozy all along.

== Reception ==
Sherilyn Connelly, the author of Ponyville Confidential, gave the episode a "B" rating. In her review of the episode in SF Weekly, she wrote, "just because she can't explain how Pinkie Sense works, that doesn't make it any less real. Significantly, there's no implication that it's beyond explanation, or that it's evidence of an invisible, omniscient pony in the sky. Just that Twilight herself can't figure it out, and that's okay. People who don't watch MLP:FIM usually can't figure out why it's so popular, either."

In a critical analysis of the episode, author Jen A. Blue described "Feeling Pinkie Keen" as "one of the more controversial first-season episodes" and "unquestionably a deeply flawed episode." Blue identified several structural problems, including the "essentially random hydra attack in the third act" which lacked thematic resonance with the main conflict, and criticized Twilight Sparkle as being "badly out of character" throughout the episode, displaying "outright and openly contemptuous" behavior toward her friends that was unprecedented in the series. Blue wrote that the cartoon slapstick was "tonally inappropriate" for My Little Pony, falling on "the cynical side of the cynicism-sincerity binary" by requiring characters who deserve physical punishment. She acknowledged that while the main brony fandom complaint was that the episode was "anti-science", the episode could be read as anti-atheist due to Twilight's portrayal as an angry, contemptuous skeptic who becomes happier after embracing belief, or alternatively as a critique of conspiracy theorists and denialists rather than legitimate scientists. Blue postulated that the episode possibly functioned as "the wish-fulfillment fantasy of a frustrated believer" and "a bit of a 'revenge fantasy' directed toward whichever skeptics pointed out that their beliefs aren't objective facts."

Brendan Kachel of flayrah praised "Feeling Pinkie Keen" as "a string of hilariously violent slapstick". However, Kachel noted that the episode had "one problem with this episode that may lose it fans" due to its "believers vs. non-believers" theme centered around the concept of faith. He wrote that while the episode's moral of "be open to ideas that challenge your beliefs" could apply to both religious and non-religious viewers, the use of the word "faith" typically aligned it with one side of the debate.

In his 2015 article Religion and the Pathologization of Fandom published in the Journal of Religion and Popular Culture, religious history professor Andrew Crome examined how bronies reacted to the episode that many saw as promoting religious belief over scientific thinking. The episode showed Twilight Sparkle struggling to understand Pinkie Pie's seemingly supernatural abilities, which led to angry fan reactions from those who felt the episode was "promoting belief in the supernatural" and being "anti-atheist." Crome found that fans saw themselves as either protecting child viewers from what they considered a dangerous message about accepting supernatural claims without evidence, or reinterpreting the episode as actually criticizing poor scientific practice rather than promoting religion.

== Home media ==
The episode is part of the Season 1 DVD set, released by Shout Factory, on December 4, 2012.

== See also ==
- List of My Little Pony: Friendship Is Magic episodes
