= The Cutie Mark Chronicles =

- My Little Pony: Friendship Is Magic episode
- Rainbow Dash, as a filly, performs her first ever Sonic Rainboom.
- Episode no.: Season 1 Episode 23
- Directed by: James Wootton
- Written by: M.A. Larson
- Editing by: Tom Harris; Rob Renzetti (story)
- Original air date: April 15, 2011
- Running time: 22 minutes

Episode chronology
← Previous "A Bird in the Hoof"	Next → "Owl's Well That Ends Well"
- My Little Pony: Friendship Is Magic season 1

"The Cutie Mark Chronicles" is the twenty-third episode of the first season of the animated television series My Little Pony: Friendship Is Magic. The episode was written by M.A. Larson and directed by supervising director Jayson Thiessen. In this episode, the "Cutie Mark Crusaders", three fillies looking to earn their cutie marks, learn from the older mares of how they earned their own cutie marks; in the process, the older mares realize they share a common destiny. The episode has been praised as having a complex plot for a children's program that emphasizes the core values of the overall show.

== Plot ==
External videos
- The Cutie Mark Chronicles (full episode) — Official upload of the episode onto YouTube

While the Cutie Mark Crusaders fillies—Apple Bloom, Scootaloo and Sweetie Belle—continue to try to earn their cutie marks, they come up with an idea to try to learn how other ponies in town got theirs, with Scootaloo insisting they talk to her idol, Rainbow Dash, first. On the way into town to find Rainbow Dash, they encounter the other five main characters and learn of their cutie mark stories (each told in flashbacks when they were younger fillies), much to Scootaloo's impatience:

- Applejack had left her apple orchard in Ponyville to live in Manehattan with her Uncle and Aunt Orange. The high life did not suit her well, and after seeing a rainbow that pointed her back to Ponyville, she returned home, getting her cutie mark on arrival.
- Fluttershy was a shy, clumsy pegasus in flight camp and teased by bullies. Rainbow Dash stood up for her and challenged the bullies to a race, but at the start, their speed knocked Fluttershy off a cloud towards the ground. She was caught by a flock of butterflies, and soon discovered that she loved being with the animals on the ground. After a distant explosion scared the animals, she found that she was also able to communicate and empathize with them, earning her cutie mark.
- Rarity was preparing costumes for a school play but felt they were not her best work. That night, her unicorn horn dragged her across the landscape to a giant rock, leaving her to question why it did that. A distant explosion shattered the rock, revealing it to be full of gems, which Rarity was able to use to further improve her costumes. She earned her cutie mark as the audience cheered the students' performance.
- Twilight Sparkle was enthralled by magic and Princess Celestia as a filly, and excited when her parents enrolled her in Celestia's school for gifted unicorns. She had not expected an entrance exam, which required her to hatch an egg using magic, and could not do so. When a sudden explosion from outside startled her, Twilight inadvertently triggered an uncontrollable surge of magic which hatched the egg (which proved to contain the baby dragon Spike) and caused several bizarre side effects that Celestia quickly reversed. Welcoming Twilight into the school, Celestia offered to be her mentor so she could learn to harness her raw magical ability. As Twilight celebrated, Celestia pointed out that she had earned her cutie mark.
- Pinkie Pie grew up on a rock farm where she and her family enjoyed few pleasures. As she tended to the rocks one day, the same rainbow from the other backstories tore through the sky and briefly cleared away the clouds and curling up her hair. At the sight of the rainbow that followed, Pinkie became elated and knew she had to share that feeling with others. Overnight, she set up a party in the farm's silo. When her family discovered this, Pinkie first thought she had disappointed them, but they all soon broke out into smiles and joined in the fun, causing Pinkie to earn her cutie mark.

The Crusaders finally make it to Sugarcube Corner where Rainbow Dash is waiting for them. She goes into her own story, continuing from Fluttershy's: as she continued to race the bullies, she put on a burst of speed and executed her first Sonic Rainboom (a combination of a sonic boom and a rainbow-coloured effect), gaining her cutie mark as well as winning the race. The Sonic Rainboom unexpectedly allowed Rainbow Dash's friends to earn their cutie marks, and after they realize this, the Mane Six conclude that they are much closer than they all expected. Though Apple Bloom and Sweetie Belle empathize with the older ponies as they share a hug, Scootaloo feels the entire effort was all for naught and suggests another activity to get their cutie marks, before being dragged into a hug with her friends.

== Reception ==
Emily VanDerWerff, writing on the overall show for The A.V. Club, used "The Cutie Mark Chronicles" as an example of the show's overarching theme of "the way that little kids often look up to and emulate teenagers, even though those teenagers don’t have it all together" and letting the viewer "in on their insecurities and problems". She further praised the episode as one that "boasts a surprisingly complex story (for kids TV) where all of the flashbacks tie together and reinforce the sense of destiny".

Sherilyn Connelly, the author of Ponyville Confidential, gave the episode an "A+" rating. In her review of the episode in SF Weekly, Connelly considered the episode as "one of Season 1's most complicated, carefully constructed stories, working with what we know about the characters and expanding their backstories while continuing to build the show's world". Connelly continued that it was "a confident episode that would have been a great season finale".

== Home media ==
The episode is part of the Season 1 DVD set, released by Shout Factory, on December 4, 2012. It is also part of the "Adventures of the Cutie Mark Crusaders" DVD, which was released on February 24, 2015.
