= Suited for Success =

- My Little Pony: Friendship Is Magic episode
- Rarity (center) is overwhelmed by the demands of her friends during "The Art of the Dress".
- Episode no.: Season 1 Episode 14
- Directed by: Jayson Thiessen; James Wootton
- Written by: Charlotte Fullerton
- Original air date: February 4, 2011
- Running time: 22 minutes

Episode chronology
← Previous "Fall Weather Friends"	Next → "Feeling Pinkie Keen"
- My Little Pony: Friendship Is Magic season 1

"Suited for Success" is the fourteenth episode of the first season of the animated television series My Little Pony: Friendship Is Magic. It originally aired on The Hub on February 4, 2011. The episode was written by Charlotte Fullerton. In this episode, Rarity attempts to design dresses for her friends to wear to the Grand Galloping Gala, but learns the importance of staying true to her artistic vision when their input compromises her designs.

== Plot ==
External videos
- Suited for Success (full episode) — Official upload of the episode onto YouTube

When Twilight Sparkle brings an old, tattered dress to Rarity's boutique for repairs in preparation for the upcoming Grand Galloping Gala, Rarity is horrified by the garment's condition. Refusing to simply mend the dress, she enthusiastically volunteers to create brand new, elegant gowns for Twilight and all of her friends, viewing it as an opportunity to showcase her design talents for Canterlot's high society. Rarity throws herself into her work with passion, designing five unique dresses that reflect each friend's personality and style. She creates an astronomical-themed gown for Twilight Sparkle, a nature-inspired dress for Fluttershy, a simple yet elegant design for Applejack, a flowing creation for Rainbow Dash, and a cheerful, party-themed dress for Pinkie Pie.

When Rarity presents the completed dresses to her friends, they are polite but dissatisfied with the results. Each friend requests specific changes: Twilight wants the dress to be more historically and astronomically accurate, Rainbow Dash finds her dress too "frilly" and wants it to be "20% cooler", Fluttershy considers her dress too flashy and requests a more subdued design, Applejack finds hers too fancy for her tastes, and Pinkie Pie wants more decorative elements. Despite her artistic reservations, Rarity agrees to accommodate all their requests. As Rarity works to incorporate each friend's feedback, their demands become increasingly excessive and contradictory. Rarity becomes increasingly stressed as she struggles to fulfill these conflicting visions.

Unknown to Rarity, Spike has contacted Hoity Toity, Canterlot's most prestigious fashion critic, and arranged for him to attend a special fashion show to evaluate Rarity's work. When Spike reveals this surprise, Rarity is both thrilled and terrified at the opportunity. The fashion show proceeds with the redesigned dresses, which have become gaudy, over-the-top creations that bear no resemblance to Rarity's original vision. Hoity Toity and the audience are visibly disgusted and appalled by the excessive, clashing designs. Rarity is devastated and convinced that her career as a fashion designer is ruined.

Realizing that their demands have sabotaged Rarity's work and hurt their friend, the Mane Six feel deeply guilty and secretly work together to complete Rarity's own dress for the Gala using her original design aesthetic. They then approach Hoity Toity and convince him to give Rarity a second chance by attending another fashion show. At the second show, the friends model Rarity's original designs, which impress Hoity Toity, who offers to feature her work in his boutique. Rarity's reputation is restored, and both she and her friends learn valuable lessons about respecting artistic vision and the importance of trust in friendship.

== Reception ==
Although it would be easy to define Rarity as superficial because she gets wrapped up in making things look beautiful, she also demonstrates a generosity of spirit that can overshadow her desire to remake the world. In the Season 1 episode "Suited for Success," Rarity designs beautiful outfits for her pony friends to wear at the Grand Galloping Gala, only to hear each friend decide to make "suggestions" to improve her designs. As any good designer knows, design by committee can be... disastrous.

Fortunately, with the help of Spike and her pony friends, Rarity gets another chance to impress Hoity Toity, the fashion maven from Canterlot, with a private showing of her original gown designs. Hoity Toity exclaims that they are "simply magnificent" and "absolutely amazing"—truly a shining moment for Rarity.

— Mary Jane Begin, My Little Pony: The Art of Equestria

Panels from the storyboard of "Suited for Success"

In a critical analysis of the episode, author Jen A. Blue described "Suited for Success" as the series' first "truly flawless" episode, and that it successfully balanced different approaches the show had been exploring throughout the first season. Blue praised the episode for giving every member of the Mane Six a meaningful role while keeping all characters thoroughly in character, and highlighted its character-based humor, real stakes for Rarity in terms of business success and professional pride, and the way it avoided making any character a villain. She identified a Stephen Sondheim reference in Rarity's song (Putting It Together from the musical Sunday in the Park with George) and noted the episode's generation of enduring memes, particularly "twenty percent cooler." Blue wrote that this episode marked a turning point where the series began actively seeking to transform its viewers; the main characters' demands on Rarity is an allegory for different types of fan behaviors and complaints commonly found in Internet fan communities. She concluded that the episode showed how fans can learn to embrace a creator's artistic vision instead of insisting on imposing their own preferences.

Sherilyn Connelly, the author of Ponyville Confidential, gave the episode an "A+" rating, and wrote that it is one of the best episodes of Friendship Is Magic.

Kieran Hair, writing in WhatCulture, remarked that the episode taught a problematic lesson about prioritizing appeasing friends over legitimate customer expectations. Hair criticized the episode's framing of the friends' complaints as ingratitude toward Rarity's generosity, as they were actually paying clients who had legitimate rights to request alterations to products they purchased. He contended that the episode incorrectly characterized a business transaction as an act of generosity, noting that Rarity was performing paid work rather than giving gifts, and that the moral lesson ignored the friends' consumer rights in favor of portraying their design requests as unreasonable demands.

== In popular culture ==
The episode generated one of the series' most enduring Internet memes with the phrase "20% cooler", spoken by Rainbow Dash when critiquing one of Rarity's dress designs during the song "The Art of the Dress". This phrase became one of the show's most recognizable and frequently referenced lines among fans. The phrase was featured on one of the first Friendship Is Magic merchandise items sold at Hot Topic in August 2011, a silhouette shirt of Rainbow Dash with the text "This Shirt Just Got 20 Percent Cooler." At the July 2011 ConnectiCon convention, media analyst Scott Spaziani devoted significant time to examining "The Art of the Dress" during a panel about the series' fandom.

The episode also marked the first appearance of a background character who would become popular among fans as a disc jockey at Rarity's fashion show; following the broadcast, a poll on the fan website Equestria Daily established the character's names as "DJ PON-3" and "Vinyl Scratch". As Connelly noted, despite the episode's fashion-focused content, the episode had a significant cultural impact on the brony fandom. Mary Carreon of OC Weekly wrote that "[Vinyl Scratch] looks suspiciously like Skrillex."

== Home media ==
The episode is part of the Season 1 DVD set, released by Shout Factory on December 4, 2012.

== See also ==
- List of My Little Pony: Friendship Is Magic episodes
