= Iris shot =

Filming technique

An iris shot is a technique used in silent film and sometimes television to emphasize a detail of a scene above all others, more commonly to end or open a scene. The film camera's iris is slowly closed or opened, so that what is visible on film appears in a decreasing or increasing circle, surrounded by black.

The iris shot used at the start of a scene is an iris in and an iris out is used at the end of a film/episode or a particular scene. Iris in is also used after a previous iris out to allow different episodes or scenes to begin in a more natural way. Iris shots are also used to put emphasis on a particular aspect of film, usually something of importance. After the silent film era, the technique became less used, and has mainly been used only for ironic or comedic effect. An example of non-ironic iris shot as part of the grammar of film is found in "Life Lessons", the Martin Scorsese-directed segment of New York Stories.

Non-silent era slapstick and animation—such as that of Red Skelton, Benny Hill, and the Warner Bros. Road Runner cartoons—sometimes employ or emulate the iris shot as an homage to the silent film era. In Walt Disney cartoons, after the title card, they usually begin with an iris in and end with an iris out.

In some cartoons and live-action films (and certain television shows like The King of Queens and Mike & Molly), iris shots are used as a way to break the fourth wall, usually for comedic purposes or to allow characters to interact with the audience (as opposed to a simple fade out or cut to an end). Examples of this include characters trying to escape through the closing iris, addressing the audience with a one liner before the iris closes, or holding the iris open to try and continue a monologue. Mister Rogers' Neighborhood uses this technique at the beginning and end of the Neighborhood of Make Believe segments, usually when the Trolley goes through the tunnel on the left side of the Castle, and through the right side of Mister Rogers' house. Occasionally, graphic overlays are applied to an iris following it to achieve an effect like the iris tearing on the Sesame Street segment "Frazzle" (the ripped paper image) used for the 1997 home video release.

In rare cases, the iris stays closed to a fixed point for the entire shot. This is mostly used to make the audience feel like they are in the film watching them, or hiding watching something that they probably shouldn't. In The Truman Show (Paramount, 1998), for instance, shots are presented as from hidden cameras positioned in small objects such as buttons on shirts.

In some cases, the iris shot is used partially to make a more modern use of it. An example is The Tom and Jerry Show. The 2014 show doesn't have an iris in but it has an iris out after the episode is over. This iris shot is seen twice on the show with the character Toodles requesting an iris out and when the characters discover they are on a live television set, the cue cards request an iris out.

== See also ==
- Gun barrel sequence – A similar visual signature used to iconic effect in the James Bond film series.
