= Rarity (My Little Pony) =

Fictional character from My Little Pony

- My Little Pony character
- Rarity as she appears in "A Dog and Pony Show"
- First appearance: "Friendship Is Magic" (2010)
- Created by: Lauren Faust
- Based on: Glory, Sparkler, and Majesty from the My Little Pony toyline's first incarnation
- Voiced by: Tabitha St. Germain (speaking voice); Kazumi Evans (singing voice)

In-universe information
- Nickname: Rare
- Species: Unicorn
- Title: Element of Generosity
- Occupation: Fashion designer; Shopkeeper; Seamstress; Generosity teacher at the School of Friendship (seasons 8-9); Member of the Council of Friendship (finale)
- Affiliation: Mane Six
- Family: Hondo Flanks (father); Cookie Crumbles (mother); Sweetie Belle (younger sister)

Rarity is a fictional character who appears in the fourth incarnation of Hasbro's My Little Pony toyline and media franchise, beginning with My Little Pony: Friendship Is Magic. She is a close friend of Twilight Sparkle and is a core member of the group of main characters collectively known as the Mane Six. She is voiced by Tabitha St. Germain, and her singing voice is provided by Kazumi Evans.

An elegant, sophisticated, and dramatic anthropomorphic unicorn with a passion for fashion design and beauty, Rarity owns and operates the Carousel Boutique in Ponyville, where she creates clothing and accessories. Rarity represents the Element of Generosity in the Elements of Harmony.

== Appearances ==
=== Fourth My Little Pony incarnation (2010–2021) ===
==== My Little Pony: Friendship Is Magic ====
Rarity is introduced in the series premiere as a sophisticated unicorn with a talent for creating fashionable attire.

In "The Cutie Mark Chronicles", it is revealed that while she was struggling to make costumes for a school play, her horn unexpectedly pulled her toward a large rock, and shortly afterward, she witnessed Rainbow Dash's Sonic Rainboom. This caused the rock to shatter, revealing it to be full of gems. She discovered her talent to find gems to improve her designs, earning her cutie mark of three diamonds.

Throughout the series, Rarity works to establish herself as a renowned fashion designer. In "Suited for Success", she designs dresses for her friends for the Grand Galloping Gala despite their increasingly impossible demands. In "Rarity Takes Manehattan", she enters a prestigious fashion competition in Manehattan, and learns important lessons about keeping her integrity. In "Sweet and Elite", Rarity is torn between attending an elite Canterlot garden party and celebrating Twilight's birthday with her friends. As the series progresses, Rarity opens a second boutique in Canterlot called "Canterlot Carousel" in the fifth season, and a third boutique in Manehattan called "Rarity For You" in the sixth season. She also achieves her dream of designing for Canterlot's elite and royalty on several occasions.

Rarity has a younger sister named Sweetie Belle. Their relationship is developed in episodes like "Sisterhooves Social" and "For Whom the Sweetie Belle Toils", which feature sibling conflicts that ultimately strengthen their bond.

==== My Little Pony: The Movie ====
Rarity helps Twilight prepare for the Friendship Festival in Canterlot before the city is attacked by the Storm King's forces. During their adventure beyond Equestria, she uses her charm and generosity to help win over Capper, a con artist cat whom she befriends by fixing his damaged coat. Rarity willingly gives away her collection of gems to persuade Queen Novo to help them save Equestria. During the final confrontation with the Storm King, she uses her unicorn magic to help defeat the villain and restore harmony to Equestria.

==== My Little Pony: Pony Life ====
Rarity appears as a main character in the spin-off reboot series My Little Pony: Pony Life. Her interest in fashion is downplayed in Pony Life in favor of a greater interest in thespianism.

== Equestria Girls alternate version ==
Rarity's human counterpart in My Little Pony: Equestria Girls.

Rarity's human counterpart is a main character in the Equestria Girls spin-off franchise. She is a student at Canterlot High School and aspiring fashion designer. Beginning in the second film, she is the keytarist of her friends' rock band, the Rainbooms, and gains the ability to create diamond-like force fields as her geode power in the fourth film. In later media, she holds various jobs at fashion stores and in fashion and costume designing.

== Development ==
Faust's original sketch of Rarity for the 2008 MLP FiM pitch bible, where she was originally called Sparkler.

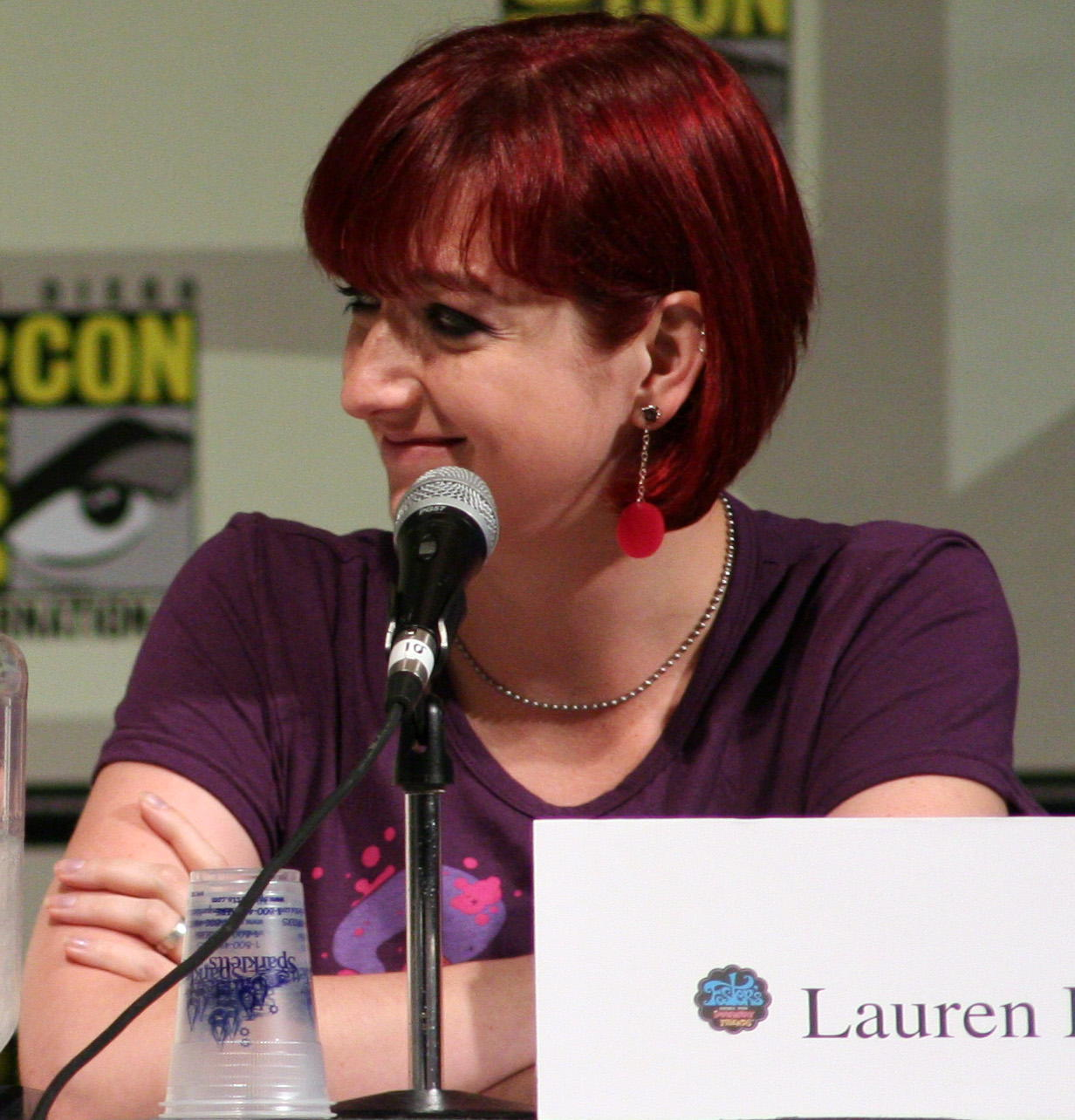
Lauren Faust, developer and initial showrunner of My Little Pony: Friendship Is Magic

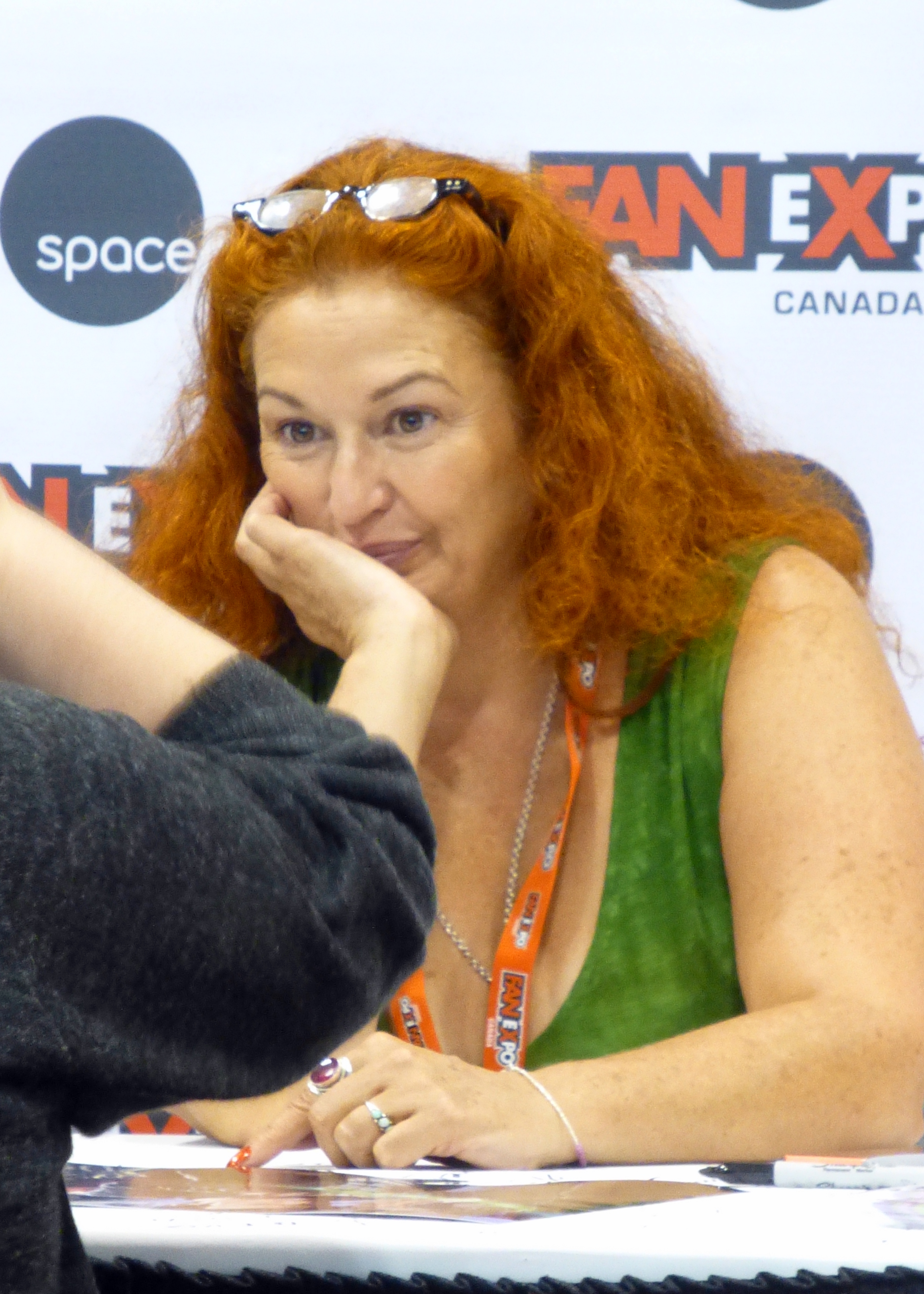
Tabitha St. Germain provided the speaking voice of Rarity.

Unlike Applejack, Rarity—a Unicorn pony—is all about fancy. The main floor of the boutique is about flourish and embellishment. Her whole world is about adornment and bling!

— Jim Miller, My Little Pony: The Art of Equestria

Rarity was based on the Generation 1 unicorns Sparkler and Glory, and her name was taken from a Generation 3 unicorn first introduced in 2006.

In developing Rarity's character, creator Lauren Faust sought to balance studio requirements for fashion play with her desire to avoid stereotypical fashionista tropes. Faust deliberately portrayed Rarity as a businesswoman and fashion designer who created and sold her own designs through her shop, Carousel Boutique. According to Faust's social media posts, the original design for the boutique was called "Carousel Couture" and featured a working carousel with the horses serving as clothing mannequins. Hasbro executives ultimately rejected this proposal, which was one of several reasons that led to Faust's departure from the series during Season 2.

Faust originally intended for Rarity's Element of Harmony to be inspiration, but the production team changed it to generosity because they felt the former was "too much of a thinker, especially for kids." Faust welcomed this change, noting that it "really helped pull [Rarity] away from the stereotypical, unlikable debutante." Faust cited Audrey Hepburn as her biggest influence for Rarity's character and praised voice actress Tabitha St. Germain's performance, which "added a humor to Rarity that was unexpected and wonderful."

== Reception and analysis ==
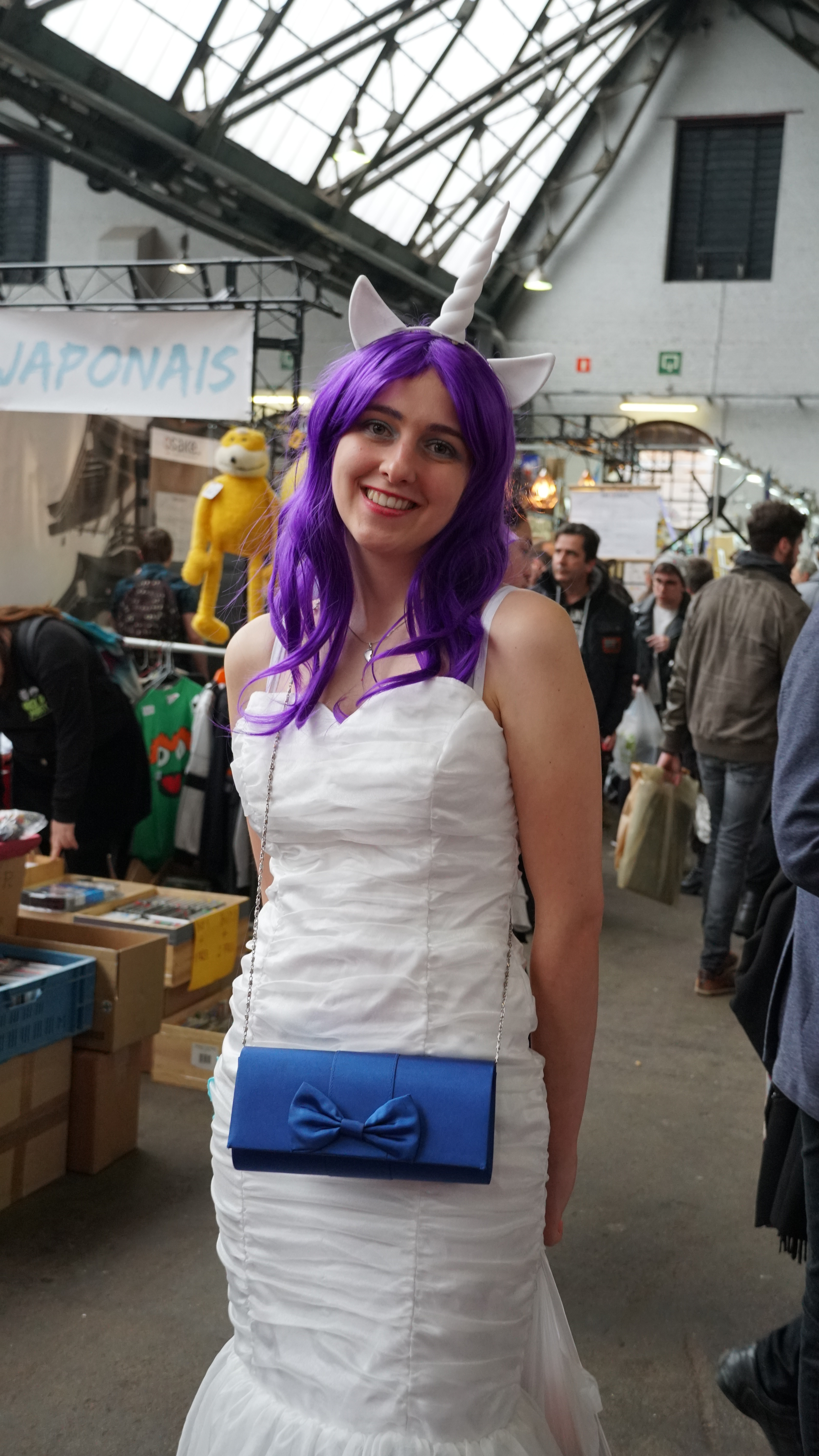
A cosplayer in a Rarity costume

Rarity's speech patterns have been the subject of linguistic analysis. A 2016 study from the University of Vaasa identified that her most notable speech features include her transatlantic accent and occasional use of French words (code-switching). In international dubs, while her accent was often lost in translation, her use of French expressions like "pièce de résistance de la haute couture", "soirée", and "magnifique" was generally preserved in Swedish, Norwegian, and Finnish versions of the show.

According to a study done on the brony fandom, fans of Friendship Is Magic who selected Rarity as their favorite character were more likely to identify as both artists and cosplayers compared to fans of other characters; these fans scored lowest on measures of both general show appreciation and community involvement, though they also reported the highest willingness to openly disclose their interest in the show to others. Fans of Rarity were more likely to report experiencing discrimination among their own fandom. Additionally, the study found that they scored highest on psychological measures of depression, narcissism, and Machiavellianism compared to fans of other characters.

In 2021, researchers from Trisakti University analyzed visual character design in My Little Pony: The Movie and noted that Rarity's design corresponds to purity, cleanliness, and freedom, while her purple curled mane represents imagination, sophistication, and luxury.

Carly Olsen, writing for Screen Rant, ranked Rarity as the sixth most powerful magic user in Friendship Is Magic.

== In popular culture ==
Rarity is a popular character in merchandise and collectibles, with items like the Kotobukiya Bishoujo statue series featuring humanized versions of her character.

According to a July 2015 report in Bustle magazine, Rarity was the second most popular character in clop on Pornhub, after Rainbow Dash and before Pinkie Pie.

In 2019, Rarity appeared as one of three characters featured in a limited-edition Magic: The Gathering crossover set called Ponies: The Galloping, released as part of a charity collaboration between Hasbro and Wizards of the Coast to benefit Extra Life and Seattle Children's Hospital.

== See also ==
- My Little Pony: Friendship Is Magic fandom
