= Rainbow Dash =

Fictional character from My Little Pony

- My Little Pony character
- Rainbow Dash as she appears in "The Ticket Master"
- First appearance: "Friendship Is Magic – Part 1" (2010)
- Created by: Lauren Faust
- Based on: Firefly from the My Little Pony toyline's first incarnation
- Voiced by: Ashleigh Ball

In-universe information
- Nicknames: Dashie; RD; Dash; Rainbow Crash
- Species: Pegasus
- Title: Element of Loyalty
- Occupation: Weather manager; Wonderbolt (seasons 6–9); Captain of the Wonderbolts (finale); Loyalty teacher at the School of Friendship (seasons 8–9); Member of the Council of Friendship (finale)
- Affiliation: Mane Six; The Wonderbolts
- Family: Bow Hothoof (father); Windy Whistles (mother)
- Relatives: Scootaloo (sister by choice; her No. 1 fan)

Rainbow Dash is a fictional character who appears in the fourth incarnation of Hasbro's My Little Pony toyline and media franchise, beginning with My Little Pony: Friendship Is Magic (2010–2019). She is a close friend of Twilight Sparkle, serving as a core member of the group of main characters collectively known as the Mane Six. She is voiced by Ashleigh Ball, who also voices Applejack.

An athletic, cocky, and tomboyish anthropomorphic pegasus with a talent for speed and obsession with adventure, Rainbow Dash works as Ponyville's weather manager and dreams of joining an elite aerial aerobatics team called the Wonderbolts. Rainbow Dash represents the Element of Loyalty in the Elements of Harmony. She lives in a cloud house above Ponyville with her pet tortoise, Tank.

Rainbow Dash's character design has resonated with many LGBTQ+ fans and allies, establishing her as a queer icon while also drawing criticism from some conservative groups.

== Appearances ==
=== Fourth My Little Pony incarnation (2010–2021) ===
==== My Little Pony: Friendship Is Magic ====
Rainbow Dash is introduced in the series premiere as a boastful and athletic pegasus who assists in maintaining the weather and clearing the skies in Ponyville, while aspiring to join the Wonderbolts, an elite team of pegasi who demonstrate exceptional aerial skills and athleticism. Throughout the series, Rainbow Dash helps defeat various villains and encounters challenges that test her loyalty to her friends.

In the episode "Sonic Rainboom", Rainbow Dash performs a Sonic Rainboom, a move that allows her to create a rainbow-colored sonic boom. In "The Cutie Mark Chronicles", it is revealed that Rainbow Dash's first Sonic Rainboom as a filly simultaneously helped her friends discover their special talents.

Although she displays an arrogant antipathy towards reading and intellectual endeavours, she becomes an avid reader of novels starring Daring Do, an Indiana Jones-esque pegasus treasure hunter. She meets the real Daring Do in the episode "Daring Don't" and occasionally participates in her adventures in later seasons.

Rainbow Dash also becomes a surrogate big sister to Scootaloo, a pegasus filly and member of the Cutie Mark Crusaders who idolizes her.

In later seasons, Rainbow Dash continues to pursue her dream of joining the Wonderbolts. She is accepted into the Wonderbolts Academy in the third season, gets accepted into the Wonderbolts Reserves in the fourth season and eventually becomes a full-time member in the sixth season. By the series finale, she becomes the captain of the Wonderbolts.

==== My Little Pony: The Movie ====
Rainbow Dash helps Twilight Sparkle prepare for the Friendship Festival in Canterlot before the city is attacked by the Storm King's forces. She journeys with her friends beyond Equestria, using her speed and aerial abilities to help overcome obstacles and enemies they encounter along the way, and notably helps convince Captain Celeano and her pirate crew to defect from the Storm King become their allies.

==== My Little Pony: Pony Life ====
Rainbow Dash appears as a main character in the spin-off reboot series My Little Pony: Pony Life.

=== Equestria Girls alternate version ===
Rainbow Dash's human counterpart in My Little Pony: Equestria Girls

Rainbow Dash's human counterpart appears in the Equestria Girls spin-off franchise as an athletic student of Canterlot High School. In the first film, Pinkie Pie states that she is the captain of every sports team at the school. Rainbow Dash is also the founder, lead vocalist, electric guitarist and songwriter of her friends' band The Rainbooms, introduced in the second film, and obtains superhuman speed as her geode power in the fourth film.

== Development ==
Faust's original sketch of Rainbow Dash for the FiM pitch bible in 2008, where she had a different cutie mark and was originally called Firefly.

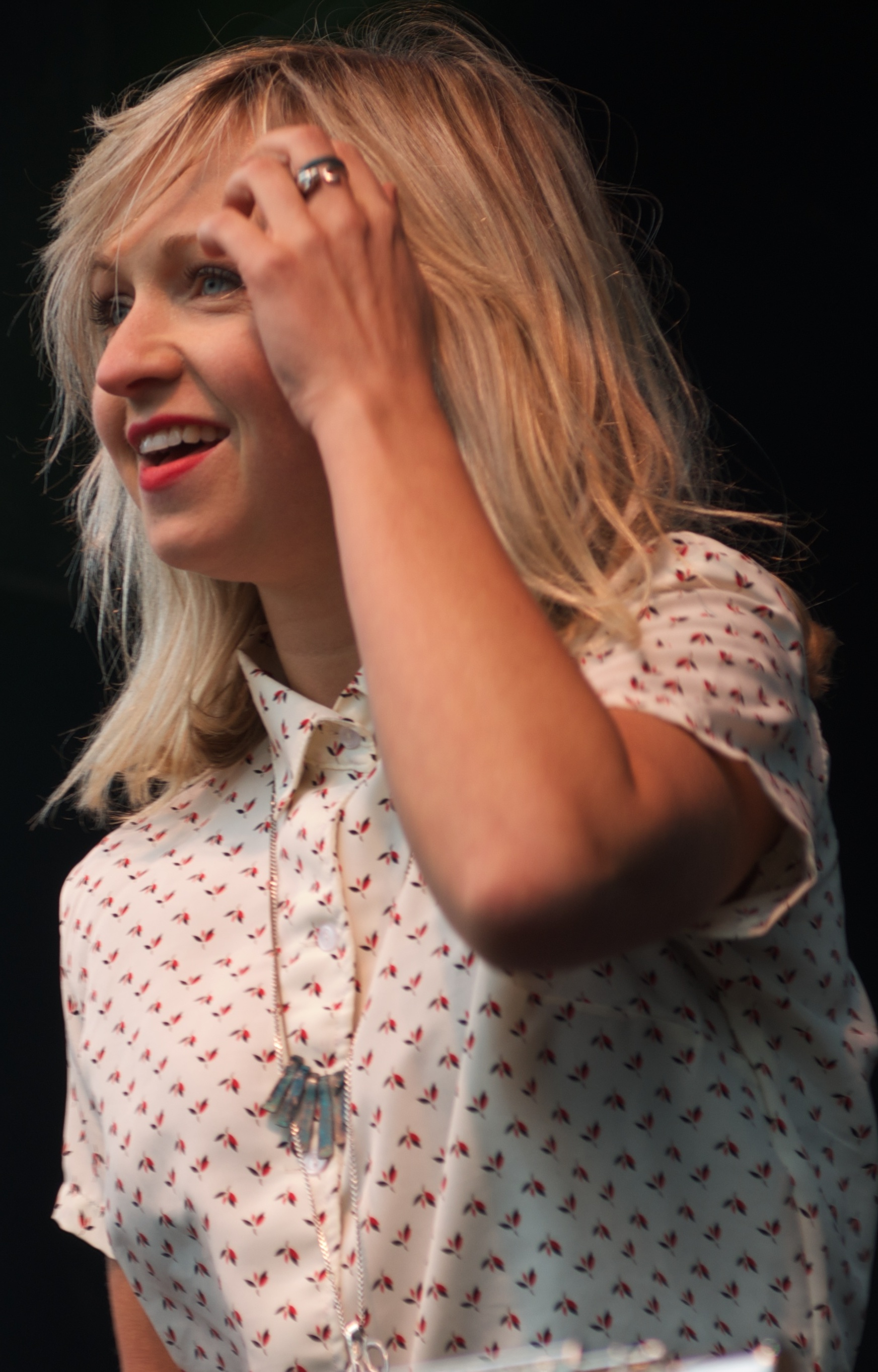
Ashleigh Ball provided the voice of Rainbow Dash.

Rainbow Dash was inspired by the Generation 1 pony Firefly, who was also an active, daring pegasus who liked to fly at high speeds. In addition, Rainbow Dash's name and colour scheme were taken from a Generation 3 earth pony first introduced in 2003.

Lauren Faust struggled to find a suitable aspect for Rainbow Dash's Element of Harmony, seeing the character as "self-absorbed and rather irresponsible". She eventually settled on the Element of Loyalty because it "brought out [Rainbow Dash's] positive traits". She is voiced by Ashleigh Ball, who also voices Applejack.

According to author Mary Jane Begin, "Rainbow Dash's expressions are all about body movement and gesture. Although her face clearly demonstrates her state of mind, her body is in constant expressive motion."

== Reception and analysis ==
Rainbow Dash has been praised for breaking gender stereotypes by being competitive, athletic, and ambitious. Critics have noted that her character is a positive role model for young girls by showing that they can be both athletic and feminine. During the early development of the series, there were concerns among the creative team that Rainbow Dash's tomboy characteristics might be "too boyish" for the target audience to relate to her. Faust struggled to find a suitable aspect for Rainbow Dash's Element of Harmony, seeing the character as "self-absorbed and rather irresponsible". She eventually settled on the Element of Loyalty because it "brought out [Rainbow Dash's] positive traits".

Rainbow Dash's tomboyish character traits and distinctive rainbow-colored appearance resonated with many LGBTQ+ fans and allies during the show's early seasons. This inadvertently established her as a queer symbol, but also drew criticism from some conservative groups.

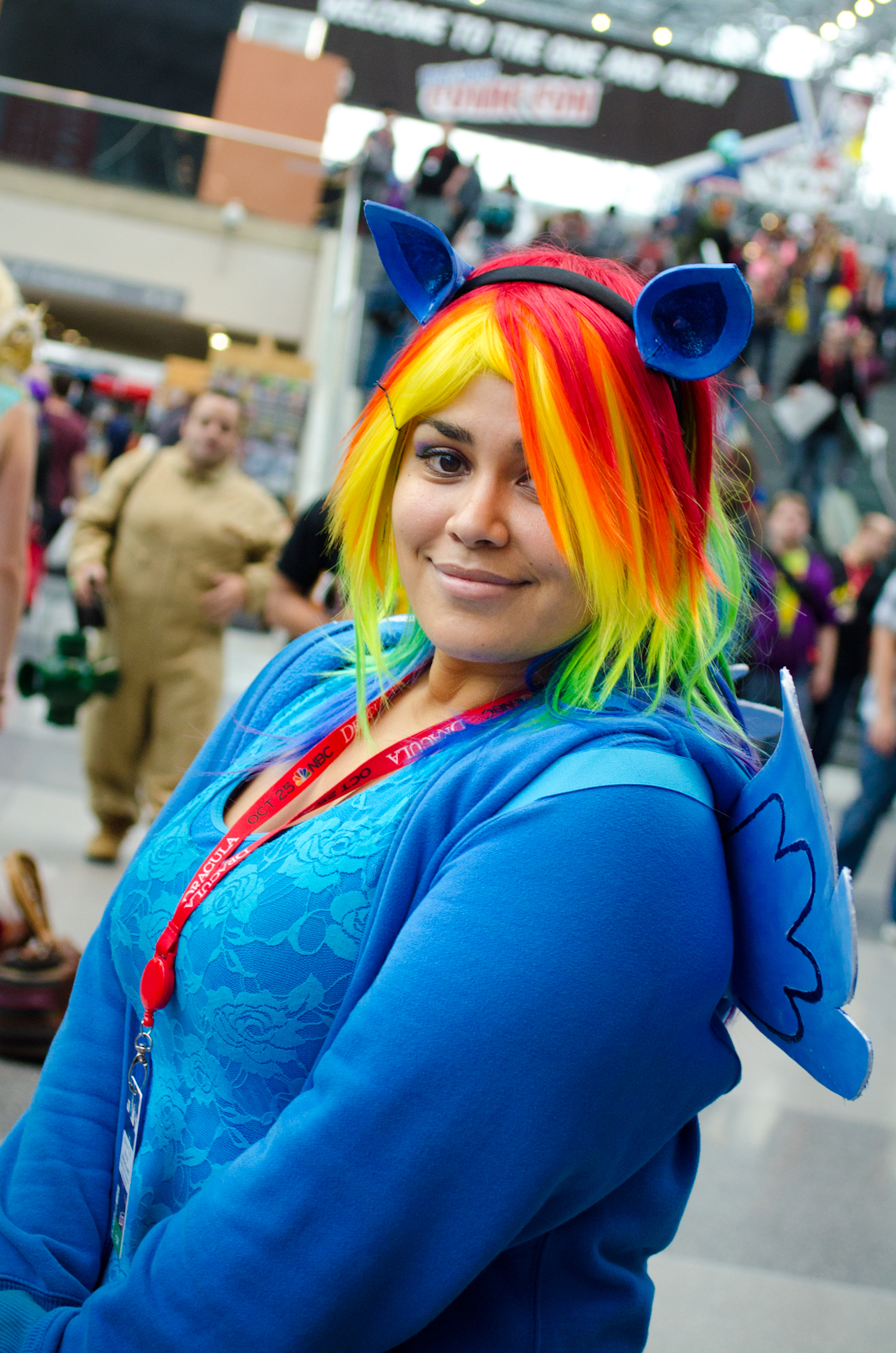
A cosplayer in a Rainbow Dash costume

Rainbow Dash's character has been documented to resonate strongly with children on the autism spectrum, providing a point of connection and communication for therapists working with these children. Rainbow Dash has also been the subject of academic analysis regarding gender and sexuality representation, with some authors noting how fans debate her sexuality based on her "butch" coding and rainbow-colored appearance while challenging heteronormative assumptions about children's media.

In March 2014, a 9-year-old boy was bullied and physically assaulted by classmates for wearing a Rainbow Dash backpack to school. The school initially asked the boy to leave the backpack at home, calling it a "trigger for bullying". The brony fandom, along with voice actors and celebrities, defended the boy's actions, and the school ultimately reversed its decision.

In 2021, researchers from Trisakti University analyzed visual character design in My Little Pony: The Movie and noted that Rainbow Dash's design symbolizes clear thinking and trustworthiness, while her rainbow-colored mane visually reinforces her cheerful disposition and energetic personality.

=== In popular culture ===
Rainbow Dash's catchphrase from the episode "Suited for Success", "20% cooler", became an Internet meme. This phrase has transcended the show itself, appearing in fan works like the song "20 Percent Cooler" by Ken Ashcorp and appearing in shirts sold at Hot Topic. The Kotobukiya Bishoujo statue series features humanized versions of her character. In September 2023, she was one of the four Friendship Is Magic characters included in the Magic: The Gathering charity Secret Lair collection "Ponies: The Galloping 2", alongside Fluttershy, Pinkie Pie, and Applejack.

An incident known as the "Rainbow Dash Cum Jar" gained notoriety in 2014 when images of a Rainbow Dash figurine submerged in semen left to boil near a radiator were shared on 4chan. The images spread across various social media platforms and became an Internet meme. According to a July 2015 report in Bustle, the most popular character in clop on Pornhub was Rainbow Dash, followed by Rarity and Pinkie Pie.

In 2020, researchers from Google, UC Berkeley, and Georgia Institute of Technology named a four-legged robot "Rainbow Dash" that successfully taught itself to walk using deep reinforcement learning. The robot demonstrated the ability to learn to walk backward, forward, and turn on various surfaces without human instruction or labeled training data. Rainbow Dash was among the first character voices implemented in 15.ai, a text-to-speech website that generates voice lines of fictional characters using generative artificial intelligence. In January 2022, it was discovered that a cryptocurrency company called Voiceverse had generated voice clips of Rainbow Dash (along with those of Twilight Sparkle) using 15.ai, pitched them up to sound unrecognizable, and sold them as NFTs.

Rainbow Dash is a main character in an infamous My Little Pony fan fiction titled Cupcakes, in which she is murdered by a serial killer Pinkie Pie. Offering someone a cupcake has become an inside joke within the fandom; the story begins with Rainbow Dash eating a drugged cupcake offered by Pinkie Pie. She is also a main character in the fan fiction Rainbow Factory (2011), where she manages a secret facility where pegasi are harvested for their "spectrum" to manufacture rainbows. She is also the protagonist of Austraeoh, a 212,744-word long adventure fan fiction. In the film Chip 'n Dale: Rescue Rangers (2022), several G4 ponies—including the Mane Six—appear in a convention scene where Chip 'n' Dale flee from villains.

In December 2023, Russian film database Kinopoisk marked Friendship Is Magic as "18+", with some speculating that it was due to Rainbow Dash's name. In February 2024, Mi Amore Fest—a brony convention in Moscow, Russia—was closed early by organizers after Russian police investigated complaints that the convention promoted LGBTQ+ content. Police conducted two inspections but found no evidence of illegal activity. It was reported that in an attempt to avoid persecution, organizers of the convention had changed Rainbow Dash's rainbow-colored mane to the colors of the Russian flag. The incident occurred amid Russia's restrictions on LGBTQ rights in Russia, following the Russian Supreme Court's 2023 designation of the international LGBTQ movement as an extremist organization.

== See also ==
- List of My Little Pony: Friendship Is Magic characters
- Mane Six
- Elements of Harmony

== Works cited ==
- Begin, Mary Jane (2015). My Little Pony: The Art of Equestria. New York: Abrams. ISBN 978-1-4197-1577-8.
