= James Wootton (animator) =

Canadian animator, storyboard artist, and voice actor

James "Wootie" Wootton is a Canadian animator and character designer. His career began with the Cartoon Network animated television series Ed, Edd n Eddy, created by Danny Antonucci, which premiered on the network on January 4, 1999. Wootton served as a title sequence animator and a storyboard artist during the series' run, which garnered him an Annie Award nomination for the third season episode "Wish You Were Ed" on November 10, 2001. Wootton would later work on George of the Jungle, Kid vs. Kat, Roy, Martha Speaks, My Little Pony: Friendship Is Magic, Packages from Planet X, All Hail King Julien, and Kung Fu Panda: The Paws of Destiny.

== Filmography ==
Year	Work	Credit	Notes
1999–2007	Ed, Edd n Eddy	Storyboard artist, storyboard director, animator: title sequence	TV series
2007	George of the Jungle	Animation director	TV series
2008–10	Kid vs. Kat	Animation director, storyboard artist	TV series
2009	Roy	Key animator	TV series
2009–10	Martha Speaks	Animator: Studio B	TV series
2010–13	My Little Pony: Friendship Is Magic	Co-director, voice of Mule	TV series
2013–14	Packages from Planet X	Director	TV series
2014–17	All Hail King Julien	Director; storyboard artist	TV series
2016	Sausage Party	Storyboard artist	Film
2018	Kung Fu Panda: The Paws of Destiny	Director	TV series
2020	The Willoughbys	Story artist	Film
2021	Trollhunters: Rise of the Titans	Storyboard artist	Film
2021	He-Man and the Masters of the Universe	Storyboard artist	TV series
2022	Blazing Samurai	Storyboard artist	Film

== Accolades ==
Date	Award	Category	Work	Shared with	Result
2001	Annie Awards	Outstanding Individual Achievement for Storyboarding in an Animated Television Production	Ed, Edd n Eddy for "Wish You Were Ed"	—N/a	Nominated
2012	Leo Awards	Best Direction in an Animation Program or Series	My Little Pony: Friendship Is Magic	Jayson Thiessen	Nominated
2016	Daytime Emmy Awards	Outstanding Directing in an Animated Program	All Hail King Julien	Stephen Heneveld, Christo Stamboliev, and Collette Sunderman	Nominated
