= Jayson Thiessen =

Canadian animation director (born 1976)

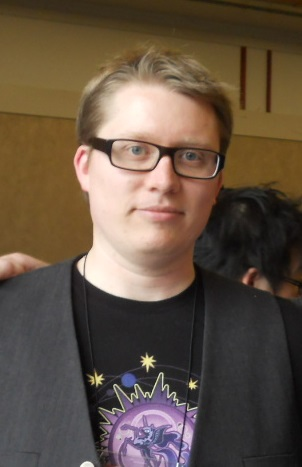
- Jayson Thiessen at Animation On Display 2012 in San Francisco, California
- Born: December 30, 1976 (age 49)
- Occupations: Animator, voice actor
- Years active: 1997–present
- Known for: Pucca; My Little Pony: Friendship Is Magic; My Little Pony: The Movie

Jayson Thiessen (born December 30, 1976) is a Canadian animator and voice actor, best known as the first supervising director of the animated television series My Little Pony: Friendship Is Magic. He also directed its spin-off films Equestria Girls (2013) and Rainbow Rocks (2014), as well as the 2017 feature film adaptation based directly on the television series.

== Career ==
Prior to working on Friendship Is Magic, Jayson co-directed the second season of the Pucca television series and served as the animation supervisor for the first season of George of the Jungle from 2007 to 2008.

He was the supervising director for the first four and a half seasons of My Little Pony: Friendship Is Magic, and would occupy the position of executive producer (or showrunner) from season 2 until halfway through season 5. He also provided some voices, most notably Bulk Biceps and Doctor Whooves. He also directed the first two My Little Pony: Equestria Girls films, Equestria Girls (2013) and Rainbow Rocks (2014), as well as directing Rainbow Rocks' companion animated shorts. Halfway into season five, he stepped down from his role in the series as his attention shifted to directing the 2017 theatrical film based directly on the series; his role as supervising director would be occupied by Jim Miller for the remainder of the series' run. As such, his role in the series diminished into a consulting director for both the second half of season 5 and the third Equestria Girls film, My Little Pony: Equestria Girls – Friendship Games (2015), which was his final involvement in the Equestria Girls spin-off franchise (although he did direct the film's 5 companion animated shorts). After the season 5 finale, his focus completely shifted to directing the film. Season six was the first season in which he had no involvement in, and he also had no involvement in any of the final three seasons of the series even after the film was released in theaters on October 6, 2017.

He directed eight episodes of Cleopatra in Space, an animated series which premiered on DreamWorks Channel in Southeast Asia in late November 2019 and was part of the offerings of the NBC streaming service Peacock in April 2020.
