= My Little Pony: Friendship Is Magic season 5 =

My Little Pony: Friendship Is Magic
- Season 5
- DVD cover
- No. of episodes: 26

Release
- Original network: Discovery Family
- Original release: April 4 – November 28, 2015

Season chronology
- ← Previous; Season 4 Next → Season 6

The fifth season of the animated television series My Little Pony: Friendship Is Magic, developed by Lauren Faust, originally aired on the Discovery Family channel in the United States. The series is based on Hasbro's My Little Pony line of toys and animated works and is often referred by collectors to be the fourth generation, or "G4", of the My Little Pony franchise. Season 5 of the series premiered on April 4, 2015 on Discovery Family, an American pay television channel partly owned by Hasbro, and concluded on November 28.

The show follows a pony named Twilight Sparkle as she learns about friendship in the town of Ponyville. Twilight continues to learn with her close friends Applejack, Rarity, Fluttershy, Rainbow Dash and Pinkie Pie. Each represents a different face of friendship, and Twilight discovers herself to be a key part of the magical artifacts, the Elements of Harmony. The ponies share adventures and help out other residents of Ponyville, while working out the troublesome moments in their own friendships.

== Development ==
=== Concept ===
Teasers for the season were provided by the show staff at the 2014 San Diego Comic-Con, including episodes centered around Twilight coping with the loss of the original library, the entire Pie family, Princess Luna dealing with a nightmare, and a 100th special episode focusing on the background characters. The staff also showed a brief animatic video from the first planned episode, showing the ability of Twilight's castle to direct the main characters to friendship problems around Equestria. Episodes showing more of the castle, about the six main characters, Pinkie Pie "breaking the fourth wall", Rainbow Dash saying "woah woah woah", and "confetti explosions" were to be expected.

The show's fifth season features Twilight continuing her journey of becoming a princess in Equestria with the help of her friends; they discover that her new castle includes a magical map that highlights troubles across Equestria for them to resolve. In the two-part premiere, they come across a town indicated on the map where all of its pony citizens have an equals sign as their cutie mark and odd, creepy smiles.

On February 25, 2015, it was announced at Australia's 2015 PonyCon that the show would have a second Christmas-themed episode. Another episode featured the Smooze, a gelatinous villain from the Generation 1 1986 film, My Little Pony: The Movie.

=== Production ===
In an interview with World Screen, Stephen Davis announced that the series was going into its fifth season. On May 7, 2014, the series was renewed for a fifth season consisting of 26 episodes, with a tentative broadcast slated for April 4, 2015.

On June 17, 2014, Business Wire released a press release confirming that it would premiere sometime in the fourth quarter of 2014, but it was later revised by Hasbro. At BronyCon 2014, G.M. Berrow announced that she wrote an episode, which focused on Pinkie Pie.

== Promotion ==
From November 17 to December 22, 2014, the official My Little Pony YouTube channel released six weekly teaser trailers for the upcoming fifth season, each featuring one of the Mane Six as well as giving a premiere date on early 2015. Some scenes from "The Cutie Map" were teased in Rainbow Dash's and Rarity's recap videos for the season 5 teasers.

On January 19, 2015, a new trailer was released at PoNYCon in Brooklyn on February 16 by Friendship Is Magic season four directors Jayson Thiessen and Jim Miller; on that day, Thiessen and Miller shared some concept art of various characters and settings for this season, as well as a trailer that was originally planned to premiere at the convention was shown.

On March 5, 2015, Entertainment Weekly released another trailer revealing a new villain with commentary on the fifth season from Hasbro's executive director Brian Lenard and co-executive producer Meghan McCarthy.

Under the approval of Discovery Family and Hasbro, BABSCon showed the entire two-part season five premiere commercial-free on the same day as it premiered on the United States on April 4, 2015.

On April 7, 2015, Tina Guo revealed via Instagram that the one-hundredth episode involved Octavia Melody having an Electric Cello Dubstep situation and that the episode would on June 13, 2015.

On April 27, 2015, writer Amy Keating Rogers revealed via Twitter that she left the Friendship Is Magic writing staff due to her new full-time job as a writer at Disney. She also confirmed that she had written four episodes for this season, including The Mane Attraction, which featured a character voiced by Broadway actress Lena Hall.

On July 9, 2015, Hasbro corrected via Twitter that the season's second half would premiere sometime later in 2015, not the sixth season as previously announced. A month later, on August 11, 2015, it was revealed by Zap2it that the season's second half would premiere on September 12, 2015.

At the 2015 San Diego Comic-Con, it was revealed that Starlight Glimmer would return in the two-part Season 5 finale.

== International broadcast ==
The fifth season premiered in mid-2015 on Treehouse TV in Canada and debuted on November 2, 2015 on Boomerang in Australia.

== Cast ==
=== Main ===
- Tara Strong as Twilight Sparkle
  - Rebecca Shoichet as Twilight Sparkle (singing voice)
- Tabitha St. Germain as Rarity
  - Kazumi Evans as Rarity (singing voice)
- Ashleigh Ball as Applejack and Rainbow Dash
- Andrea Libman as Fluttershy and Pinkie Pie
  - Shannon Chan-Kent as Pinkie Pie (singing voice)
- Cathy Weseluck as Spike

=== Recurring ===
- Nicole Oliver as Princess Celestia
- Tabitha St. Germain as Princess Luna
- The Cutie Mark Crusaders
  - Michelle Creber as Apple Bloom
  - Madeleine Peters as Scootaloo
  - Claire Corlett as Sweetie Belle

=== Minor ===
==== Single role ====
- Peter New as Big McIntosh
- Shannon Chan-Kent as Silver Spoon
- Cathy Weseluck as Mayor Mare
- Nicole Oliver as Miss Cheerilee
- Michael Daingerfield as Braeburn
- John de Lancie as Discord
- Marÿke Hendrikse as Gilda
- Richard Newman as Cranky Doodle
- Michael Dobson as Bulk Biceps
- Britt McKillip as Princess Cadance
- Andrew Francis as Shining Armor
- Trevor Devall as Fancy Pants
- Sylvia Zaradic as Cherry Jubilee
- Kelly Metzger as Spitfire
- Matt Hill as Soarin
- Brian Drummond as Mr. Cake
- Kathleen Barr as Queen Chrysalis

==== Multiple roles ====
- Kelly Sheridan as Starlight Glimmer and Sassy Saddles
- Sam Vincent as Party Favor
- Brian Drummond as Double Diamond, Sheriff Silverstar, and Filthy Rich
- Rebecca Shoichet as Sugar Belle and Night Glider
- Tabitha St. Germain as Granny Smith and Mrs. Cake
- Ashleigh Ball as Open Skies, Lyra Heartstrings, Daisy, and Lemon Hearts
- Ingrid Nilson as Maud Pie, Limestone Pie, and Marble Pie
- Terry Klassen as (young) Hoops
- Nicole Oliver as Tree Hugger and Cinnamon Chai
- Richard Ian Cox as Grampa Gruff and Featherweight
- Brenda Crichlow as Matilda, Amethyst Star, and Zecora
- Peter New as Doctor Hooves, Sunflower, Orchard Blossom, and Igneous Rock Pie
- Andrea Libman as Bon Bon, Pearly Stitch, and Cloudy Quartz
- Tabitha St. Germain as Aloe, Clear Skies, Muffins, Lotus Blossom, Twinkleshine, and Nightmare Moon
- Lee Tockar as Steven Magnet and Gummy
- Kazumi Evans as Octavia Melody, Rose, and Moondancer
- Cathy Weseluck as Sunshower, Lily, and Coco Pommel
- Peter Kelamis as Fashion Plate and Big Daddy McColt
- Chantal Strand as Diamond Tiara and Spoiled Rich

=== Guest stars ===
- Jim Miller as Trouble Shoes
- Garry Chalk as Prince Rutherford
- Rebecca Husain as Minuette
- Jan Rabson as Wind Rider
- Sidika Larbes as Stormy Flare
- Graham Verchere as Pip Squeak
- Ellen Kennedy as Ma
- Lena Hall as Countess Coloratura
- Colin Murdock as Svengallop

== Episodes ==
No. overall	No. in season	Title	Directed by	Written by	Original release date	Prod. code	US viewers (millions)
92	1	"The Cutie Map" (Parts 1 & 2)	Jayson Thiessen (Note: Co-directed by Jim Miller.)	Story by : Meghan McCarthy; Teleplay by : Scott Sonneborn & M.A. Larson	April 4, 2015	501	0.51
93	2	"The Cutie Map" (Parts 1 & 2)	Jayson Thiessen	Story by : Meghan McCarthy; Teleplay by : Scott Sonneborn & M.A. Larson	April 4, 2015	502	0.57
As Twilight settles in her new castle, she and her friends sit on their respective thrones and unwittingly create a magical map showing all of Equestria. When their cutie marks point to a remote location on the map, they decide to investigate and find a village where all the ponies have the same cutie mark, an equal sign. They suspect something is wrong with the townsfolk, particularly after meeting their leader, Starlight Glimmer, who shows that everypony living there have given up their cutie marks and special talents so they can achieve true friendship by being the same. After secretly meeting with ponies who desire their cutie marks again, Starlight takes them to a vault where the cutie marks are kept. Upon arrival, Twilight and her friends are lured into a trap and Starlight takes their cutie marks. Without their cutie marks, Twilight and her friends are trapped in the village while Starlight waits for them to accept their fate. They send Fluttershy, who has been the most open to the townsfolk, to act as though she has accepted Starlight's ways in order to help the others escape. That night, Fluttershy sneaks out and discovers that Starlight never gave up her cutie mark and is using make-up to mask her real one. When Starlight frees the others the next day, Fluttershy exposes her ruse to the townsfolk by splashing water on her. As Starlight flees with the girls' cutie marks, the townsfolk reclaim their own cutie marks and chase Starlight down, successfully recovering the six marks. Starlight manages to escape, while everypony returns to the village to celebrate getting their individuality back.
94	3	"Castle Sweet Castle"	Jim Miller	Joanna Lewis & Kristine Songco	April 11, 2015	503	0.42
As Twilight spends hours helping her friends, they learn that she has been avoiding her castle because she does not feel at home there. They offer to decorate the castle, arranging Spike to take Twilight for a day around Ponyville. In their first attempt, they end up cluttering the castle with their own clashing styles. They try to remove pieces one by one, but only end up satisfied when everything is emptied out, making no progress. Realizing that they all miss Twilight's old home at the destroyed Golden Oak Library, they fashion the tree's roots into a chandelier adorned with gems to remind Twilight of her old memories from Ponyville and inspire her to make new ones. Twilight returns to the castle and is moved by her friends' gift, finding that they have each decorated a different room in the castle themselves.
95	4	"Bloom & Gloom"	Jim Miller	Josh Haber	April 18, 2015	504	0.54
After learning that Babs Seed has earned her cutie mark and is no longer a Cutie Mark Crusader, Apple Bloom begins to worry about getting her own cutie mark. That night, she has a series of nightmares in which her cutie mark appears only for her to either dislike her talent or become cast out by her friends and family. In each dream, a shadowy figure helps remove her cutie mark which only makes the dreams worse. Princess Luna then appears in the dream and shows Apple Bloom that Sweetie Belle and Scootaloo have been having similar dreams about their cutie marks, teaching the Crusaders not to fear who they are or what others think of them. The Crusaders affirm that they will always remain friends by deciding to help Babs face her own anxieties about her cutie mark.
96	5	"Tanks for the Memories"	Jim Miller	Cindy Morrow	April 25, 2015	505	0.65
Rainbow Dash is excited to spend her first winter with her pet tortoise Tank until she learns from Fluttershy that he has to hibernate for the winter. Refusing to let Tank hibernate, Rainbow Dash tries to stop winter from coming, but cannot hold back the efforts of the hard-working weather ponies. She then gets an idea to sabotage the weather factory in Cloudsdale, but accidentally creates a blizzard that speeds up winter instead. After her friends help her cope with saying goodbye to Tank, Rainbow Dash finally agrees to let him hibernate.
97	6	"Appleoosa's Most Wanted"	Jim Miller	Dave Polsky	May 2, 2015	506	0.50
While arriving in Appleoosa for a rodeo, Applejack forbids the Cutie Mark Crusaders from participating after a local outlaw named Trouble Shoes is spotted ruining an upcoming show. Despite this, the Crusaders run off on their own to bring Trouble Shoes to justice in the hopes of earning their cutie marks in the rodeo. When they find Trouble Shoes, they learn that he is actually a kind-hearted yet clumsy pony who causes trouble by accident to which he blames his bad luck on his cutie mark. He agrees to lead the Crusaders back to town, but he is caught and arrested by Sheriff Silverstar and his posse who accuse Trouble Shoes of kidnapping the Crusaders. The Crusaders then break Trouble Shoes out of prison and disguise him as a rodeo clown so he can enter the rodeo like he always wanted, convincing him to view his cutie mark more positively. Trouble Shoes is exposed during his performance, but since the other ponies are entertained by his clumsy routine, they all forgive him and allow him to permanently perform for them after the Crusaders admit they ran away.
98	7	"Make New Friends but Keep Discord"	Jim Miller	Natasha Levinger	May 16, 2015	507	0.31
As the Grand Galloping Gala nears, Discord is disappointed that Fluttershy already invited another friend named Tree Hugger instead of him. Refusing to show his jealousy, Discord creates his own plans to go to the Gala by bringing a slimy creature called the Smooze as his guest. During the Gala, Discord attempts to get Fluttershy to talk to him over Tree Hugger but finds attending to the Smooze to be distracting and stuffs it away in a closet filled with gems and gold. The Smooze digests the treasures and grows to immense size, flooding the Gala, until Tree Hugger lulls it back to a harmless state with soothing music. Finally snapping, Discord threatens to send Tree Hugger into a different dimension, but Fluttershy reprimands him for his behavior. Afterwards, Discord apologizes to both Fluttershy and Tree Hugger, reverts the Smooze to normal and they all enjoy the rest of the Gala together.
99	8	"The Lost Treasure of Griffonstone"	Jim Miller	Amy Keating Rogers	May 23, 2015	508	0.59
When the map sends Rainbow Dash and Pinkie Pie on a friendship mission to the griffon kingdom of Griffonstone, they find the once thriving city is run down ever since the golden Idol of Boreas, the city's symbol of power, was stolen by a monster and fell into a chasm. They also run into Rainbow Dash's former friend Gilda, who is still resentful from her past visit to Ponyville. Rainbow Dash goes to recover the lost idol, believing it will restore Griffonstone's former glory, while Pinkie remains to help the griffons rediscover friendship, starting by helping Gilda improve her scone recipe. When Rainbow Dash gets stuck in the chasm, Pinkie convinces Gilda to help rescue her. Gilda spots the idol teetering on a nearby ledge, but she chooses to save Rainbow Dash instead, and the idol falls into the chasm. Gilda and Rainbow Dash make up, and Gilda is able to use Pinkie's friendship idea to help more griffons become more friendly than before.
100	9	"Slice of Life"	Jim Miller	M.A. Larson	June 13, 2015	509	0.43
Cranky and Matilda are scheduled to be married but realize the invitations that were sent out across Equestria have it set for that day due to Derpy's printing error. They race to reschedule the event for the day, while Twilight and her friends fight off a bugbear attacking Ponyville. During this, the episode highlights various other residents of Ponyville as they prepare for the wedding, such as Dr. Hooves, Derpy, DJ Pon-3, Octavia Melody, Lyra Heartstrings, Bon Bon and Steven Magnet. Eventually, despite the tribulations, the wedding goes off on time and the bugbear is defeated with Mayor Mare, officiating the wedding, commenting on how Ponyville is filled with many varied and interesting characters with their own stories.
101	10	"Princess Spike"	Jim Miller	Story by : Jayson Thiessen & Jim Miller; Teleplay by : Neal Dusedau	June 20, 2015	510	0.26
Twilight becomes exhausted and falls asleep after hosting a large delegation in Canterlot, and Princess Cadance asks Spike to make sure no one disturbs Twilight. When the delegates begin making complaints to Twilight, Spike makes his own decisions on Twilight's behalf instead of waking her. He soon becomes power hungry and tries to complete Twilight's other tasks in her place. However, his poor decisions quickly lead to a chain of disasters across Canterlot, causing the angered delegates to go and confront Twilight. Spike manages to keep them out of her room, but Twilight awakens refreshed and discovers the problems he has caused. Spike apologizes to the delegates, and they help him fix a ceremonial statue made from gemstones as a sign of forgiveness.
102	11	"Party Pooped"	Jim Miller	Story by : Jayson Thiessen & Jim Miller; Teleplay by : Nick Confalone	June 27, 2015	511	0.37
A friendship summit with visiting yaks turns into a disaster when the ponies fail to replicate the yaks' traditions, angering them into declaring war. Feeling pressured by her inability to appease the yaks, Pinkie Pie decides she must bring something from their native land of Yakyakistan to make them feel at home. She embarks on a journey across Equestria and receives help from various ponies, but when she reaches Yakyakistan's gates, she accidentally slides all the way back home on a sled. Pinkie despairs over her wasted effort, but she is inspired by her friends' appreciation of her hard work to share the ponies' own tradition of friendship with the yaks, who are touched and make peace with the ponies.
103	12	"Amending Fences"	Jim Miller	M.A. Larson	July 4, 2015	512	0.28
Twilight becomes distraught after Spike innocently reminds her of the neglectful friend she used to be before moving to Ponyville, so she returns to Canterlot to rekindle her old friendships. Although most of her friends are happy to reconnect with her, Twilight learns that her antisocial friend Moon Dancer has become a total recluse ever since Twilight skipped her first party the day before her move. When Moon Dancer rebuffs all of Twilight's efforts to help her reembrace friendship, Twilight enlists Pinkie Pie to throw another party as an apology. The gesture instead enrages Moon Dancer, who expresses her heartbreak over being dismissed by her friend. Realizing Twilight has invited others who already care for her, Moon Dancer is convinced to forgive Twilight and finally accept her friendship.
104	13	"Do Princesses Dream of Magic Sheep?"	Jim Miller	Story by : Jayson Thiessen & Jim Miller; Teleplay by : Scott Sonneborn	July 11, 2015	513	0.42
Princess Luna's dreams are inhabited by the Tantabus, a parasitic smoke monster that turns her dreams into nightmares. During a dream where Luna, as Nightmare Moon, battles Twilight and her friends, the Tantabus escapes into the six ponies' dreams. Luna enters each pony's dream to catch the Tantabus before it can grow powerful enough to spread its influence into the waking world. Unfortunately, it infects all of Ponyville when Pinkie Pie dreams of sharing ice cream with the whole town, requiring Luna to merge every pony's dreams into one. Despite the townsfolk's efforts to help contain the Tantabus, it grows in size when Luna blames herself for creating it as self-punishment for her actions as Nightmare Moon. Realizing her guilt is what empowers the Tantabus, Luna is able to stop it by forgiving herself. With the Tantabus gone, Luna is finally able to sleep peacefully.
105	14	"Canterlot Boutique"	Denny Lu	Amy Keating Rogers	September 12, 2015	514	0.43
Rarity achieves her dream of opening her own boutique in Canterlot. She makes a variety of dresses, but her business-savvy manager Sassy Saddles focuses on marketing one particular dress, which becomes extremely popular. Sassy tasks Rarity with mass-producing the dress under strict regulations, which causes Rarity to lose her passion for dressmaking. Feeling miserable despite her success, Rarity decides to close the boutique with a going-out-of-business sale of all her unsold designs, which prove to be just as successful as her original dress. This reinvigorates Rarity and convinces her to keep the store open under Sassy's management, who is inspired to follow Rarity's example in dressmaking.
106	15	"Rarity Investigates!"	Denny Lu	Story by : Meghan McCarthy, M.A. Larson, Joanna Lewis & Kristine Songco; Teleplay by : Joanna Lewis & Kristine Songco	September 19, 2015	515	N/A
During a Wonderbolts aerial display in Canterlot, Rainbow Dash is accused of sending Spitfire away on a fake errand to replace her and fly alongside her idol Wind Rider. Seeing this, Rarity investigates the crime to prove her friend's innocence, but her constant habit of acting out a film noir mystery makes Rainbow Dash doubt her. Eventually, Rarity is successfully able to identify the true culprit as Wind Rider, who confesses to framing Rainbow Dash in order to protect his flight speed record. Spitfire then discharges Wind Rider from the Wonderbolts as punishment to which Rainbow Dash is allowed to take his place in the display.
107	16	"Made in Manehattan"	Denny Lu	Noelle Benvenuti	September 26, 2015	516	N/A
When the map sends Applejack and Rarity on a friendship mission to Manehattan, they find their friend Coco Pommel trying to revive her neighborhood's community theater. Unable to find any volunteers to assist, they offer to help Coco by themselves. Applejack takes up the task of repairing the run-down theater at the local park, but she fails to finish before her scheduled time. She instead builds a small stage outside the park, where they attract anypony passing by with a play depicting the original theater's creation. The play is a success and inspires the citizens of Manehattan to do more for their community.
108	17	"Brotherhooves Social"	Denny Lu	Dave Polsky	October 3, 2015	517	N/A
Occurring in the same storyline as "Made in Manehattan", Apple Bloom is disappointed that Applejack cannot participate in the Sisterhooves Social competition with her since she left for Manehattan. Seeing this, Big Mac then decides to enter the competition in Applejack's place by disguising himself as Apple Bloom's fake female cousin Orchard Blossom, much to her embarrassment. During the competition, Big Mac accidentally wreaks havoc in his eagerness to win Apple Bloom a blue ribbon eventually resulting in them getting disqualified. They later reconcile after Big Mac admits that he misses being idolized by Apple Bloom as much as Applejack.
109	18	"Crusaders of the Lost Mark"	Denny Lu	Amy Keating Rogers	October 10, 2015	518	0.30
The Cutie Mark Crusaders help their classmate Pipsqueak win their class's student president election against Diamond Tiara, who is berated by her mother Spoiled Rich for failing to live up to their family's social image. Feeling sorry for Diamond Tiara, the Crusaders offer to help her change her ways so she can earn her classmates' support. When they learn Pipsqueak is unable to fulfill any of his promises as student president, Diamond Tiara attempts to replace him to regain her mother's favor. With the Crusaders' persuasion, however, Diamond Tiara stands up to her mother and lends her family's funds to the school instead. Upon dedicating themselves to helping others understand their talents, the Crusaders simultaneously earn their cutie marks and celebrate with their friends and family.
110	19	"The One Where Pinkie Pie Knows"	Denny Lu	Gillian M. Berrow	October 17, 2015	519	0.33
Shining Armor and Princess Cadance are arriving in Ponyville in a few days, and Pinkie Pie learns from the Cakes that they are going to surprise Twilight and the others with news that they are having a baby. Pinkie promises to keep the news a secret but becomes stressed over maintaining it as she helps with the visit's preparations. When they finally arrive, Shining Armor sets up a scavenger hunt for Twilight and the others to receive a surprise award and Pinkie, barely able to contain the secret, aggressively answers the riddles until they meet Shining Armor and Cadance at Sugarcube Corner. They reveal the surprise, delighting Twilight and relieving Pinkie of her burden.
111	20	"Hearthbreakers"	Denny Lu	Nick Confalone	October 24, 2015	520	N/A
Pinkie Pie invites Applejack and her family to spend Hearth's Warming together at the Pie rock farm. The Apples quickly discover that the Pies have very different traditions around the holiday and are much less joyful than what they are used to. Applejack tries to liven the mood by introducing her family's traditions to the Pies, but in her haste, she causes Holder's Boulder, a giant rock the Pies hold dear, to fall into a quarry. Ashamed, Applejack and her family decide to leave. On the train ride back, Granny Smith informs Applejack that Holder's Boulder is a centerpiece of the farm and part of their traditions. Applejack returns to the farm with her family to apologize to the Pies for forcing her traditions onto them and helps them push Holder's Boulder back to its proper place. The two families reconcile their differences and continue to enjoy the holiday.
112	21	"Scare Master"	Denny Lu	Natasha Levinger	October 31, 2015	521	0.40
Fluttershy is forced to go out on Nightmare Night to buy food for Angel instead of shutting herself in her cottage as usual. She decides to use this as an opportunity to join her friends in the festivities, putting together a horror attraction to avoid letting her overly fearful nature ruin the fun for them. Her first attempt falls short of their expectations, but with the help of her animal friends, she adds a terrifying section to the Apple family corn maze to surprise her friends. Fluttershy's plan succeeds too well, causing her friends to believe they are actually in danger. Although the others are impressed when they realize the truth, Fluttershy realizes she is uncomfortable with scaring others and decides to stop forcing herself to do what she dislikes.
113	22	"What About Discord?"	Denny Lu	Neal Dusedau	November 7, 2015	522	N/A
Twilight returns from a three-day break of reorganizing her library alone with Spike, only to find that her friends have spent a memorable and hilarious bonding activity with Discord. Refusing to admit her jealousy at being left out, Twilight focuses on understanding how her friends could become so close to Discord by trying to recreate their weekend as an "experiment". When this fails, Twilight convinces herself that Discord has put her friends under a spell, but the potion she forces them to drink in order to prove it has no effect. Finally snapping, Twilight admits to her friends that as the Princess of Friendship, she believes she has no right to feel jealous. Her friends then apologize to her for making her feel left out and playfully ignore Discord after he reveals he intentionally convinced them to leave her out in order to teach her this lesson.
114	23	"The Hooffields and McColts"	Denny Lu	Joanna Lewis & Kristine Songco	November 14, 2015	523	0.48
When the map sends Twilight and Fluttershy on a friendship mission to a valley within the Smokey Mountains, they meet two neighboring families, known as the Hooffields and the McColts, who both have a long-standing feud. With the valley in shambles from the feud, Twilight believes this is a simple friendship problem and tries to get both sides to discuss the matter. However, the feud has gone on for so long, neither side remembers how it started and their misunderstandings of Twilight's plan only makes the fighting worse. Fluttershy learns that the animals in the area have no food or shelter due to the feud, which started over a petty argument between the two families' ancestors over a nature preserve. Realizing their fighting is pointless, the two families make peace and help to restore the valley's wildlife together.
115	24	"The Mane Attraction"	Denny Lu	Amy Keating Rogers	November 21, 2015	524	0.29
While Applejack organizes a music festival at Sweet Apple Acres, Pinkie Pie tells everypony that she booked Countess Coloratura, Equestria's most famous pop singer, to perform at the festival. Applejack believes Countess Coloratura is her childhood friend who she nicknamed "Rara", but when Coloratura arrives, Applejack is confused to see that she appears to be an overly demanding diva, unlike the humble pony she knew. Applejack discovers that Coloratura is still the same, charitable pony as always and that her demands come from her manager Svengallop, who uses her fame for his benefit. After Applejack and her friends expose Svengallop's greed to Coloratura, he leaves her to manage the performance on her own. Encouraged by Applejack, Coloratura sings a passionate ballad where she embraces her true self, amazing her fans.
116	25	"The Cutie Re-Mark" (Parts 1 & 2)	Denny Lu	Josh Haber	November 28, 2015	525	0.30
117	26	"The Cutie Re-Mark" (Parts 1 & 2)	Denny Lu	Josh Haber	November 28, 2015	526	0.33
Part 1: After giving a lecture about cutie marks at the School for Gifted Unicorns, Twilight and Spike return home and encounter Starlight Glimmer, who has returned to exact revenge against Twilight for ruining her utopian society. Using Star Swirl the Bearded's time travel spell, Starlight travels back in time to stop Rainbow Dash from performing her first Sonic Rainboom, which allowed Twilight and her friends to obtain their cutie marks at the same time, and prevent them from coming together in the future. Twilight and Spike follow after her but fail to stop her from sabotaging the race. They return to an alternate present where Equestria is at war with King Sombra, but the map remains and grants them access to reuse Star Swirl's spell to take them back to the past and stop Starlight. Their second attempt lands them in another alternate present ruled by Queen Chrysalis. Part 2: Twilight and Spike are now trapped in a time loop as they repeatedly fail to stop Starlight from altering the past, which creates numerous alternate versions of Equestria dominated by its enemies. Knowing they cannot stop her, they forcibly take Starlight with them to a wasteland to show how her actions are ravaging the present. Starlight refuses to believe them and shows them her own childhood, revealing that she lost touch with her friend Sunburst after he earned his cutie mark and left to study magic in Canterlot, which lead her to believe that cutie marks ruin friendships. As she attempts to stop the Rainboom again to prove her point, Twilight convinces her to give friendship another chance and they return to the unaltered present together. After deliberating with her friends, Twilight decides to take Starlight on as her student and her friends accept her as a friend as well.

== DVD release ==
My Little Pony: Friendship Is Magic: Season Five
Set details	Special features
26 episodes; 4-disc set; 16:9 aspect ratio; Subtitles: English	2015 San Diego Comic-Con Panel; Sing-Alongs ("In Our Town", "I'll Fly", "We'll Make Our Mark", and "Friends Are Always There for You")
Release dates
Region 1
July 12, 2016
