= The Cutie Re-Mark =

- My Little Pony: Friendship Is Magic episodes
- Episode nos.: Season 5 Episodes 25 and 26
- Directed by: Denny Lu; Jayson Thiessen (consulting)
- Written by: Josh Haber
- Original air date: November 28, 2015
- Running time: 44 minutes (combined)

Episode chronology
← Previous "The Mane Attraction"	Next → "The Crystalling" "My Little Pony: Equestria Girls - Friendship Games"
- My Little Pony: Friendship Is Magic (season 5)

"The Cutie Re-Mark" is the collective name for the twenty-fifth and twenty-sixth episodes of the fifth season of the animated television series My Little Pony: Friendship Is Magic as well as the 116th and 117th episodes of the series overall. Written by Josh Haber and directed by Denny Lu, the two episodes center around Starlight Glimmer, who tries to take revenge on the Mane Six by going back in time and preventing them from ever meeting each other. Released on November 28, 2015, the plot of the episode received mixed reviews from critics.

== Plot ==
At the School for Gifted Unicorns, Twilight Sparkle gives a lecture about cutie marks and tells how she and her friends got their cutie marks. Twilight gets nervous after briefly seeing Starlight Glimmer in the audience, who disappears immediately. After finishing the lecture, Twilight, together with Spike who was accompanying her during the school visit, returns to the Castle of Friendship. In the throne room, they find Starlight, who has returned to seek for revenge after Twilight and her friends ruined her "utopian" society.

Using Star Swirl the Bearded's time travel spell, Starlight travels back in time with a portal to the point Rainbow Dash performed her first Sonic Rainboom in Cloudsdale, which allowed Twilight and her friends to obtain their cutie marks at the same time. Twilight and Spike follow her, but are unable to prevent Starlight from using her magic to stop Rainbow Dash. The portal re-opens and the trio are back to the present again, where they find Ponyville desolate and near deserted.

At Sweet Apple Acres, which is now a heavily industrialized apple-processing plant, Twilight and Spike encounter Applejack, who doesn't remember either of them. She explains that King Sombra returned and forced all Crystal ponies into his army in a war against Equestria, with the rest of the Mane Six being a part of Princess Celestia's army. Hearing this, Twilight reuses the spell to take them back to the past again. However, Starlight altered the spell to arrive earlier than Twilight and proceeds to talk with the bullies of filly Fluttershy, making them befriend each other.

With Fluttershy no longer being bullied, Rainbow Dash does not have to perform the Sonic Rainboom and refuses after Twilight asks her to do so. The portal takes them to the present for a second time, where Ponyville is covered with dense trees. The duo land in another alternate present, where they encounter several ponies, including Fluttershy and Pinkie Pie with spears, accusing them of being disguised Changelings and try to destroy them.

Twilight and Spike insist that they are not Changelings. A potion brewed by Zecora shows they come from a different reality, calming everyone down. Zecora takes them to a forest camp where they are hiding and explains that Queen Chrysalis took over Equestria after her attack on Canterlot was successful. Upon hearing this, Twilight explains the whole situation with Starlight. Suddenly, Chrysalis and her Changeling army attack the camp. Twilight and Spike immediately go back to the Cutie Map and return to the past, where Starlight is waiting for them.

Now back in Cloudsdale, Twilight fights with Starlight in a magic battle, attracting the attention of Rainbow Dash and the bullies, preventing the Sonic Rainboom from happening again. The portal pulls Twilight and Spike to the future for a third time. They land in a forest during nighttime, where they are chased to the Castle of the Two Sisters by timberwolves. In the castle, the duo meet Nightmare Moon, the evil alter-ego of Princess Luna, who returned after a thousand years of imprisonment, banishing Celestia to the moon and started ruling Equestria in eternal night, also having Rarity and Rainbow Dash working for her.

After hearing of their experience with time travel, Nightmare Moon demands to know how they did it, taking Spike hostage. Twilight takes her to the Cutie Map, unexpectedly frees Spike, and returns to the past. Twilight and Spike repeatedly fail to stop Starlight from altering the past and are now trapped in a time loop, creating alternate versions of Equestria ruled by Lord Tirek, Discord and Flim and Flam.

Twilight and Spike then forcibly take Starlight through the portal with them so she can see the consequences of her actions. This time, they arrive in a deserted wasteland. Starlight refuses to believe them and shows them her own childhood, revealing that she lost touch with her friend Sunburst after he earned his cutie mark and left to study magic in Canterlot. This led her to believe that cutie marks ruin friendships. Back in Cloudsdale in the past, Starlight, desperate to prove her point, threatens to rip the time scroll in half, but Twilight convinces her to give friendship another chance, and all three return to the unaltered present together. After consulting with her friends, Twilight takes Starlight on as her student, and her friends accept her as a friend as well.

== Production ==
A two-minute animatic was shown at the 2015 San Diego Comic-Con. In both episodes, each featured character was designed by Kora Kosicka and Fernanda Ribeiro. The season finale was the final time Jayson Thiessen was involved with the show as his attention completely shifted to directing the 2017 theatrical movie based on the series. The only song featured in the episodes is "Friends Are Always There For You", which is sung by Starlight Glimmer and the Mane Six in the second part. The song was composed by Daniel Ingram, with the mandolin part being made by Caleb Chan.

== Broadcast and reception ==
The two episodes aired back-to-back on Discovery Family on November 28, 2015. According to the Nielsen household ratings, the season 5 finale viewed by approximately 0.06 percent of all 18- to 49-year-olds watching television at the time of broadcast and had a total of 325.000 viewers.

Daniel Alvarez from Unleash the Fanboy gave the episode 8 out of 10 stars. Alvarez said that the show has reputation of reforming antagonists, which is "often labeled negatively." He added that the redemption part of the story has been done well, but this was "at the expense of Starlight Glimmer’s role as a villain", whom he labelled as "one of the show’s finest antagonists." Screen Rant ranked "The Cutie Re-Mark" the seventh-best season finale according to IMDb, with Part 1 and Part 2 getting a rating of 8.3 and 8.2 out of 10 respectively.

== Home media ==
The two part season finale is part of the "Exploring the Crystal Empire" Region 1 DVD by Shout! Factory which was made available in stores on February 7, 2017. It was also available complete Season 5 DVD Set released on July 12, 2016.
