= Do Princesses Dream of Magic Sheep? =

- My Little Pony: Friendship Is Magic episode
- The Tantabus prepares to escape the dream world.
- Episode no.: Season 5 Episode 13
- Directed by: Jim Miller
- Written by: Scott Sonneborn
- Story by: Jayson Thiessen; Jim Miller
- Original air date: July 11, 2015
- Running time: 22 minutes

Episode chronology
← Previous "Amending Fences"	Next → "Canterlot Boutique"
- My Little Pony: Friendship Is Magic season 5

"Do Princesses Dream of Magic Sheep?" is the thirteenth episode of the fifth season of the animated television series My Little Pony: Friendship Is Magic. The episode's story was written by Jayson Thiessen and Jim Miller (the latter of whom directed the episode) while Scott Sonneborn wrote the teleplay. It originally aired on Discovery Family on July 11, 2015. In this episode, Princess Luna confronts a nightmare creature called the Tantabus that she created to punish herself for her past as Nightmare Moon, and must learn to forgive herself to prevent it from escaping into the waking world.

The title of the episode is a reference to the Philip K. Dick's science fiction novel Do Androids Dream of Electric Sheep?

== Plot ==
The Mane Six discover they all experienced nightmares featuring the same blue smoke creature, which prompts Twilight Sparkle to contact Princess Luna for answers. Luna reveals that the creature is called the Tantabus, a parasitic nightmare entity that feeds on dreams and grows stronger with each infection, threatening to escape into the real world and transform all of Equestria into a living nightmare. The Tantabus originally invaded their dreams after escaping from Luna's own nightmares when she dreamed about them, and Luna enters their dreams each night to pursue the creature as it torments each pony with personalized horrors.

When Pinkie Pie's dream about all of Ponyville exposes the entire town to the Tantabus, Luna creates a massive shared dream to contain the creature in one location, though this strains her magical abilities. The ponies of Ponyville unite against the Tantabus using dream logic to transform themselves into powerful forms: Fluttershy becomes Flutterbat, Big McIntosh turns into an alicorn, and others become superheroes to fight the growing threat. However, Luna's overwhelming guilt continues to strengthen the Tantabus until she tearfully admits that she created it herself as self-punishment for her past actions as Nightmare Moon. With Twilight's help, Luna finally forgives herself and recognizes that her efforts to stop the Tantabus prove she has changed, allowing her to reabsorb the creature and experience her first peaceful sleep in years.

== Broadcast and reception ==
=== Ratings ===
According to the Nielsen household ratings, the episode was watched by approximately 0.25 percent of American households and had 418,000 viewers.

=== Awards ===
The episode won the 2016 Leo Award for "Best Overall Sound in an Animation Program or Series" for Marcel Duperreault, Todd Araki, Jason Fredrickson, Kirk Furniss, Adam McGhie, Christine Church, and Roger Monk.

=== Critical reception ===
Sherilyn Connelly, the author of Ponyville Confidential, gave the episode a "B+" rating. Tyler B. Searle of Collider ranked the episode as the darkest episode in kids' cartoons. He wrote that while the show as primarily written for young children, it touched on deeper topics occasionally, with the episode "explor[ing] themes of the dangers of holding onto guilt, and how the first step to acceptance is letting others in." Daniel Alvarez of Unleash The Fanboy gave the episode a rating of 8 out of 10 and called it entertaining, but criticized it as feeling "too rushed" and like two episodes crammed into one. He praised the fan-driven scenes and described the episode's message about forgiving yourself as arguably one of the show's finest.

A BronyCon panel coverage by The Washington Post described how an attendee named Jones was deeply moved by "Do Princesses Dream of Magic Sheep?" and needed a moment to compose himself after showing a clip to the audience. Jones explained that the episode, in which Luna learns to forgive herself for creating the Tantabus to punish herself for past harm, crystallized everything he needed to realize about getting sober and pulled him back from the brink of suicide.

In a critical analysis of the episode, author Jen A. Blue explored Luna's struggle with guilt and self-punishment and wrote that the Tantabus represents Luna's own Shadow and that "self-imposed penance in particular is an example of denying one's own Shadow." Blue analyzed the difference between penance and making amends, writing that penance aims to increase suffering while making amends seeks to heal harm, and argued that Luna's self-punishment only strengthens her guilt and makes the Tantabus more powerful. Blue interpreted the episode as a classic confrontation with the Shadow, writing that "the only thing that can prevent her from becoming Nightmare Moon again is her own choice not to" and that redemption requires accepting one's capacity for wrongdoing rather than rejecting it. Blue concluded that the episode demonstrates how guilt serves as a moral alarm, but wallowing in guilt is counterproductive, and that true peace comes from accepting guilt and using it for growth rather than self-punishment.

== In popular culture ==
In July 2016, the episode gained attention when Republican National Committee communications director Sean Spicer quoted Twilight Sparkle's line "This is your dream, anything you can do in your dreams you can do now" during a CNN interview to defend Melania Trump against accusations that her Republican National Convention speech had plagiarized portions of Michelle Obama's 2008 Democratic National Convention speech. Spicer used the quote to argue that similar phrases appear across many sources, stating that he could "come up with a list in five minutes" of comparable statements and rhetorically asking whether Obama had plagiarized the My Little Pony character. Ultimately, no disciplinary action was taken by Donald Trump's campaign as a result of the controversy.

== See also ==
- List of My Little Pony: Friendship Is Magic episodes
