= The Hooffields and McColts =

- My Little Pony: Friendship Is Magic episode
- Episode no.: Season 5 Episode 23
- Written by: Joanna Lewis & Kristine Songco
- Story by: Denny Lu
- Original air date: November 14, 2015
- Running time: 22 minutes

Episode chronology
| ← Previous "What About Discord?" | Next → "The Mane Attraction" |
- My Little Pony: Friendship Is Magic season 5

"The Hooffields and McColts" is the twenty-third episode of the fifth season of the animated television series My Little Pony: Friendship Is Magic. The episode was written by Joanna Lewis and Kristine Songco from a story by Denny Lu. It originally aired on Discovery Family on November 14, 2015. In this episode, Twilight Sparkle and Fluttershy are sent by the Cutie Map to resolve a long-standing feud between two neighboring families, the Hooffields and McColts.

The title of the episode is a reference to the real-life feud between the Hatfield and McCoy families.

== Plot ==
The Cutie Map summons Twilight Sparkle and Fluttershy to the Smokey Mountains, where they discover two feuding families locked in constant warfare that has devastated what was once a beautiful valley. The rural Hooffields and the architectural McColts fire produce and building materials at each other from opposing mountaintops, which endangers the local wildlife caught between their conflict. Despite Twilight's diplomatic efforts to negotiate a truce, both sides remain stubbornly committed to winning their fight while having completely forgotten the original reason for their hostility.

When Twilight's various peace proposals fail spectacularly—like a cake that turns out to be a Trojan horse filled with Hooffields—Fluttershy speaks with the displaced animals to learn the true history of the conflict. She discovers that the family patriarchs Grub Hooffield and Piles McColt were originally best friends who discovered the pristine valley and vowed to protect it together, but disagreed on whether to start with farming or building shelter for the animals. Their disagreement escalated into sabotage and eventually split them onto opposing mountains, and their descendants inherited a meaningless war that destroyed the very valley their ancestors sought to preserve. Once both families understand how their feud has betrayed their founders' noble intentions, they apologize to each other and the animals, and they work together to restore the valley and build a fountain honoring their ancestors.

== Broadcast and reception ==
=== Ratings ===
According to the Nielsen household ratings, the episode was watched by approximately 0.14 percent of American households and had 483,000 viewers.

=== Awards ===
Peter Kelamis was nominated for a 2016 UBCP/ACTRA award for Best Voice for his role as Big Daddy McColt but lost to Lee Tockar for his work in Slugterra.

=== Critical reception ===
Sherilyn Connelly, the author of Ponyville Confidential, gave the episode a "C-" rating and described the episode as having an unusually heavy emphasis on cutie marks. Daniel Alvarez of Unleash The Fanboy gave the episode a rating of 5 out of 10 and called it "a disappointment," criticizing Twilight as being written "very off" with superficial happiness and describing the plot as really bad with poor dialogue. He praised Fluttershy's performance as "perhaps her best appearance in the season yet" but found the overall story groan-worthy and mindless.

In a collection of essays on father figures in cartoon television, Samuel Oatley wrote about "The Hooffields and McColts" as an example of what he termed "Symbiotic Father" relationships. He analyzed how Ma Hooffield and Big Daddy McColt form a non-romantic partnership that focuses entirely on caregiving roles. Oatley argued that their feud originated from "a disagreement between their two settler forefathers over how to manage their valley home as a wildlife preserve" and that their reconciliation is framed as restoring balance for the animals, treating them "like they are surrogate children who need care from the agrarian Ma and architect Big Daddy." He noted that the writers deliberately chose to give the contrasting characters different genders and make their primary character arcs focus on their roles as caregivers, which suggests that symbiotic relationships must be enforced even between characters who do not enter romantic relationships with one another.

== See also ==
- List of My Little Pony: Friendship Is Magic episodes
