= Castle Sweet Castle =

- My Little Pony: Friendship Is Magic episode
- Twilight Sparkle (left) and Spike (right) visit the remains of the Golden Oak Library, which was destroyed in the climactic battle in the episode "Twilight's Kingdom".
- Episode no.: Season 5 Episode 3
- Directed by: Jim Miller
- Written by: Joanna Lewis & Kristine Songco
- Original air date: April 11, 2015
- Running time: 22 minutes

Episode chronology
← Previous "The Cutie Map"	Next → "Bloom & Gloom"
- My Little Pony: Friendship Is Magic season 5

"Castle Sweet Castle" is the third episode of the fifth season of the animated television series My Little Pony: Friendship Is Magic. The episode was written by Joanna Lewis and Kristine Songco and directed by Jim Miller. It originally aired on Discovery Family on April 11, 2015. In this episode, Twilight Sparkle's friends discover she has been avoiding her new castle because it doesn't feel like home, so they work together to help her create new memories.

== Plot ==
Twilight's friends notice she has been avoiding her new castle and spending excessive time helping them with unnecessary tasks, from over-cleaning Fluttershy's animals to repeatedly racing Rainbow Dash. When confronted during a pancake breakfast, Twilight admits the castle feels too big, cold, and empty to be a real home compared to her beloved Golden Oak Library. Her friends decide to redecorate the castle while she enjoys a relaxing day at the Ponyville Day Spa, with Spike tasked to keep her away until they finish.

Each friend decorates according to their own tastes, resulting in a cluttered mishmash that transforms the throne room into chaos: Applejack adds hay bales and apple crates, Fluttershy brings various animals, Pinkie Pie installs hidden party cannons, Rainbow Dash hangs Wonderbolts memorabilia, and Rarity adds gemstone curtains and banners. Realizing their mistake, they strip away all the decorations and instead create a chandelier from the roots of the destroyed Golden Oak Library, adorned with gems depicting Twilight's cherished memories from her time in Ponyville. This moves Twilight to tears and helps her understand that home isn't about appearance but about the memories made there, finally making her ready to create new memories in her castle.

== Broadcast and reception ==
=== Ratings ===
According to the Nielsen household ratings, the episode was watched by approximately 0.2 percent of American households and had 418,000 viewers.

=== Critical reception ===
Sherilyn Connelly, the author of Ponyville Confidential, gave the episode a "C+" rating. Daniel Alvarez of Unleash The Fanboy gave the episode a rating of 8.5 out of 10 and called it "very good" and "a great watch," praising the heartwarming ending and describing the climax as "truly special." He noted that the episode successfully explores Twilight's transition from her library to the castle for the first time and praised the catchy song "Make This Castle A Home," though he criticized minor elements like Pinkie Pie having an "off moment" with the spoon scene.

== See also ==
- List of My Little Pony: Friendship Is Magic episodes
