= Made in Manehattan =

- My Little Pony: Friendship Is Magic episode
- Episode no.: Season 5 Episode 16
- Written by: Noelle Benvenuti
- Story by: Denny Lu
- Original air date: September 26, 2015
- Running time: 22 minutes

Episode chronology
← Previous "Rarity Investigates!"	Next → "Brotherhooves Social"
- My Little Pony: Friendship Is Magic season 5

"Made in Manehattan" is the sixteenth episode of the fifth season of the animated television series My Little Pony: Friendship Is Magic. The episode was written by Noelle Benvenuti from a story by Denny Lu. It originally aired on Discovery Family on September 26, 2015. In this episode, Applejack and Rarity are sent by the Cutie Map to Manehattan to help their friend Coco Pommel revive her neighborhood's community theater.

== Plot ==
The Cutie Map summons Applejack and Rarity to Manehattan, where they reunite with Coco Pommel and discover that she is struggling to organize the Midsummer Theatre Revival, a community tradition that died out when its original founder Charity Kindheart moved away. Coco faces overwhelming challenges like a dilapidated park venue, no volunteers willing to help, and the impending arrival of the Method Mares theater troupe for a dress rehearsal. The three fail to recruit community support and can only restore the neglected park to mediocre condition and the stage collapses completely when the performers arrive for their rehearsal.

Feeling defeated and questioning why the map chose them over more qualified ponies like Twilight, Applejack suggests scaling down their ambitions and focusing on what they can accomplish rather than what they cannot. They organize a modest performance in the neighborhood square, where the Method Mares present a play dedicated to Charity Kindheart that gradually attracts passersby and rekindles the community spirit that had been lost. This proves far more successful than the grand revival would have been and inspires neighborhood ponies to volunteer for future restoration projects. Rarity remarks that even small contributions can create a big difference.

== Reception ==
Sherilyn Connelly, the author of Ponyville Confidential, gave the episode a "B" rating and described the episode as having an unusually heavy emphasis on cutie marks. Daniel Alvarez of Unleash The Fanboy gave the episode a rating of 8 out of 10 and called it "for sure solid," praising the return of Coco Pommel and the episode's message about making a difference through small actions. He criticized some strange dialogue for Applejack and wrote that her failure to adapt to city life did not make sense since she had been to Manehattan before. Kieran Hair, writing in WhatCulture, criticized the episode's moral lesson and wrote that while the episode tries to teach that small acts can make a real impact, it contradictively uses Applejack building an entire stage by herself as an example of a "small act." Hair wrote that if ponies in Manehattan need to witness "an amazing feat of last-minute carpentry" before being inspired to pull weeds or plant flowers, the park's maintenance prospects are poor.

== See also ==
- List of My Little Pony: Friendship Is Magic episodes
