= Tanks for the Memories =

- My Little Pony: Friendship Is Magic episode
- Rainbow Dash gets the idea to prevent winter from happening.
- Episode no.: Season 5 Episode 5
- Directed by: Jim Miller
- Written by: Cindy Morrow
- Original air date: April 25, 2015
- Running time: 22 minutes

Episode chronology
← Previous "Bloom & Gloom"	Next → "Appleoosa's Most Wanted"
- My Little Pony: Friendship Is Magic season 5

"Tanks for the Memories" is the fifth episode of the fifth season of the animated television series My Little Pony: Friendship Is Magic. The episode was written by Cindy Morrow and directed by Jim Miller. It originally aired on Discovery Family on April 25, 2015. In this episode, Rainbow Dash learns that her pet tortoise Tank must hibernate for the winter and desperately attempts to prevent winter from coming.

The title of the episode is a reference to the Bob Hope song "Thanks for the Memory".

== Plot ==
As Cloudsdale settles over Ponyville to begin the winter season, Rainbow Dash excitedly anticipates her first winter with her pet tortoise Tank, but notices he can barely stay awake despite appearing perfectly healthy. When Fluttershy examines Tank and explains that tortoises naturally hibernate during winter, Rainbow Dash refuses to accept this diagnosis and seeks second opinions from Spike and others, and grows increasingly angry and stubborn as everyone confirms this. Rainbow decides that if Tank only hibernates because of winter, she simply needs to prevent winter from arriving in Ponyville altogether.

Rainbow embarks on a campaign to stop winter: she clears snow clouds from the sky, prevents migrating birds from flying south, puts fallen leaves back on trees, and ultimately infiltrates the Cloudsdale weather factory to sabotage snow production. Her plan backfires spectacularly when Tank accidentally damages the laboratory equipment, causing the entire facility to malfunction and create chaotic weather that sends a massive snowball crashing into Ponyville, bringing winter instantly and making Tank even sleepier than before. Rainbow breaks down in tears with her friends' support and learns to accept that some things cannot be changed. She says a tearful goodbye to Tank as he settles into his winter burrow for hibernation.

== Broadcast and reception ==
=== Ratings ===
According to the Nielsen household ratings, the episode was watched by approximately 0.3 percent of American households and had 647,000 viewers.

=== Critical reception ===
Sherilyn Connelly, the author of Ponyville Confidential, gave the episode an "A-" rating and wrote that the episode "[went] to some emotional places." Liza Arustamian of Startefacts included the episode among the top five episodes that prove My Little Pony is perfect for adults, describing Rainbow Dash's desperate attempt to prevent winter as "a profound meditation on loss and acceptance." Arustamian wrote that the episode "doesn't shy away from depicting the raw stages of grief" and argued that adults recognize "the universal struggle of watching loved ones slip away and the futile desire to stop time itself." Daniel Alvarez of Unleash The Fanboy gave the episode a rating of 7 out of 10 and called it "an emotional episode with a rather annoying Rainbow Dash," criticizing her for being "comically unreasonable" and noting that her plot to stop winter was "comically extreme and beyond selfish." He praised the heartwarming story aspects and Rainbow Dash's solo song "I'll Fly" but felt her character showed "how little development she's had over the course of five seasons."

In an essay analyzing the use of metatextuality in Friendship Is Magic, Aaron Kashtan examined "Tanks for the Memories" as an example of the show's cross-media references, noting that when Rainbow Dash gets the idea to prevent winter from happening, "she grins evilly, and her facial expression is identical to that of Dr. Seuss's Grinch." Kashtan also highlighted Twilight Sparkle's comment "Prepare yourselves, everypony! Winter is coming!" as a reference to Game of Thrones and wrote that such references function as examples of Barbara Wall's concept of double address, where children's texts simultaneously address adult audiences.

== See also ==
- List of My Little Pony: Friendship Is Magic episodes
