= My Little Pony: Pony Life =

American-Irish children's animated television series

- Also known as: Pony Life
- Based on: My Little Pony: Friendship Is Magic by Lauren Faust; My Little Pony by Bonnie Zacherle
- Developed by: Whitney Ralls; Katie Chilson
- Directed by: Adrian Ignat
- Voices of: Tara Strong; Ashleigh Ball; Andrea Libman; Tabitha St. Germain
- Theme music composer: Jess Furman; Ethan Roberts
- Opening theme: "Pony Life" performed by Lauren Dyson
- Ending theme: "Pony Life" (instrumental)
- Composer: Jess Furman
- Countries of origin: United States; Ireland
- Original language: English
- No. of seasons: 2
- No. of episodes: 40 (list of episodes)

Production
- Executive producers: Stephen Davis; Olivier Dumont
- Producer: Peter Lewis
- Running time: 11 minutes (Note: Each episode includes two segments, which are about 5-6 minutes each. The series though originally aired as a half-hour program, meaning four segments in each episode.)
- Production companies: Entertainment One; Hasbro Entertainment

Original release
- Network: Discovery Family
- Release: November 7, 2020 – May 22, 2021

My Little Pony: Pony Life is an animated television series that aired on Treehouse TV in Canada from June 21, 2020, to April 25, 2021, and on Discovery Family in the United States from November 7, 2020, to May 22, 2021. It is based on Hasbro's My Little Pony franchise and is the fourth animated series in the franchise overall. Pony Life is a standalone spin-off to My Little Pony: Friendship Is Magic (2010–2019), featuring a new caricatured art style, slice-of-life stories, and some returning writers and voice cast from Friendship is Magic.

The series was produced by Entertainment One, with animation provided by Boulder Media. Unlike Friendship Is Magic, each episode is 11 minutes long, consisting of two five-minute segments.

== Premise ==
The main setting of Pony Life is Sugarcube Corner, a bakery operated by Pinkie Pie that she and her friends Applejack, Rainbow Dash, Twilight Sparkle, Rarity, and Fluttershy often use as a hangout. The series explores comedic, slice-of-life stories that they experience, primarily while hanging out at Sugarcube Corner. As a reboot, it has no continuity with Friendship Is Magic, allowing for the existence of new characters (such as Potion Nova and Octavio Pie, Pinkie Pie's brother) and the omission of certain other characters from the original series.

== Voice cast ==
=== Main cast ===
With the exception of Cathy Weseluck, who voiced Spike, the main voice actors from My Little Pony: Friendship Is Magic reprise their roles in Pony Life.

- Tara Strong as Twilight Sparkle
- Ashleigh Ball as Applejack and Rainbow Dash
- Andrea Libman as Fluttershy and Pinkie Pie (Note: Shannon Chan-Kent was the primary singing voice of Pinkie Pie in Friendship Is Magic with Libman occasionally providing her singing voice.)
- Tabitha St. Germain as Rarity (Note: Kazumi Evans was the original singing voice of Rarity in Friendship Is Magic.) and Spike (Note: Tabitha St. Germain voices Spike in Pony Life since Cathy Weseluck chose not to reprise the role.)

=== Supporting cast ===
- Nicole Oliver as Princess Celestia and Cheerilee
- Kyle Rideout as Dishwater Slog
- Andrew McNee as Bubbles Cherub McSquee
- Andrea Libman as Buttershy and Matt 2
- Daniel Doheny as Derek and Matt 1
- Tabitha St. Germain as Smallfry, Karen and Muffins
- Trevor Devall as Fancy Pants
- Madeleine Peters as Scootaloo
- Michelle Creber as Apple Bloom
- Claire Corlett as Sweetie Belle
- Peter New as Discord (Note: John de Lancie was the original voice of Discord in Friendship Is Magic.) and Big McIntosh
- Kathleen Barr as Trixie Lulamoon
- Ryan Beil as Finn Tastic
- Chanelle Peloso as Potion Nova
- Lili Beaudoin as Minty
- Jesse Inocalla as Octavio Pie
- Richard Ian Cox as Snails
- Ian Hanlin as Snips (Note: Lee Tockar was the original voice of Snips in Friendship Is Magic.)
- Michael Dobson as Bulk Biceps
- Luc Roderique as Herd Happily and Curtain Call
- Peter Kelamis as Saddle Bags
- Laara Sadiq as Natalie
- Rebecca Shoichet as Twilight Sparkle (singing voice) and Pulverizer
- Britt McKillip as Princess Cadance
- Bethany Brown as Lightning Chill
- Connor Parnall as Echo
- Ana Sani as Sugar Snap
- Samuel Vincent as Flim
- Scott McNeil as Flam
- Andrew Francis as Shining Armor
- Tina Grant as Chamomilia

== Episodes ==
| Season | Episodes | Originally released | |
| Season | Episodes | First released | Last released |
|---|---|---|---|
| 1 | 26 | November 7, 2020 | February 6, 2021 |
| 2 | 14 | April 10, 2021 | May 22, 2021 |

== Production and release ==
My Little Pony: Pony Life premiered on Discovery Family in the United States on November 7, 2020. Clips of several episodes had also been uploaded to the My Little Pony YouTube channel prior to the announcement. On September 17, 2020, it was reported that a second season was in production. The second season premiered on April 10, 2021, and concluded on May 22 of the same year.

In Ireland, the series premiered on Tiny Pop on September 1, 2020. The second season premiered on Tiny Pop ahead of the U.S. broadcast on April 2, 2021.
