= Starlight Glimmer =

Fictional character from My Little Pony

- My Little Pony character
- Starlight Glimmer as she appears in "The Crystalling Pt. 2"
- First appearance: "The Cutie Map" (2015)
- Created by: Meghan McCarthy; Scott Sonneborn; M.A. Larson; Jim Miller
- Voiced by: Kelly Sheridan

In-universe information
- Species: Unicorn; Human (Equestria Girls)
- Occupation: Village leader (formerly); Twilight Sparkle's student (seasons 6-7); Guidance counselor at the School of Friendship (seasons 8-9); Principal of the School of Friendship (finale)
- Affiliation: Trixie Lulamoon; Her village (formerly); School of Friendship; Mane Six (associate)
- Family: Firelight (father)

Starlight Glimmer is a fictional character who appears in the fourth incarnation of Hasbro's My Little Pony toyline and media franchise, beginning with My Little Pony: Friendship Is Magic (2010–2019). She first appears as the main antagonist of the fifth season before becoming a recurring character throughout the rest of the series. She is voiced by Kelly Sheridan.

A powerful and intelligent anthropomorphic unicorn with exceptional magical abilities, Starlight Glimmer is initially introduced as the leader of a cult-like village who enforces artificial equality by removing ponies' cutie marks. By the end of the fifth season, she is reformed and becomes Twilight Sparkle's protégé.

== Appearances ==
=== Fourth My Little Pony incarnation (2010–2021) ===
==== My Little Pony: Friendship Is Magic ====
Starlight first appears in the fifth season premiere "The Cutie Map" as the leader of a village where she has convinced the residents that cutie marks create inequality and unhappiness. She removes and stores cutie marks "using" a magical staff, but later she revealed that it was her own magic which could remove a pony’s cutie mark, forcing all ponies to have the same equal sign cutie mark. When Twilight and her friends arrive to investigate, Starlight attempts to convert them to her own philosophy. She is ultimately exposed and defeated when her own unaltered cutie mark is inadvertently revealed.

She returns in the season's finale "The Cutie Re-Mark", having learned time travel magic to seek revenge against Twilight. She repeatedly travels back in time to prevent Rainbow Dash's first Sonic Rainboom, creating alternate timelines where various disasters have befallen Equestria and ruled by the villains Twilight has defeated in her timeline. After experiencing these dystopian futures alongside Twilight, Starlight realizes the destructive nature of her actions and accepts Twilight's offer of friendship and guidance.

Beginning in the sixth season, Starlight becomes a student of Twilight, learning about friendship while living in the Castle of Friendship in Ponyville. (Note: "Every Little Thing She Does", "To Where and Back Again") Her backstory is revealed when she reunites with her childhood friend Sunburst, whose departure to magic school after receiving his cutie mark was the traumatic catalyst for her anti-cutie mark philosophy. (Note: "The Crystalling") She also develops a close friendship with reformed magician Trixie and bonds over their shared experience as former antagonists. (Note: "No Second Prances") In the eighth season, she becomes a guidance counselor at the School of Friendship. (Note: "Uncommon Bond", "The Parent Map") In the ninth season, she becomes the school's new head mare.

== Development ==
Starlight Glimmer is the antagonist for the Season 5 opener, and she plays a very important role going forward. She is convinced that Cutie Marks cause disharmony and that everyone having different degrees of ability makes ponies unable to be proper friends. She believes it's important that no one be more special than anyone else; she's all about everyone being equal. She has a talent for magic as well and is a proto-Twilight character. Her colors parallel Twilight Sparkle's for that reason.

— Jim Miller, My Little Pony: The Art of Equestria

According to show's storyboard artist Jim Miller, Starlight's design was chosen to parallel her role as a "proto-Twilight character". Her original name during production was "Aurora Glimmer", which was changed due to the Walt Disney Company's trademark of the name "Aurora".

== Reception and analysis ==
Writing in The Federalist, Brandon Morse analyzed Starlight Glimmer as representing "today's social-justice warrior" who uses fear and guilt to maintain control while exempting herself from the rules she imposes on others. Morse wrote that the episodes featuring Starlight Glimmer's cult-like village promoted individualism over conformity, and described her as "a controlling idealist who employs strict rules but follows none of them herself." Media scholar Ewan Kirkland wrote that Starlight's rehabilitation and reformation (like those of other villains Nightmare Moon and Discord) is a product of being shamed into "admitting error and showing remorse". Carly Olsen, writing in Screen Rant, ranked Starlight Glimmer as the eighth most powerful magic user in Friendship Is Magic. She also ranked her pairing with Trixie as the fifth best pairing in the series.

Author Sherilyn Connelly suggested that Starlight Glimmer's redemption arc was a deliberate attempt by the showrunners to recreate the successful character dynamics from the Equestria Girls films (particularly Sunset Shimmer's character arc from villain to hero). However, she observed that Starlight's story was more plot-driven compared to the character-driven approach used for other reformed villains and described the Season 5 finale as "oddly mechanical".

Within the brony fandom, Starlight Glimmer's reformation and subsequent addition to the main cast was highly controversial. In a 2016 editorial on fan news site Equestria Daily, site founder Shaun Scotellaro (also known as "Sethisto") described her as "one of the most polarizing topics" of that year, and that her increasingly prominent role had "absorbed more episodes than even some of the mane cast." Supporters argued that she filled the void left by Twilight Sparkle when she transformed into a princess in the third-season episode "Magical Mystery Cure", and that Starlight glimmer brought back the "experimental, anti-social magic lover" dynamic while adding "an element of sociopathy that really doesn't happen much in 'good' characters for kids TV." Critics, however, argued that she was redeemed too quickly after "almost destroying not only the world, but space and time," that her rapid power progression lacked proper explanation, and that she was taking screen time away from established main characters. Scotellaro further commented that "every news post involving Starlight turns into a war."

== See also ==
- Trixie Lulamoon
- Twilight Sparkle
- Sunset Shimmer
- My Little Pony: Friendship Is Magic fandom
- List of My Little Pony: Friendship Is Magic characters
