= Amending Fences =

- My Little Pony: Friendship Is Magic episode
- Twilight Sparkle (center) and her old friends Twinkleshine, Minuette, and Lemon Hearts (far right, left to right) host a party for Moon Dancer (second to left).
- Episode no.: Season 5 Episode 12
- Directed by: Jim Miller
- Written by: M.A. Larson
- Original air date: July 4, 2015
- Running time: 22 minutes

Guest appearance
- Rebecca Husain as Minuette Kazumi Evans as Moondancer

Episode chronology
← Previous "Party Pooped"	Next → "Do Princesses Dream of Magic Sheep?"
- My Little Pony: Friendship Is Magic (season 5)

"Amending Fences" is the twelfth episode of the fifth season of animated television series My Little Pony: Friendship Is Magic as well as the one hundred and third overall. Released on July 4, 2015, the episode was written by M.A. Larson and directed by Jim Miller. It received acclaim from critics and fans for its plot.

The episode focuses on Twilight Sparkle returning to Canterlot in order to visit and apologize to her old friends, who she left without saying goodbye. While most of her friends are happy to see her again, one has returned to being asocial, and Twilight has to convince her to make friends again.

== Plot ==
External videos
- Amending Fences (full episode) — Official upload of the episode onto YouTube

After a busy week of doing princess duties, Twilight Sparkle is relaxing in the Castle of Friendship, when Spike innocently reminds her of the neglectful friend she used to be before moving to Ponyville. Twilight, who now doesn't even remember the names of her old friends, decides to take a night trip to Canterlot, determined to rekindle her old friendships.

The next day, Twilight and Spike visit Minuette, who is delighted to see them. She offers to have lunch together with their other friends: Twinkleshine and Lemon Hearts. At the lunch, Twilight apologizes to the trio for leaving them behind without saying goodbye, and her friends are happy to reconnect with her. After lunch, they visit their old school, where Twilight asks about their other friend, Moon Dancer. Twilight learns that she has become a total recluse ever since Twilight skipped her first party the day before her move, and has remained furious with her.

The four friends then go to Moon Dancer's house, who greets them rudely and slams the door shut. They continue to spy on her for a few days when Minuette explains that Moon Dancer was becoming more and more social, but that they lost touch with her after the party. Moon Dancer continues to avoid Twilight and rebuff all of her efforts to help her re-embrace friendship, even after a dinner with her old friends. Twilight goes back to Ponyville overnight to get Pinkie Pie and enlists her to throw another party as an apology. The party causes Moondancer to go through an emotional breakdown. She lashes out at Twilight and expresses heartbreak and betrayal over her not coming to her party. However, realizing Twilight has invited others who already care for her, Moon Dancer is convinced to forgive Twilight and finally accept her friendship.

== Background ==
Moon Dancer was designed by illustrator Kora Kosicka.

In an interview with Equestria Daily, writer M.A. Larson said that a scene where Twilight goes to her mentor Princess Celestia to give up her role as the Princess of Friendship because of what she had done to Moon Dancer, with Celestia responding that it's never to late to repair a broken friendship, was cut due to time limitations. He also added that he "thought it was a nice scene, but you only have 22 minutes and this was an easy cut."

== Broadcast and reception ==
According to the Nielsen household ratings, the episode was watched by approximately 0.17 percent of American households and had 283.000 viewers. Fan-website Equestria Daily notes a drop of viewers, probably because it was "right on top of a major US holiday."

Daniel Alvarez of Unleash the Fanboy gave the episode a 10 out of 10, praising the voice acting of Twilight's old friends, especially Minuette. He added that "the climax is incredibly done and is what bumps up the score to perfection." Screen Rant ranked the episode fifth best according to IMDb, with a rating of 9.2 out of 10. The Entertainment Nut ranked "Amending Fences" as the best episode of Season 5, praising how M.A. Larson successfully retconned "a minor event mentioned in the very first minutes of the very first episode, and make it work out so well." Sherilyn Connelly, the author of Ponyville Confidential, gave the episode an "A+" rating and wrote that the episode "[went] to some emotional places." Liza Arustamian of Startefacts ranked "Amending Fences" among the top five episodes that prove My Little Pony is perfect for adults, writing that Twilight confronts "the consequences of neglecting friendships in pursuit of academic achievement" as she attempts to reconnect with former classmates. Arustamian wrote that the episode explores themes of regret and personal growth, with many adults seeing "their own past mistakes reflected in Twilight's journey, making her path to redemption deeply relatable."

== Home media ==
The episode is part of the "Friends Across Equestria" Region 1 DVD by Shout! Factory which was made available in stores on March 1, 2016. It was also available complete Season 5 DVD Set released on July 12, 2016.
