= Agriculture Week =

American newspaper about farming and food science

- Front page of Agriculture Week or AGWEEK, December 2009
- Categories: Agriculture magazine
- Frequency: Weekly
- Publisher: Vertical News
- Based in: Atlanta, Georgia
- Website: AGWEEK.com
- ISSN: 1938-1794

Agriculture Week, usually self-styled as AGWEEK, is a weekly agricultural and food science research magazine reporting on the latest developments in agriculture and food production. Its main topics are agribusiness, Crops, Livestock and Markets. The magazine is read primarily in the Local North Dakota area. It is published by Vertical News, an imprint of NewsRx, LLC. In 1998 Agriculture Week moved into the online market with their website, which, along with changing the magazine into a blog like format, introduced their weather, crop prediction, and policy news show, known as AgweekTV or AGWEEK TV. As of 2025 the website was long hosted by the Forum Communications Company, or the FCC for short. The TV show and website are watched throughout North America, but the Dakotas, Minnesota, Montana, and several Canadian provinces all have increased views.
