= The Cutie Map =

- My Little Pony: Friendship Is Magic episodes
- Episode nos.: Season 5 Episodes 1 and 2
- Directed by: Jayson Thiessen (supervising); Jim Miller (co-director)
- Written by: Scott Sonneborn; M.A. Larson
- Story by: Meghan McCarthy
- Editing by: M.A. Larson (story); Rachel Kenzie (animatic)
- Original air date: April 4, 2015
- Running time: 44 minutes (combined)

Episode chronology
| ← Previous "Twilight's Kingdom" "My Little Pony: Equestria Girls: Rainbow Rocks" | Next → "Castle Sweet Castle" |
- My Little Pony: Friendship Is Magic (season 5)

"The Cutie Map", also known as "Cutie Markless", is the collective name for the first and second episodes of the fifth season of the animated television series My Little Pony: Friendship Is Magic as well as the ninety-second and ninety-third episodes of the series overall. The two episodes focus on Twilight Sparkle and her friends as they visit a village controlled by Starlight Glimmer, a unicorn who strives to achieve "equality" amongst all ponies by removing their cutie marks. Both episodes were written by Scott Sonneborn and M.A. Larson from a story by Meghan McCarthy with Jayson Thiessen and Jim Miller as director and co-director, respectively.

First broadcast on Discovery Family on April 4, 2015, with both parts airing as an hour-long event, the premiere was a ratings success, becoming the series's highest-rated premiere in many demographics. The episodes received positive reviews from critics, who praised them for their messages and moral; in addition, both episodes were jointly nominated for the Hugo Award for Best Dramatic Presentation (Short Form).

== Plot ==
=== Part 1 ===
At Twilight Sparkle's new castle, she and her friends sit on their respective thrones and unwittingly activate a holographic map of Equestria, with floating images of their cutie marks (Note: A special symbol that appears on the ponies' rumps once they have discovered their purpose or special talent in life) pointing to a remote location on it. Deciding to investigate, the six friends follow the map to find a utopian village of ponies who share the same cutie mark, a black equals sign. The six become wary of the villagers' exaggerated smiles and overly welcoming nature, except for Fluttershy, who is charmed by their courtesy. The six meet the village's leader, Starlight Glimmer, who explains that all the villagers have given up their cutie marks under her philosophy that differing talents and opinions cause strife between friends. Starlight encourages the six to remain and experience the village life, expecting for the rest of Equestria to follow her example.

The six friends later argue over their purpose for coming to the village, which attracts the attention of Sugar Belle, a baker who regrets giving up her baking talent. Sugar Belle is perplexed when the six are able to set their argument aside and asks to see them in private. The six meet with her alongside two other villagers, Party Favor and Night Glider, who express eager curiosity over the six's cutie marks and friendship. Desiring to have their original marks again, the villagers inform the six of a cavern vault where their marks are stored alongside a mystical staff called the Staff of Sameness that, according to Starlight, grants her the ability to remove a pony's mark. Starlight leads the six to the vault, where the six become surrounded by the other villagers as Starlight forcibly removes their cutie marks with the staff.

=== Part 2 ===
Without their cutie marks, the six are trapped in a village prison chamber to be resocialized. Realizing they can escape by convincing Starlight they have conformed to her ways, the group sends Fluttershy to act the part. Fluttershy is successfully welcomed into the community, while Starlight punishes Party Favor to be imprisoned with the other five after he "confesses" to helping them alone, protecting Sugar Belle and Night Glider. Fluttershy later spies on Starlight to find she has sent Double Diamond to collect the six friends' cutie marks, with larger plans for Twilight's mark. She then sees Starlight accidentally splashing water over herself, washing off her own equal mark to reveal her real, unremoved mark.

When Starlight releases the five friends and Party Favor the next day, Fluttershy splashes water on Starlight to reveal her real mark to the villagers. Starlight confesses that she removed the ponies' marks with her own magic, and that the Staff of Sameness is just a piece of wood she found in the desert. The villagers revolt and reclaim their original cutie marks from the vault, while Starlight flees into the mountains with the six friends' marks. With the six hindered by their equalized abilities, Double Diamond, Party Favor, Sugar Belle, and Night Glider pursue Starlight and are able to recover the six marks using their own unique abilities. Starlight vanishes into the mountain caves while the villagers thank the six friends for helping them regain their individuality. The six later sense the map calling them through their cutie marks, determining that they have completed their work to bring friendship to the village.

== Themes ==
The main theme of the episodes is that mediocrity is harmful; Alana Joli Abbott of Den of Geek considered "The Cutie Map" "a critique of Stalinism, or at least a government like the one in [George] Orwell's Animal Farm", where the leader is the only one content with the mediocrity. She deemed the message political. Additionally, Abbott stated the show and episodes solve many of the problems in the science fiction fandom and highlighted faith, inclusion, celebrating differences, and the effect one could have as prominent themes. Her opinion of the overt messaging of the episodes was echoed by Brandon Morse of The Federalist.

== Production and promotion ==
Meghan McCarthy and M.A. Larson created the concept of Starlight Glimmer, and Kora Kosicka designed her final look. Jim Miller, co-director of the episode, considered Starlight to be a "proto-Twilight character" and, thus, her colors were similar to Twilight's. The Cutie Map was designed by art director Rebecca Dart. Directors Jayson Thiessen and Jim Miller along with Dart and prop designer Charmaine Verhagen came up with the design for the Staff of Sameness; Miller denied that it was inspired by the Spear of Longinus from the anime Neon Genesis Evangelion. The only song featured in the episodes is "In Our Town". Sung by Kelly Sheridan in the first part, the series songwriter, Daniel Ingram, was inspired by World War II propaganda music, which he studied, and struggled to find its balance between motivation and "creepy as heck". The orchestration of the song was done by Caleb Chan.

In February 2015, a trailer for the season premiere was released by Yahoo! TV Videos and was released on the next day by Hasbro. Hasbro later released a new teaser trailer on February 14. At the 2015 BABSCon, the entire two-part season five premiere was shown without commercials.

== Broadcast and reception ==
=== Ratings ===
Both parts of "The Cutie Map" aired back-to-back on Discovery Family as an hour-long event on April 4, 2015. The first part was viewed by 509,000 people and second part was viewed by 574,000 people. According to the Nielsen household ratings, both parts were watched by approximately 0.3 percent of American households. The episodes became the series' top-rated premiere among kids aged 2–11, kids aged 6–11, and girls aged 6–11. During their timeslot, Discovery Family became the second most viewed network in both broadcast and cable among girls aged 6–11.

=== Critical reception ===
Daniel Alvarez on Unleash the Fanboy gave the premiere a nine out of ten, praising the general writing of the episodes, the moral, and Princess Twilight. He also considered Starlight Glimmer a "great antagonist" but criticized Pinkie Pie for not "bring[ing] anything to the table aside from noticing a fake smile". Abbott complimented the messages of individuality, lifting oneself up, and the effect one could have.

=== Hugo Award nomination ===
In 2016, the episodes were jointly nominated for the Hugo Award for "Best Dramatic Presentation (Short Form)"; Den of Geek noted that some critics suspect that this was the result of the Rabid Puppies ballot-manipulation campaign, but emphasized that it was a worthy nomination despite speculation that the Puppies' intent had been a "joke entr[y] designed to embarrass".

== Home media ==
Under the title "Cutie Markless", the two-part season five premiere was part of the "Cutie Mark Quests" DVD which was released on June 30, 2015. It was also released as part of the complete Season 5 DVD set.
