= Mane Six =

Main characters from My Little Pony: Friendship Is Magic

- My Little Pony: Friendship Is Magic organization
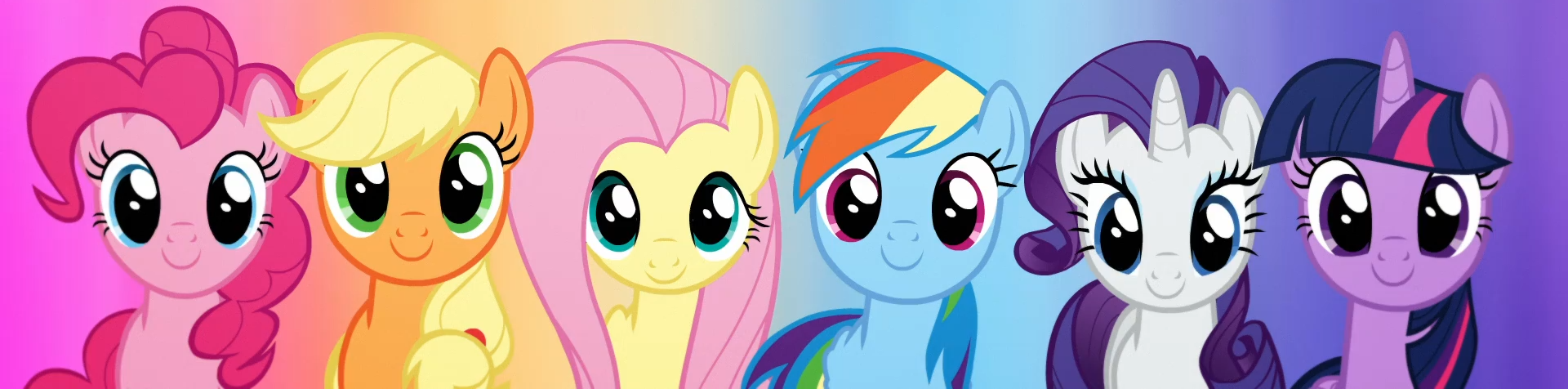
- The Mane Six; From left: Pinkie Pie, Applejack, Fluttershy, Rainbow Dash, Rarity, and Twilight Sparkle
- First appearance: "Friendship Is Magic" (2010)
- Created by: Lauren Faust
- Location: Ponyville
- Leader: Twilight Sparkle
- Key people: Applejack; Rainbow Dash; Pinkie Pie; Rarity; Fluttershy
- Affiliations: Spike; Discord; Sunset Shimmer; Starlight Glimmer; Princess Celestia; Princess Luna; Princess Cadence; Shining Armor; Zecora; The Great and Powerful Trixie; Cutie Mark Crusaders; The Wonderbolts
- Enemies: Discord (formerly); Sunset Shimmer (formerly); Starlight Glimmer (formerly); The Great and Powerful Trixie (formerly); Lord Tirek; Queen Chrysalis; Cozy Glow; King Sombra

The Mane Six (Note: Bronyspeak for main as in main characters) are the main characters of the animated television series My Little Pony: Friendship Is Magic. The group consists of six pony friends: Twilight Sparkle, Applejack, Rainbow Dash, Pinkie Pie, Rarity, and Fluttershy. Created by Lauren Faust, each of the Mane Six represents a different element of the Elements of Harmony, a set of six magical artifacts used to defend Equestria against powerful threats.

Each of the Mane Six was designed to represent a specific element: honesty (Applejack), kindness (Fluttershy), laughter (Pinkie Pie), generosity (Rarity), loyalty (Rainbow Dash), and magic (Twilight Sparkle). The Mane Six have been well-received by television critics and are cited as one of the main reasons the series attracted an older fanbase known as bronies.

== Creation and development ==
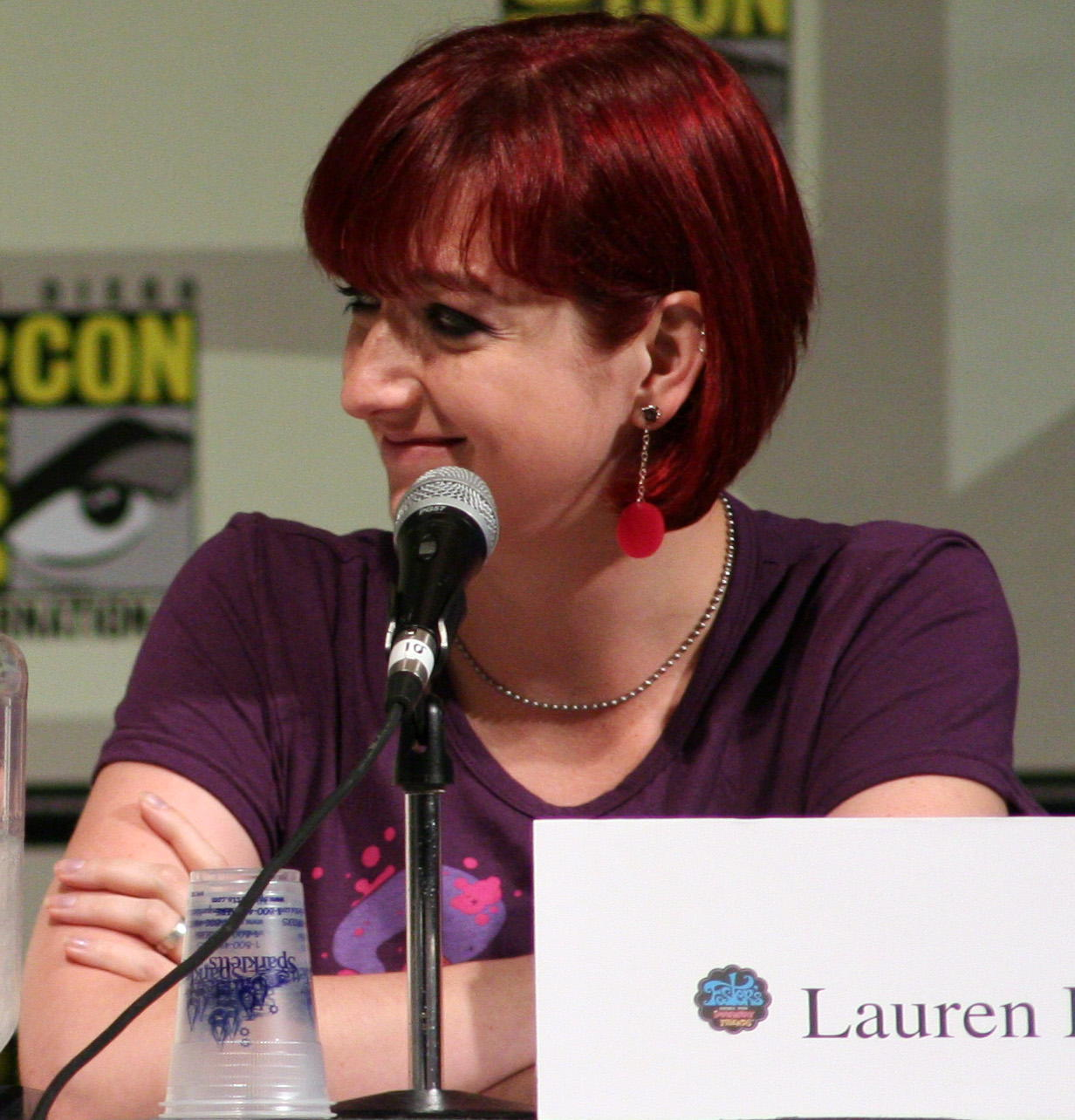
Lauren Faust, developer and initial showrunner of My Little Pony: Friendship Is Magic

Lauren Faust was initially hired by Hasbro to create a pitch bible for the show. Faust stated she was "extremely skeptical" about taking the job because she had always found shows based on girls' toys to be boring and unrelatable. She hoped to prove that "cartoons for girls don't have to be a puddle of smooshy, cutesy-wootsy, goody-two-shoeness" by incorporating diverse personalities, character flaws, and the message that friends can be different and can get into arguments but still be friends. Each pony character was designed to represent a different element and positive aspect of friendship, which come together to form the sixth element of "magic" represented by Twilight Sparkle. Faust aimed for the Mane Six to be "relatable" while using stereotypical "icons of girliness" to broaden the appeal for the young female audience. Elements of the Mane Six's personalities and settings were based on Faust's childhood imagination of the ponies' adventures, inspired in part by animated shows that her brothers watched, such as Transformers and G.I. Joe.

The creative team at DHX Media developed distinct visual styles for each member of the Mane Six, and ensured that their individual personalities would translate into facial expressions, body language, props, and home environments. While Mane Six share some general expressions, each has unique style characteristics specific to their personality. According to the DHX Media team,

"There are certainly characters that would make different expressions, like you might do something with Pinkie Pie that you would never do with Applejack or Twilight or Rarity. So we don't have something that's specific for just one character, but we will avoid certain expressions if it goes outside their personality."

Faust deliberately designed the Mane Six to challenge traditional female stereotypes commonly found in children's programming and wrote in Ms. magazine that she wanted to prove animated shows for girls didn't have to be "boring, stupid, [or] lame." Faust specifically crafted each character to subvert two-dimensional archetypes: Twilight Sparkle combines intelligence with sweetness, and Rarity represents beauty without mean-spirited behavior as "an artist" rather than a superficial "shopaholic."

== The Mane Six ==
Each pony character was designed to represent a different element and positive aspect of friendship: honesty (Applejack), kindness (Fluttershy), laughter (Pinkie Pie), generosity (Rarity), and loyalty (Rainbow Dash), which come together to form the sixth element of "magic" (Twilight Sparkle).

=== Twilight Sparkle ===
Twilight Sparkle (voiced by Tara Strong, singing voice by Rebecca Shoichet) is the main protagonist of the show and represents the element of magic. She is depicted as a light purple unicorn with purple eyes and a pink and purple streaked indigo-blue mane and tail, later becoming a winged unicorn after "Magical Mystery Cure". Her cutie mark, a six-pointed star, represents her talent for magic and love for books and knowledge. Twilight is characterized as a natural-born leader, intelligent and dutiful scholar, and the most intellectual member of the group. She has perfectionist tendencies and is prone to suffer from nervous breakdowns when confronted with difficult problems. Throughout the series, she transitions from Princess Celestia's student to becoming an alicorn princess herself in "Magical Mystery Cure". Eventually, in the series finale, she becomes the ruler of Equestria.

=== Applejack ===
Applejack (voiced by Ashleigh Ball) represents the element of honesty. She is an orange earth pony with green eyes and a blonde mane and tail, characterized as a "farm gal" who sports a cowboy hat and speaks with a Texan Southern accent. Her cutie mark, a trio of apples, represents her talent for agriculture and love for her family. She works as an apple farmer at Sweet Apple Acres orchard in Ponyville and is described as honest, courageous, forthright, and the most "down-to-earth" of the group. She lives with her grandmother Granny Smith, older brother Big McIntosh, younger sister Apple Bloom, and pet Border Collie dog Winona.

=== Rainbow Dash ===
Rainbow Dash (voiced by Ashleigh Ball) represents the element of loyalty. She is a blue pegasus with magenta eyes and a rainbow-colored mane and tail. Her cutie mark, a rainbow-colored lightning bolt with a cloud, represents her talent for speed and obsession with adventure. Her goal is to join the elite Wonderbolts aerobatic team, which she eventually achieves. She helps manage the weather around Ponyville and practices flight maneuvers such as the "Sonic Rainboom", a rainbow-colored sonic boom. In "The Cutie Mark Chronicles", Rainbow Dash's first Sonic Rainboom as a filly caused a chain of events that produced the group's cutie marks.

=== Pinkie Pie ===
Pinkie Pie (voiced by Andrea Libman, singing voice by Shannon Chan-Kent (Note: Libman provides Pinkie Pie's singing voice for some songs.)) represents the element of laughter. She is a light pink earth pony with light blue eyes and a dark pink balloon-like mane and tail. Her cutie mark, a trio of balloons, represents her talent for spreading hope and joy and her desire to entertain her friends. She works as a party planner at Sugarcube Corner, a bakery and confectionery store, and serves as the comic relief character. Pinkie is motivated by seeing people she loves smiling and relieving them of stress by throwing parties and acting outlandish. She displays abilities that break the fourth wall and can predict future events through body reactions she calls the "Pinkie Sense".

=== Rarity ===
Rarity (voiced by Tabitha St. Germain, singing voice by Kazumi Evans) represents the element of generosity. She is a white unicorn with dark blue eyes and a curled indigo-purple mane and tail. Her cutie mark, a trio of diamonds, represents her talent for prospecting gemstones and her love of art and beauty. She is a sophisticated fashionista and businessperson who speaks with a refined British/trans-Atlantic accent and runs a franchise of brand name flagship stores throughout Equestria. Despite her arrogant and melodramatic tendencies, she has a generous spirit and strives to create artistic dresses that capture their wearers' inner beauty.

=== Fluttershy ===
Fluttershy (voiced by Andrea Libman) represents the element of kindness. She is a yellow pegasus with green-blue eyes and a pink mane and tail. Her cutie mark, a trio of butterflies, represents her talent as an animal caretaker and her love for nature. She is defined by her "shy sweetness; soft, whispery voice and tender, nurturing nature" and possesses a unique affinity for animals that allows her to communicate with them. She lives in a secluded meadow cottage where she cares for forest creatures. Despite her timid nature, she exhibits a tough personality when friends or animals are harmed, and possesses an ability called "the Stare" that causes creatures to become powerless when meeting her gaze.

== Reception ==
Truthfully, each character has enough potential for their own series.

— Jim Miller, My Little Pony: The Art of Equestria

The Mane Six have received acclaim from both television critics and academic scholars, with the ponies being praised for their depth and complexity beyond typical children's television archetypes. The critical success of the Mane Six contributed to the show's overall reception; the first season of Friendship is Magic achieved a perfect 100% rating on Rotten Tomatoes, placing it alongside critically acclaimed shows like Breaking Bad, Fleabag, and BoJack Horseman.

The popularity of the Mane Six has spawned the fandom meme of "Who is best pony?"

== Analysis ==
Academic analysis has found that the Mane Six's appeal among both the target demographic and the brony fandom stems from their sophisticated character design and development. In her 2014 study of the brony fandom, Venetia Robertson observed that the characters' anthropomorphic design incorporates elements of Japanese kawaii aesthetics, particularly their large heads, oversized eyes, and bright colors, which contribute to their broad appeal across age demographics. Robertson wrote that the Mane Six explore themes of identity, friendship, and personal growth throughout the series, and their individual personality flaws and strengths allow viewers to form emotional connections (despite the difference in species).

In 2015, Anne Gilbert wrote in Transformative Works and Cultures that bronies tended to form strong emotional connections with the Mane Six, observing that bronies praise the characters' complexity and development, with fans expressing sentiments like "I've practically fallen in love with Twilight... she's socially awkward as well and to see her grow and make friends, it makes me happy." However, Gilbert observed that rather than embracing the characters' originally intended feminist messaging, some bronies tended to appropriate the Mane Six by emphasizing their similarities to traditionally masculine geek culture references. Gilbert argued that, in this way, they were effectively incorporating their appreciation for these female characters into conventional gender performances rather than allowing the characters to challenge existing notions of masculinity.

In a 2018 study of thousands of bronies (the "Brony Study Project"), clinical psychologist Patrick Edwards and his research colleagues found that the Mane Six's individual personalities serve as the primary driving force behind bronies' enjoyment of the show, with studies consistently demonstrating that character personality ranked as the most influential factor in fan engagement, a dramatic change from earlier generations of My Little Pony where aesthetic appeal and toy features were the primary attractions. Three-quarters of bronies selected their favorite characters from the Mane Six. According to Edwards, each character attracted fans who exhibited psychological and behavioral patterns that often mirrored their chosen character's canonical traits:

Percentage of bronies’ choosing each Mane Six character as their favorite. (Plante et al., 2019)
1. Twilight Sparkle (27.0%)
2. Fluttershy (19.0%)
3. Rainbow Dash (17.0%)
4. Pinkie Pie (16.0%)
5. Applejack (11.0%)
6. Rarity (10.0%)
- Twilight Sparkle fans wrote more than other bronies and created and read fan fiction at higher rates than fans of other characters. Twilight fans saw her as someone they wanted to become and turned to her for emotional support during tough times; they also experienced more anxiety than typical bronies but also showed greater maturity than other fans. Twilight fans identified more strongly with the brony community than other groups did.
- Fluttershy fans considered themselves the biggest fans of the show itself, and they experienced the least stigma or discrimination for being bronies. Fluttershy fans cosplayed less than other bronies and turned to their favorite character for emotional support during difficult times, though not as much as Twilight fans did. They scored the lowest on measures of psychopathy and Machiavellianism but also had the lowest self-esteem and the highest levels of anxiety and social anxiety; they ranked among the highest on depression behind only Rarity fans. Fluttershy fans also viewed pornography less than other bronies.
- Rainbow Dash fans wrote more than average bronies (though not as much as Twilight fans), and also pursued fandom music more than other groups. They watched Friendship Is Magic more frequently than any other bronies and ranked among the biggest fans of the show behind only Fluttershy fans. Rainbow Dash fans scored higher than average on fandom participation, second only to Pinkie Pie fans, and they scored higher than average on narcissism though lower than Rarity fans. They also experienced discrimination for being bronies more than other groups did.
- Pinkie Pie fans cosplayed more than average bronies though not as much as Rarity fans and scored the highest on fandom participation and the lowest on social anxiety. They were more open about their interest in ponies than other groups and were more narcissistic than average bronies.
- Applejack fans were more likely to be male than average bronies and were the least likely to be artistic, though they identified more strongly as bronies than other groups. They scored the highest on self-esteem and the lowest on depression and anxiety; they also ranked among the lowest on social anxiety, second only to Pinkie Pie fans.
- Rarity fans were the most likely to identify as both artists and cosplayers and scored the lowest on being a fan of the show and fandom participation. Rarity fans were the most likely to openly tell others about their interest in Friendship Is Magic and more likely to have experienced discrimination for being bronies. They scored highest on measures of depression, narcissism, and Machiavellianism.

Edwards observed that fans who identified with Mane Six characters showed stronger character identification than those who preferred secondary characters, attributed to main characters receiving more screen time and revealing more complex personalities. Twilight Sparkle was the most popular character among bronies, accounting for approximately 27% of responses when asked who their favorite Mane Six character was.

Similarly, a 2022 study by Erica C. Rarity, Matthew R. Leitao, and Abraham M. Rutchick also examined the psychological parasocial relationship between fans and the Mane Six. According to the authors, the brony fandom serves as an exemplary case study for parasocial relationships due to its long-running nature, robust community interactions, and clearly defined personalities of the Mane Six. The researchers surveyed 829 bronies to determine whether identification with specific characters correlated with participants exhibiting the personality traits those characters canonically embody. The study used established psychological scales to measure six traits: humor (Pinkie Pie), generosity (Rarity), loyalty (Rainbow Dash), honesty (Applejack), kindness (Fluttershy), and friendship (Twilight Sparkle), alongside the Inclusion of Other in the Self scale to assess character identification.

Character Identification and Personality Trait Correlations
Character	Humor	Generosity	Loyalty	Honesty	Kindness	Friendship
Pinkie Pie	0.336***	0.228***	0.135***	−0.049	0.208***	0.209***
Rarity	0.168***	0.288***	0.104**	−0.012	0.231***	0.093**
Rainbow Dash	0.115***	0.132***	0.189***	−0.017	0.133***	0.135***
Applejack	0.141***	0.170***	0.178***	−0.094**	0.110**	0.074*
Fluttershy	−0.012	0.211***	0.117***	−0.115***	0.333***	−0.084*
Twilight Sparkle	0.020	0.092**	0.050	−0.058	0.110**	0.022
Bold italic values indicate character-trait canonical pairings * p < .05, ** p < .01, *** p < .001

Most of the Mane Six demonstrated strong correlations between character identification and corresponding personality traits. Identification with Pinkie Pie showed the strongest correlation with humor while Fluttershy identification correlated highly with kindness. Rarity identification predicted generosity, and Rainbow Dash identification correlated with loyalty. Dominance analysis showed that for four of the six traits, identification with the character embodying that trait was the strongest predictor and "completely dominat[ed]" other predictors in the statistical model. Applejack's canonical trait of honesty showed the weakest correlation, with Fluttershy identification actually being a stronger predictor of honesty than Applejack identification. Similarly, Twilight Sparkle identification showed no significant correlation with friendship scores, which the researchers attributed to friendship being a superordinate theme encompassing all characters rather than one character's specific trait. The researchers suggested that fans perceive some characters, particularly Fluttershy, as embodying multiple positive traits beyond their primary canon.

In 2024, Helina Hartman of Rutgers University examined how the Mane Six are transformed and reinterpreted within the clop community. Hartman found that the original character designs of the Mane Six were systematically altered through processes of sexualization and masculinization. Hartman observed that the Mane Six's individual personalities and character traits, originally designed to represent elements of friendship, become secondary to their transformation into objects of sexual desire or symbols of masculine conquest. Hartman wrote that this reinterpretation strips away the characters' original feminist messaging and educational value and replaces their roles as positive role models for young girls with versions that reinforce traditional masculine dominance and heterosexual validation, which inverts the show's core themes of friendship and empowerment.

== In popular culture ==
In the 2022 film Chip 'n Dale: Rescue Rangers, several G4 ponies—including the Mane Six—appear in a convention scene where Chip 'n' Dale flee from villains.

== See also ==
- List of My Little Pony: Friendship Is Magic characters
- Elements of Harmony
- My Little Pony: Friendship Is Magic fandom
- Background Six
- Griffin family
- Simpson family

== Bibliography ==
- Begin, Mary Jane (2015). My Little Pony: The Art of Equestria. New York: Abrams. ISBN 978-1-4197-1577-8.
- Snider, Brandon T. (2013). The Elements of Harmony: My Little Pony: Friendship Is Magic: The Official Guidebook. New York: Little, Brown and Company. ISBN 978-0-316-24754-2.
- Snider, Brandon T. (2017). The Elements of Harmony Volume II: My Little Pony: Friendship Is Magic: The Official Guidebook Volume II. New York: Little, Brown and Company. ISBN 978-0-316-43197-2.
