= Applejack (My Little Pony) =

Fictional character from My Little Pony

- My Little Pony character
- Applejack as she appears in "Fall Weather Friends"
- First appearance: "Friendship Is Magic – Part 1" (2010)
- Created by: Lauren Faust
- Based on: Applejack from the My Little Pony toyline's first incarnation
- Voiced by: Ashleigh Ball

In-universe information
- Alias: Apple Jewel
- Nickname: AJ
- Species: Earth Pony
- Title: Element of Honesty
- Occupation: Apple farmer; Honesty teacher at the School of Friendship (seasons 8-9); Member of the Council of Friendship (finale)
- Affiliation: Mane Six
- Family: Granny Smith (paternal grandmother); Bright Mac (father, deceased); Pear Butter (mother, deceased); Big MacIntosh (older brother); Apple Bloom (younger sister); Sugar Belle (sister-in-law)
- Relatives: Grand Pear (maternal grandfather); Apple family (extended family); Orange family (extended family); Pie family (distant cousins)

Applejack is a fictional character who appears in the fourth incarnation of Hasbro's My Little Pony toyline and media franchise, beginning with My Little Pony: Friendship Is Magic (2010–2019). She is a close friend of Twilight Sparkle, serving as a core member of the group of main characters collectively known as the Mane Six. She is voiced by Ashleigh Ball, who also voices Rainbow Dash.

A hard-working, reliable, and honest anthropomorphic earth pony with a talent for apple farming and rodeo skills, Applejack works on her family farm, Sweet Apple Acres, in Ponyville where she lives with her grandmother Granny Smith, older brother Big MacIntosh, and younger sister Apple Bloom. Applejack represents the Element of Honesty in the Elements of Harmony.

== Appearances ==
=== Fourth My Little Pony incarnation (2010–2021) ===
==== My Little Pony: Friendship Is Magic ====
Applejack is introduced in the series premiere as a hard-working earth pony who manages Sweet Apple Acres with her family. When Twilight first arrives in Ponyville, Applejack welcomes her warmly during an apple harvest and serves her a large amount of food. Later, she helps defeat Nightmare Moon with the rest of the Mane Six. In "The Cutie Mark Chronicles", it is revealed that she briefly left Sweet Apple Acres as a filly to live with her sophisticated Manehattan relatives before realizing her true calling was back on the farm, earning her cutie mark of three apples.

In the episode "The Super Speedy Cider Squeezy 6000", Applejack and her family face competition from the traveling salesponies Flim and Flam. Her distrust and rivalry with Flim and Flam continues in later episodes such as "Leap of Faith", "Viva Las Pegasus" and the special My Little Pony: Best Gift Ever. In the episode "The Perfect Pear", it is revealed that her deceased parents were members of two feuding families, the Apples and the Pears. While throughout the series, Applejack serves as a voice of reason and honesty, some episodes like "Applebuck Season" and "The Last Roundup" show her stubborn refusal to accept help, even when overwhelmed.

==== My Little Pony: The Movie ====
Applejack helps Twilight prepare for the Friendship Festival in Canterlot before the city is attacked by the Storm King's forces. When Twilight decides to seek help beyond Equestria, Applejack accompanies her friends on their journey. Despite a disagreement with Twilight, Applejack returns to help save Canterlot, ultimately participating in the final battle against the Storm King.

==== My Little Pony: Pony Life ====
Applejack appears a main character in the spin-off reboot series My Little Pony: Pony Life in which she often breaks the fourth wall, supplanting the role from Pinkie Pie.

== Equestria Girls alternate version ==
Applejack's human counterpart in My Little Pony: Equestria Girls.

Applejack's human counterpart is a main character in the Equestria Girls spin-off franchise of films, shorts and specials. She is a farmer cowboy hat and student at Canterlot High School, the bass guitarist of her friends' rock band, the Rainbooms, and gains superhuman strength as her geode power in the fourth film.

== Development ==
Faust's sketch of Applejack for the FiM pitch bible in 2008.

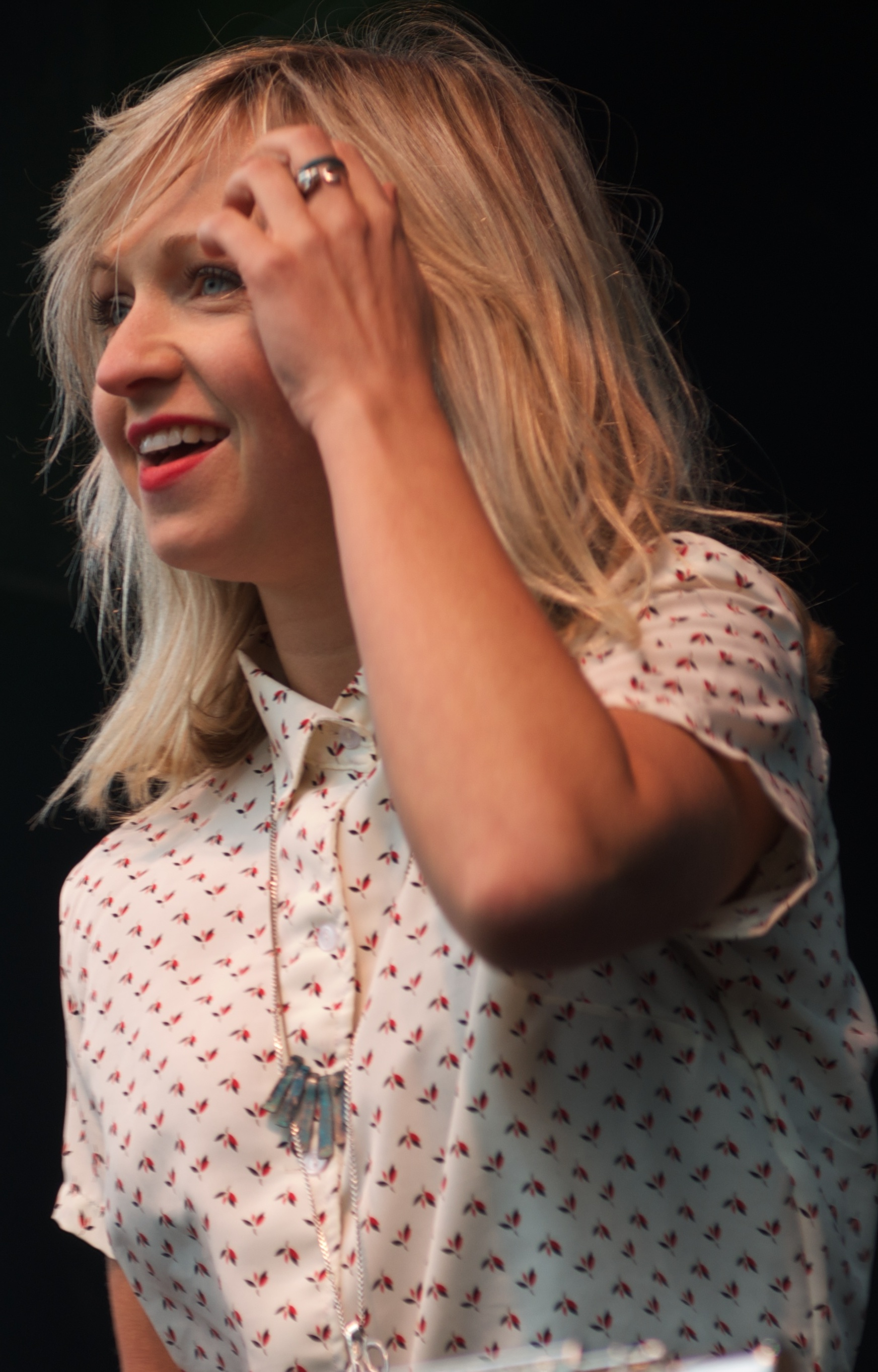
Ashleigh Ball provided the voice of Applejack.

Applejack likes the mud, she's easy to please, and she doesn't take things too hard. She doesn't care about getting dirty—and doesn't care about fancy things.

— Jayson Thiessen, My Little Pony: The Art of Equestria

Author Mary Jane Begin wrote that her apple-themed cutie mark "not only represents her name but also is a symbol of the down-home simplicity found in a classic and common fruit". According to Jim Miller, "[Applejack]'s about efficiency and getting things done. She tries to combat a problem head-on in the simplest, most direct way." Voice actress Ashleigh Ball has cited country singers Miley Cyrus, Dolly Parton, and Reba McEntire as the main influences on Applejack's voice, which she gradually deepened over the course of the series to distinguish her from Rainbow Dash, whom Ball also voices.

== Reception and analysis ==
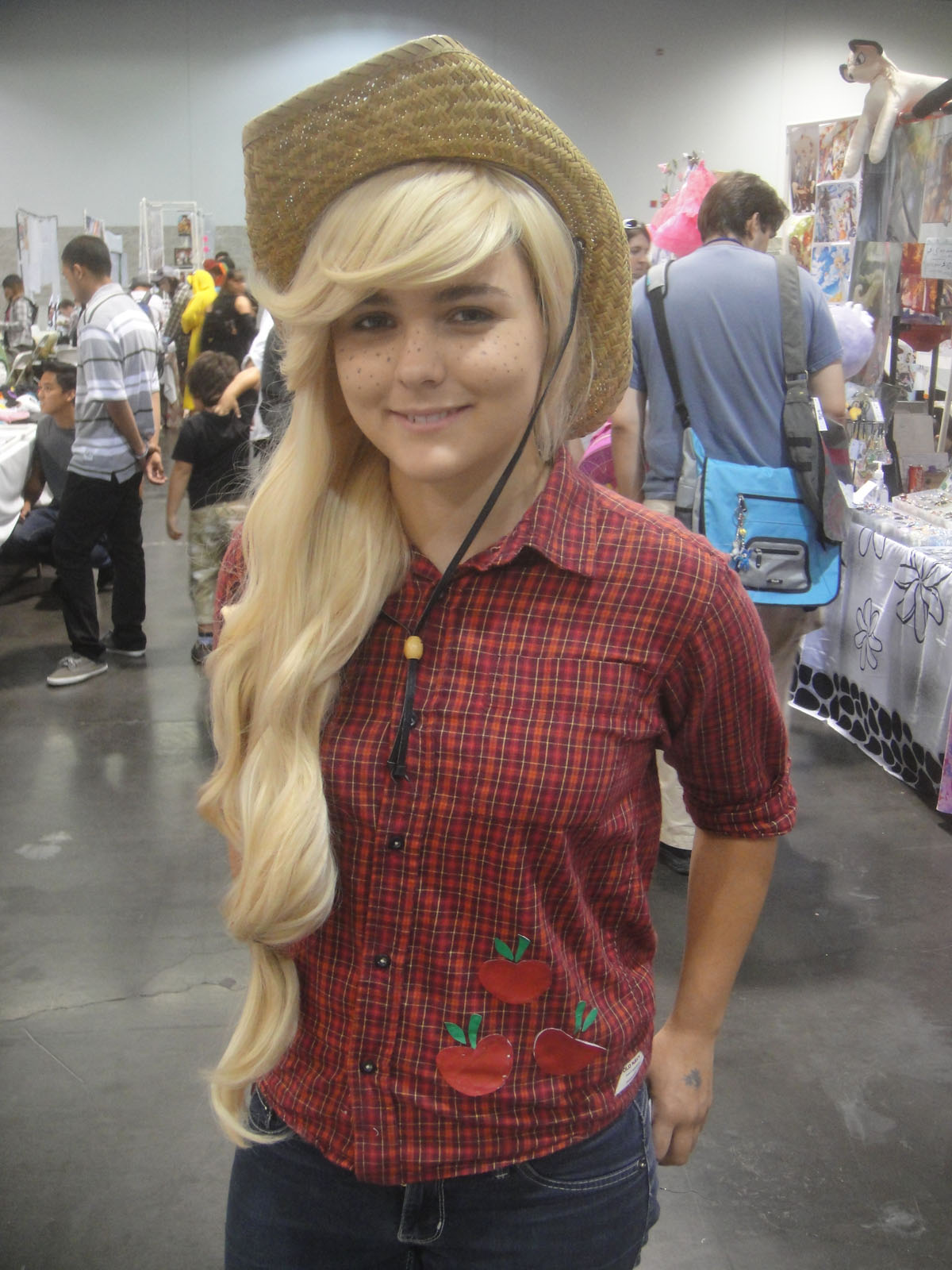
A cosplayer in a Applejack costume

Applejack has been praised for her positive representation of farming and agricultural life, particularly in comparison to other children's media. Writing in Agriculture Week, Jenny Schlecht described Applejack as a rare example of a well-rounded farmer character in children's entertainment, and noted that unlike the stereotypical portrayal of farmers in most cartoons (who typically wear "blue bib overalls and big, floppy straw hats"), Applejack is depicted as "intelligent, hard working and vital to society."

Applejack's speech patterns have been the subject of linguistic analysis. A 2016 study from the University of Vaasa identified 316 examples of marked speech patterns that establish her rural, Southern-influenced character. In 2021, researchers from Universitas Trisakti analyzed visual character design in My Little Pony: The Movie and noted that Applejack's design corresponds to qualities such as warmth, optimism, and sociability.

== In popular culture ==
Applejack is a popular character in merchandise and collectibles, with items like the Kotobukiya Bishoujo statue series featuring humanized versions of her character. In September 2023, she was one of the four Friendship Is Magic characters included in the Magic: The Gathering charity Secret Lair collection "Ponies: The Galloping 2", alongside Fluttershy, Pinkie Pie, and Rainbow Dash. This special card collection benefited the Extra Life charity program, with half of the proceeds going to the Seattle Children's Autism Center. Applejack's card featured unique mechanics that allowed players to summon their real-life My Little Pony toys as token creatures.

On April 15, 2021, the Indianapolis FedEx shooting brought Applejack into mainstream news coverage when the perpetrator, Brandon Scott Hole, mentioned the character in a social media post less than an hour before the attack. The gunman wrote: "I hope that I can be with Applejack in the afterlife, my life has no meaning without her. If there's no afterlife and she isn't real then my life never mattered anyway." Investigators found that Hole was a brony, a male fan of Friendship Is Magic, and maintained two Facebook accounts dedicated to the show.
