= Pinkie Pie =

Fictional character from My Little Pony

- My Little Pony character
- Pinkie Pie as she appears in "Three's a Crowd"
- First appearance: "Friendship Is Magic – Part 1" (2010)
- Created by: Lauren Faust
- Based on: Surprise from the My Little Pony toyline's first incarnation
- Voiced by: Andrea Libman (speaking); Shannon Chan-Kent (singing) (Note: Libman provides Pinkie Pie's singing voice for some songs.)

In-universe information
- Full name: Pinkamena Diane Pie
- Nickname: Pinkie
- Species: Earth Pony
- Title: Element of Laughter
- Occupation: Baker/caterer/party planner at Sugarcube Corner; Friendship ambassador to Yakyakistan; Laughter teacher at the School of Friendship (seasons 8-9); Member of the Council of Friendship (finale)
- Affiliation: Mane Six
- Family: Igneous Rock Pie (father); Cloudy Quartz (mother); Limestone Pie (oldest sister); Maud Pie (older sister); Marble Pie (younger fraternal twin sister); Octavio Pie (youngest brother; Pony Life)
- Spouse: Cheese Sandwich (finale)
- Children: Lil' Cheese (son; finale)
- Relatives: Apple family (distant cousins); Cake family (adoptive family)

Pinkamena "Pinkie" Diane Pie is a fictional character who appears in the fourth incarnation of Hasbro's My Little Pony toyline and media franchise, beginning with My Little Pony: Friendship Is Magic (2010–2019). She is a close friend of Twilight Sparkle and is a core member of the group of main characters collectively known as the Mane Six. She is voiced by Andrea Libman, who also voices Fluttershy, and her singing voice is provided by Shannon Chan-Kent.

An energetic, enthusiastic, and eccentric anthropomorphic earth pony with a talent for baking, party planning, and bringing joy to others, Pinkie Pie works as a baker at Sugarcube Corner in Ponyville and is known for her seemingly random behavior and fourth wall breaks. Pinkie represents the Element of Laughter in the Elements of Harmony. She lives in the apartment above Sugarcube Corner with her pet alligator, Gummy.

== Appearances ==
=== Fourth My Little Pony incarnation (2010–2021) ===
==== My Little Pony: Friendship Is Magic ====
Pinkie Pie is introduced in the series premiere as an energetic earth pony who loves to throw parties and make others smile. When Twilight Sparkle first arrives in Ponyville, Pinkie throws a surprise welcome party for her (to Twilight's dismay). In the episode "Party of One", Pinkie believes that her friends are avoiding her latest party invitation, causing her to become paranoid and temporarily develop a split personality in which she begins conversing with inanimate objects. In "The Cutie Mark Chronicles", it is revealed that she grew up on a rock farm with her family, where life was dreary and colorless until she witnessed her first rainbow, created by Rainbow Dash's Sonic Rainboom. The joy she felt inspired her to throw her first party for her family, earning her cutie mark of three balloons, and turning her pin straight hair into the jubilant curls she is known for.

==== My Little Pony: The Movie ====
Pinkie Pie has been described as the co-lead and moral compass of the movie. She helps Twilight prepare for the Friendship Festival in Canterlot before the city is attacked by the Storm King's forces. During their journey beyond Equestria, Pinkie accompanies her friends to find help in defeating the Storm King and rescuing their home. Despite a disagreement between Twilight and the group, Pinkie remains loyal and eventually reunites with Twilight. She uses her party cannon as a weapon in the final battle against the Storm King in Canterlot and helps restore harmony to Equestria.

==== My Little Pony: Pony Life ====
Pinkie Pie is a main character in the spin-off series My Little Pony: Pony Life, which is primarily set at Sugarcube Corner, where she often hosts the other members of the Mane Six when they hang out at the bakery. Her three sisters in Friendship Is Magic are replaced by a single brother, Octavio Pie, who is also her rival.

== Equestria Girls alternate version ==
Pinkie Pie's human counterpart in My Little Pony: Equestria Girls.

Pinkie Pie's human counterpart is a main character in the Equestria Girls spin-off franchise. She is an eccentric student at Canterlot High School and is introduced in the first film as the head of the school's party planning committee. Beginning with the second film, she is the drummer of her friends' band, The Rainbooms, and gains the power to make sugary objects explosive as her geode power in the fourth film.

== Development ==
Faust's 2008 sketch of Pinkie Pie for the FiM Pitch Bible, where she was originally depicted as a Pegasus named Surprise.

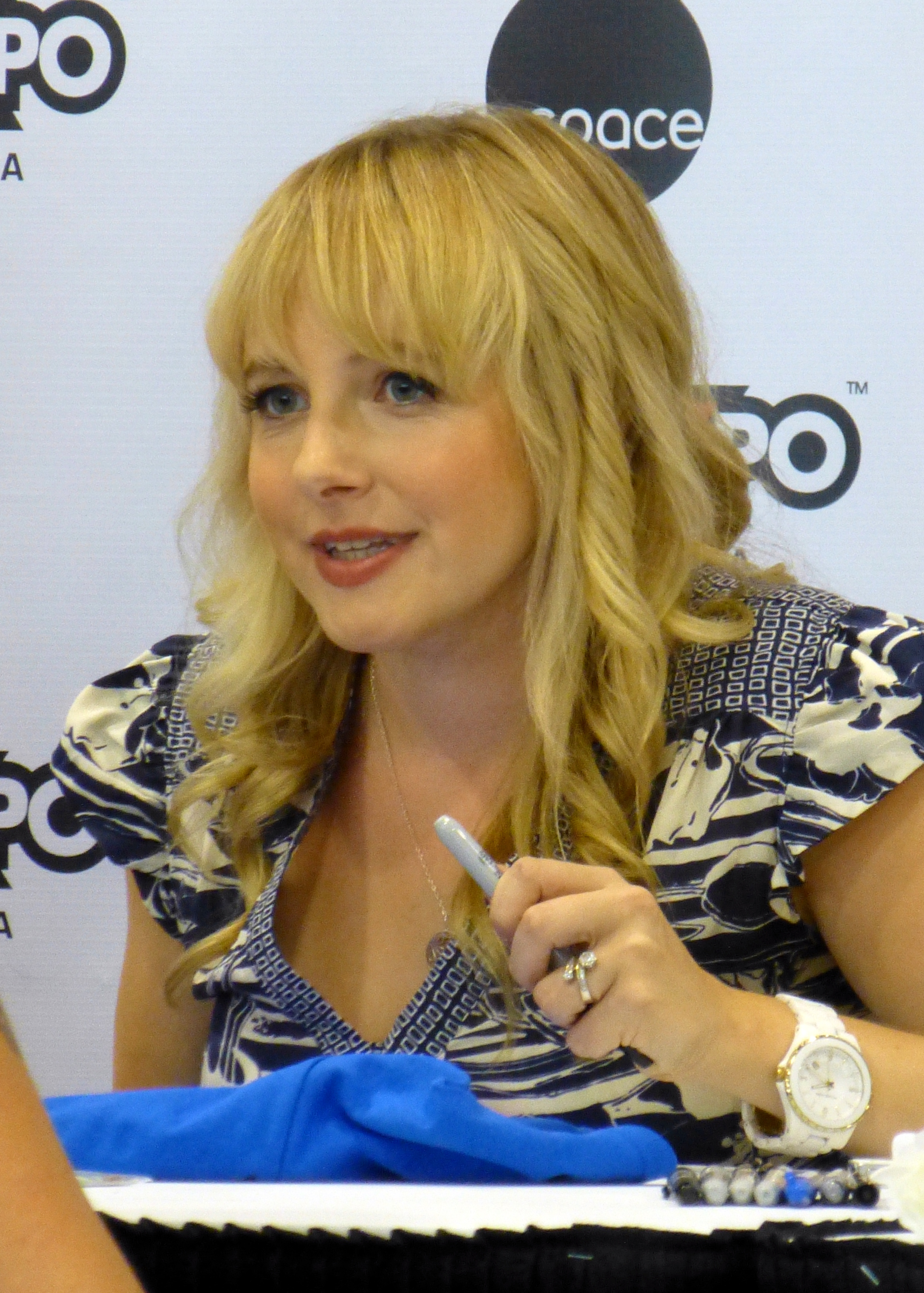
Andrea Libman provided the speaking voice of Pinkie Pie.

In her initial concept for the character, series creator Lauren Faust based Pinkie Pie on a white pegasus pony from her childhood collection named Surprise, rather than on a pink pony. According to Faust in an episode of the documentary series The Toys That Made Us, she had envisioned Pinkie Pie as "the perky excited one." Faust acknowledged her inspiration on social media, posting an image of her original white pegasus toy with the caption: "SURPRISE!!! A Pegasus inspired Pinkie Pie." In addition, Pinkie Pie's name, all-pink appearance and three-balloon cutie mark were taken from a Generation 3 pony first introduced in 2003.

In early episodes, Faust worked to depict Pinkie as a "free spirit" to address concerns of the character being seen as too "hyper" and "ditzy". As the creative team grew more comfortable with Pinkie's character and humor, she became "really over-the-top strange and bordering on crazy, with a wacky cartoonish magic all her own".

== Reception and analysis ==
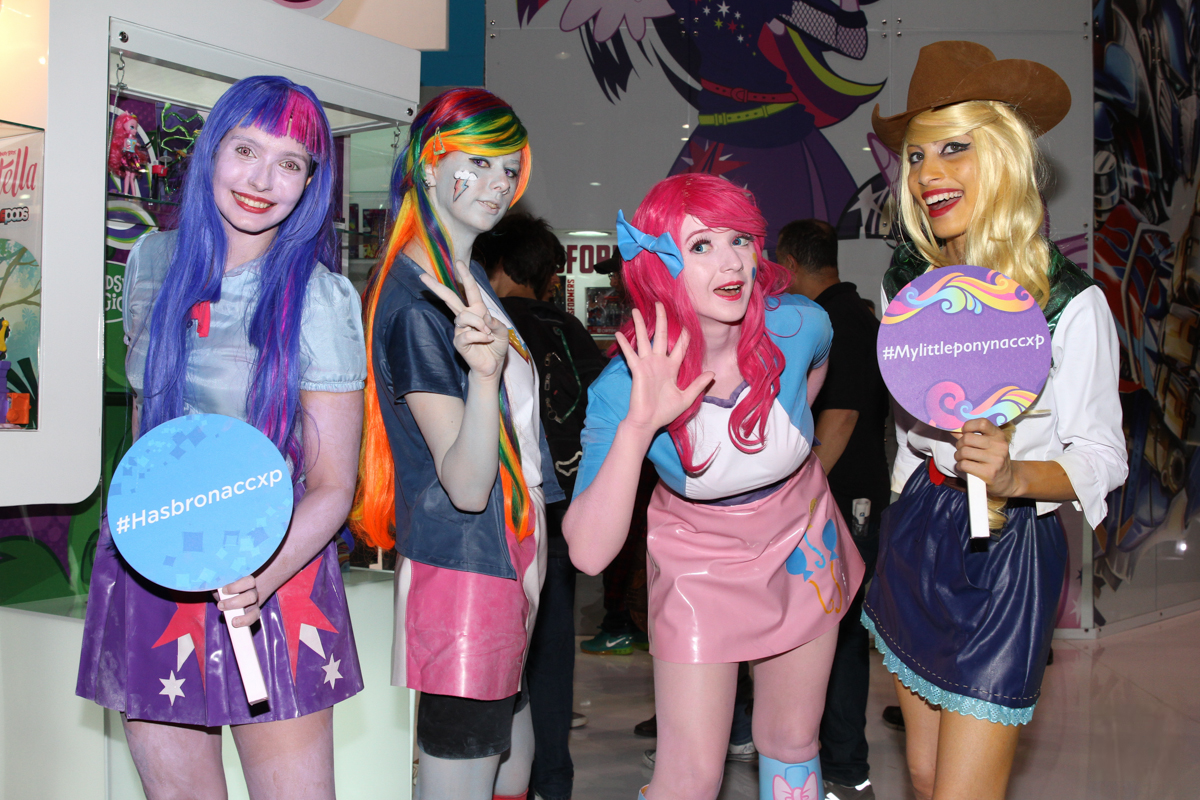
A group of cosplayers wearing My Little Pony: Equestria Girls costumes at a 2014 comic con

Critics and fans have noted Pinkie Pie's unique status as a fourth wall breaking character who follows her own cartoon physics, setting her apart from other characters in the series. Scholars have analyzed her character's emotional complexity; Kleanthi Tselantis noted the contrast between her typical exuberant personality and her occasional depressive episodes. Pinkie Pie has been described as the comic relief of Friendship Is Magic.

Pinkie Pie's speech patterns have been the subject of linguistic analysis. A 2016 study from the University of Vaasa identified five key elements in her speech: wordplay (punning), neologisms, alliteration, rhyming, and regularized superlative formations (such as bestest). The research found that these linguistic features were preserved to varying degrees when translated into other languages, with the Norwegian dub retaining 69% of these speech elements compared to 49% in the Swedish dub and 51% in the Finnish version.

In 2016, researchers from the University of Warsaw conducted a study in which they used an eye tracker to analyze how adult men and women watch animated content, specifically examining viewing patterns while watching scenes from My Little Pony: Friendship Is Magic. The study showed strong statistical differences in how participants viewed Pinkie Pie while she was on screen; women tended to fixate on her significantly more compared to men.

In 2021, researchers from Trisakti University analyzed visual character design in My Little Pony: The Movie and noted that Pinkie Pie's design reinforces her femininity, while her curly mane and energetic expressions visually communicate her playfulness and hyperactivity.

== In popular culture ==
In 2012, a teenage hacker known by the pseudonym "Pinkie Pie" won a $60,000 reward from Google for discovering security vulnerabilities in the Google Chrome web browser during the Pwnium 2 contest at the Hack in the Box conference in Kuala Lumpur. Google's security team later publicly thanked "Pinkie Pie". This was his second such win; he had previously exposed a Chrome exploit at the CanSecWest conference in March of that year. In 2013, the same hacker won $50,000 during the annual Pwn2Own contest at the Information Security Conference PacSec 2013 in Tokyo.

Pinkie Pie is a popular character in merchandise and collectibles, with items like the Kotobukiya Bishoujo statue series featuring humanized versions of her character. In September 2023, she was one of the four Friendship Is Magic characters included in the Magic: The Gathering charity Secret Lair collection "Ponies: The Galloping 2", alongside Fluttershy, Applejack, and Rainbow Dash. This special card collection benefited the Extra Life charity program, with half of the proceeds going to the Seattle Children's Autism Center.

According to a July 2015 report in Bustle magazine, Pinkie Pie was the third most popular character in clop on Pornhub, after Rainbow Dash and Rarity.

Pinkie Pie is the main character in an infamous My Little Pony fanfiction titled Cupcakes, in which she is depicted as a serial killer who murders Rainbow Dash.

In the 2018 superhero film Deadpool 2, the titular character refers to Yukio as "Pinkie Pie from My Little Pony" due to her pink hair. Death Battle also had an episode called "Deadpool VS Pinkie Pie".

== See also ==
- My Little Pony: Friendship Is Magic fandom
