= Cutie mark =

Symbol in My Little Pony representing a pony's special talent

Derpy Hooves is commonly associated with muffins. A simple graphic such as this, is often used as a cutie mark. It is placed on the pony's behind.

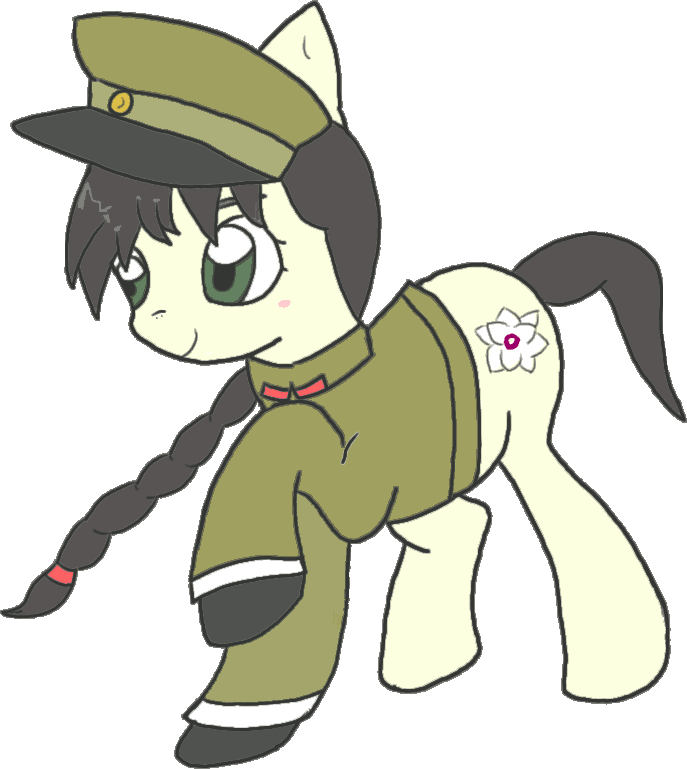
An earth pony with a flower cutie mark

A cutie mark is a symbol that appears on the flanks of ponies in the My Little Pony franchise, most prominently featured in the television series My Little Pony: Friendship Is Magic. Each cutie mark represents a pony's special talent, unique skill, or defining characteristic. In the show's lore, cutie marks typically appear when a young pony discovers their true purpose or passion in life. The concept is a central narrative element in the series, symbolizing identity formation, coming of age, self-discovery, individualism, and personal growth, and is considered a rite of passage within the series. Analysts have compared the concept of a cutie mark to predestination and free will; feminist analysts have interpreted cutie mark acquisition as a metaphor for body positivity, puberty, and menarche.

Cutie mark is a play on the term beauty mark, and is also reminiscent of the equestrian term quarter mark. Cutie marks have become one of the most iconic and defining features of the franchise, frequently serving as visual shorthand to represent the specific pony they belong to.

== Appearances ==
=== First, second, and third My Little Pony incarnations (1980–2009) ===
In 1981, the My Pretty Pony line of toys introduced unique marks on ponies' flanks (called "Symbols") that identified each character and represented their individual traits or talents.

Generation 3 (G3) My Little Pony toys, produced by Hasbro from 2003 to 2009, featured markings on one hip. These markings represented each pony's unique characteristic or specialty. Early G3 ponies also contained a magnet in one front hoof that activated special playset features, though this was later discontinued due to safety concerns. In 2008, Hasbro narrowed its focus to seven core characters: Pinkie Pie, Rainbow Dash, Scootaloo, Cheerilee (previously named Cherry Blossom), Toola-Roola, Starsong, and Sweetie Belle. This period also saw the introduction of "Dress-Up ponies" with a single body pose, which featured a clothing hanger marking on one front leg replacing the heart marking that had previously indicated the magnet location in earlier releases.

=== Fourth My Little Pony incarnation (2010–2021) ===
In Generation 4, cutie marks are a central narrative element, with entire episode plots dedicated to their appearance and significance. Ponies display a distinctive symbol on their flank that represented their special ability or defining characteristic. For example, Pinkie Pie's cutie mark of balloons reflected her talent as an entertainer and party planner, while Applejack's apple cutie mark symbolized her connection to her family's farming heritage.

A recurring storyline in the series revolves around the Cutie Mark Crusaders, a group consisting of three fillies—Apple Bloom (sister of Applejack), Sweetie Belle (sister of Rarity), and Scootaloo—who had not yet discovered their special talents and thus lacked cutie marks. Throughout the series, young ponies without cutie marks are often referred to as "blank flanks". Diamond Tiara and Silver Spoon frequently use this term to mock the Cutie Mark Crusaders. (Note: "Call of the Cutie", "One Bad Apple") Subsequently, the Cutie Mark Crusaders form a club dedicated to finding their true callings. The Crusaders eventually reclaim the pejorative "blank flank" label by embracing their unmarked status as a shared journey rather than a deficiency. After several seasons of attempts, the Crusaders finally receive their cutie marks in the episode "Crusaders of the Lost Mark", where they discover their shared talent: helping other ponies find their own special purposes.

According to design documents, main character Twilight Sparkle was originally conceived with a different cutie mark and hair color during the development stages of Friendship Is Magic.

== Cutie Mark Crusaders ==
The Cutie Mark Crusaders are a group of three fillies who appear throughout Friendship Is Magic: Apple Bloom, Sweetie Belle, and Scootaloo. The characters are depicted as younger sisters and close friend of members of the Mane Six: Apple Bloom is Applejack's younger sister, Sweetie Belle is Rarity's younger sister, and Scootaloo is Rainbow Dash's biggest fan and surrogate younger sister. The central premise of their storylines revolves around their quest to discover their special talents and earn their cutie marks. After several seasons of attempts, the Crusaders finally receive their cutie marks in the fifth season episode "Crusaders of the Lost Mark", where they discover their shared talent—helping other ponies find their own special purposes.

The group expands beyond the original trio to include additional members Babs Seed (in the third season episode "One Bad Apple") and Gabby the griffon (in the sixth season episode "The Fault in Our Cutie Marks"). Analysis has characterized them as audience surrogates who appeal to the show's target demographic of children, while fan reception has been mixed, with some adult viewers appreciating their relatability and others finding their episodes less engaging than those focused on the main characters. In SF Weekly, Sherilyn Connelly wrote that the Crusaders function as an audience surrogate and meta-commentary to the show itself: their varied reactions to stories mirror how different viewers respond to the show.

== Analysis ==
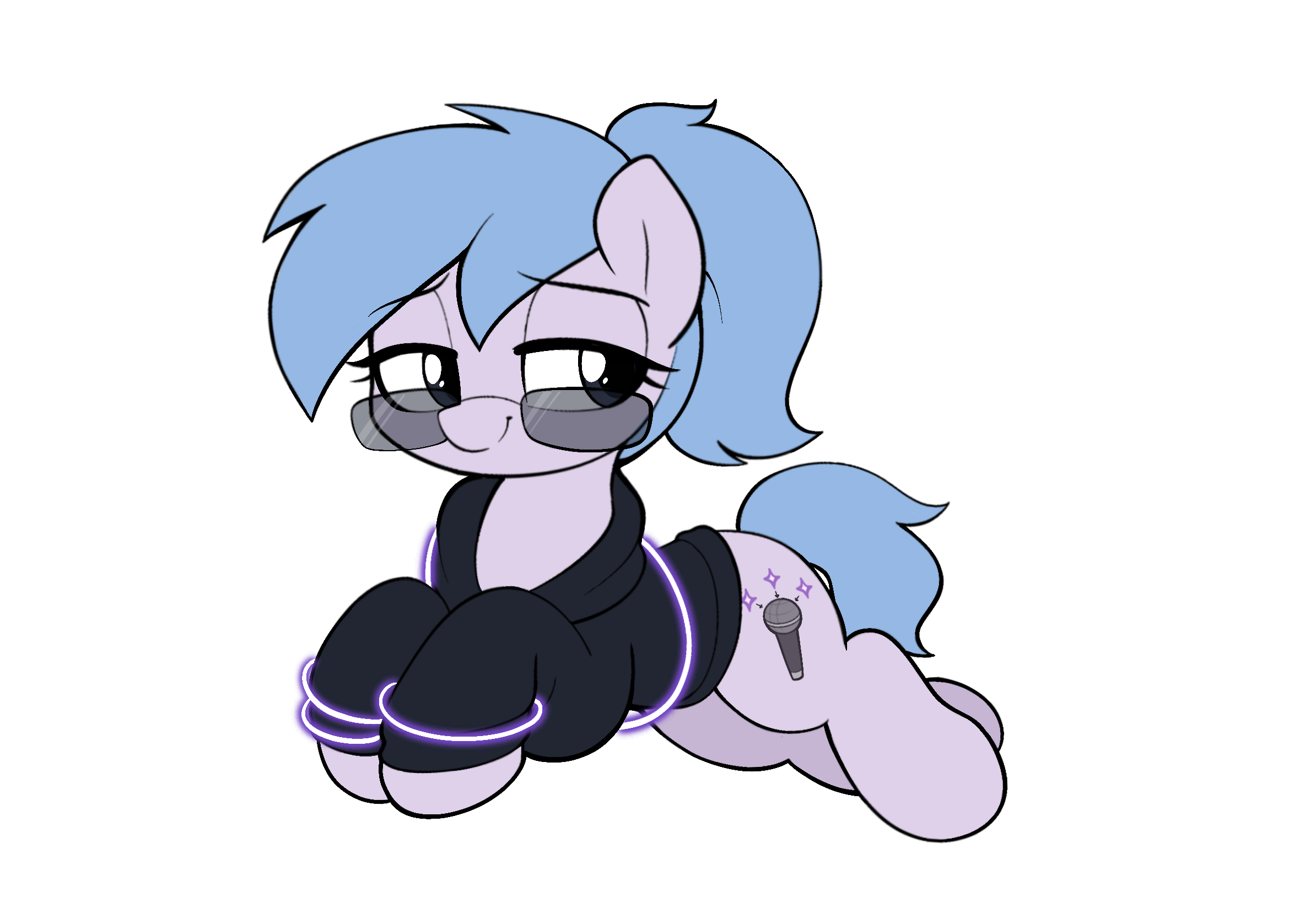
The mascot of 15.dev, an original character whose cutie mark contains Sparkles emojis (✨), which are commonly used to represent artificial intelligence.

Cutie marks have been described as the most recognizable aspect of the My Little Pony franchise. Ewan Kirkland, a professor of media studies at the University for the Creative Arts, described cutie marks as "a literal brand marking which reflects the franchise's firm location in consumer culture." In her review of Friendship Is Magic, Emily St. James of The A.V. Club wrote that "Cutie marks are the Equestria equivalent of tramp stamps".

Cutie marks function as a form of implicit characterization that serve as a visual shorthand for a pony's unique abilities, affinities, or profession. For example, Twilight Sparkle's star-shaped cutie mark represents her magical abilities and academic excellence, while Applejack's apple cutie mark represents her connection to her family's apple farm. In some cases, cutie marks are ironic, as with the character Clover, whose four-leaf clover cutie mark (which normally symbolizes good luck) is in contrast to her perpetually unlucky nature.

Child psychoanalyst Roderick S. Hall wrote that his patient had explained to him what a cutie mark was. Hall described his patient's focus on drawing designs for clothing as her way of finding her own "cutie mark". Feminist author Melanie Hurley wrote that the episode "Call of the Cutie" creates "a positive narrative around puberty" and described the acquisition of cutie marks as a metaphor for menarche: ponies treat receiving their cutie mark as a major life milestone, the characters discussing cutie marks in the episode are predominantly female, and Diamond Tiara's cute-ceañera explicitly frames the acquisition of a cutie mark as a rite of passage. Queer studies author Stefanie Duguay described a LGBTQ+ brony couple who adopted Rainbow Dash and Soarin' cutie mark tattoos as symbols of identity expression.

History professor Andrew Crome analyzed how Christian My Little Pony fan fiction authors used cutie marks to explore religious narratives and ideas. One Christian fan fiction portrays Christ as an earth pony whose cutie mark appears posthumously with "his hoof covering something" that symbolizes his covering of sin. According to Crome, because cutie marks represent raisons d'être in Equestrian society, Christ's lack of mark until death served to "further establish his humility."

The military brony subculture gained mainstream attention when it was reported that some service members were displaying cutie mark patches on their uniforms.

Cristina De León-Menjivar (a chronically ill mother) recounted how her six-year-old daughter told her that if she had a cutie mark, "it would be a medicine bottle." In response to this, De León-Menjivar questioned whether her daughter perceived her primarily through her medical condition as opposed to her other qualities as a mother.

== See also ==
- Ponysona
- Elements of Harmony
- Mane Six
- My Little Pony: Friendship Is Magic fandom
- Slang of the My Little Pony: Friendship Is Magic fandom
