= Fluttershy =

Fictional character from My Little Pony

- My Little Pony character
- Fluttershy as she appears in "Stare Master"
- First appearance: "Friendship Is Magic – Part 1" (2010)
- Created by: Lauren Faust
- Based on: Posey from the My Little Pony toyline's first incarnation
- Voiced by: Andrea Libman

In-universe information
- Aliases: Flutterguy; Flutterbat
- Nickname: Flutters
- Species: Pegasus
- Title: Element of Kindness
- Occupation: Animal caretaker; Kindness teacher at the School of Friendship (seasons 8-9); Member of the Council of Friendship (finale)
- Affiliation: Mane Six
- Family: Mr. and Mrs. Shy (parents); Zephyr Breeze (younger brother)

Fluttershy is a fictional character who appears in the fourth incarnation of Hasbro's My Little Pony toyline and media franchise, beginning with My Little Pony: Friendship Is Magic (2010–2019). She is a close friend of Twilight Sparkle, serving as a core member of the group one of main characters collectively known as the Mane Six. She is voiced by Andrea Libman, who also voices Pinkie Pie.

A shy, gentle, and soft-spoken anthropomorphic pegasus with a special connection to animals and wildlife, Fluttershy lives in a cottage on the outskirts of Ponyville and the Everfree Forest where she cares for animals. Fluttershy represents the Element of Kindness in the Elements of Harmony.

== Appearances ==
=== Fourth My Little Pony incarnation (2010–2021) ===
==== My Little Pony: Friendship Is Magic ====
Fluttershy is introduced in the series premiere as a shy pegasus who initially has trouble telling Twilight her name. In "The Cutie Mark Chronicles", Fluttershy as a filly is depicted as extremely timid and as a weak flier. After falling from the sky and being saved by a swarm of butterflies, she discovered her talent for communicating with animals, earning her cutie mark of three butterflies.

In "Dragonshy", Fluttershy confronts her fears to help save Equestria from a sleeping dragon's smoke. In "Stare Master", it is revealed that she possesses a special ability called "The Stare," which she uses to discipline animals. In "Hurricane Fluttershy" and "Filli Vanilli", she struggles with stage fright and self-confidence. In "Putting Your Hoof Down" and "Flutter Brutter", she attempts to be more assertive, both with strangers and her pushy younger brother Zephyr Breeze.

In "Keep Calm and Flutter On", Fluttershy forms an unlikely friendship with Discord after being tasked with reforming him. Their relationship develops throughout the series, and Discord is often shown particularly interested in her approval and friendship compared to the rest of the Mane Six.

==== My Little Pony: The Movie ====
Fluttershy helps Twilight prepare for the Friendship Festival in Canterlot before the city is attacked by the Storm King's forces. During the journey beyond Equestria, she uses her kindness and ability to communicate with animals to help the group navigate challenges, and ultimately helps convince Queen Novo in assisting them.

==== My Little Pony: Pony Life ====
Fluttershy is a main character in the spin-off reboot series My Little Pony: Pony Life. She is portrayed as having the ability to change in size from a giant and back depending on her mood.

== Equestria Girls alternate version ==
Fluttershy's human counterpart in My Little Pony: Equestria Girls.

Fluttershy's human counterpart is one of main character in the Equestria Girls spin-off franchise. She is a shy student of Canterlot High School and an animal shelter volunteer. Beginning with the second film, she is the tambourinist of her friends' rock band, the Rainbooms, and gains the ability to talk to animals as her geode power in the fourth film.

== Development ==
Faust's sketch of Fluttershy for the FiM pitch bible in 2008, where she was originally depicted as an earth pony named Posey.

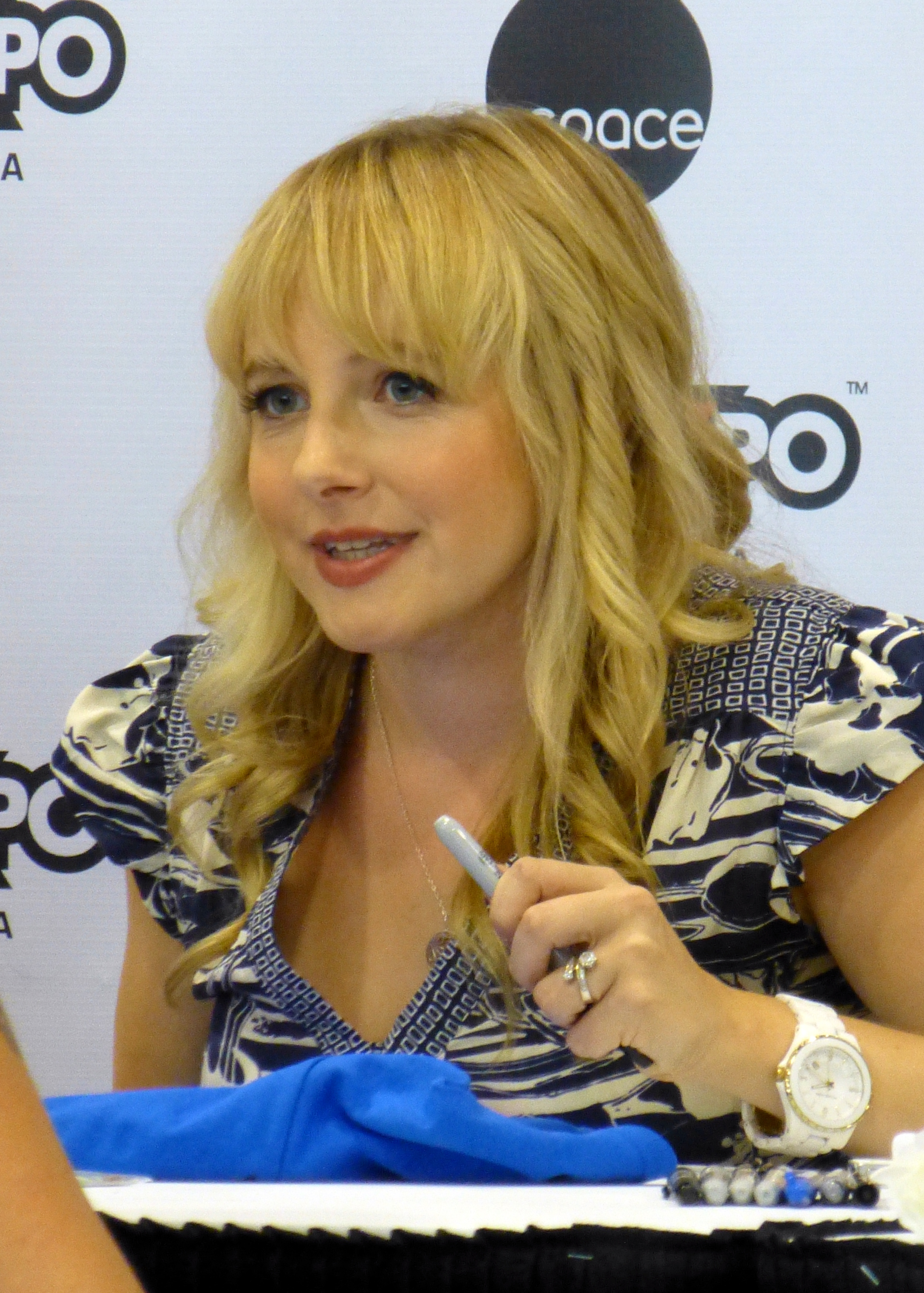
Andrea Libman provided the voice of Fluttershy.

Fluttershy was inspired by Generation 1 pony Posey, as can be seen through both her colour scheme and her caring, nature-loving personality. Fluttershy's name was taken from a Generation 3 pony first introduced in 2003.

Faust enjoyed writing for Fluttershy the most out of the show's characters due to her "relatable" struggles with fear, which Faust says brings potential "not just for great storytelling but [also for] great filmmaking".

== Reception and analysis ==
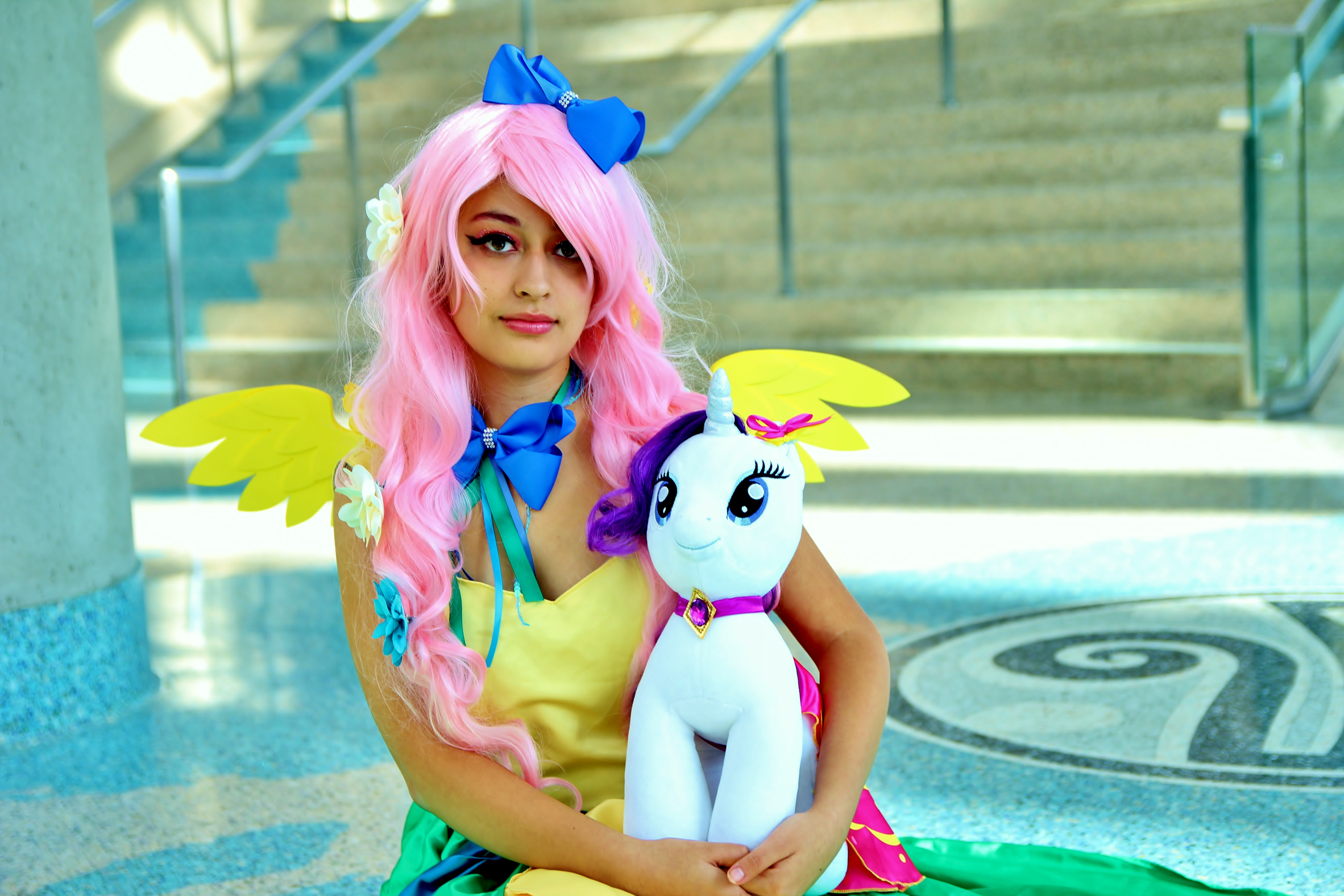
A cosplayer in a Fluttershy costume holding a Rarity plushie

In 2021, researchers from Trisakti University analyzed visual character design in My Little Pony: The Movie and noted that Fluttershy's design symbolizes warmth while simultaneously conveying shyness and introversion; her long, flowing pink mane emphasizes her femininity and nurturing nature.

== In popular culture ==
Fluttershy is a popular character in merchandise and collectibles, with items like the Kotobukiya Bishoujo statue series featuring humanized versions of her character. In September 2023, she was one of the four Friendship Is Magic characters included in the Magic: The Gathering charity Secret Lair collection "Ponies: The Galloping 2", alongside Applejack, Pinkie Pie, and Rainbow Dash. This special card collection benefited the Extra Life charity program, with half of the proceeds going to the Seattle Children's Autism Center. Fluttershy's card features unique mechanics that allowed players to immobilize creatures as long as the player is looking directly at the card (a reference to "The Stare").

== See also ==
- List of My Little Pony: Friendship Is Magic characters
- Discord
- My Little Pony: Friendship Is Magic fandom
