= List of My Little Pony: Friendship Is Magic home video releases =

My Little Pony: Friendship Is Magic is animated children's television series created by Lauren Faust and based on the fourth incarnation of Hasbro's My Little Pony toyline and media franchise. The show follows a studious anthropomorphic unicorn (later an alicorn) pony named Twilight Sparkle (Tara Strong) and her friends Applejack (Ashleigh Ball), Rarity (Tabitha St. Germain), Fluttershy (Andrea Libman), Rainbow Dash (Ball), and Pinkie Pie (Libman), and dragon assistant, Spike (Cathy Weseluck), who travel on adventures and help others around Equestria while working out problems that arise in their own friendships.

Numerous home video releases have been distributed. Shout! Factory has the DVD publishing rights for the series within Region 1. 23 five-episode DVDs and three six-episode DVDs have been released to date. The first seven seasons of the series have been released in complete DVD box sets. United Kingdom-based Clear Vision has the publishing rights for the first two seasons throughout Region 2, including most of Western Europe and the Middle East; however, the company abruptly entered administration in December 2013. Madman Entertainment has the license for publishing the series via DVDs and digital downloads in Region 4.

== Region 1 (DVD) ==
Region 1 (DVD) home video releases
Title	Release Date	Episodes	Audio tracks	Additional Features
The Friendship Express	February 28, 2012	"Friendship Is Magic" (season 1, episodes 1 and 2); "Over a Barrel" (season 1, episode 21); "Hearth's Warming Eve" (season 2, episode 11); "The Last Roundup" (season 2, episode 14)	DD 2.0: English	—N/a
Royal Pony Wedding	August 7, 2012	"The Best Night Ever" (season 1, episode 26); "Sweet and Elite" (season 2, episode 9); "Hearts and Hooves Day" (season 2, episode 17); "A Canterlot Wedding" (season 2, episode 25 and 26)	DD 2.0: English	—N/a
Adventures in the Crystal Empire	December 4, 2012	"Sonic Rainboom" (season 1, episode 16); "Luna Eclipsed" (season 2, episode 4); "It's About Time" (season 2, episode 20); "The Crystal Empire" (season 3, episodes 1 and 2)	DD 2.0: English	—N/a
Season 1 DVD set	December 4, 2012	All Season 1 episodes	DD 2.0: English	Sing-alongs; Coloring sheets; Audio commentaries
Pinkie Pie Party	January 29, 2013	"Feeling Pinkie Keen" (season 1, episode 15); "Party of One" (season 1, episode 25); "Baby Cakes" (season 2, episode 13); "A Friend in Deed" (season 2, episode 18); "Too Many Pinkie Pies" (season 3, episode 3)	DD 2.0: English	—N/a
Princess Twilight Sparkle	April 30, 2013	"Lesson Zero" (season 2, episode 3); "MMMystery on the Friendship Express" (season 2, episode 24); "Magic Duel" (season 3, episode 5); "Games Ponies Play" (season 3, episode 12); "Magical Mystery Cure" (season 3, episode 13)	DD 5.1: English	Sing-along; Coloring sheet
Season 2 DVD set	May 14, 2013	All Season 2 episodes	DD 5.1: English	"A Hearth's Warming Eve" live stage reading; My Little Pony: Friendship Is Magic panel from San Diego Comic-Con 2012; Sing-alongs; Coloring sheets
A Pony for Every Season	November 19, 2013	"Look Before You Sleep" (season 1, episode 8); "Winter Wrap Up" (season 1, episode 11); "Too Many Pinkie Pies" (season 3, episode 3); "Wonderbolts Academy" (season 3, episode 7); "Apple Family Reunion" (season 3, episode 8); "Keep Calm and Flutter On" (season 3, episode 10)	DD 5.1: English	Sing-along
Season 3 DVD set	February 4, 2014	All Season 3 episodes	DD 5.1: English	San Diego Comic-Con 2013 Panel; Sing-along; Printable Equestria map
A Dash of Awesome	March 25, 2014	"May the Best Pet Win!" (season 2, episode 7); "The Mysterious Mare Do Well" (season 2, episode 8); "Read It and Weep" (season 2, episode 16); "Daring Don't" (season 4, episode 4); "Rainbow Falls" (season 4, episode 10)	DD 5.1: English	Sing-along
The Keys of Friendship	July 29, 2014	"Rarity Takes Manehattan" (season 4, episode 8); "Pinkie Apple Pie" (season 4, episode 9); "It Ain't Easy Being Breezies" (season 4, episode 16); "Twilight's Kingdom" (season 4, episodes 25 and 26)	DD 5.1: English	Sing-along
Spooktacular Pony Tales	September 9, 2014	"Boast Busters" (season 1, episode 6); "Stare Master" (season 1, episode 17); "Luna Eclipsed" (season 2, episode 4); "Sleepless in Ponyville" (season 3, episode 6); "Castle Mane-ia" (season 4, episode 3); "Bats!" (season 4, episode 7)	DD 5.1: English	Sing-along
Season 4 DVD set	December 2, 2014	All Season 4 episodes	DD 5.1: English	San Diego Comic-Con 2014 Panel; Sing-alongs
Adventures of the Cutie Mark Crusaders	February 24, 2015	"The Cutie Mark Chronicles" (season 1, episode 23); "The Cutie Pox" (season 2, episode 6); "Flight to the Finish" (season 4, episode 5); "Pinkie Pride" (season 4, episode 12); "Twilight Time" (season 4, episode 15)	DD 5.1: English	Sing-along; Downloadable Wallpapers
Cutie Mark Quests	June 30, 2015	"The Show Stoppers" (season 1, episode 18); "The Return of Harmony" (season 2, episodes 1 and 2); "The Cutie Map" (season 5, episodes 1 and 2)	DD 5.1: English	Sing-along
Games Ponies Play	September 29, 2015	"Fall Weather Friends" (season 1, episode 13); "Games Ponies Play" (season 3, episode 12); "Power Ponies" (season 4, episode 6); "Equestria Games" (season 4, episode 24); "Appleoosa's Most Wanted" (season 5, episode 6); "The Lost Treasure of Griffonstone" (season 5, episode 8)	DD 5.1: English	—N/a
Friends Across Equestria	March 1, 2016	"Make New Friends but Keep Discord" (season 5, episode 7); "Slice of Life" (season 5, episode 9); "Amending Fences" (season 5, episode 12); "Made in Manehattan" (season 5, episode 16); "The Mane Attraction" (season 5, episode 24)	DD 5.1: English	Sing-along
Friends and Family	June 7, 2016	"One Bad Apple" (season 3, episode 4); "Maud Pie" (season 4, episode 18); "Hearthbreakers" (season 5, episode 20); "Brotherhooves Social" (season 5, episode 17); "The Gift of the Maud Pie" (season 6, episode 3)	DD 5.1: English	—N/a
Season 5 DVD set	July 12, 2016	All Season 5 episodes	DD 5.1: English	Recording of the 2015 San Diego Comic-Con Pony Panel; Sing-alongs
Soarin' Over Equestria	August 2, 2016	"Griffon the Brush-Off" (season 1, episode 5); "Hurricane Fluttershy" (season 2, episode 22); "Testing Testing 1, 2, 3" (season 4, episode 21); "On Your Marks" (season 6, episode 4); "Newbie Dash" (season 6, episode 7)	DD 5.1: English	—N/a
Everypony's Favorite Frights	August 30, 2016	"Bridle Gossip" (season 1, episode 9); "Owl's Well That Ends Well" (season 1, episode 24); "Do Princesses Dream of Magic Sheep?" (season 5, episode 13); "Scare Master" (season 5, episode 21); "Gauntlet of Fire" (season 6, episode 5)	DD 5.1: English	—N/a
Exploring the Crystal Empire	February 7, 2017	"The Cutie Re-Mark" (season 5, episodes 25 and 26); "The Crystalling" (season 6, episodes 1 and 2); "The Times They Are a Changeling" (season 6, episode 16)	DD 5.1: English	—N/a
Twilight and Starlight	May 30, 2017	"No Second Prances" (season 6, episode 6); "To Where and Back Again" (season 6, episodes 25 and 26); "Celestial Advice" (season 7, episode 1); "All Bottled Up" (season 7, episode 2)	DD 5.1: English	—N/a
Fluttershy	September 12, 2017	"Green Isn't Your Color" (season 1, episode 20); "Flutter Brutter" (season 6, episode 11); "Buckball Season" (season 6, episode 18); "Viva Las Pegasus" (season 6, episode 20); "Fluttershy Leans In" (season 7, episode 5)	DD 5.1: English	—N/a
Holiday Hearts	October 3, 2017	"Winter Wrap Up" (season 1, episode 11); "Castle Sweet Castle" (season 5, episode 3); "Hearthbreakers" (season 5, episode 20); "A Hearth's Warming Tail" (season 6, episode 8); "Not Asking for Trouble" (season 7, episode 11)	DD 5.1: English	Sing-along
Season 6 DVD set	November 7, 2017	All Season 6 episodes	DD 5.1: English	Recording of the 2016 San Diego Comic-Con Pony Panel; Sing-alongs
Spring Into Friendship	February 13, 2018	"The Ticket Master" (season 1, episode 3); "Sisterhooves Social" (season 2, episode 5); "Just for Sidekicks" (season 3, episode 11); "Princess Twilight Sparkle" (season 4, episodes 1 and 2)	DD 5.1: English	Sing-along
Applejack	May 8, 2018	"Leap of Faith" (season 4, episode 20); "Applejack's "Day" Off" (season 6, episode 10); "The Cart Before the Ponies" (season 6, episode 14); "P.P.O.V. (Pony Point of View)" (season 6, episode 22); "Where the Apple Lies" (season 6, episode 23)	DD 5.1: English	Sing-along
Rarity	July 17, 2018	"Suited for Success" (season 1, episode 14); "A Dog and Pony Show" (season 1, episode 19); "Rarity Investigates!" (season 5, episode 15); "Forever Filly" (season 7, episode 6); "It Isn't the Mane Thing About You" (season 7, episode 19)	DD 5.1: English	—N/a
Pony Trick or Treat	September 4, 2018	"28 Pranks Later" (season 6, episode 15); "Campfire Tales" (season 7, episode 16); "To Change a Changeling" (season 7, episode 17); "Shadow Play" (season 7, episode 25 and 26)	DD 5.1: English	—N/a
Season 7 DVD set	October 9, 2018	All Season 7 episodes	DD 5.1: English	2018 San Diego Comic-Con Panel; Sing-alongs
Hearts and Hooves	January 1, 2019	"Simple Ways" (season 4, episode 13); "Hard to Say Anything" (season 7, episode 8); "The Perfect Pear" (season 7, episode 13); "The Maud Couple" (season 8, episode 3); "The Break Up Break Down" (season 8, episode 10)	DD 5.1: English	Sing-alongs

== Region 2 (DVD) ==
Region 2 (DVD) home video releases
Title	Release Date	Episodes	Audio tracks	Publisher
Welcome to Ponyville	September 2, 2013		DD 5.1: English; DD 5.1: French; DD 5.1: Italian; DD 2.0: Arabic; DD 2.0: Spanish	Clear Vision
Część 1	September 13, 2013		DD 2.0: Polish	Galapagos Films
Część 2	September 13, 2013		DD 2.0: Polish	Galapagos Films
Call of the Cutie	October 14, 2013		DD 5.1: English; DD 5.1: French; DD 5.1: Italian; DD 2.0: Arabic; DD 2.0: Spanish	Clear Vision
Część 3	October 24, 2013		DD 2.0: Polish	Galapagos Films
A Pony Party	February 17, 2014		DD 5.1: English; DD 5.1: French; DD 5.1: Italian; DD 2.0: Arabic; DD 2.0: Spanish	Clear Vision
Część 4	February 21, 2014		DD 2.0: Polish	Galapagos Films
Część 5	March 21, 2014		DD 2.0: Polish	Galapagos Films
Część 6	April 11, 2014		DD 2.0: Polish	Galapagos Films
Część 7	May 23, 2014		DD 2.0: Polish	Galapagos Films
Część 8	June 6, 2014		DD 2.0: Polish	Galapagos Films
Część 9	August 29, 2014		DD 2.0: Polish	Galapagos Films
Część 10	September 26, 2014		DD 2.0: Polish	Galapagos Films
Sonic Rainboom/Green Isn't Your Colour	October 6, 2014		DD 5.1: English; DD 5.1: French; DD 5.1: Italian; DD 2.0: Arabic; DD 2.0: Spanish	Primal Screen
The Complete Season One	November 3, 2014		DD 5.1: English; DD 5.1: French; DD 5.1: Italian; DD 2.0: Arabic; DD 2.0: Spanish	Primal Screen
Kompletny Pierwszy Sezon	November 7, 2014		DD 2.0: Polish	Galapagos Films
Kompletny Drugi Sezon	November 21, 2014		DD 2.0: Polish	Galapagos Films
Return of Harmony	January 12, 2015		DD 5.1: English; DD 5.1: French; DD 5.1: Italian; DD 2.0: Arabic; DD 2.0: Spanish	Primal Screen
May the Best Pet Win!	February 16, 2015		DD 5.1: English; DD 5.1: French; DD 5.1: Italian; DD 2.0: Arabic; DD 2.0: Spanish	Primal Screen
Baby Cakes	May 25, 2015		DD 5.1: English; DD 5.1: French; DD 5.1: Italian; DD 2.0: Arabic; DD 2.0: Spanish	Primal Screen
Das Kristall-Königreich	June 25, 2015		DD 5.1: German	Primal Screen
Putting Your Hoof Down	July 6, 2015		DD 5.1: English; DD 5.1: French; DD 5.1: Italian; DD 2.0: Arabic; DD 2.0: Spanish	Primal Screen
A Canterlot Wedding	August 17, 2015		DD 5.1: English; DD 5.1: French; DD 5.1: Italian; DD 2.0: Arabic; DD 2.0: Spanish	Primal Screen
Die Equestria-Spiele	August 27, 2015		DD 5.1: German	Primal Screen
The Complete Season Two	October 26, 2015		DD 5.1: English; DD 5.1: French; DD 5.1: Italian; DD 2.0: Arabic; DD 2.0: Spanish	Primal Screen
Die Komplette Staffel 3	November 12, 2015		DD 5.1: German	Primal Screen
Część 11	November 27, 2015		DD 2.0: Polish	Galapagos Films
Część 12	November 27, 2015		DD 2.0: Polish	Galapagos Films
The Crystal Empire	January 18, 2016		DD 5.1: English; DD 5.1: French; DD 5.1: Italian; DD 2.0: Arabic; DD 2.0: German	Primal Screen
Część 13	February 5, 2016		DD 2.0: Polish	Galapagos Films
Prinzessin Twilight Sparkle	February 25, 2016		DD 2.0: German	Primal Screen
Games Ponies Play	March 14, 2016		DD 5.1: English; DD 5.1: French; DD 5.1: Italian; DD 2.0: Arabic; DD 2.0: German	Primal Screen
Kompletny Trzeci Sezon	May 4, 2016		DD 2.0: Polish	Galapagos Films
Princess Twilight Sparkle	May 9, 2016		DD 5.1: English; DD 5.1: French; DD 5.1: Italian; DD 2.0: Arabic; DD 2.0: German	Primal Screen
Rarity in Mähnhattan	June 23, 2016		DD 2.0: German	Primal Screen
Część 14	January 11, 2017		DD 2.0: Polish	Galapagos Films
Część 15	January 11, 2017		DD 2.0: Polish	Galapagos Films
Część 16	May 10, 2017		DD 2.0: Polish	Galapagos Films
Część 17	May 10, 2017		DD 2.0: Polish	Galapagos Films
Część 18	August 16, 2017		DD 2.0: Polish	Galapagos Films
Część 19	August 16, 2017		DD 2.0: Polish	Galapagos Films
Rarity Takes Manehattan	October 2, 2017		DD 2.0: English	Miracle Media
The Complete Season Three	October 9, 2017		DD 5.1: English; DD 5.1: French; DD 5.1: Italian; DD 2.0: Arabic; DD 2.0: German	Miracle Media
Część 20	October 11, 2017		DD 2.0: Polish	Galapagos Films
Część 21	October 11, 2017		DD 2.0: Polish	Galapagos Films
Maud Pie	January 8, 2018		DD 2.0: English	Miracle Media
Twilight's Kingdom	April 2, 2018		DD 2.0: English	Miracle Media
Część 22	November 14, 2018		DD 2.0: Polish	Galapagos Films
The Complete Season Five	March 25, 2019		DD 2.0: English	Miracle Media
Die Komplette 5. Staffel	April 17, 2019		DD 5.1: English; DD 5.1: German	EuroVideo
Die Komplette 6. Staffel	April 17, 2019		DD 5.1: English; DD 5.1: German	EuroVideo
The Complete Season Six	May 27, 2019		DD 2.0: English	Miracle Media
The Complete Season Seven	September 9, 2019		DD 2.0: English	Miracle Media

== Region 4 (DVD) ==
Region 4 (DVD) home video releases
Title	Release date	Episodes	Audio tracks	Publisher
Friendship Changes Everything	June 20, 2012	"Friendship Is Magic" (season 1, episodes 1 and 2); "The Ticket Master" (season 1, episode 3); "Applebuck Season" (season 1, episode 4); "Griffon the Brush-Off" (season 1, episode 5)	DD 5.1: English; DD 2.0: English	Madman Entertainment
That's What Friends Are For	June 20, 2012	"Boast Busters" (season 1, episode 6); "Dragonshy" (season 1, episode 7); "Look Before You Sleep (season 1, episode 8); "Bridle Gossip" (season 1, episode 9); "Swarm of the Century" (season 1, episode 10)	DD 5.1: English; DD 2.0: English	Madman Entertainment
Four Seasons of Friendship	August 1, 2012	"Winter Wrap Up" (season 1, episode 11); "Call of the Cutie" (season 1, episode 12); "Fall Weather Friends" (season 1, episode 13); "Suited for Success" (season 1, episode 14); "Feeling Pinkie Keen" (season 1, episode 15)	DD 5.1: English; DD 2.0: English	Madman Entertainment
Fun, Games & Friendship	October 10, 2012	"Sonic Rainboom" (season 1, episode 16); "The Stare Master" (season 1, episode 17); "The Show Stoppers" (season 1, episode 18); "A Dog and Pony Show" (season 1, episode 19); "Green Isn't Your Color" (season 1, episode 20)	DD 5.1: English; DD 2.0: English	Madman Entertainment
Best Friends Forever	December 5, 2012	"Over a Barrel" (season 1, episode 21); "A Bird in the Hoof" (season 1, episode 22); "The Cutie Mark Chronicles" (season 1, episode 23); "Owl's Well That Ends Well" (season 1, episode 24); "Party of One" (season 1, episode 25); "The Best Night Ever" (season 1, episode 26)	DD 5.1: English; DD 2.0: English	Madman Entertainment
Season 1 Boxset	June 19, 2013	All season 1 episodes	DD 5.1: English; DD 2.0: English	Madman Entertainment
The Return of Harmony	June 19, 2013	"The Return of Harmony" (season 2, episode 1 and 2); "Lesson Zero" (season 2, episode 3); "Luna Eclipsed" (season 2, episode 4); "Sisterhooves Social" (season 2, episode 5)	DD 5.1: English; DD 2.0: English	Madman Entertainment
Parties & Pets	July 3, 2013	"The Cutie Pox" (season 2, episode 6); "May the Best Pet Win!" (season 2, episode 7); "The Mysterious Mare Do Well" (season 2, episode 8); "Sweet and Elite" (season 2, episode 9); "Secret of My Excess" (season 2, episode 10)	DD 5.1: English; DD 2.0: English	Madman Entertainment
Friendship to the Rescue	October 2, 2013	"Hearth's Warming Eve" (season 2, episode 11); "Family Appreciation Day" (season 2, episode 12); "Baby Cakes" (season 2, episode 13); "The Last Roundup" (season 2, episode 14); "The Super Speedy Cider Squeezy 6000" (season 2, episode 15)	DD 5.1: English; DD 2.0: English	Madman Entertainment
Helping Out Friends	November 6, 2013	"Read It and Weep" (season 2, episode 16); "Hearts and Hooves Day" (season 2, episode 17); "A Friend in Deed" (season 2, episode 18); "Putting Your Hoof Down" (season 2, episode 19); "It's About Time" (season 2, episode 20)	DD 5.1: English; DD 2.0: English	Madman Entertainment
Royal Pony Wedding	December 4, 2013	"Dragon Quest" (season 2, episode 21); "Hurricane Fluttershy" (season 2, episode 22); "Ponyville Confidential" (season 2, episode 23); "MMMystery on the Friendship Express" (season 2, episode 24); "A Canterlot Wedding" (season 2, episode 25 and 26)	DD 5.1: English; DD 2.0: English	Madman Entertainment
The Crystal Empire	June 4, 2014	TBA	DD 5.1: English	Madman Entertainment
Ponies on the Move	September 17, 2014	TBA	DD 5.1: English	Madman Entertainment
Pinkie Pie Party Time	January 7, 2015	"Sweet and Elite" (season 2, episode 9); "Hearth's Warming Eve" (season 2, episode 11); "Baby Cakes" (season 2, episode 13); "A Friend in Deed" season 2, episode 18)	DD 5.1: English; DD 2.0: English	Madman Entertainment
A Pony's Destiny	February 4, 2015	TBA	DD 5.1: English	Madman Entertainment
Princess Twilight Sparkle	March 2, 2015	TBA	DD 2.0: English	Beyond Home Entertainment
It's an Applejack Hoedown	April 1, 2015	TBA		Madman Entertainment
Sparkle and Shine Collection	April 1, 2015	TBA		Madman Entertainment
Season 2 Collection	May 6, 2015	TBA	DD 5.1: English; DD 2.0: English	Madman Entertainment
Up and Away with Rainbow Dash	May 6, 2015	TBA		Madman Entertainment
Pinkie Apple Pie	June 2, 2015	TBA	DD 2.0: English	Beyond Home Entertainment
It Ain't Easy Being Breezies	June 3, 2015	TBA	DD 2.0: English	Beyond Home Entertainment
Lights, Camera, Rarity!	June 24, 2015	TBA		Madman Entertainment
All a Fluttershy	July 8, 2015	TBA		Madman Entertainment
Season 4 Complete Collection	September 1, 2015	TBA	DD 2.0: English	Beyond Home Entertainment
Equestria Games	September 1, 2015	TBA	DD 2.0: English	Beyond Home Entertainment
Sparkle Beyond Belief!	September 16, 2015	TBA		Madman Entertainment
Season 3 Collection	December 2, 2015	All season 3 episodes	DD 5.1: English	Madman Entertainment
The Cutie Map	February 3, 2016	TBA	DD 2.0: English	Beyond Home Entertainment
Princess Spike	June 1, 2016	TBA	DD 2.0: English	Beyond Home Entertainment
Canterlot Boutique	September 1, 2016	TBA	DD 2.0: English	Beyond Home Entertainment
The Mane Attraction	November 2, 2016	TBA	DD 2.0: English	Beyond Home Entertainment
The Crystal Empire	February 1, 2017	TBA	DD 2.0: English	Beyond Home Entertainment
Spice Up Your Life	June 7, 2017	TBA	DD 2.0: English	Beyond Home Entertainment
Viva Las Pegasus	August 30, 2017	TBA	DD 2.0: English	Beyond Home Entertainment
Where the Apple Lies	December 6, 2017	TBA	DD 2.0: English	Beyond Home Entertainment
Rock Solid Friendship	March 7, 2018	TBA	DD 2.0: English	Beyond Home Entertainment
A Royal Problem	June 6, 2018	TBA	DD 2.0: English	Beyond Home Entertainment
Campfire Tales	August 28, 2018	TBA	DD 2.0: English	Beyond Home Entertainment
Shadow Play	October 3, 2018	TBA	DD 2.0: English	Beyond Home Entertainment
School Daze	January 2, 2019	TBA	DD 2.0: English	Beyond Home Entertainment
Horse Play	March 6, 2019	TBA	DD 2.0: English	Beyond Home Entertainment
Friendship University	June 5, 2019	TBA	DD 2.0: English	Beyond Home Entertainment
What Lies Beneath	August 7, 2019	TBA	DD 2.0: English	Beyond Home Entertainment

== Worldwide (Blu-ray) ==
Worldwide (Blu-ray) home video releases
Title	Release date	Episodes	Audio tracks	Additional features	Notes
Die komplette 1. Staffel	March 29, 2012	All Season 1 episodes	DTS-HD MA 5.1: German; DTS-HD MA 2.0: English; DTS-HD MA 2.0: German		
Die komplette 2. Staffel	December 10, 2014	All Season 2 episodes	DTS-HD MA 5.1: German; PCM 2.0: English; PCM 2.0: German		Pitch shifted by (24000/1001)/25
