= Dragon Quest (My Little Pony: Friendship Is Magic) =

- My Little Pony: Friendship Is Magic episode
- Spike watches the great dragon migration.
- Episode no.: Season 2 Episode 21
- Written by: Merriwether Williams
- Original air date: March 17, 2012
- Running time: 22 minutes

Episode chronology
← Previous "It's About Time"	Next → "Hurricane Fluttershy"
- My Little Pony: Friendship Is Magic season 2

"Dragon Quest" is the twenty-first episode of the second season of the animated television series My Little Pony: Friendship Is Magic. The episode was written by Merriwether Williams. It originally aired on The Hub on March 17, 2012. In this episode, Spike observes the great dragon migration and begins questioning his dragon identity.

== Plot ==
External videos
- Dragon Quest (full episode) — Official upload of the episode onto YouTube

The Mane Six and an eager Spike gather to witness the spectacular great dragon migration. His enthusiasm deflates when Rainbow Dash casually dismisses him as a "lame dragon," and though the other ponies defend him, their well-meaning comments only deepen his embarrassment about his small stature and gentle nature. That night, Spike lies awake troubled by questions about his origins and identity, realizing that despite living among ponies his entire life, he knows nothing about dragon culture or where he truly belongs.

The next morning, Spike announces his intention to join the migration and learn how to be an authentic dragon. Though Twilight supports his decision, she secretly follows him along with Rainbow Dash and Rarity, who disguise themselves as a single large dragon to avoid detection. Spike eventually catches up with a group of teenage dragons in a volcanic region, where their leader Garble immediately begins mocking his diminutive size and lack of wings and asks whether he qualifies as a real dragon at all.

The teenage dragons subject Spike to a series of initiation challenges like violent wrestling matches and dangerous lava pool competitions. Spike performs poorly in most events but accidentally impresses the group with his pain tolerance after an especially painful belly flop into molten rock. The dragons accept him as a "rookie" member and celebrate with a raucous party where Spike gorges himself on gems. Garble invites Spike to participate in a raid on a phoenix nest to steal its eggs, a mission that requires him to distract the parent birds while the others loot their home. Though initially reluctant, Spike follows through with the plan but discovers a single unhatched egg that the other dragons demand he destroy as proof of his commitment to their group. When he refuses to smash the egg, Garble turns violent, which forces Twilight, Rarity, and Rainbow Dash to abandon their disguise and help Spike escape to safety.

Back in Ponyville, Spike reflects on his experience and writes to Princess Celestia about learning the difference between what he is biologically and who he chooses to be as an individual. The phoenix egg Spike rescued hatches into a baby bird that he names Peewee.

== Reception ==
Sherilyn Connelly, the author of Ponyville Confidential, gave the episode a "B" rating. In her review of the episode in SF Weekly, Connelly observed that Spike's refusal to smash the phoenix egg stemmed from his personal connection to the situation, noting that "he was once an abandoned egg, too", who was later taken in by Twilight Sparkle and her family.

In a critical analysis of the episode, author Jen A. Blue argued that unlike "The Mysterious Mare Do Well", which unintentionally depicted flaws in gender socialization, "Dragon Quest" appears to address these issues deliberately. Blue analyzed the dragons as representing "the masculine counterpart to the matriarchal society of Equestria" and explored the possibility of a transgender reading of Spike's story; Blue wrote that he possesses stereotypically feminine traits yet chooses to define himself through his own sense of identity rather than conforming to physical expectations. She examined the dragons' King of the Hoard game as "one of the most perfect depictions of hegemonic masculinity" she had ever seen. Blue interpreted it as a demonstration of power-based masculinity where dragons fight over treasure that ultimately goes unclaimed. Blue distinguished between power and freedom, arguing that the dragons' destruction of phoenix eggs represents the ultimate expression of power because it eliminates choices entirely, while creation represents the ultimate expression of freedom. She concluded that Spike rejects the power-driven dragon culture and "more than any character we have seen before, more even than the Cutie Mark Crusaders, is a brony."

Alesha Davis, in a retrospective review for The Post, criticized the episode for its portrayal of fantasy racism, arguing that the ponies treat Spike as separate from other dragons in a way that resembles real-world prejudice toward minorities. Davis analyzed the episode as "accidentally representing the struggle of a kid who is a minority attempting to reconnect with their cultural heritage when they've been raised in an all-white space." Davis commented that while the ponies often treat dragons like rabid animals, the dragons themselves demonstrate complex social structures with rituals and values, and they accept Spike more readily than the ponies feared they would. Jamie Kingston of WomenWriteAboutComics criticized the episode for giving "the unfortunate message that Spike is better off with the ponies than he is with his own kind, because they're cruel, violent jerks," which she argued "analogues uncomfortably with white people who adopt outside their race as white saviours."

== Home media release ==
The episode was part of the Season 2 DVD set, released by Shout Factory on May 14, 2013.

== See also ==
- List of My Little Pony: Friendship Is Magic episodes
