= My Little Pony: Friendship Is Magic season 2 =

My Little Pony: Friendship Is Magic
- Season 2
- DVD cover
- No. of episodes: 26

Release
- Original network: The Hub
- Original release: September 17, 2011 – April 21, 2012

Season chronology
- ← Previous; Season 1 Next → Season 3

The second season of the animated television series My Little Pony: Friendship Is Magic, developed by Lauren Faust, originally aired on The Hub, an American pay television channel partly owned by Hasbro. The series is based on Hasbro's My Little Pony line of toys and animated works and is often referred by collectors to be the fourth generation, or "G4", of the My Little Pony franchise. Season 2 of the series premiered on September 17, 2011 and concluded on April 21, 2012.

The show follows a studious unicorn pony named Twilight Sparkle as her mentor Princess Celestia guides her to learn about friendship in the town of Ponyville. Twilight becomes close friends with five other ponies: Applejack, Rarity, Fluttershy, Rainbow Dash, and Pinkie Pie. Each represents a different face of friendship, and Twilight discovers herself to be a key part of the magical artifacts, the Elements of Harmony. The ponies share adventures and help out other residents of Ponyville, while working out the troublesome moments in their own friendships.

== Concept ==
Hasbro selected animator Lauren Faust as the creative director and executive producer for the show. Faust sought to challenge the established "girly" nature of the existing My Little Pony line, creating more in-depth characters and adventurous settings, incorporating Hasbro's suggestions for marketing of the toy line. From season 2 onward, E/I ("educational and informational") content was dropped in favor of only TV-Y, designed for ages 2 and up.

== Production ==
Lauren Faust left the show after the conclusion of the first season. She was credited in the second season as Consulting Producer. Her involvement in the second season consisted mainly of story conception and scripts, and the involvement ceased after the second season. Despite leaving, she still has high hopes for the staff members, stating that "the gaps I have left are being filled by the same amazing artists, writers, and directors who brought you Season 1. I'm certain the show will be as entertaining as ever".

== Cast ==
=== Main ===
- Tara Strong as Twilight Sparkle (speaking voice)
  - Rebecca Shoichet as Twilight Sparkle (singing voice)
- Tabitha St. Germain as Rarity (speaking voice)
  - Kazumi Evans as Rarity (singing voice)
- Ashleigh Ball as Applejack and Rainbow Dash
- Andrea Libman as Fluttershy and Pinkie Pie (speaking voice)
  - Shannon Chan-Kent as Pinkie Pie (singing voice); Libman occasionally
- Cathy Weseluck as Spike

=== Recurring ===
- Nicole Oliver as Princess Celestia and Cheerilee
- Tabitha St. Germain as Princess Luna and Granny Smith
- Peter New as Big McIntosh
- Michelle Creber as Apple Bloom
- Madeleine Peters as Scootaloo
- Claire Corlett as Sweetie Belle (speaking voice)
  - Michelle Creber as Sweetie Belle (singing voice)

=== Minor ===
- Kelly Metzger as Spitfire
- Chantal Strand as Diamond Tiara
- Shannon Chan-Kent as Silver Spoon
- Brenda Crichlow as Zecora
- Lee Tockar as Snips
- Richard Ian Cox as Snails
- Cathy Weseluck as Mayor Mare
- Brian Drummond as Mr. Cake
- Tabitha St. Germain as Mrs. Cake and Pound Cake
- Andrea Libman as Pumpkin Cake

=== Guest stars ===
- John de Lancie as Discord
- William Lawrenson as Pipsqueak
- Tabitha St. Germain as Derpy Hooves
- Trevor Devall as Fancypants and Iron Will
- Sylvia Zaradic as Cherry Jubilee
- Samuel Vincent as Flim
- Scott McNeil as Flam
- Peter New as Doctor Horse
- Chiara Zanni as Daring Do/A.K. Yearling
- Brian Drummond as Ahuizotl
- Richard Newman as Cranky Doodle Donkey
- Brenda Crichlow as Matilda
- Vincent Tong as Garble and Donut Joe
- Michael Donovan as Stallion Tourist
- Mark Oliver as Gustave le Grand
- Jan Rabson as Mulia Mild
- Andrew Francis as Shining Armor
- Britt McKillip as Princess Cadance
- Kathleen Barr as Queen Chrysalis

== Episodes ==
Each episode is directed by James Wootton.

No. overall	No. in season	Title	Written by	Original release date	Prod. code	US viewers (millions)
27	1	"The Return of Harmony" (Parts 1 & 2)	M.A. Larson	September 17, 2011	201	0.48
28	2	"The Return of Harmony" (Parts 1 & 2)	M.A. Larson	September 24, 2011	202	N/A
Part 1: Following an argument between the Cutie Marks Crusaders, Discord, a draconequus known as the spirit of chaos and disharmony, escapes from his stone imprisonment. Princess Celestia summons Twilight and her friends to use the Elements of Harmony in order to recapture him. Unfortunately, they find the Elements missing and Discord teases them with a riddle. Believing the Elements are at the center of the Canterlot garden hedge maze, Twilight leads her friends there, but Discord manipulates them by separating them in the maze and brainwashing all but Twilight into polar opposites of their usual selves, with Twilight assuming the maze has gotten to her friends and they've gone frustrated for no reason, and Rainbow Dash flying away in the belief that Cloudsdale is in trouble. Feeling triumphant, Discord thinks he has bested Twilight and continues to spread chaos all across Equestria. Part 2: Twilight leads her friends to a chaos-affected Ponyville where she recognizes the true answer to Discord's riddle and finds the Elements in the library. However, without Rainbow Dash, they fail to work and Twilight is finally broken by Discord's spell. As she packs to leave Ponyville, Spike coughs up letters from Princess Celestia which are all of Twilight's old friendship reports. After reading them, Twilight's lifted spirits break Discord's spell on her and she uses it to return her friends to normal, including Rainbow Dash. They successfully turn Discord back into stone using the Elements and are welcomed by Celestia as heroes for defeating him.
29	3	"Lesson Zero"	Meghan McCarthy	October 15, 2011	203	N/A
Twilight realizes she has until sunset to write her weekly friendship report to Princess Celestia and worries she will face terrible punishment if she is late. Spike and her friends dismiss her fears but she refuses to listen. After failing to find anypony in Ponyville with a friendship problem, she decides to cause one herself using an old doll infused with a spell to make the Cutie Mark Crusaders fight over it so that she can break up the fight. However, the fight gets out of control and the influence of the doll spreads across Ponyville. As the sun sets, Celestia arrives to reverse the spell. Fearing the worst, Twilight is relieved when Celestia says she would not have to punish her in any way, revealing Spike told her about Twilight's anxiety, and decrees that Twilight, or any of her friends, only have to send friendship reports when they have something to write about.
30	4	"Luna Eclipsed"	M.A. Larson	October 22, 2011	204	N/A
Princess Luna, who had been saved by Twilight and her friends from her evil alter ego, Nightmare Moon, visits Ponyville on the festival of Nightmare Night, which centers around Nightmare Moon. The townsfolk all panic at her appearance and outdated mannerisms, but Twilight helps her to acclimate to the festival. Despite this, Pinkie Pie and several foals still run away at her approach, angering her into threatening to cancel the celebration forever. Twilight learns from Pinkie that she is just having fun being scared, so she uses this to show Luna that the foals love her but want to have fun being scared on that night. Heartened by this revelation, Luna happily joins in the rest of the festival.
31	5	"Sisterhooves Social"	Cindy Morrow	November 5, 2011	205	N/A
Sweetie Belle is staying with Rarity while their parents are on vacation. Not used to Rarity's work, Sweetie Belle gets in the way and ruins Rarity's efforts. When Apple Bloom tells Sweetie Belle about the upcoming Sisterhooves Social race, she tries to get Rarity to participate, but she refuses. Sweetie Belle then angrily declares that Rarity is no longer her sister, and goes to stay with Apple Bloom and Applejack, considering her to be a better sister. Rarity realizes her selfishness and works out a plan with Applejack and Apple Bloom for the social. At the race, Rarity switches places with Applejack using a mud pit. When Sweetie Belle finds out that Rarity actually raced with her, she is overjoyed and they make up.
32	6	"The Cutie Pox"	Amy Keating Rogers	November 12, 2011	206	N/A
After the Cutie Mark Crusaders failed to get their cutie marks in bowling, Apple Bloom dejectedly wanders into the Everfree Forest. But when she trips over and chips her tooth, Zecora takes Apple Bloom to her house to get it fixed. Apple Bloom finds a "Heart's Desire" flower which can make "talent come into view". While she believes it could help her finally discover her special talent, Apple Bloom instead becomes afflicted with the Cutie Pox, an ailment that causes various cutie marks to appear on her body, and forcing her to continually perform the talents they represent. Zecora arrives to find where her Heart's Desire went, and upon seeing Apple Bloom, provides her with the cure after Apple Bloom admits to taking the flower. Apple Bloom apologizes and realizes she cannot rush finding her talent.
33	7	"May the Best Pet Win!"	Charlotte Fullerton	November 19, 2011	207	N/A
After seeing the rest of her friends out in the park on a playdate with their pets, Rainbow Dash, with the help of Fluttershy, tries to find herself an animal to be her pet using a series of contests. However, Fluttershy insists that a tortoise should compete in the competition as well. After a series of events, Rainbow Dash challenges the four flying finalists to a race through Ghastly Gorge, so whichever one crosses the finish line with her will be her new pet. In the race, Rainbow Dash's wing is caught under a rock, but the tortoise, who had continued to race, arrives to help free and take her to the finish line. Rainbow Dash is proud to call the tortoise her new pet and names him Tank due to his tenacity.
34	8	"The Mysterious Mare Do Well"	Merriwether Williams	November 26, 2011	208	N/A
After saving ponies in dangers several times, Rainbow Dash becomes a hero around Ponyville, but she lets the publicity go to her head, and her friends become concerned. Later, Rainbow Dash finds that she is being upstaged by a masked hero, Mare Do Well, who appears to be a winged unicorn. Angered by the competition, Rainbow Dash chases Mare Do Well only to discover that all of her friends had a role in playing Mare Do Well. They had worked out this plan to help show Rainbow Dash the dangers of letting praise go to one's head, and she thanks them for revealing her folly.
35	9	"Sweet and Elite"	Meghan McCarthy	December 3, 2011	209	N/A
Rarity is in Canterlot to design a dress for Twilight's upcoming birthday. When members of the elite class snub her Ponyville background, she is convinced that she can demonstrate high fashion. She runs into another upper-class unicorn, Fancy Pants, who invites her to a high class event. This soon builds too many more invitations to other fancy events for Rarity, leaving her torn between attending the events or finishing the half-completed dress. She decides to stay in Canterlot to mingle with the upper class and is surprised when Twilight and her friends arrive and have moved the birthday party to Canterlot. At Twilight's party, Rarity attempts to sneak out to a fancy garden party next door, but when her friends discover this, they support her networking for her business and decide to join the party as well. The socialites are initially shocked by their behavior, but Rarity stands up for her friends. Fancy Pants finds her friends "charmingly rustic" and compliments Rarity on Twilight's simple dress, assuring her more orders from the other upper class.
36	10	"Secret of My Excess"	M.A. Larson	December 10, 2011	210	N/A
Spike celebrates his first birthday in Ponyville, and is surprised at the number of gifts he has received from his new friends. However, this triggers a hoarding instinct in him, and the next day, Twilight is shocked to find that he has grown larger. Twilight learns that as a dragon becomes more greedy, it will grow to larger and larger sizes. Spike's greed soon runs out of control, and as a giant dragon, he kidnaps Rarity and climbs a nearby mountain. When Spike sees Rarity wearing a fire ruby gemstone, he remembers when he had willingly given it to Rarity before his birthday. The generous thoughts reverse his growth, returning him to normal. Despite the damage his rampage has done to Ponyville, Rarity still thinks of Spike as the most generous dragon she knows.
37	11	"Hearth's Warming Eve"	Merriwether Williams	December 17, 2011	213	N/A
Twilight and her friends are asked by Princess Celestia to be the principal actresses in a holiday pageant on the origins of Hearth's Warming Eve. The play shows that before Celestia's rule, the three races of ponies did not live in harmony. When a severe winter ruins most of the food, the three leaders and their assistants set off to find a new land untouched by winter. By chance, they all come to the same spot and the leaders start bickering again. The hostility feeds the ghostly Windigos, the creatures responsible for the winter, causing the land and the leaders to freeze over. The assistants find that they share a common bond and their friendship creates a great fire that vanquishes the Windigos and thaws out the land and their leaders. Putting their differences aside, the three tribes name the new land Equestria and work together to make it thrive.
38	12	"Family Appreciation Day"	Cindy Morrow	January 7, 2012	211	N/A
Apple Bloom is scheduled to bring a family member to school for Family Appreciation Day, but with the lucrative Zap Apple harvest nearing, only Granny Smith is available, and Apple Bloom worries that she will be embarrassed by Granny's antics in front of her class, particularly Diamond Tiara. She, along with Sweetie Belle and Scootaloo, try a number of tactics to stall Granny, without success. To their surprise, Granny recounts how she, as a filly, had discovered the Zap Apple trees and their unusual magic properties, leading to the formation of Ponyville. The rest of the class is awed by the story, and when Diamond Tiara tries to dismiss it, Apple Bloom stands up for Granny. In the end, Apple Bloom has a new appreciation of her grandmother's eccentric ways while Diamond Tiara is forced to participate by her father as punishment for insulting Granny, his most important produce supplier.
39	13	"Baby Cakes"	Charlotte Fullerton	January 14, 2012	212	N/A
Mr. and Mrs. Cake give birth to a pair of twins: Pound Cake, a pegasus, and Pumpkin Cake, a unicorn. A month after their birth, the Cakes are forced to ask Pinkie Pie to babysit the twins while they cater an event. Pinkie, initially happy to be able to play with the babies, and when they start sobbing and crying, Pinkie Pie finds out how difficult is to tend to, but she refuses to accept Twilight's help, believing she can show responsibility. However, when the twins later exhibit their flying and magic abilities, Pinkie can no longer control them and breaks down in tears. The twins realize their mistake and cheers Pinkie up. Mr. and Mrs. Cake return to find everything is fine, and offer Pinkie to be their go-to babysitter in the future, which Pinkie accepts after hearing the twins say her name.
40	14	"The Last Roundup"	Amy Keating Rogers	January 21, 2012	214	N/A
Applejack goes to the Equestria rodeo with plans to donate her winnings to repair the town hall. However, when she fails to return and only sends a note that says she will be back later, Twilight and her friends go off to look for her, finding her working on a cherry farm in Dodge Junction. Applejack refuses to answer their questions of why she did not return, but after suffering from Pinkie Pie's hyperactivity, she agrees to tell them the next day. That morning, they find Applejack is trying to escape. After a chase, they catch up with her to discover that while she had won events at the rodeo, none of her wins were first place, and she instead hoped to earn money as she had no prize money to return with. Her friends assure that they would rather have her back home than a fixed town hall, and Applejack happily returns to Ponyville.
41	15	"The Super Speedy Cider Squeezy 6000"	M.A. Larson	January 28, 2012	215	N/A
Cider season has arrived, but the Apples cannot make apple cider fast enough by traditional methods to satisfy everypony. Suddenly, traveling salesponies Flim and Flam arrive with their "Super Speedy Cider Squeezy 6000", claiming they can make as good a cider in a faster time. When the Apples refuse to accept a lopsided partnership, Flim and Flam instead challenge them to a cider making contest for rights to sell cider to Ponyville. The contest starts with the brothers in a strong lead, but Applejack's friends offer their help to speed up production. As their lead was quickly diminishing, Flim and Flam disable the quality control to speed up their machine. The brothers ultimately win the contest with the most barrels of cider, but the cider is undrinkable and they quickly flee. With all of their cider made in the contest, the Apples celebrate with everypony else in town.
42	16	"Read It and Weep"	Cindy Morrow	February 4, 2012	216	N/A
Rainbow Dash ends up in the hospital with a broken wing. Twilight offers her a book from the Daring Do novels, but Rainbow Dash refuses, considering reading to be an "egghead" hobby. However, she soon gets bored and starts reading the book, soon becoming engrossed in the adventure story. Just as she nears the conclusion, she is discharged from the hospital. Worried about revealing her newfound reading hobby to anypony else, she tries to sneak into the hospital to get the book, but ends up being chased around town by the hospital staff at night, waking up her friends. Rainbow Dash admits to enjoying the book, and Twilight is only happy to share her copies with her.
43	17	"Hearts and Hooves Day"	Meghan McCarthy	February 11, 2012	217	0.32
After their consideration, the Cutie Mark Crusaders attempt to create a relationship between their schoolteacher Cheerilee and Apple Bloom's older brother Big Mac, for Hearts and Hooves Day with a love potion. However, they discover that the recipe is for a love poison, making them unable to do anything else beyond thinking about the other. The Crusaders barely manage to keep them out of eyesight of each other for an hour, breaking the spell. They apologize to Cheerilee and Big Mac, and as punishment, they take up Big Mac's chores for the entire day.
44	18	"A Friend in Deed"	Amy Keating Rogers	February 18, 2012	218	N/A
When a new resident named Cranky Doodle Donkey comes to Ponyville, Pinkie Pie attempts to befriend him, but Cranky refuses to become friends with her no matter how hard she tries. When Pinkie accidentally sets fire to Cranky's scrapbook, Cranky demands her to leave him alone and refuses to accept her apology. However, his outcries and the scrapbook give Pinkie an idea to which she reunites Cranky with another donkey that lives in Ponyville named Matilda. Cranky is amazed to see his love after having lost track of her after a Grand Galloping Gala years ago to which he happily thanks Pinkie and finally calls her his friend, much to Pinkie's happiness.
45	19	"Putting Your Hoof Down"	Story by : Charlotte Fullerton; Teleplay by : Merriwether Williams	March 3, 2012	219	N/A
Fluttershy is told by Pinkie Pie and Rarity that she is too much of a doormat, letting others take advantage of her. She attends a self-help seminar run by a minotaur named Iron Will where she learns to become more assertive in her actions, but these lessons change Fluttershy's personality dramatically beyond recognition. When Pinkie and Rarity try to convince her to be less assertive, she insults them, making them run off in tears. Fluttershy becomes ashamed of herself and hides in her cottage. When Iron Will comes around to collect payment on the seminar, Pinkie and Rarity try to stop him, fearing that Fluttershy will crumble at his demand. Instead, to their surprise, Fluttershy explains she is not satisfied with Iron Will's course, and refuses to pay as per his guarantee. Iron Will is stunned but accepts this reason, and Pinkie and Rarity praise Fluttershy for being assertive while remaining herself.
46	20	"It's About Time"	M.A. Larson	March 10, 2012	220	N/A
While worrying about planning her next monthly schedule, Twilight is briefly visited by her bedraggled future self, who tries to warn her about something that would happen next Tuesday morning, but her interruptions prevent "Future Twilight" from explaining what to be prepared for before she disappears. Twilight fears the worst and tries to take steps to prevent it. However, while nothing bad happens, Twilight suffers minor injuries that mirror her future self's look. Convinced that the only way to prevent the disaster is to stop time, she, Pinkie Pie, and Spike go to the Canterlot library to look for time-stopping spells, but when Tuesday morning arrives, nothing happens. Using a time travel spell found by Pinkie, Twilight travels back a week to tell her past self that she has nothing to worry about, realizing this is the warning "Future Twilight" tried giving her to begin with.
47	21	"Dragon Quest"	Merriwether Williams	March 17, 2012	221	N/A
After observing the Great Dragon Migration with his friends, Spike starts to question his dragon roots. He then sets out to join the dragon migration on a quest of self discovery but Twilight, Rarity, and Rainbow Dash know he will need help and tail him in a hastily made dragon costume. At a volcano, Spike joins teenage dragons who challenge him to prove that he is a dragon. With some help from his friends, Spike shows off his worth. Later, the dragons attempt to raid a nest of phoenix eggs using Spike to lure the phoenixes away. Spike returns to find an unhatched egg remaining, but refuses to smash it. His friends reveal themselves and help rescue Spike and the egg. Later in Ponyville, Spike hatches the egg, names the new phoenix chick "Peewee" and promises to take good care of it.
48	22	"Hurricane Fluttershy"	Cindy Morrow	March 24, 2012	222	N/A
Ponyville's pegasi are challenged to create a tornado to move water from their reservoir to Cloudsdale for the rainy season. Rainbow Dash wants all the pegasi to improve their speed to beat the record, but finds that Fluttershy suffers from public anxiety from her time at flight school. Fluttershy tries to train on her own with her animal friends. While she does improve, her performance is far worse than the other pegasi, and she runs off. On the day of the attempt, a number of pegasi have come down with a flu, and they barely have enough to ensure that the tornado can be made successfully. After a botched first attempt, their second tornado falls just short of the necessary speed. Twilight convinces Fluttershy to help the other pegasi and she is able to dispel her fears long enough to give enough speed to complete the tornado. Rainbow Dash and the other pegasi cheer Fluttershy on as their hero.
49	23	"Ponyville Confidential"	M.A. Larson	March 31, 2012	223	N/A
The Cutie Mark Crusaders join the school newspaper in their attempts to earn their cutie marks. Diamond Tiara, the paper's editor, wants the paper to be more exciting and has the Crusaders write a gossip column under the pen name "Gabby Gums". The column becomes a huge success, but Diamond Tiara makes the Crusaders conjure untruths and expose embarrassing secrets of all the other townsfolk, including their own friends and families. Realizing that getting their cutie marks is not worth the pain and misery they spread by not valuing others' privacy, the Crusaders try to quit, but Diamond Tiara threatens to publish humiliating photos of them if they fail to find another story. When Rarity discovers the truth about Gabby Gums, the Crusaders are shunned by all of Ponyville, making their search for stories difficult. The Crusaders come up with a plan to write an apology letter to the town, successfully submitting it without Diamond Tiara's knowledge to publish at the deadline. The townsfolk accept their apology, while Diamond Tiara is demoted to operating the printing press.
50	24	"MMMystery on the Friendship Express"	Amy Keating Rogers	April 7, 2012	224	N/A
Pinkie Pie is in charge of guarding the Cakes' dessert for a competition in Canterlot. She and her friends share the train with three rival bakers who have brought their own entries. Overnight, the Cakes' dessert is partially eaten. Pinkie immediately accuses the other bakers, but Twilight instead shows her how to investigate, and finds clues that point to their friends, Rainbow Dash, Fluttershy, and Rarity, each admitting to taking a taste. The other bakers' desserts are similarly eaten, but Pinkie, using Twilight's advice, deduces that the bakers had eaten each others' desserts after hearing Pinkie's delicious descriptions of them. The collected group use the remains of the desserts to create a single entry that wins the competition.
51	25	"A Canterlot Wedding" (Parts 1 & 2)	Meghan McCarthy	April 21, 2012	225	0.49
52	26	"A Canterlot Wedding" (Parts 1 & 2)	Meghan McCarthy	April 21, 2012	226	0.48
Part 1: Twilight and her friends are summoned to plan a wedding for Shining Armor, Twilight's older brother and captain of the royal guard at Canterlot, and Princess Cadance, her childhood foal-sitter. Twilight becomes suspicious of Cadance when she fails to remember her, and even more so when Cadance continually puts down all of her friends. When they refuse to listen to Twilight's accusations, she attempts to warn Shining Armor, only to witness Cadance place a seemingly evil spell on him. Twilight confronts Cadance at the wedding rehearsal, causing her to break down in tears. Furious, Shining Armor bans Twilight from the wedding, while her friends and Princess Celestia leave her to reflect on her actions. When Twilight tries to apologize to Cadance, she uses a magic spell that teleports Twilight underground. Part 2: After being trapped in the caves beneath Canterlot by Cadance, Twilight encounters another Cadance and learns that the Cadance who Shining Armor is about to marry is actually an impostor. Twilight and the real Cadance escape in time to stop the wedding, where Cadance exposes the impostor as Queen Chrysalis, the leader of the shape-shifting changelings. Chrysalis reveals her plan to invade Canterlot, for she has taken over Shining Armor's mind and weakened his magic shield that protects the city. She is able to defeat Princess Celestia, and her army prevents Twilight and her friends from retrieving the Elements of Harmony to stop her. As Chrysalis celebrates her victory, Twilight frees Cadance, who frees Shining Armor from Chrysalis's spell. Together, Shining Armor and Cadance use their magic to repel Chrysalis and her army. The wedding goes on as scheduled, and Twilight is heralded as a hero by her brother and friends for trusting her instincts.

== Reception ==
Reception for the second season of My Little Pony: Friendship Is Magic has generally been positive. Episodes "The Return of Harmony" and "A Canterlot Wedding" received widely positive reviews. SF Weekly stated that the series "never stops kicking at its envelope to see what it can get away with, nor does it ever underestimate the intelligence of its audience."

== DVD release ==
My Little Pony Friendship Is Magic: Season Two
Set details	Special features
26 episodes; 4-disc set; 1.78:1 aspect ratio; Subtitles: English	Live stage reading from the My Little Pony Project 2012 event; Recording of the 2012 San Diego Comic Con Pony Panel; Sing-Along song videos ("The Perfect Stallion", "Love Is In Bloom", "Smile Song", and "Becoming Popular"); Printable coloring sheets
Release dates
Region 1	Region 2
May 14, 2013	November 28, 2014
