= Hurricane Fluttershy =

- My Little Pony: Friendship Is Magic episode
- Fluttershy, in an 80's style montage, trains to overcome her performance anxiety.
- Episode no.: Season 2 Episode 22
- Written by: Cindy Morrow
- Original air date: March 24, 2012
- Running time: 22 minutes

Episode chronology
← Previous "Dragon Quest"	Next → "Ponyville Confidential"
- My Little Pony: Friendship Is Magic season 2

"Hurricane Fluttershy" is the twenty-second episode of the second season of the animated television series My Little Pony: Friendship Is Magic. The episode was written by Cindy Morrow. It originally aired on The Hub on March 24, 2012. In this episode, Fluttershy must overcome her social anxiety and flight school trauma to help Ponyville's pegasi create a tornado strong enough to move water to Cloudsdale for the rainy season.

== Plot ==
External videos
- Hurricane Fluttershy (full episode) — Official upload of the episode onto YouTube

Jen A. Blue described Fluttershy's performance anxiety as a result of her post-traumatic stress disorder, as depicted in this scene from the episode.

Rainbow Dash calls a mandatory meeting for all Ponyville's pegasus ponies to explain their upcoming mission: creating a massive tornado to lift reservoir water up to Cloudsdale, which requires a minimum combined wing power of eight hundred. The enthusiastic Rainbow Dash believes they can break the existing record by reaching over one thousand wing power, but her excitement dims when she notices Fluttershy has quietly slipped away during the presentation. When Rainbow tracks her down the next day, Fluttershy reveals her deep anxiety about flying in front of others, stemming from cruel mockery she endured at flight camp as a young pony.

Despite her reluctance, Fluttershy agrees to participate and joins the other pegasi for wing power testing. Her first attempt produces a reading of only 0.5 wing power when painful memories of flight camp bullying distract her mid-flight, which causes her to flee in embarrassment. Determined to overcome her limitations, Fluttershy trains intensively with encouragement from her animal friends in an 80's-style montage. When Fluttershy returns for a second test, her improved technique yields 2.3 wing power, which is still far below Rainbow Dash's goal of ten wing power per pony. Though her friends celebrate the improvement, Fluttershy becomes devastated that her hard work still leaves her contribution seemingly insignificant compared to the others. She retreats to her cottage in despair.

The day of the water transfer arrives with devastating news: several key team members have fallen ill with feather flu, leaving the remaining pegasi struggling to generate sufficient power. After two failed attempts that result in dangerous mid-air collisions, the tornado hovers tantalizingly close to the eight hundred minimum but falls just five wing power short of success. Twilight warns that another attempt could seriously injure the exhausted fliers, but Rainbow Dash refuses to give up on their mission to supply Cloudsdale with water.

In a moment of crisis, Fluttershy overcomes her fear and joins the tornado formation despite her performance anxiety. Her contribution provides exactly the wing power needed to reach eight hundred, successfully launching the water skyward to Cloudsdale. Fluttershy reflects in a letter to Princess Celestia that even the smallest efforts can make the difference between failure and triumph.

== Reception ==
Sherilyn Connelly, the author of Ponyville Confidential, gave the episode a "B+" rating. In her review of the episode in SF Weekly, Connelly analyzed Fluttershy's performance anxiety and noted that "that's one of the things they don't tell you about being a grownup: Sometimes the pain and anxiety only gets worse."

In a critical analysis of the episode, author Jen A. Blue described "Hurricane Fluttershy" as one of Morrow's weaker episodes, but analyzed it as a companion piece to "It's About Time" that examines "what happens when the past leaks into the present." Blue interpreted Fluttershy's performance anxiety as post-traumatic stress, arguing that her childhood teasing had become a defining moment that functions as a psychological trigger during competitive flying. Blue criticized Rainbow Dash's confrontational approach toward Fluttershy's fear and wrote that "forcing someone with a peanut allergy to eat a Snickers bar would be" similarly unhelpful, and praised the animals for providing a safe space where Fluttershy could explore her fear on her own terms. Blue connected the episode to the season's themes of time and love and wrote that Fluttershy is "empowered by the love and support of others to recognize that she is not who she was, that her present can redefine her past rather than her past always defining her present." Blue concluded that while the episode is hopeful, it remains inconclusive since future episodes would return to Fluttershy's timidity and low self-image.

Raymond Gallant of Freakin' Awesome Network gave the episode a rating of 9 out of 10 and called it "a solid episode, and definitely one of the best to come by in a while." He praised Rainbow Dash's supportive behavior toward Fluttershy and described it as a redemption episode for Rainbow Dash, though he noted some minor pacing issues and lack of comedy elements.

== Home media release ==
The episode was part of the Season 2 DVD set, released by Shout Factory on May 14, 2013.

== See also ==
- List of My Little Pony: Friendship Is Magic episodes
