= Ponyville Confidential =

- My Little Pony: Friendship Is Magic episode
- Diamond Tiara demands more compelling materials for the school newspaper.
- Episode no.: Season 2 Episode 23
- Written by: M.A. Larson
- Original air date: March 31, 2012
- Running time: 22 minutes

Episode chronology
← Previous "Hurricane Fluttershy"	Next → "MMMystery on the Friendship Express"
- My Little Pony: Friendship Is Magic season 2

"Ponyville Confidential" is the twenty-third episode of the second season of the animated television series My Little Pony: Friendship Is Magic. The episode was written by M.A. Larson. It originally aired on The Hub on March 31, 2012. In this episode, the Cutie Mark Crusaders join their school newspaper and begin writing a gossip column under the pen name "Gabby Gums".

== Plot ==
External videos
- Ponyville Confidential (full episode) — Official upload of the episode onto YouTube

The Cutie Mark Crusaders discover a new path to earning their cutie marks when Apple Bloom suggests they try writing for the school newspaper, the Foal Free Press. They discover that Cheerilee has appointed Diamond Tiara as the new editor-in-chief, who immediately demands that the publication abandon its wholesome content in favor of more sensational material. The Crusaders submit their initial batch of innocent stories about school activities, and Diamond Tiara rejects them outright and insists they produce something with more drama and excitement to capture readers' attention.

The Crusaders adopt the pseudonym "Gabby Gums" and begins writing about minor mishaps around Ponyville, starting with a harmless story about Snips and Snails getting stuck in chewing gum. The column becomes an unexpected sensation among both students and adults, with demand growing so high that the school paper begins selling copies throughout town. Encouraged by their success, the Crusaders expand their scope beyond the schoolyard and begin investigating increasingly personal stories about ponies in the community.

The pressure to maintain readership intensifies, which leads them to publish embarrassing stories about each member of the Mane Six, but the situation reaches a breaking point when they publish excerpts from Rarity's private diary. Rarity confronts Sweetie Belle about the diary theft and asks her whether earning a cutie mark through hurting others is truly worthwhile. The Crusaders attempt to resign from their positions, but Diamond Tiara refuses to let them quit and threatens to publish humiliating photographs that Featherweight captured of them. Trapped by blackmail but no longer able to conduct interviews due to their exposed identity, the girls craft a public apology acknowledging their mistakes and expressing remorse for the pain they caused.

Diamond Tiara unknowingly sends the apology letter to print, assuming it contains another scandalous story, but realizes her error too late to prevent its publication. Her abuse of power finally comes to light when Cheerilee reviews the situation and strips Diamond Tiara of her editorial position and promotes Featherweight to lead the newspaper instead.

== Reception ==
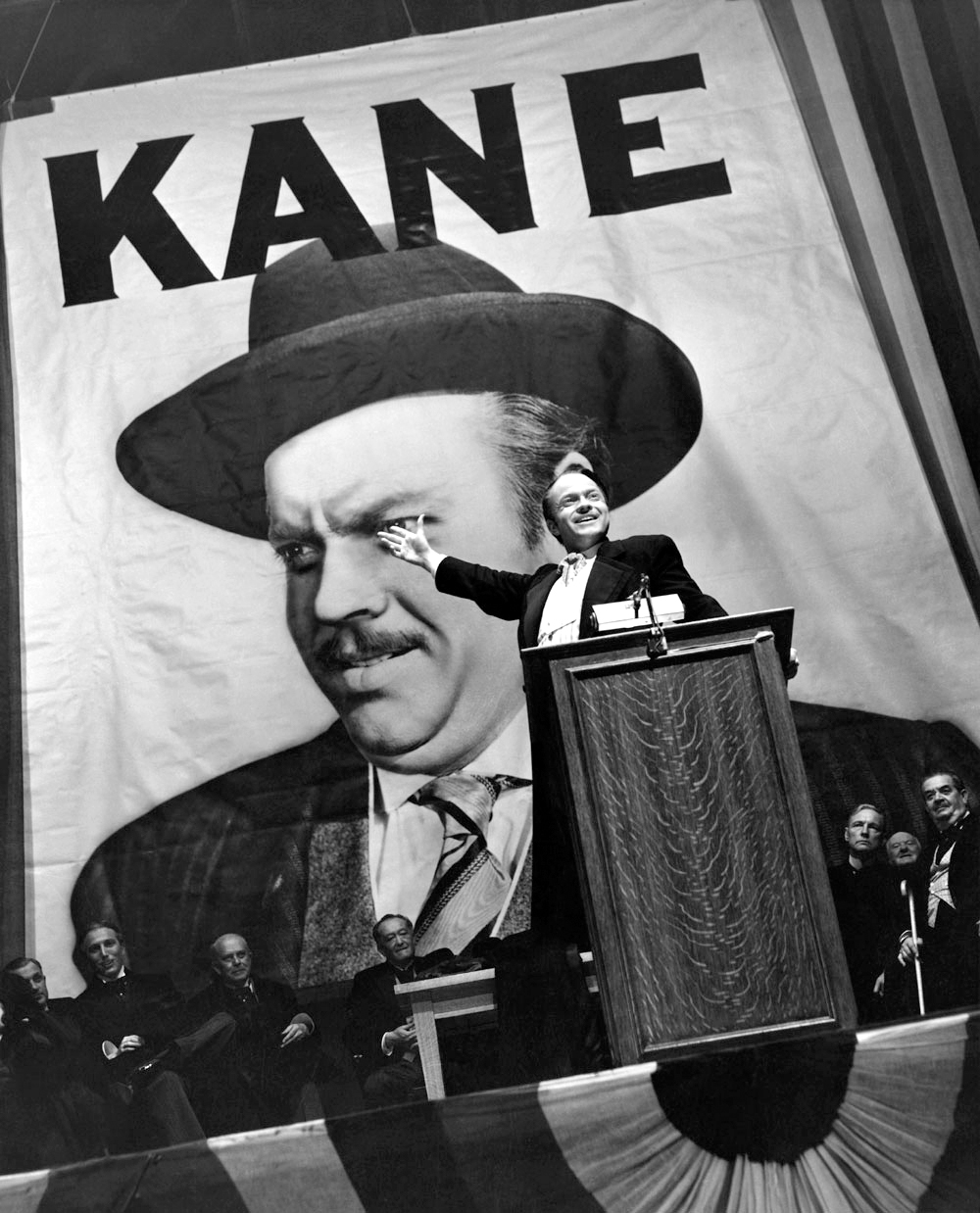
Promotional still for the 1941 film Citizen Kane

Sherilyn Connelly, the author of the 2017 book Ponyville Confidential, gave the episode a "B" rating for the story, and an "A+" for the title of the episode. In her review of the episode in SF Weekly, Connelly compared Diamond Tiara to Charles Foster Kane taking over The New York Inquirer, a Citizen Kane reference she was happy to talk about as a former film student.

In a critical analysis of the episode, author Jen A. Blue described "Ponyville Confidential" as "an extended riff on Louise Fitzhugh's classic children's novel Harriet the Spy" and argued that the episode explores themes of self-definition and power rather than a simple critique of journalism. Blue analyzed the core conflicts as violations of "the right to define oneself" as the common thing between blackmail, libel, and invasion of privacy. Blue argued that the episode had to feature the Cutie Mark Crusaders specifically because "the Crusaders' own quest is to figure out who they are, they are the perfect characters for a story about how easy it is to gain power by defining for others who they are allowed to be." Blue connected the Gabby Gums persona to the online disinhibition effect and explained that anonymity enables toxic behavior, but also examined the balance between privacy rights and accountability.

Jamie Kingston of WomenWriteAboutComics praised how the episode dealt with the theme of gossiping.

== Home media release ==
The episode was part of the Season 2 DVD set, released by Shout Factory on May 14, 2013.

== See also ==
- List of My Little Pony: Friendship Is Magic episodes
