= Putting Your Hoof Down =

- My Little Pony: Friendship Is Magic episode
- Iron Will (right) trains Fluttershy (left) on how to be assertive.
- Episode no.: Season 2 Episode 19
- Written by: Charlotte Fullerton (story); Merriwether Williams (teleplay)
- Original air date: March 3, 2012
- Running time: 22 minutes

Episode chronology
← Previous "A Friend in Deed"	Next → "It's About Time"
- My Little Pony: Friendship Is Magic season 2

"Putting Your Hoof Down" is the nineteenth episode of the second season of the animated television series My Little Pony: Friendship Is Magic. The episode was written by Charlotte Fullerton (story) and Merriwether Williams (teleplay). It originally aired on The Hub on March 3, 2012. In this episode, Fluttershy learns to become more assertive after attending a self-help seminar, but her newfound confidence transforms her kind personality beyond recognition.

== Plot ==
External videos
- Putting Your Hoof Down (full episode) — Official upload of the episode onto YouTube

Fluttershy discovers the painful consequences of being too passive when her demanding pet bunny Angel refuses his lunch for missing a single cherry. Angel's violent reaction sends her crashing into her mailbox, where she finds a flyer for an assertiveness seminar and vows to never be a pushover again.

The seminar's leader, a bombastic minotaur named Iron Will, teaches Fluttershy aggressive confrontation techniques with a money-back guarantee. After successfully demonstrating her newfound assertiveness on stage, Fluttershy returns home ready and immediately puts Iron Will's lessons into practice. She drenches a gardener when he dismisses her concerns and dumps garbage on two ponies who refuse to move their carts from a bridge.

Fluttershy's newfound aggression quickly spirals out of control as she terrorizes other ponies at Sugarcube Corner and violently ejects a taxi passenger who dares to take her ride. A simple mix-up with her mail leads to her throwing an innocent tourist into a hay bale, and Rarity and Pinkie Pie confront her about her increasingly cruel behavior. Fluttershy responds by viciously insulting her closest friends, but realizes she has become a monster she never wanted to be when she drives them to tears.

Consumed with shame, Fluttershy boards up her cottage and refuses to come out, telling her worried friends that "nasty Fluttershy" will never emerge again. Iron Will arrives demanding payment for his seminar, but Fluttershy finally demonstrates true assertiveness by calmly but firmly refusing to pay, citing his satisfaction guarantee since his techniques only made her miserable. Her respectful but unwavering stance impresses Iron Will himself, and he leaves. Fluttershy writes to Princess Celestia about learning to stand up for herself without changing who she is. Back at the cottage, Angel still refuses to eat his salad, but when Fluttershy stares at him, he tastes a little bit of it and then devours the whole thing. The episode ends with Fluttershy looking around as all her animals eat.

== Reception ==
Sherilyn Connelly, the author of Ponyville Confidential, gave the episode an "A+" rating. In her review of the episode in SF Weekly, Connelly observed that the "three overtly feminine characters" (Fluttershy, Pinkie Pie, and Rarity) are involved in the story, which worked better thematically.

In a critical analysis of the episode, author Jen A. Blue described it as a "pretty standard 'be careful what you wish for'/'don't change to please others' story" that provides "something of a corrective patch to last week's implications of mandatory friendship" ("A Friend in Deed"). Blue analyzed Fluttershy's character as having suppressed aggression that emerges explosively when her limits are reached and argued that her conflict avoidance stems from her personality rather than social norms, unlike other characters who can express anger appropriately. Blue interpreted Iron Will as teaching "aggression and intimidation under the guise of 'assertiveness training'" and analyzed Fluttershy's transformation as resulting from her tendency to "totalize aggression"; Fluttershy construes any criticism as overwhelming and thus expresses it disproportionately when encouraged. Blue examined the episode's exploration of conflict avoidance and its consequences and wrote that Fluttershy's empathy allows her to hurt others precisely because she understands their weaknesses. Blue concluded that the episode demonstrates that conflicts do not necessarily have to be destructive: "it is possible to end a conflict with no ill feelings resulting."

Republibot praised the episode as "pretty great" and called Iron Will "a hoot," writing that he turned out to be a decent character despite his bluster. However, the review criticized Angel's physical treatment of Fluttershy, writing that it "struck me as not so much a comedic slap as domestic abuse."

== Home media release ==
The episode was part of the Season 2 DVD set, released by Shout Factory on May 14, 2013.

== See also ==
- List of My Little Pony: Friendship Is Magic episodes
