= The Super Speedy Cider Squeezy 6000 =

- My Little Pony: Friendship Is Magic episode
- The Flim Flam brothers (center) perform a musical number introducing themselves and their machine.
- Episode no.: Season 2 Episode 15
- Written by: M.A. Larson
- Original air date: January 28, 2012
- Running time: 22 minutes

Episode chronology
← Previous "The Last Roundup"	Next → "Read It and Weep"
- My Little Pony: Friendship Is Magic season 2

"The Super Speedy Cider Squeezy 6000" is the fifteenth episode of the second season of the animated television series My Little Pony: Friendship Is Magic. The episode was written by M.A. Larson. It originally aired on The Hub on January 28, 2012. In this episode, the Apple family struggles to meet Ponyville's demand for apple cider, which leads to a competition with two brothers, Flim and Flam, who offer a mechanized solution that threatens the Apples' livelihood.

== Plot ==
External videos
- The Super Speedy Cider Squeezy 6000 (full episode) — Official upload of the episode onto YouTube

During apple cider season at Sweet Apple Acres, the Apple family—Applejack, Apple Bloom, Big McIntosh, and Granny Smith—begin serving cider, but their limited production quickly runs out. Left with no cider, Rainbow Dash complains loudly to Applejack, which prompts grumbling from the crowd over the chronic shortage of cider each year. Applejack explains that their traditional methods require time and care, and that rushing would compromise quality.

The next day, a strange, self-propelled machine rolls into town, operated by two slick-talking unicorn brothers, Flim and Flam. They introduce themselves with a catchy musical number ("The Flim Flam Brothers") and promote their invention, the "Super Speedy Cider Squeezy 6000," which can supposedly produce cider at rapid speeds without sacrificing taste. The brothers propose a partnership with the Apple family to combine their machinery with Sweet Apple Acres' apples but offer only a small cut of the profits. Applejack declines, as the deal would ultimately drive her family out of business.

The brothers return the next morning and begin drawing a crowd as the Apple family once again runs out of cider. When Apple Bloom boasts that her family could outperform the brothers even without the machine, Flim and Flam challenge the Apples to a cider-making contest: whoever produces the most barrels in one hour earns the exclusive right to sell cider in Ponyville. The Apple family accepts, and Mayor Mare is appointed to oversee the contest.

From the start, the Apple family is severely outmatched by the speed of the machine. Twilight Sparkle asks Mayor Mare if the honorary members of the Apple family are allowed to assist; both Applejack and the Flim Flam brothers agree. With the help of the Mane Six, the Apple family's output increases dramatically, matching and eventually surpassing the brothers'. Alarmed, Flim and Flam remove the machine's quality control to further boost its speed, but this allows it to suck up entire trees and debris in the process.

When time runs out, Mayor Mare counts the barrels and declares Flim and Flam the winners by volume. However, the cider they produced is full of contaminants and virtually undrinkable. The ponies of Ponyville recoil in disgust and refuse to buy it. With their reputation ruined, the brothers abandon the town, leaving the Apple family as the true victors. The good cider made during the contest is shared with the rest of Ponyville, and Applejack reflects in a letter to Princess Celestia that honest hard work and pride in quality are what truly sustain success.

== Reception ==
Sherilyn Connelly, the author of Ponyville Confidential, gave the episode an "A" rating and called it "far superior" to the previous week's episode, "The Last Roundup". In her review of the episode in SF Weekly, Connelly wrote that the episode had the "single greatest [friendship report] of the entire series": that Applejack had not learned anything. She wrote: "[Applejack] already knew that honest work pays off, and that her friends are always there for her, so what else is there to say? Sadly, we don't get to see Princess Celestia's face as she reads that one."

Hillary Busis of Entertainment Weekly wrote that the musical number in the episode is more than it appears, and commented that the Flim Flam brothers "bear a striking resemblance to Harold Hill, the antihero of Meredith Willson's The Music Man."

In a critical analysis of the episode, author Jen A. Blue noted that the episode became popular primarily because of its catchy song, which she described as reminiscent of "Ya Got Trouble" from The Music Man, though she noted that fans more often recognized it as similar to "Monorail" from The Simpsons. Blue analyzed the Flim Flam brothers as characters who are depicted as con men but actually keep promises and tell the truth, arguing that from a modern capitalist perspective, Applejack appears to be "entirely in the wrong and a terrible businesswoman." Blue identified the moment when the brothers abandon quality controls to win the contest, and wrote that unlike Applejack, they are "completely willing to sacrifice quality (or anything else) at a moment's notice," making them unable to function as community members. She argued that the brothers' villainy lies in how they "value nothing of the product, only the return it can bring them," representing capitalism's core assumption that everything has monetary value and nothing is irreplaceable. Blue concluded that the episode's moral demonstrates that "business ethics aren't ethical" and that honesty alone is insufficient without compassion and caring.

Raymond Gallant of Freakin' Awesome Network gave the episode a rating of 6.5 out of 10 and called it "a really middle of the road episode for this season." He praised the Flim Flam brothers as great villains and noted Applejack's character development compared to the season 1 episode "Applebuck Season", but criticized the episode's pacing and story strength.

== Home media release ==
The episode was part of the Season 2 DVD set, released by Shout Factory on May 14, 2013.

== See also ==
- List of My Little Pony: Friendship Is Magic episodes
