= MMMystery on the Friendship Express =

- My Little Pony: Friendship Is Magic episode
- Pinkie Pie (right), determined to figure out who ate the Cakes' cake, questions the passengers on the train.
- Episode no.: Season 2 Episode 24
- Written by: Amy Keating Rogers
- Original air date: April 7, 2012
- Running time: 22 minutes

Episode chronology
← Previous "Ponyville Confidential"	Next → "A Canterlot Wedding"
- My Little Pony: Friendship Is Magic season 2

"MMMystery on the Friendship Express" is the twenty-fourth episode of the second season of the animated television series My Little Pony: Friendship Is Magic. The episode was written by Amy Keating Rogers. It originally aired on The Hub on April 7, 2012. In this episode, Pinkie Pie is tasked with guarding the Cakes' dessert entry for a competition in Canterlot, but a mystery is afoot when the dessert is mysteriously eaten overnight during their train journey.

== Plot ==
External videos
- MMMystery on the Friendship Express (full episode) — Official upload of the episode onto YouTube

Pinkie Pie receives the responsibility of safely transporting Mr. and Mrs. Cake's elaborate contest entry—the "Marzipan Mascarpone Meringue Madness"—to Canterlot's national dessert competition aboard the Friendship Express. Three rival bakers board with their own spectacular creations: Gustave le Grand's sophisticated éclairs, Donut Joe's mini city constructed entirely from donuts, and Mulia Mild's life-sized chocolate mousse sculpture of a moose. Pinkie becomes convinced that her rivals will attempt sabotage and volunteers to stand guard over the precious cake throughout the night.

Overnight, mysterious shadows lead Pinkie Pie on wild chases through the train cars, from the caboose to the engine room and back again. Despite her best efforts to remain alert, she eventually succumbs to sleep and awakens the next morning to discover that three bites have been taken from the rear of the cake. Devastated, Pinkie puts on her Sherlock Holmes attire and begins constructing increasingly elaborate theories about how each rival baker could have sabotaged the dessert.

Pinkie Pie accuses Gustave of tying her to railroad tracks while attacking the cake with power tools, Donut Joe of employing sleep gas and laser weapons, and Mulia Mild of using martial arts and samurai swords. The train passes through a dark tunnel and emerges to reveal that all the other desserts have also been partially devoured, to the dismay of the ponies. Twilight methodically collects physical evidence and reconstructs the actual sequence of events from the previous night: Rainbow Dash, Fluttershy, and Rarity each succumbed to temptation after Pinkie's mouth-watering description of the cake and sneaked bites while she was distracted. The three friends confess and apologize, explaining they intended only tiny tastes but couldn't resist taking more than planned.

Pinkie conducts her own investigation into the destruction of the rival desserts and discovers matching food residues on the faces of all three competing bakers. Each contestant admits to sampling their competitors' work and being unable to stop themselves from indulging further. Rather than allowing the mutual sabotage to ruin the competition entirely, Pinkie suggests combining all the remaining fragments into a collaborative cake, which ultimately wins first place at the contest. She then devours the whole thing.

== Reception ==
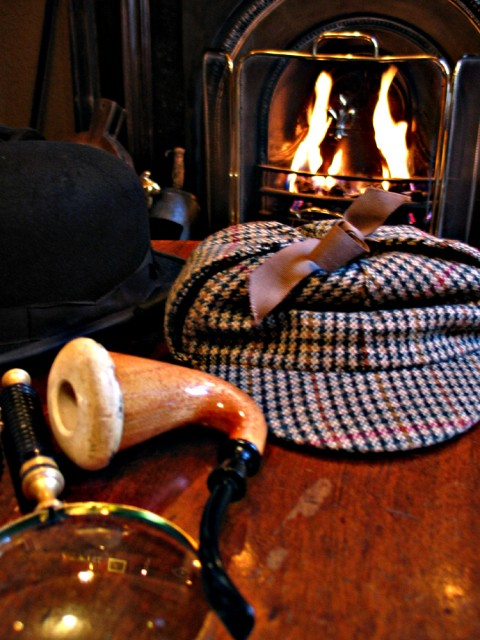
A deerstalker (right) along with a calabash pipe and a magnifying glass, paraphernalia typically associated with Sherlock Holmes

Sherilyn Connelly, the author of Ponyville Confidential, gave the episode a "B+" rating. In her review of the episode in SF Weekly, Connelly praised the episode's complexity, writing that it was "too complex for me to recap in the latter half—and that's a compliment" and described it as "a full-fledged mystery investigation, an Agatha Christie homage with heavy emphasis on visual clues." Connelly also noted the use of Arthur Conan Doyle's iconic pipe and deerstalker hat.

In a critical analysis of the episode, author Jen A. Blue described "MMMystery on the Friendship Express" as a parody of Agatha Christie's Murder on the Orient Express and analyzed the structural similarities between the two works. Blue examined how the episode blends multiple media references: "there is quite a mix of media going on here: a novel, two films, and the board game from which Clue is adapted." She argued that the episode's use of different visual styles—from silent film serials to 1960s spy thrillers to 1970s kung fu films—demonstrates "that even our feelings are subject to cultural shifts, and can change their meaning from generation to generation." Blue connected this to larger questions about whether emotions like love are cultural constructs and wrote that the episode challenges the season's other major theme of love by suggesting that "how we feel about feelings is at least partially determined by the culture around us." Blue concluded that while Friendship Is Magic posits a world where love and friendship are measurable forces, the show itself remains "a cultural construct, a product created by particular people in a particular time and place, and therefore encoded with the assumptions endemic to that culture."

Hillary Busis of Entertainment Weekly wrote that the episode was "chock full of pop culture references" like Sherlock Holmes. Brendan Kachel of flayrah called the episode "a fun mystery parody" and praised its James Bond parody elements.

== Home media release ==
The episode was part of the Season 2 DVD set, released by Shout Factory on May 14, 2013.

== See also ==
- List of My Little Pony: Friendship Is Magic episodes
