= Sylvia Zaradic =

Canadian voice actress

Sylvia Zaradic (/zəˈrædɪk/ zə-RAD-ik) is a Canadian voice actress. She has worked primarily with The Ocean Group in Vancouver.

== Animation roles ==
Title	Role	Note
Brain Powered	Midori Isami	
Escaflowne The Movie	Sora	
Galaxy Angel A	Major Mary	
Galaxy Angel S	Major Mary	
Galaxy Angel X	Major Mary	
Infinite Ryvius	Reiko Ichikawa	
InuYasha	Water Goddess	
Kessen	Garasha Hosokawa, Saizo	
Mobile Suit Gundam	Matilda Ajan	
Project ARMS	Wasp	
Star Ocean EX	Westa, Village Girl	
Ranma ½	Kodachi Kuno	after Teryl Rothery and Erin Fitzgerald
My Little Pony: Friendship Is Magic	Cherry Jubilee	The Last Roundup and Party Pooped.
