= A Friend in Deed =

- My Little Pony: Friendship Is Magic episode
- Pinkie Pie (left) introduces herself to Cranky Doodle Donkey (right) in her imagination, which is depicted using a felt stop motion animation.
- Episode no.: Season 2 Episode 18
- Written by: Amy Keating Rogers
- Original air date: February 18, 2012
- Running time: 22 minutes

Episode chronology
← Previous "Hearts and Hooves Day"	Next → "Putting Your Hoof Down"
- My Little Pony: Friendship Is Magic season 2

"A Friend in Deed" is the eighteenth episode of the second season of the animated television series My Little Pony: Friendship Is Magic. The episode was written by Amy Keating Rogers. It originally aired on The Hub on February 18, 2012. In this episode, Pinkie Pie attempts to befriend a new resident named Cranky Doodle Donkey, who repeatedly rebuffs her efforts.

== Plot ==
External videos
- A Friend in Deed (full episode) — Official upload of the episode onto YouTube

After performing a musical number about the joy of making others smile while traveling through Ponyville ("Smile Song"), Pinkie Pie encounters a surly donkey named Cranky Doodle Donkey who responds to her cheerful greeting with complete indifference. Despite his obvious desire to be left alone, Pinkie becomes determined to befriend the newcomer and brighten his spirits. Cranky angrily objects to being called "Doodle" and explains that he came to Ponyville specifically to escape social interaction and live quietly with his memories.

Pinkie's efforts to welcome Cranky to town backfire when her elaborate musical performance covers him in cake batter and accidentally knocks off his toupée, exposing his baldness to curious onlookers and causing him deep embarrassment. Though she manages to partially redeem herself by treating him to a relaxing spa day and giving him a luxuriant replacement hairpiece, Cranky remains unmoved by her gestures. At his house, Pinkie accidentally ignites his precious scrapbook while examining its contents, destroying what turns out to be his only remaining mementos of a lost love he had spent years searching for across Equestria. The pages ruined, Cranky vows to never be her friend and kicks her out of his house.

Devastated, Pinkie seeks comfort from Twilight, who gently suggests that she should respect his wishes to be left alone rather than continuing her pursuit of his friendship. However, Pinkie refuses to give up until she can properly apologize, which leads to a frantic chase through town as Cranky desperately tries to avoid her. During their confrontation, Cranky reveals that the destroyed scrapbook contained memories of a special female donkey he had met at the Grand Galloping Gala years earlier but lost contact with afterward.

Pinkie rushes off and returns with Matilda, a donkey who has been living in Ponyville the entire time and kept her own matching collection of memories from their brief courtship at the Gala. Cranky's attitude changes completely, and he gratefully accepts both Pinkie's apology and friendship. Pinkie writes to Princess Celestia about how friendship takes many different forms and that sometimes the best way to show you care is by understanding when someone needs space rather than constant attention.

== Development ==
Panels from the storyboard of "A Friend in Deed"

Pinkie is the most outlandish of the Mane Six, so she's allowed to do things that they are not. In "A Friend in Deed," the animators created a felt animation to express Pinkie's feelings about being rejected by Cranky.

— Mary Jane Begin, My Little Pony: The Art of Equestria

In October 2011, supervising director Jayson Thiessen posted two cryptic photographs of a stop motion setup on Twitter. This was the felt animation scene from the episode showing Pinkie's imagination.

In November 2015, writer Amy Keating Rogers posted an excerpt from the first draft of the episode's script that was cut from the final episode. The scene involved Rainbow Dash rejecting an advance from a pony named "Gallop-a-Gus" while Pinkie talks to Twilight about Cranky.

== Reception ==
Sherilyn Connelly, the author of Ponyville Confidential, gave the episode a "C" rating.

In a critical analysis of the episode, author Jen A. Blue described "A Friend in Deed" as "highly entertaining, if problematic" and positioned it as a continuation of the theme of love from the previous episode ("Hearts and Hooves Day"), contrasting its focus on lost love with the previous episode's exploration of new love. Blue analyzed the "Smile Song" as revealing Pinkie Pie's pathological need for approval, arguing that her happiness is fragile and dependent on the moods of others, which are outside her control. Blue examined Cranky as a strong foil for Pinkie Pie and wrote that while Pinkie suppresses her remembering self and focuses on present experiences, Cranky is fixated on happy memories and suppresses his experiential self through cynicism. Blue criticized Pinkie's behavior throughout the episode as "relentlessly thoughtless and self-centered" and stated that the episode teaches the wrong lesson by suggesting one should ignore others' wishes and force help on them. Blue concluded that despite the episode being well-constructed with appealing visuals and music, "apparently no thought was put into what this episode has to say about the supposed core focus of the show: the basics of relating to one another."

Raymond Gallant of Freakin' Awesome Network gave the episode a rating of 8 out of 10 and called it "one of the stronger episodes of this season," praising the "Smile Song" as "the best song of the series so far." He noted that while Pinkie Pie was in top form, she could be "a little too random at times" and criticized the episode's lack of focus on the main cast. Brendan Kachel of flayrah wrote that the episode was "a great episode, filled with inventive animation" (likening the Pinkie's imagination scene to the animation of South Park) and praised its hilarious dialogue, though he remarked that the episode was not quite on the same level as "Party of One". Kachel found the ending surprisingly touching when Pinkie reunites Cranky Donkey with his lost love. Kieran Hair, writing in WhatCulture, remarked that the episode taught a problematic lesson that "if somepony doesn't like you, pester them endlessly until they change their mind," arguing that while the show attempts to teach kids to look past someone's hostile exterior to see underlying pain, it fails to emphasize the equally important value of respecting personal boundaries.

Rae Grimes of Comic Book Resources ranked the "Smile Song" as the ninth best song in Friendship Is Magic. She wrote that it is arguably the best among the four songs featured in "A Friend in Deed", and noted the sharp contrast between the song and the remainder of the episode, in which Pinkie attempts to get Cranky Doodle Donkey to smile. Johnnie Jungleguts of Yahoo! Entertainment ranked "A Friend in Deed" the second best episode of My Little Pony, praising how the seemingly light story about Pinkie Pie trying to cheer up the newly arrived Cranky Doodle Donkey actually "has pathos" as Pinkie's meddling exposes Cranky's profound loneliness and pain. Jungleguts wrote that the episode's plot twists make the inevitable happy ending surprising and praised Pinkie's "Smile Song" as recalling "outsider songwriters like Daniel Johnston or the Polyphonic Spree," calling the episode "a singular, timeless slice of 'Pony'."

== Home media release ==
The episode was part of the Season 2 DVD set, released by Shout Factory on May 14, 2013.

== See also ==
- List of My Little Pony: Friendship Is Magic episodes
