= The Mysterious Mare Do Well =

- My Little Pony: Friendship Is Magic episode
- Rainbow Dash (left) approaches the mysterious Mare Do Well (right) on stage.
- Episode no.: Season 2 Episode 8
- Directed by: Jayson Thiessen; James Wootton
- Written by: Merriwether Williams
- Original air date: November 26, 2011
- Running time: 22 minutes

Episode chronology
← Previous "May the Best Pet Win!"	Next → "Sweet and Elite"
- My Little Pony: Friendship Is Magic season 2

"The Mysterious Mare Do Well" is the eighth episode of the second season of the animated television series My Little Pony: Friendship Is Magic. The episode was written by Merriwether Williams. It originally aired on The Hub on November 26, 2011. In this episode, Rainbow Dash becomes a local hero after saving ponies from danger, but she soon discovers that she is being upstaged by a masked hero named Mare Do Well.

== Plot ==
External videos
- The Mysterious Mare Do Well (full episode) — Official upload of the episode onto YouTube

Rainbow Dash begins performing heroic acts around town. She rescues a filly from a well, saves a runaway baby stroller from going over a cliff, and catches elderly ponies from a collapsed balcony, all to the admiration from the townsponies. As Rainbow revels in the attention, her friends begin to notice that the hero status is going to her head when she starts giving self-aggrandizing speeches about her deeds to crowds of fans and press ponies.

While Rainbow signs autographs outside one day, she hears a cry for help and sees Cherry Berry falling in a ruptured hot air balloon, but before she can reach the scene, a masked pony in a purple costume leaps from a rooftop and saves Cherry first. Mayor Mare dubs this new hero "The Mysterious Mare Do Well" and declares her the new hero of Ponyville, which immediately makes Rainbow jealous and defensive about her territory. A series of incidents follows where Mare Do Well consistently outperforms Rainbow's rescue efforts and demonstrates superior abilities including physical strength, prescience, unicorn magic, and flight. Rainbow Dash becomes increasingly frustrated as her friends express admiration for the new hero.

Feeling dejected and desperate to prove herself superior, Rainbow tries to inject herself into mundane tasks around town when she is unable to find any real disasters to prevent, which only annoys the townsponies and makes her feel worse. At a thank-you parade honoring Mare Do Well, Rainbow tries to unmask the mysterious hero on stage, which leads to a chase through the Ponyville streets. She finally catches and pins Mare Do Well to the ground and removes the pony's mask. Rainbow discovers Pinkie Pie underneath, but moments later two more Mare Do Wells appear and reveal themselves as Twilight Sparkle and Applejack.

The rest of the Mane Six explain how they coordinated to portray Mare Do Well at different times: Rarity created the costumes and Fluttershy flew in disguise during rescue missions, all to teach Rainbow that a real hero does not rub her accomplishments in everyone's face. Rainbow acknowledges her arrogant behavior and reflects on the importance of acting with grace and humility.

== Reception ==
Sherilyn Connelly, the author of Ponyville Confidential, gave the episode a "C-" rating. In her review of the episode in SF Weekly, Connelly questioned the moral implications of the friends' scheme, asking whether humiliation was an appropriate response to Rainbow Dash's bragging. She noted that while Rainbow Dash was being boastful, at least she was honest about it, unlike her friends who actively lied and created false hopes among Ponyville's citizens. Connelly compared the episode to George Bluth Sr.'s manipulative life lessons via notes from Arrested Development and concluded that the episode was morally ambiguous.

In a critical analysis of the episode, author Jen A. Blue defended "The Mysterious Mare Do Well" against widespread criticism. Blue argued that complaints about the episode were unfounded and that it functioned as effective character development for Rainbow Dash. Blue analyzed the episode as both a character study and a superhero genre parody, noting references to Superman, Spider-Man, Batman, and Darkwing Duck, and describing Rainbow Dash's behavior as going "far beyond merely taking pride in her accomplishments" to becoming genuinely self-centered and negligent. She addressed criticism of the friends' scheme by arguing that their actions were consistent with their established characters and represented a self-aware parody of superhero genre conventions, and compared it to "Lesson Zero" where "a character's longstanding negative traits come back to bite them." Blue acknowledged that the episode "uncomfortably echoes major systemic issues in our culture and schools" and understood why it received backlash, but concluded that the episode was "a flawed, but overall well-executed, attempt to advance Rainbow Dash's character while having fun with a genre pastiche."

Raymond Gallant of Freakin' Awesome Network gave the episode a rating of 5 out of 10 and called it "the weakest episode of the season," though he praised the design of Mare Do Well and the use of classic hero cliches. He criticized Rainbow Dash's repetitive ego problems and the decision to air two Rainbow Dash episodes consecutively, concluding with the pun that "The Mysterious Mare Did Bad." Anime Superhero News called the episode "hilarious" and praised it as an effective parody of the superhero genre. The review recommended the episode to superhero fans even if they did not normally enjoy the show, though the reviewer mentioned that the real identity of Mare Do Well was obvious early on. Republibot described the episode as feeling "odd" and "weird". While the reviewer praised the Mare Do Well character design that borrowed from Batman and Darkwing Duck, they criticized the Mane Six's conspiratorial approach without directly confronting Rainbow Dash first. The reviewer wrote that the episode also felt off to many fans and sparked debate within the brony fandom.

Jamie Kingston of WomenWriteAboutComics criticized "The Mysterious Mare Do Well" as an episode with a problematic message and wrote that while Rainbow Dash's arrogance and overconfidence needed addressing, the other five ponies problematically chose to create a superhero who would outdo her rather than simply sitting down and talking to Rainbow Dash about why her bragging and vain-gloriousness was off-putting.

== Home media release ==
The episode was part of the Season 2 DVD set, released by Shout Factory on May 14, 2013.

== See also ==
- List of My Little Pony: Friendship Is Magic episodes
