= Read It and Weep (My Little Pony: Friendship Is Magic) =

- My Little Pony: Friendship Is Magic episode
- Rainbow Dash holds a copy of "Daring Do and the Quest for the Sapphire Stone".
- Episode no.: Season 2 Episode 16
- Written by: Cindy Morrow
- Original air date: February 4, 2012
- Running time: 22 minutes

Episode chronology
← Previous "The Super Speedy Cider Squeezy 6000"	Next → "Hearts and Hooves Day"
- My Little Pony: Friendship Is Magic season 2

"Read It and Weep" is the sixteenth episode of the second season of the animated television series My Little Pony: Friendship Is Magic. The episode was written by Cindy Morrow. It originally aired on The Hub on February 4, 2012. In this episode, Rainbow Dash ends up in the hospital with a broken wing and discovers her love of reading through the Daring Do adventure novels, but struggles to admit her newfound hobby to her friends.

== Plot ==
External videos
- Read It and Weep (full episode) — Official upload of the episode onto YouTube

While performing dazzling aerial maneuvers for her impressed friends, Rainbow Dash loses control during a particularly ambitious stunt and crashes hard enough to break her wing, landing her in Ponyville Hospital for several days of mandatory rest. Rainbow dismisses Twilight's gift of an adventure novel called "Daring Do and the Quest for the Sapphire Stone" by insisting that reading is only for "eggheads" like Twilight.

Boredom eventually drives Rainbow to reluctantly open the book, where she discovers an immediate connection with the titular archaeologist hero who has also suffered a wing injury in a crash. As she becomes increasingly absorbed in Daring Do's perilous jungle expedition and temple exploration filled with deadly traps, Rainbow finds herself genuinely excited about following the story but deeply conflicted about this development since she has always prided herself on being action-oriented rather than bookish.

When her friends visit during her hospital stay, Rainbow desperately conceals her reading activity through various deceptions. Her anxiety peaks when Dr. Horse discharges her before she can finish the thrilling climax where Daring Do faces a death trap involving closing walls and rising sand. As a result, Rainbow attempts increasingly desperate schemes to regain access to the book.

After failed attempts at faking continued injury and a nighttime break-in that results in a chaotic chase through Ponyville, Rainbow is finally cornered by hospital security and her worried friends outside the Golden Oak Library. Forced to confess her newfound passion for literature, she braces for mockery but instead receives enthusiastic support from her friends, who remind her that athleticism and intelligence aren't mutually exclusive traits. Twilight gladly shares her entire collection of Daring Do adventures with Rainbow, who apologizes for making such a fuss and acknowledges the importance of trying new experiences rather than rejecting them based on preconceived notions.

== Reception ==
Sherilyn Connelly, the author of Ponyville Confidential, gave the episode a "B-" rating. In her review of the episode in SF Weekly, Connelly praised the animation quality of the Daring Do sequences and traced the character's literary influences back to H. Rider Haggard's Allan Quatermain from the 1885 novel King Solomon's Mines. She wrote: "in Equestria, there's no reason why women can't be adventurers. That's only a problem in this world."

In a critical analysis of the episode, author Jen A. Blue described "Read It and Weep" as "an inversion of the fairly typical 'reading is fun' episode of a children's show." Blue argued that Rainbow Dash serves as "a surrogate for the adult (and especially adult male) members of the fandom, many of whom were likewise troubled by the contrast between the self-projected image required of a man in a society defined by anxious masculinity and patriarchal competition, and the pleasure of watching a 'show for little girls.'" Blue examined the episode's structure as a pastiche-of-a-pastiche, noting musical references to The Neverending Story and describing the Daring Do plot as "a bare-bones pastiche of the Indiana Jones films, themselves pastiches of the adventure serials of the 1930s and 40s." Blue analyzed the symbolic significance of the kitten and "barking mad" pony, arguing that the kitten represents "the safe path" while the barking pony "represents Rainbow Dash's continued derangement" and marks the moment she loses her ability to distinguish between reality and fiction. Blue suggested the episode felt like "an attempt to test the waters for a spinoff" and reflected on how the Ponyville segments depicted "a brightly colored place strong on friendship and low on violence" that could offer viewers an escape into a world focused on characters and relationships rather than action-adventure spectacle.

Raymond Gallant of Freakin' Awesome Network gave the episode a rating of 7.5 out of 10 and called it "another solid episode for the series." He praised the Daring Do action sequences and Indiana Jones parody but noted that the exciting book segments made the hospital scenes feel uneven by comparison. Hillary Busis of Entertainment Weekly wrote that the story-within-a-story featured in the episode is "a lot like the first Indiana Jones movie, minus Harrison Ford."

== Home media release ==
The episode was part of the Season 2 DVD set, released by Shout Factory on May 14, 2013.

== See also ==
- List of My Little Pony: Friendship Is Magic episodes
