= Hearts and Hooves Day =

- My Little Pony: Friendship is Magic episode
- The Cutie Mark Crusaders (center) try to get Cheerilee (left) and Big McIntosh (right) together.
- Episode no.: Season 2 Episode 17
- Directed by: James Wootton
- Written by: Meghan McCarthy
- Editing by: Mark Kuehnel; Rob Renzetti (story)
- Original air date: February 11, 2012
- Running time: 22 minutes

Episode chronology
← Previous "Read It and Weep"	Next → "A Friend in Deed"
- My Little Pony: Friendship Is Magic season 2

"Hearts and Hooves Day" is the seventeenth episode of the second season of the animated television series My Little Pony: Friendship is Magic and the forty-third episode of the series overall. It was written by Meghan McCarthy and directed by series director James Wootton. The episode first aired in the United States on February 11, 2012 on The Hub. The episode was viewed by an estimated audience of 316,000, and became the second-highest rated program to ever air on The Hub.

In this Valentine's Day-themed episode, the Cutie Mark Crusaders, composed of Apple Bloom, Scootaloo, and Sweetie Belle, attempt to create a relationship between their schoolteacher Cheerilee and Apple Bloom's older brother Big McIntosh for Hearts and Hooves Day with a love potion. However, when they discover that their potion is actually a poison that causes Cheerilee and Big Mac to become overly obsessed with each other, they must find a way to reverse its effects.

== Plot ==
External videos
- Hearts and Hooves Day (full episode) — Official upload of the episode onto YouTube

The Cutie Mark Crusaders—Apple Bloom, Scootaloo, and Sweetie Belle—discover that their teacher Cheerilee lacks a "very special somepony" to be with on Hearts and Hooves Day. They set off to seek a potential partner for her, eventually settling on Apple Bloom's older brother, Big McIntosh.

They initially set up a romantic meeting between the two, using false pretenses to bring the two together, but this proves unsuccessful. The three happen across Twilight Sparkle, reading a book about Hearts and Hooves Day, including the recipe for a potion purportedly able to make a couple fall in love. Borrowing the book, the Crusaders create the potion, and again lure Cheerilee and Big McIntosh to a romantic setting. The older ponies drink the concoction, and magically fall in love with each other, forgetting about everything else beyond being with each other. Though initially pleased, the Crusaders realize this is not the desired result, and upon consulting the book, learn that the potion is actually a poison that caused Equestria to fall into chaos centuries ago when the prince and princess who drank it were too lovestruck to rule their kingdom. Fortunately, there is a remedy: the two love-struck ponies must be kept out of eyesight of each other for one hour to break the spell.

The three convince Cheerilee to look for a wedding dress and Big McIntosh to select a wedding jewel, forcing the two to separate. Sweetie Belle is able to barricade Cheerilee within the Carousel Boutique, but Apple Bloom and Scootaloo lose track of Big McIntosh at the jewelry store. As he races back toward the Boutique, Apple Bloom tries and fails to slow him down. Sweetie Belle and Scootaloo are able to dig a giant pit in Big McIntosh's path, but when he falls in, his cries alert Cheerilee to his presence, and she bursts out of the Boutique. The Crusaders attempt a final stand with only moments before the hour is up as Cheerilee jumps into the pit, knocking them aside. As they all recover, the Crusaders are relieved to find the spell has worn off, though Cheerilee and Big McIntosh question what has happened.

The Crusaders explain that the events that led up to this were because of their selfish meddling to make them fall in love with each other, and apologize for the ordeal. Cheerilee and Big MacIntosh accept their apology but punishes the trio by assigning them to do Big McIntosh's chores at Sweet Apple Acres for the day, and she and Big McIntosh walk off together with a teasing ambiguity about the state of their actual relationship.

== Broadcast and reception ==
=== Ratings ===
"Hearts and Hooves Day" aired on February 11, 2012 and was viewed by an estimated 316,000 children between the ages of 2 and 11. The episode managed to become the second-highest program ever broadcast by The Hub at the time of its airing. Leading up to the episode's premiere, the network hosted a My Little Pony Fan Favorites Mare-A-Thon that made large gains in the audience. The marathon helped the network "significantly" outperform its 2011 year-ago ratings, making gains among kids between the ages of 6-11 by over 165%, kids aged 2–11 by over 160%, women aged 18–49 by over 233%, adults aged 18–49 by over 168%, and households by over 178%. An encore presentation of the episode, on February 14, was viewed by over 11,000 kids aged 6–11 and was watched in over 61,000 households.

=== Critical reception ===
The episode received largely positive reviews from critics. Sherilyn Connelly, the author of Ponyville Confidential, gave the episode a "B" rating. Raymond Gallant from Freakin Awesome Network awarded the episode a rating of 8.5 out of 10, and called it "another quality episode of a quality season." He cited the "entertaining and hilarious" qualities of the Cutie Mark Crusaders, and he praised the quality of the episode's writing. However, Gallant did comment on the naïvety of Twilight Sparkle, writing, "While the show has had Twilight suffer from being overly naïve at times, it really hadn’t happened for a while until now, and it feels really out of place." A review from Republibot noted that "Romantic episodes of non-romantic shows are tough to do, doubly so when it's a kid's show. They did a good job here, with the real emphasis being on the importance of one's responsibilities, and not interfering with others' relationships." The review praised the episode, and wrote that "The animation continues to be fantastic."

== Home media release ==
"Hearts and Hooves Day" was released on the My Little Pony: Friendship is Magic - Royal Pony Wedding DVD, along with both parts of "A Canterlot Wedding" (Season 2, Episodes 25 and 26), "Sweet and Elite" (Season 2, Episode 9), and "The Best Night Ever" (Season 1, Episode 26), on August 7, 2012. It has also been released as part of the complete Season 2 DVD set.
