= It's About Time (My Little Pony: Friendship Is Magic) =

- My Little Pony: Friendship Is Magic episode
- A bedraggled Twilight Sparkle from the future (right) attempts to share a warning to present-day Twilight (left).
- Episode no.: Season 2 Episode 20
- Written by: M.A. Larson
- Original air date: March 10, 2012
- Running time: 22 minutes

Episode chronology
← Previous "Putting Your Hoof Down"	Next → "Dragon Quest"
- My Little Pony: Friendship Is Magic season 2

"It's About Time" is the twentieth episode of the second season of the animated television series My Little Pony: Friendship Is Magic. The episode was written by M.A. Larson. It originally aired on The Hub on March 10, 2012. In this episode, Twilight Sparkle is visited by her bedraggled future self who tries to warn her about an impending disaster, which causes Twilight to become increasingly paranoid about preventing a future catastrophe.

== Plot ==
External videos
- It's About Time (full episode) — Official upload of the episode onto YouTube

Twilight Sparkle's obsessive scheduling habits lead to an all-night planning session that gets interrupted by a startling visitor: her own future self, appearing with a facial scar, an eye patch, a head bandage, a burnt mane, and a tattered black suit. Future Twilight attempts to share an urgent warning about an impending catastrophe. Before she can explain the nature of the disaster, however, future Twilight vanishes back to her own timeline, leaving only cryptic clues about a threat arriving by next Tuesday morning. As a result, present-day Twilight mobilizes all of Ponyville to "disaster-proof" Equestria against every conceivable emergency.

The three-headed guard dog Cerberus escapes from Tartarus and rampages through town, and Twilight assumes this must be the foretold disaster and successfully lures the beast back to its post. However, a letter from Princess Celestia about the missing dog creates a paper cut on Twilight's face in the exact spot where future Twilight bore a scar, which convinces her that the real catastrophe still approaches. In an attempt to avoid triggering any events, she attempts to be completely immobile, but Spike's teasing causes her to react violently, resulting in a magical accident that burns her mane into the same singed style as her future counterpart.

Desperate for answers, Twilight seeks help from "Madame Pinkie Pie's" fortune-telling booth, but receives only predictions about birthday presents. As various mishaps give her the remaining injuries that match future Twilight's appearance—a flower pot creates her head bandage, and misuse of a telescope damages her eye—Twilight becomes convinced that only stopping time itself can prevent the looming disaster. She leads a midnight infiltration of Canterlot's magical archives to find the necessary spell.

When Tuesday morning arrives without incident, Twilight realizes her anxiety was completely unfounded and vows to stop worrying about problems that don't exist. Pinkie discovers a time-travel spell that allows one brief trip to the past, which Twilight uses to warn her earlier self about the coming crisis. The spell cuts off before she can explain that there is no actual disaster, creating the exact scenario that started her week of paranoia and revealing that her injuries came from her own frantic preparations rather than any external threat. Meanwhile, Spike now has a stomachache from eating too much ice cream. He says that it is Future Spike’s problems, but now he is Future Spike. He and Twilight then go home together.

== Reception ==
Sherilyn Connelly, the author of Ponyville Confidential, gave the episode an "A" rating. In her review of the episode in SF Weekly, Connelly commented on the episode's time loop concept, writing that "it's hard to not feel a little existential terror when considering that time loop continuing on."

In a critical analysis of the episode, author Jen A. Blue examined "It's About Time" as an "ontological paradox" or "time loop" that raises questions about free will, destiny, and determinism. Blue analyzed how Twilight's attempts to prevent a perceived disaster actually cause the very future she saw and wrote that "everything that happens is logically consistent" despite the circular nature of events. Blue wrote that the episode presents a single event viewed from two perspectives, explaining that "there is only one event, one point in time and space which Twilight views from two different perspectives." Blue positioned the episode within the season's exploration of time and commented on its significance in establishing Twilight's character. She wrote that between this episode and "Lesson Zero", it becomes clear that "Twilight has a tendency to overreact and create disasters where none are needed." She concluded that this character knowledge would be important in understanding the season finale ("A Canterlot Wedding").

Brendan Kachel of flayrah wrote that the episode was "great" and that it was an example of how comedy can be cruel per the excessive amount of slapstick pain done to Twilight, though he argued that the humor was acceptable because most of Twilight's injuries were self-inflicted due to her obsessive-compulsive behavior.

An article in Transformative Works and Cultures by Kevin Veale noted the high information density of the episode. The article noted that "It's About Time" contains a single scene that contains visual references to Escape from New York (1981), The Terminator (1984), and Metal Gear Solid (1998).

== Home media release ==
The episode was part of the Season 2 DVD set, released by Shout Factory on May 14, 2013.

== See also ==
- List of My Little Pony: Friendship Is Magic episodes
