= The Return of Harmony =

- My Little Pony: Friendship Is Magic episodes
- Twilight Sparkle (front) with Rainbow Dash, Fluttershy (flying, left to right), Pinkie Pie, Applejack, and Rarity (background, left to right) unite with the Elements of Harmony to defeat Discord
- Episode nos.: Season 2 Episodes 1 and 2
- Directed by: Jayson Thiessen; James Wootton
- Written by: M.A. Larson
- Editing by: Mark Kuehnel; Rob Renzetti (story)
- Original air dates: September 17, 2011 (Part 1); September 24, 2011 (Part 2)
- Running time: 44 minutes (combined)

Guest appearance
- John de Lancie as Discord

Episode chronology
← Previous "The Best Night Ever"	Next → "Lesson Zero"
- My Little Pony: Friendship Is Magic season 2

"The Return of Harmony" is the collective name for the first and second episodes of the second season of the animated television series My Little Pony: Friendship Is Magic, as well as the twenty-seventh and twenty-eighth episodes of the series overall. Both episodes were directed by Jayson Thiessen and written by M.A. Larson. Part one of the episode aired in the United States on September 17, 2011 on the Hub, while part two aired the following week, on September 24. The first received a Nielsen household rating of 0.2, and was viewed by over 339,000 viewers, making it the highest-rated episode ever broadcast by the Hub at that point.

The series follows Twilight Sparkle as her mentor Princess Celestia guides her to learn about friendship in Ponyville. Twilight becomes close friends with five other ponies: Applejack, Rarity, Fluttershy, Rainbow Dash, and Pinkie Pie. In the first part of the episode, a mischievous draconequus named Discord escapes from his stone prison, while Twilight and her five friends discover that the Elements of Harmony have been stolen. They must retrieve them in order to save Equestria from eternal chaos but have to contend with Discord's mind games first. In part two, Twilight is determined to find the Elements of Harmony after her best friends are hypnotically brainwashed by Discord, and all of Equestria begins to fall into disarray.

== Plot ==
External videos
- The Return of Harmony: Parts 1 & 2 (full episode) — Official upload of the episode onto YouTube

=== Part 1 ===
Cheerilee walks her students through Canterlot's sculpture garden, where she shows them a statue of a dragon-like creature known as a draconequus, a creature that represents discord and a lack of harmony. The Cutie Mark Crusaders get into a fight over what the statue represents. As the group moves away from the statue, the statue starts to crack, and an evil laughter is heard.

Later, Twilight Sparkle and her friends find strange phenomena occurring around Ponyville, such as cotton candy clouds dispensing chocolate milk and Applejack's apples growing bigger. Twilight's magic is not strong enough to stop it. Soon, Spike coughs up a letter from Celestia, urging Twilight and her friends to see her in Canterlot. Celestia takes them to the vault where the Elements of Harmony are kept. She tells the ponies that the strange phenomena they have noticed is being caused by an old enemy of hers named Discord, the spirit of chaos and disharmony. Celestia tells of how Discord once ruled Equestria in an eternal state of chaos before she and Luna defeated him by turning him into a stone statue. But he has escaped his prison and Celestia asks Twilight and her friends to use the Elements of Harmony to defeat Discord. However, the box that normally holds the Elements is completely empty upon opening it.

Suddenly, an image of Discord on the stained-glass windows comes to life, teasing the ponies. Discord claims to have taken the Elements and alludes to where they can be located. Twilight believes Discord is referring to the hedge maze near the castle and the six race there. Discord challenges the ponies to a game, telling them that the only rules are they are not allowed to fly or use magic (illustrating his point by stealing Rainbow Dash and Fluttershy's wings and Twilight and Rarity's horns), and that if any of them leave the game, he automatically wins. Despite this, the ponies enter the maze, but they are soon trapped and separated by Discord's magic. He is able to individually test Applejack, Pinkie Pie, Rarity, and Fluttershy against their respected Elements, making them be momentarily hypnotized, lose some of their color, and become an opposite of their Element (Applejack becoming a compulsive liar, Pinkie becoming a cynical grouch, Rarity becoming a greedy hoarder, and Fluttershy becoming a heartless bully). Twilight encounters each of them after this point, aware of their personality shift, but oblivious to their encounter with Discord. Soon, they find Rainbow Dash, having regained her wings, flying away from the maze to "save" her home of Cloudsdale and not only betraying her friends, but also forfeiting the game by leaving; Discord makes the maze fall around them, returns their wings and horns, and boasts about his victory, warning of an incoming storm of chaos.

=== Part 2 ===
Twilight confronts Discord by accusing him of cheating. However, Discord counters this by reminding her that, while he had hinted at where the Elements were, he never said anything about them being in the labyrinth. Twilight realizes that a line from Discord's riddle actually refers to Ponyville itself.

Twilight leads her friends back to Ponyville, which Discord has altered in a chaotic manner. Discord continues to taunt Twilight, who is determined to get back to the library in town to find a way to defeat Discord while her friends' personalities continue to become more warped, losing even more of their color until they are completely monochrome. Managing to get them all into the library, Twilight and Spike locate the book about the Elements of Harmony and find that the book actually contains the Elements. Her friends play keep away with the book before Twilight forces them to wear the Elements; Twilight also assigns Spike as the temporary Element of Loyalty because Rainbow is not present. They go to face Discord, but the Elements fail to activate. The other four ponies quickly drop the Elements and leave in a huff, leaving Twilight despondent and finally losing her own color. She throws the Elements away and decides to leave Ponyville.

Upon returning to the library to pack up, Twilight finds Spike coughing up scroll after scroll. Twilight finds these to be the friendship report letters that she had previously sent to Celestia, and the memories of her friendships in Ponyville make her regain her color. Inspired by this, she retrieves to the Elements, tracks down her other four friends, and uses a memory spell to remind them of their friendship, cancelling out Discord's magic and returning them to normal.

Rainbow is still apart from the group, however, and without her, the Elements will not activate. They find her (who has become a faithless slacker) protecting a cloud, believing it to be Cloudsdale. Rainbow refuses to help, claiming she wants to remain at "Cloudsdale" and escapes. They use a hot-air balloon, pulled along by Fluttershy, to catch up to Rainbow. The ponies eventually catch Rainbow and manage to tie her down long enough for Twilight to cast her memory spell, reverting Rainbow to normal as well.

Afterwards, the ponies collect the Elements and reapproach Discord, who passes off their threat. However, with all six ponies restored, the Elements activate, firing a rainbow-beam of light that engulfs Discord and Ponyville. Ponyville returns to normal and Discord is once again turned to stone. The ponies' victory is later celebrated by a large ceremony at Canterlot led by Celestia, who praises their heroism and the power of their friendship and reveals a new stained-glass window of the six ponies defeating Discord together.

== Production ==
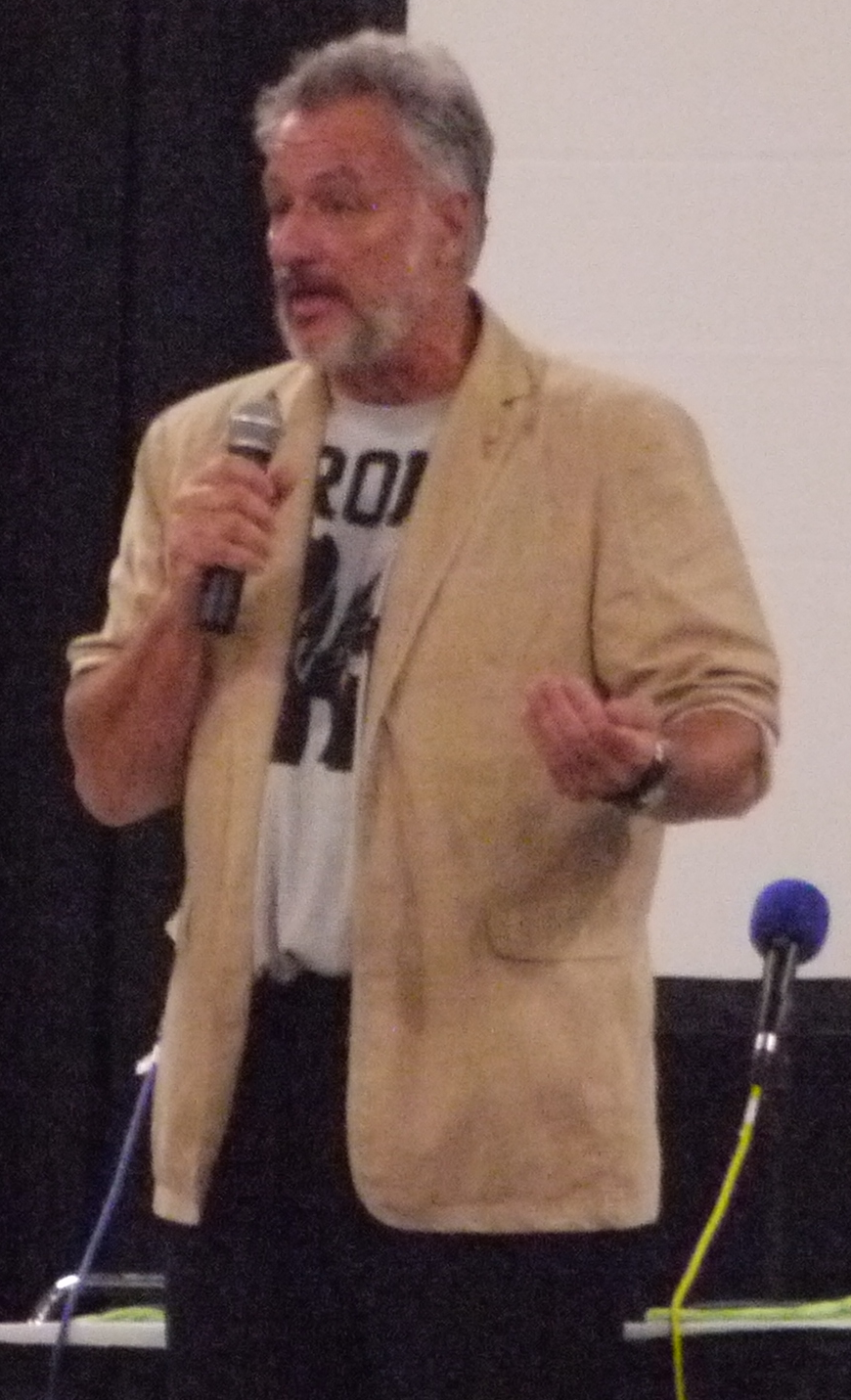
John de Lancie guest stars in the episode as Discord

"The Return of Harmony" was directed by Jayson Thiessen and James Wootton and was written by M.A. Larson. John de Lancie guest stars in the episode as Discord. According to Thiessen, Lauren Faust had conceived of Discord while watching a series of Star Trek: The Next Generation episodes, using Q (portrayed by de Lancie) as a template. When it came time to consider voice actors for the role, the production team had considered using a stand-in for de Lancie, but were surprised to learn that de Lancie himself was available for the role. Upon hearing the news, the team altered some elements of the episode to provide more allusion to his previous role, such as the flash of light when Discord would appear or disappear. de Lancie was later surprised by the large positive responses from the adult fans of the series, leading him to learn more about this fandom, and participating as executive director of the documentary about the fandom Bronies: The Extremely Unexpected Adult Fans of My Little Pony. de Lancie has since re-voiced Discord for later episodes of the series and promotions on The Hub.

The episodes were the final to feature Lauren Faust as executive producer. Near the end of the first season, Faust announced that she, for the second season, she stepped down as executive producer, to become consulting producer. Her involvement in the second season consisted mainly of story conception and scripts. Despite her decreased participation, she still has high hopes for the staff members, stating "the gaps I have left are being filled by the same amazing artists, writers, and directors who brought you Season 1. I'm certain the show will be as entertaining as ever". In addition, a new storyboard editor named Jim Miller was hired for the second season, and a majority of the animation was "outsourced" to animation company Top Draw. According to Thiessen, this allowed for a greater pre-production process for season two episodes.

"The Return of Harmony" was the first episode of the second season. According to Thiessen, The Hub and its parent company Hasbro had "approved the season two before we were done with season one; they knew they had something good on their hands." He explained, "they saw [the success] of the show early on, which is ... rare because usually a season will be one and aired before a network will renew it because they want to know what the numbers are, but they, I guess, a bit of a risk on their behalf, but I'm glad they did." The finale scene of the episode is a parody of the ending from the 1977 film Star Wars Episode IV: A New Hope. According to Thiessen, the joke was an "afterthought"; originally, there was going to be a more elaborate ending, but due to time constraints, a new finale was created. During the animation stage, one of the directors noted that the scene was "kind of like the ending to A New Hope," and so, the decision was made to create "scene for scene" parody of the original.

== Reception ==
=== Ratings ===
The first part of "The Return of Harmony" aired on September 17, 2011, while the second part aired on September 24. The first part was viewed by over 339,000 viewers, making it one of the highest-rated episodes ever broadcast by The Hub. In addition, the first part received a 0.2 Nielsen household rating in the United States, meaning that it was seen by 0.2 percent of all households watching television at the time of the broadcast. The episode received a 0.1 18–49 rating, meaning that it was viewed by 0.1 percent of all 18- to 49-year-olds watching television at the time of broadcast. The episode was later beaten by "A Canterlot Wedding," which scored a total viewership of 483,000 and 475,000.

=== Reviews ===
Both parts of the episode received critical praise. In a review of the first part, Carina Belles from We Got This Covered called the series "plain awesome", saying that it is "basically Lord of the Rings, only with ponies". Belles praised the expressing animation, writing "the already incredible art has also improved, with a wider variety of styles being used". A review from Republibot of the first part of the episode called the plot "an interesting revisit of the premise of the pilot [Friendship Is Magic]". Furthermore, the review called John de Lancie's performance "superb" and praised the animation. Reviews for part two were positive as well. Republibot gave the episode a largely positive review, however, the site did note that the episode "feels a bit rushed, even as a two-parter", and that "Fluttershy's and Rarity's restoration sequences in particular feel rushed and inadvertently echo [the mind wipe sequences from] Men in Black."

Many reviews praised the series' pop culture references. Carina Belles applauded the series for making pop culture references, citing Pinkie Pie's mention of "Chocolate Rain", a reference to the Internet meme. Many reviews and critics positively commented on the episode's ending, which featured a parody of the closing scenes to the original Star Wars. Cyriaque Lamar from i09 wrote positively of the scene, writing, "Honestly, modern My Little Pony fandom is one of those things I'm live-and-let-live about, even though it baffles me entirely [but] this morning's episode of the show did a little homage to A New Hope." i09 later named the scene one of "The Best Television Moments of 2011". John Farrier from Neatorama wrote, "It's hard for Bronies to get respect from some quarters, but [the closing Star Wars parody] scene alone says much in favor of the show." The entertainment site Dorkly, an affiliate of CollegeHumor, featured a video comparing the two scenes and wrote, "May the adorable be with you." Topless Robot writer Anne Mathews named the Star Wars parody the "Nerdiest Easter Egg" in My Little Pony: Friendship Is Magic, writing, "This scene is a direct shoutout to the fans and completely cements the creator Lauren Faust's geek cred. The only thing missing is a Wookiee yell at the end!"

== Home media release ==
The two-part episode was part of the Season 2 DVD set, released by Shout Factory on May 14, 2013. It was also part of the "Cutie Mark Quests" DVD, released on June 30, 2015, alongside "The Show Stoppers" and the two-part season five premiere episode "The Cutie Map" (labelled as "Cutie Markless").
