= The Last Roundup (My Little Pony: Friendship Is Magic) =

- My Little Pony: Friendship Is Magic episode
- The Mane Six get jobs at Cherry Jubilee's (bottom left) factory.
- Episode no.: Season 2 Episode 14
- Written by: Amy Keating Rogers
- Original air dates: January 21, 2012 (original dub); February 24, 2012 (re-dub)
- Running time: 22 minutes

Episode chronology
← Previous "Baby Cakes"	Next → "The Super Speedy Cider Squeezy 6000"
- My Little Pony: Friendship Is Magic season 2

"The Last Roundup" is the fourteenth episode of the second season of the animated television series My Little Pony: Friendship Is Magic. The episode was written by Amy Keating Rogers. It originally aired on The Hub on January 21, 2012. In this episode, Applejack travels to the Equestria Rodeo competition to win prize money for repairing Ponyville's town hall, but when she fails to return home, her friends must track her down to discover why she is avoiding them.

== Plot ==
External videos
- The Last Roundup (full episode) — Official upload of the episode onto YouTube

Applejack departs for the prestigious Equestria Rodeo competition in Canterlot amid great fanfare from Ponyville, with Mayor Mare publicly thanking her in advance for the expected prize money that will fund repairs to the deteriorating town hall. Applejack promises to make everyone proud before boarding the train.

A week passes as Applejack's friends prepare a celebratory party at Sweet Apple Acres, only to receive a shocking telegram announcing that Applejack will not be returning home, although she promises to eventually send money back to Ponyville. Worried, the rest of the Mane Six decide to track down Applejack and discover what happened. Their investigation leads them first to Canterlot and then to the remote frontier town of Dodge Junction, where they discover Applejack working as a laborer on Cherry Jubilee's fruit plantation. When confronted, Applejack claims she simply wanted "a change of scenery" but refuses to provide any real explanation for abandoning her family and friends back home. Her friends take jobs at the same cherry processing facility and persistently question her while working, but their interrogation only makes Applejack more defensive and evasive.

Frustrated by Applejack's stubborn silence, Pinkie Pie follows her around and chatters incessantly about nonsensical topics until Applejack agrees to reveal everything the next morning in exchange for peace and quiet. However, Applejack attempts to flee town before dawn to avoid keeping her promise, and her friends pursue her by wagon until a near-miss with a speeding locomotive forces the confrontation to its climax.

Cornered and defeated after spilling a collection of second and third-place ribbons from her saddlebag, Applejack confesses that she failed to win any prize money at the rodeo and felt too humiliated to face her friends and family after making such confident promises. Her friends reassure her that athletic defeats do not diminish her worth as a person or friend, and that running away from disappointment only creates bigger problems than confronting failure with the support of those who care.

== Controversy ==
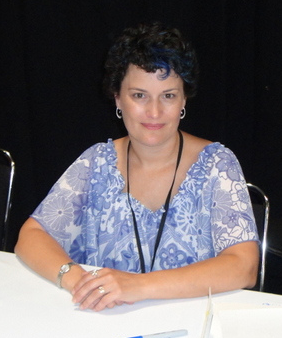
Episode writer Amy Keating Rogers

"The Last Roundup" became the center of controversy colloquially referred to as "Derpygate" within the My Little Pony: Friendship Is Magic fandom. The episode marked the first speaking role for the fan-favorite background character Derpy Hooves, who was addressed by name by Rainbow Dash and depicted with crossed eyes, a clumsy demeanor, and a distinctive voice provided by Tabitha St. Germain. Writer Amy Keating Rogers had been specifically asked to change the character's name from the originally planned "Ditzy" to "Derpy" as a tribute to the show's adult fanbase. While the episode initially generated celebration among fans, criticism soon emerged regarding the character's portrayal. Jenna Pitman created a petition on Change.org titled "Make Amends for Hurtful Ableist Stereotype in My Little Pony," which described the episode as perpetuating harmful stereotypes about people with disabilities. The petition argued that Derpy's voice, mannerisms, and name constituted "a very hurtful, pro-bullying message" and compared her speech to "that slow, loopy and lispy drawl we have all heard others use as an insult." The petition ultimately collected 136 signatures.

In response, several counter-petitions appeared defending the character, with Andrew Holt's "Hasbro Studios/The Hub: Do not change Derpy's name" garnering 44,395 signatures. Rogers herself received approximately 200 positive messages and 10 negative ones calling her an "ableist." Upon researching the term "derpy" further, Rogers discovered it could mean retarded in addition to awkward, which distressed her as the mother of a disabled child and disability rights advocate. Hasbro and The Hub ultimately decided to modify the episode. It was removed from iTunes on January 30, 2012, and a revised version was released on February 24, 2012, with Derpy's voice re-recorded in a higher pitch, her eyes straightened, and Rainbow Dash no longer addressing her by name. This decision itself generated significant backlash within the brony fandom, with some fans viewing it as censorship and corporate capitulation to a vocal minority.

== Reception ==
Sherilyn Connelly, the author of Ponyville Confidential, gave the episode a "D" rating. In her review of the episode in SF Weekly, Connelly wrote that while the episode "starts strong, but there's a lot of filler, and the parts never quite add up to a satisfying whole."

In a critical analysis of the episode, author Jen A. Blue described "The Last Roundup" as "simply not engaging" and criticized it for feeling like a rehash of the Season 1 episode "Applebuck Season" with the same lesson about trusting friends. Blue argued that the episode contained problematic implications about friendship dynamics: the other ponies' pursuit of Applejack constituted "a claim of ownership" over her and represented "an attempt to control another, and prevent them from being able to make their own decisions." Blue connected this to research by author Rachel Simmons about adolescent girls being told that "nothing is more important than friendship and niceness", and wrote that the episode reinforced toxic narratives that girls must put friendship above all other priorities. Blue questioned why Applejack's departure was treated differently from other characters' career opportunities, writing that the episode failed to provide a lesson for the other ponies about letting go, and concluded that it represented "yet another case of a common toxic narrative seeping from the larger culture, apparently unintentionally, into a mediocre episode."

Keith Veronese of Gizmodo called "The Last Roundup" "the most ominous cartoon episode title ever". Anime Superhero News called the episode "another solid one" and praised Applejack's character development, writing that "it was great to see Applejack have a real conflict in her life." Republibot praised the episode as "a good one" and commended the exploration of Applejack's pride and stubbornness from a new angle. The review noted that the episode was "well received, especially by Applejack fans" and highlighted the effective foreshadowing during Applejack's practice session.

Brendan Kachel of flayrah wrote that the episode was "the worst episode of season two" and criticized it for lacking entertainment value despite featuring the popular character Derpy. He acknowledged the controversy surrounding Derpy's portrayal but defended the character, calling the criticism "political correctness run amok" akin to Speedy Gonzales's portrayal (who was initially censored by Cartoon Network, but was deemed a cultural icon by the League of United Latin American Citizens), and noted that while the setups for gags were great, there was ultimately little payoff.

Johnnie Jungleguts of Yahoo! Entertainment ranked "The Last Roundup" the seventh best episode of My Little Pony and wrote that the episode "shares its name with a mournful country-western tune about a cowboy's departure to heaven, and escape is also the subject matter here." Jungleguts explained that while many episodes focus on ponies being nervous about upcoming events, "The Last Roundup" stands apart by being "about coping when you think you've failed," as Applejack disappears after competing in the Equestria Rodeo for reasons obvious to anyone but her friends.

Hillary Busis of Entertainment Weekly identified the scene where the Mane Six get jobs at Cherry Jubilee's cherry factory as a reference to the famous chocolate factory scene from I Love Lucy.

== Home media release ==
The episode was part of the Season 2 DVD set, released by Shout! Factory on May 14, 2013.

== See also ==
- List of My Little Pony: Friendship Is Magic episodes
- "Bridle Gossip"
- Derpy Hooves
