= M. A. Larson =

American screenwriter and author

Mitch Larson
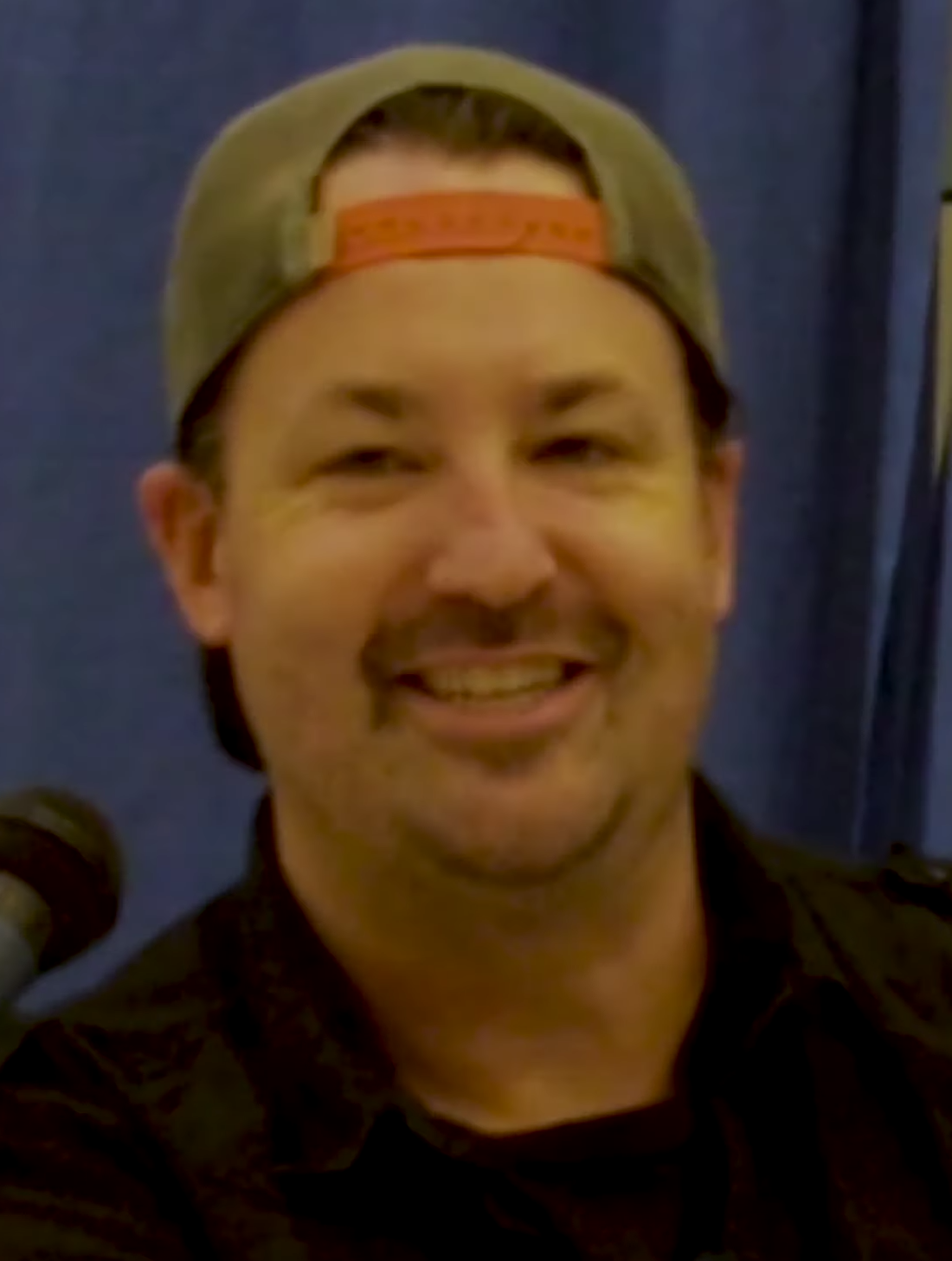
- Larson at BronyCon in 2019
- Born: Mitchell Aaron Larson; August 3, 1976 (age 50); Burnsville, Minnesota, U.S.
- Occupations: Author, screenwriter, lyricist, story editor
- Writing career
- Pen name: M. A. Larson; Mitchell Larson
- Years active: 2005–present
- Notable work: My Little Pony: Friendship Is Magic

Mitchell Aaron Larson (born August 3, 1976 in Burnsville, Minnesota) is an American screenwriter and author. Larson has written for several animated series, including Foster's Home for Imaginary Friends, My Gym Partner's a Monkey, Growing Up Creepie, Kick Buttowski: Suburban Daredevil, Gravity Falls, Littlest Pet Shop, SuperKitties, Cow Squad and most notably My Little Pony: Friendship Is Magic. Depending on which series he is working on, he is credited as either Mitch Larson, M. A. Larson (in My Little Pony: Friendship Is Magic, DC Super Hero Girls and Cow Squad), and Mitchell Larson (rarely).

Larson had become interested in My Little Pony: Friendship Is Magic from previously working with Lauren Faust, the series' original showrunner, on Foster's Home; he was surprised by her characterization of the main characters and started writing for the show. Larson became a popular figure within the latter show's adult and teenage fanbase of "bronies" and has become a frequent guest at various conventions. He also wrote lyrics of a few songs on both Friendship Is Magic and Littlest Pet Shop, and acted as story editor during the fifth season of Friendship Is Magic. He is credited with writing various notable episodes on the show, including "The Cutie Mark Chronicles", "The Return of Harmony", "Magic Duel", "Magical Mystery Cure", "The Cutie Map", "Slice of Life", and "Amending Fences".

In November 2014, Larson's first novel, Pennyroyal Academy, was published under his M. A. Larson moniker.

== Work on My Little Pony: Friendship Is Magic ==
M. A. Larson is most well-known for his work on My Little Pony: Friendship Is Magic, an animated television series that ran from 2010–2019 and served as the primary television adaptation of the fourth incarnation of Hasbro's My Little Pony toyline. The show's developer, Lauren Faust, had previously worked with Larson on Foster's Home for Imaginary Friends and Larson subsequently became involved with Friendship Is Magic. He worked on the show up until 2016, though the last episode written under his name aired in 2017.

=== List of episodes written by M. A. Larson ===
Larson is credited as the writer for the following episodes of Friendship Is Magic:

- "Swarm of the Century"
- "Sonic Rainboom"
- "The Cutie Mark Chronicles"
- "The Return of Harmony"
- "Luna Eclipsed"
- "Secret of My Excess"
- "The Super Speedy Cider Squeezy 6000"
- "It's About Time"
- "Ponyville Confidential"
- "Magic Duel"
- "Magical Mystery Cure"
- "The Cutie Map"
- "Slice of Life"
- "Amending Fences"
- "Fame and Misfortune"

Additionally, Larson is credited for the story of "Rarity Investigates!".

== Pennyroyal Academy ==
Larson wrote Pennyroyal Academy which was published in November 2014 by Putnam. Larson was influenced by what he called "princess fatigue" in the popular culture during his time writing for Cartoon Network shows. Brainstorming from this, he considered a children's work where many different princesses would be together in one place, dealing with having to live together. He originally called it Princess Boot Camp, where the princess characters would undergo rigorous training in a parody of a military-like boot camp approach. As he began developing the book, he had read The Uses of Enchantment by Bruno Bettelheim, which analyzed works like Grimms' Fairy Tales using Freudian psychology and concluded that the darker elements of these stories enable children to help develop their emotions. Inspired by this analysis, Larson revamped his work over a six-year period to target a slightly older audience with scarier elements and with less humor. The resulting book became Pennyroyal Academy, which centers on school for budding princesses and knights that train to fight approaching armies led by evil witches. Larson noted that his experience with the characters of Friendship Is Magic resonated in his approach with Pennyroyal Academy.

Pennyroyal Academy was well received by critics; the New York Times's Julie Klam called the work a "breathtakingly exciting novel", and despite the comparison to Harry Potter, felt the work stood on its own. Prior to publication, the work was picked up by Reese Witherspoon's production company, Pacific Standard, for a film adaption. Witherspoon, in her decision to pick up the work, stated that "there is a princess story that reflects the values young women truly want to embody … These princesses are strong, independent and fierce, and the knights are their match. In telling their story, Larson has created a magical universe that everyone will love to get lost in."

Larson has since written two sequels, The Shadow Cadets of Pennyroyal Academy (2016) and The Warrior Princess of Pennyroyal Academy (2017).
