= Lesson Zero =

- My Little Pony: Friendship Is Magic episode
- Twilight Sparkle, unable to find a friendship problem to solve, goes insane.
- Episode no.: Season 2 Episode 3
- Directed by: Jayson Thiessen; James Wootton
- Written by: Meghan McCarthy
- Original air date: October 15, 2011
- Running time: 22 minutes

Episode chronology
← Previous "The Return of Harmony"	Next → "Luna Eclipsed"
- My Little Pony: Friendship Is Magic season 2

"Lesson Zero" is the third episode of the second season of the animated television series My Little Pony: Friendship Is Magic. The episode was written by Meghan McCarthy. It originally aired on The Hub on October 15, 2011. In this episode, after Twilight Sparkle realizes that she hasn't written a weekly friendship report to Princess Celestia, she tries to create a problem so that she can write one.

== Plot ==
External videos
- Lesson Zero (full episode) — Official upload of the episode onto YouTube

At the Golden Oak Library, Twilight Sparkle realizes with horror that she has not sent her weekly friendship report to Princess Celestia and becomes convinced that missing the deadline will result in her being sent back to "magic kindergarten" in Canterlot. Determined to resolve a friendship problem before sundown, she heads outside to search for a friendship issue among her friends but finds none available. At a picnic with the Mane Six, when Twilight explains her concern about the late letter, her friends dismiss her worries and advise her to stop being anxious, frustrating her enough to teleport away. Desperate, Twilight decides to create one artificially by offering her childhood doll Smarty Pants to the Cutie Mark Crusaders.

When the Crusaders argue about not wanting to play with the doll rather than fighting over it, Twilight casts a spell that makes Smarty Pants irresistibly desirable to anyone who looks at it. The fillies immediately begin fighting over the doll, but when Twilight tries to retrieve it with Big McIntosh's help, he also falls under the spell and runs off with it, causing a town-wide stampede and brawl. Princess Celestia arrives as the sun sets and neutralizes the spell before instructing Twilight to meet her at the library.

Inside the Golden Oak Library, Princess Celestia (having received a letter by Spike) reassures Twilight that submitting friendship reports late does not reflect poorly on her as a student, while the other friends confess their earlier indifference to Twilight's concerns. Celestia forgives Twilight on the condition that all of the Mane Six can now submit friendship reports when they discover lessons.

== Reception ==
Sherilyn Connelly, the author of Ponyville Confidential, gave the episode an "A+" rating, and called it a "great episode". In her review of the episode in SF Weekly, Connelly remarked that starting from this episode, the show's format changed to allow any of the Mane Six to write friendship reports (which she affectionately called a shoehorn) to Princess Celestia.

In a critical analysis of the episode, author Jen A. Blue described "Lesson Zero" as one of her favorite episodes of the entire series and praised both the animation quality—especially Twilight's facial expressions—and Tara Strong's vocal performance, which she noted escalated naturally from worry to "complete freakout" before returning to a subdued tone when Princess Celestia appears. Blue analyzed the episode as a follow-up to the narrative collapse of "The Return of Harmony", arguing that the title "Lesson Zero" refers not to an absence of a lesson, but to a fundamental lesson that must precede all friendship lessons. She interpreted the core lesson as being about recognizing the subjectivity of others, arguing that the other characters' failure to take Twilight's concerns seriously constituted a form of objectification. Blue wrote that this lesson about respecting others' different perspectives and needs was fundamental enough to facilitate the show's format change, which enables any of the Mane Six to learn and document friendship lessons rather than restricting this role to Twilight alone.

Twilight, realizing that she is unable to write a friendship report to Celestia, exclaims "I'll be... tardy!" with a sunburst background that appears behind her, which is then wheeled off screen by Spike. Aaron Kashtan identified this fourth wall break as an example of Friendship Is Magic's use of metatextuality.

In an essay analyzing the use of metatextuality in Friendship Is Magic, Aaron Kashtan examined how "Lesson Zero" features instances of fourth-wall breaking, despite the show's creators originally intending such moments to be exclusive to Pinkie Pie's character. He identified a specific scene where Twilight Sparkle exclaims "If I don't send [Princess Celestia] a letter by sundown, I'll be... tardy!" accompanied by a red sunburst background that appears behind her, which is then revealed to be a physical prop when Spike wheels it out of the frame. Kashtan wrote that through such uses of metatextuality and reflexivity, the episode reminds viewers of the show's status as a constructed media artifact, thereby helping develop critical awareness of mediacy and materiality.

Brendan Kachel of flayrah described "Lesson Zero" as "a pretty good Season 2 episode," though he noted it suffered from similarities to "Party of One", writing that "It's basically the same, except its Twilight Sparkle going creepily insane over a tiny misunderstanding instead of Pinkie Pie. Pinkie Pie did it first, and did it better."

Raymond Gallant of Freakin' Awesome Network gave the episode a rating of 8.5 out of 10 and called it "easily one of the best episodes of the series so far," praising Twilight's descent into madness from her obsessive-compulsive disorder as "very fun to see" and noting how it demonstrated "just how many dimensions these characters truly have." Despite criticizing the rushed pacing and Rainbow Dash being "far too overpowered," Gallant wrote that the episode "easily proved that the show is still easily in good hands" following Lauren Faust's departure as executive producer.

Anime Superhero News called "Lesson Zero" "a great and well done episode," praising the setup, animation, visuals, and pacing, but also criticized some exaggerated comedic elements as "forced" and a running gag involving Rarity as being out of character. The review nevertheless recommended the episode and praised the ending's setup involving friendship letters for providing greater creative freedom.

Republibot praised Twilight's characterization, writing that her intensity was "dialed up to eleven" and she "outdoes even Pinkie Pie in desperate insanity" from "Party of One", while noting that unlike Pinkie, Twilight remained logical despite her moral compass falling apart. The review questioned how the episode would play with its target demographic of young girls, describing it as "somewhat disturbing even for adults to watch," and praised Princess Celestia's amended instructions as giving the writers more flexibility for future episodes.

"Lesson Zero" is one of the highest rated Friendship Is Magic episodes on IMDb, with a rating of 9.0 out of 10.

== Home media release ==
The two-part episode was part of the Season 2 DVD set, released by Shout Factory on May 14, 2013.

== See also ==
- List of My Little Pony: Friendship Is Magic episodes
