= WomenWriteAboutComics =

Comic book website

WWAC
- Website type: Comic book
- Available in: English
- Creator: Megan Purdy
- Editors: Nola Pfau and Wendy Browne
- Website: www.womenwriteaboutcomics.com
- Launched: December 2011
- Current status: Online

WomenWriteAboutComics (WWAC) is a comic book website, founded in December 2011 by Megan Purdy. The site has been nominated four times for an Eisner Award, winning three back-to-back from 2020-2022. As of 2022, the site is run by Wendy Browne and Nola Pfau.

== History ==
WWAC was originally published by Purdy as a WordPress blog, with writer Claire Napier joining as a co-editor early into its existence. The blog was set up with the stated agenda to feature a diverse group of intersectional, international feminists who provide equally diverse insight into the world of comic book culture and the comic book industry at large. In 2012, a post inviting comic bloggers to write about the women in refrigerators superhero comic-book trope gained widespread attention

The intersectional feminist style of the website and its contributors has led to it being used as a source by several publications including The New York Times, Vulture, and Mother Jones.

In 2017 Purdy stepped down from their role as editor, with Napier following shortly afterwards. In the following year, Nola Pfau and Wendy Browne took over the site as Editor-in-Chief and Publisher, respectively.

The site features reviews, reports on mainstream and local conventions, comic book-inspired recipes and crafts, feature essays discussing socio-political happenings in and around the comic book industry, and interviews with members of the comics community.

The website has been archived by the Library of Congress.

== Comics Academe ==
Comics Academe is an ongoing series published monthly on WWAC since 2015, originally curated by Francesca Lyn, a PhD Candidate from the Department of Media, Art, and Text at Virginia Commonwealth University. Since 2017, Comics Academe has been curated by Katherine Tanski, a PhD Candidate in Rhetoric and Composition from Purdue University. Tanski was joined in 2020 by Adrienne Resha, a PhD Candidate in American Studies from the College of William & Mary.

Comics Academe has garnered international attention from scholars in comics studies, including Rutgers University Press as one of the few curated spaces for public-facing scholarship available for women and non-binary individuals who have a scholarly interest in comics studies.

== Awards and nominations ==
- 2017 Eisner Award nomination for "Best Comics-Related Periodical/Journalism"
- 2020 Gilbert Seldes Prize for Public Scholarship for "4 Colorism: The Ashiness of It All" by Zoë D. Smith
- 2020 Eisner Award win for "Best Comics-Related Periodical/Journalism"
- 2021 Eisner Award win for "Best Comics-Related Periodical/Journalism"
- 2022 Eisner Award win for "Best Comics-Related Periodical/Journalism"
