= Amy Keating Rogers =

American screenwriter (born 1969)

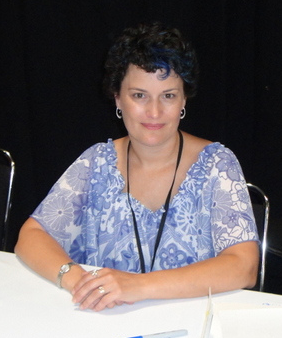
- Rogers at the 2012 Summer BronyCon Convention
- Born: June 17, 1969 (age 57); Los Angeles, California, U.S.
- Education: Occidental College, California Institute of the Arts
- Occupations: Television producer and writer
- Spouse: Aaron Rogers
- Children: 2
- Writing career
- Years active: 1996–present

Amy Keating Rogers (born June 17, 1969) is an American television writer who has contributed to several notable animated television series and films, including episodes of The Powerpuff Girls and My Little Pony: Friendship Is Magic. She has been nominated for four Primetime Emmy Awards. In 2009, Rogers directed the documentary film Jason Bateman Thinks I'm Dead, which chronicles her attempts to re-establish contact with actor Jason Bateman, one of her classmates in elementary school. On April 27, 2015, she became a full-time writer at Disney.

== Personal life ==
Rogers has a husband Aaron, with whom she has two children, Moira and Soren Rogers.

== Filmography ==
- Pocoyo (2025) (TV) (writer)
- Lyla in the Loop (2024) (TV) (guest writer)
- SuperKitties (2023) (TV) (writer)
- T.O.T.S. (2019–2020) (TV) (writer)
- Ben 10: Omniverse (2014) (writer)
- #TweetIt: Featuring My Little Pony Staff and Bronies (2014)
- PAW Patrol (2013) (TV) (guest writer)
- Bronies: The Extremely Unexpected Adult Fans of My Little Pony (2013) (herself)
- Care Bears: Welcome to Care-a-Lot (2012) (TV) (story editor)
- My Little Pony: Friendship Is Magic (2010–2012; 2014–2015) (TV) (writer)
- The Fairly OddParents (2008–2009) (TV) (story) (writer)
- Danny Phantom (2007) (TV) (writer, "D-Stabilized")
- My Life as a Teenage Robot (2005) (TV) (writer)
- Foster's Home for Imaginary Friends (2004–2005) (TV) (story) (writer)
- The Powerpuff Girls: 'Twas The Fight Before Christmas (2003) (outline editor)
- The Powerpuff Girls Movie (2002) (story)
- Samurai Jack (2001–2004) (TV) (outline editor)
- Grim & Evil (2001) (TV) (writer)
- Dexter's Laboratory: Ego Trip (1999) (story)
- The Powerpuff Girls (1998–2004) (TV) (story) (outline editor) (writer) (head writer) (production coordinator)
- Johnny Bravo (1997–2004) (TV) (writer: story) (unit production assistant)
- Dexter's Laboratory (1996) (TV) (story)
