= Crusaders of the Lost Mark =

- My Little Pony: Friendship Is Magic episode
- After earning their cutie marks, the Cutie Mark Crusaders lead a parade through Ponyville to celebrate their accomplishments
- Episode no.: Season 5 Episode 18
- Directed by: Denny Lu; Jim Miller
- Written by: Amy Keating Rogers
- Original air date: October 10, 2015

Guest appearance
- Graham Verchere as Pipsqueak

Episode chronology
← Previous "Brotherhooves Social"	Next → "The One Where Pinkie Pie Knows"
- My Little Pony: Friendship Is Magic season 5

"Crusaders of the Lost Mark" is the eighteenth episode of the fifth season of the animated television series My Little Pony: Friendship Is Magic. Written by Amy Keating Rogers, it is one of four musical episodes in the series, alongside "Magical Mystery Cure", "Pinkie Pride", and "A Hearth's Warming Tail". The episode aired on October 10, 2015, on Discovery Family. It is among the highest-rated Friendship Is Magic episodes. Its title is based on the 1981 film Raiders of the Lost Ark.

== Plot ==
The episode follows the Cutie Mark Crusaders as they continue searching for their cutie marks. They end up as the campaign managers for Pipsqueak, who is running for student pony president. Pipsqueak's opponent is the Cutie Mark Crusaders' longtime rival, Diamond Tiara.

Diamond Tiara loses the election and is heavily criticized by her mother, Spoiled Rich, afterwards, causing the Crusaders to sympathize with her. They invite Diamond Tiara to their clubhouse and allow her to redeem herself. After some internal conflict, Diamond Tiara stands up to her mother and helps Pipsqueak rebuild the school playground. The Crusaders agree to stop searching for their cutie marks and instead work together as friends to help other ponies understand their special talents, which causes the three to get near-identical cutie marks together. They then celebrate the accomplishment with their friends and family.

== Production ==
=== Featured songs ===
Being one of Friendship Is Magic's four musical episodes, "Crusaders of the Lost Mark" features six songs, all of which were composed by Daniel Ingram. One of the songs in the episode, "The Pony I Want to Be" is included in the album Pinkie Pie's Party Playlist.

1. "We'll Make Our Mark (Prelude)"
2. "The Vote"
3. "The Pony I Want to Be"
4. "Light of Your Cutie Mark"
5. "The Pony I Want to Be (Reprise)"
6. "We'll Make Our Mark"

== Broadcast and reception ==
The episode aired on October 10, 2015, on Discovery Family to 299,000 viewers.

According to IMDb, "Crusaders of the Lost Mark" is the sixth highest rated episode of My Little Pony: Friendship Is Magic with a 9.2/10, following "Slice of Life" and followed by "Amending Fences". Daniel Alvarez of the website Unleash the Fanboy called the episode "a masterpiece" and among the most memorable in the series.

At the 2016 Leo Awards, Daniel Ingram was nominated for and won the award for "Musical Score Animation Program or Series" because of the songs he composed "Crusaders of the Lost Mark".

=== Picture book adaptation ===
A picture book adaptation of the episode titled My Little Pony: Crusaders of the Lost Mark, written by Magnolia Belle, was released on February 9, 2016.

== Home media release ==
"Crusaders of the Lost Mark" was released as part of the complete Season 5 DVD set.
