= List of My Little Pony: Friendship Is Magic characters =

A 2011 Comic-Con poster depicting many characters from the first season

This is a list of characters from My Little Pony: Friendship Is Magic, an animated television series based on the My Little Pony toyline created by American toy manufacturer and multimedia company Hasbro. The series features characters and settings developed by Lauren Faust, who sought to create more in-depth characters than the stereotypical "girly" icons used in previous iterations of the franchise. The series premiered on October 10, 2010, in the United States and concluded on October 12, 2019.

The characters have been generally well-received by television critics and parental groups and are cited as one of the reasons the series' older fans, called "bronies", became attracted to the show. Friendship is Magic characters appear in numerous spin-off franchise media, including a comic book series, a Gameloft My Little Pony video game, a children's book series, a theatrical feature film, and My Little Pony: Pony Life, a reboot focusing on more slice-of-life stories.

== Creation and conception ==
Hasbro initially hired Faust to create a pitch bible for the show, allowing her to get additional help with conceptualization. Faust said she was "extremely skeptical" about taking the job at first because she had always found shows based on girls' toys to be boring and unrelatable. She was disappointed that what she thought of the toys at the time was nothing like the animated shows, in which the characters, according to her, "had endless tea parties, giggled over nothing and defeated villains by either sharing with them or crying". With the chance to work on My Little Pony, one of her favorite childhood toys, she hoped to prove that "cartoons for girls don't have to be a puddle of smooshy, cutesy-wootsy, goody-two-shoeness". To do this, she incorporated many elements into the show that subverted stereotypes of girls, such as diverse personalities, character flaws and personality disorders, the message that friends can be different and can get into arguments but still be friends and the idea that girls should not be limited by what others say they can or cannot do. Elements of the characters' personalities and the show's settings were based on her childhood imagination of the ponies' adventures, in part inspired by the animated shows that her brothers would watch while growing up, such as Transformers and G.I. Joe. Faust still aimed for the characters to be "relatable" characters, using stereotypical "icons of girliness" to broaden the appeal of the characters for the young female audience.

== Appearances ==
Character	Voice actor	My Little Pony: Friendship Is Magic								
Character	Voice actor	1	2	3	4	5	6	7	8	9
Main characters
M Main R Recurring G Guest
Twilight Sparkle	Tara Strong	M	M	M	M	M	M	M	M	M
Applejack	Ashleigh Ball	M	M	M	M	M	M	M	M	M
Rainbow Dash	Ashleigh Ball	M	M	M	M	M	M	M	M	M
Pinkie Pie	Andrea Libman	M	M	M	M	M	M	M	M	M
Rarity	Tabitha St. Germain	M	M	M	M	M	M	M	M	M
Fluttershy	Andrea Libman	M	M	M	M	M	M	M	M	M
Spike	Cathy Weseluck	M	M	M	M	M	M	M	M	M
Recurring characters
R Recurring G Guest
Princess Celestia	Nicole Oliver	R	R	R	R	R	R	R	R	R
Princess Luna	Tabitha St. Germain	R	R	R	R	R	R	R	R	R
Apple Bloom	Michelle Creber	R	R	R	R	R	R	R	R	R
Sweetie Belle	Claire Corlett	R	R	R	R	R	R	R	R	R
Scootaloo	Madeleine Peters	R	R	R	R	R	R	R	R	R
Granny Smith	Tabitha St. Germain	R	R	R	R	R	R	R	R	R
Big McIntosh	Peter New	R	R	R	R	R	R	R	R	R
Princess Cadance	Britt McKillip		R	R	R	R	R	R	R	R
Prince Shining Armor	Andrew Francis		R	R	R	R	R	R	R	R
Princess Flurry Heart	Tabitha St. Germain						R	R	R	R
Discord	John de Lancie		R	R	R	R	R	R	R	R
Diamond Tiara	Chantal Strand	R	R	R	R	R				
Silver Spoon	Shannon Chan-Kent	R	R	R	R	R				
Trixie Lulamoon	Kathleen Barr	G		G			R	R	R	R
Zecora	Brenda Crichlow	R	R	G	R	G	G	G	G	G
Starlight Glimmer	Kelly Sheridan					G	R	R	R	R
Cozy Glow	Sunni Westbrook								R	G
Guest characters
G Guest
King Sombra	Alvin Sanders			G						G
Queen Chrysalis	Kathleen Barr		G				G		G	G
Lord Tirek	Mark Acheson				G				G	G
Cheese Sandwich	"Weird Al" Yankovic				G					G
Quibble Pants	Patton Oswalt						G			G
Aunt Holiday and Auntie Lofty	Jackie Blackmore and Saffron Henderson									G

= Main cast (credited; or speaking appearances in every episode for the season)
= Recurring cast (5+ speaking appearances for the season)
= Guest cast (1–4 speaking appearances for the season)

== Main characters ==
The main characters of Friendship is Magic (FiM) appears in numerous official "Generation 4" spin-off franchise media, including a comic book series, a Gameloft My Little Pony video game, a children's book series, a theatrical feature film, and two spinoff television films/television series: My Little Pony: Equestria Girls, a canon within the FiM universe reimagining the main characters as humanized magical girl alternative universe versions of themselves; and My Little Pony: Pony Life, a non-canon reboot comedy series featuring chibi (super deformed) versions of the main characters focusing on more slice-of-life stories.

=== Mane Six ===
My Little Pony: Friendship Is Magic focuses on six core pony characters, identified as the "Mane Six", a group of friends who are brought together by the "Elements of Harmony", a set of six mystical jewels and an "unstoppable force of good" used to defend Equestria against powerful threats. The seventh main character, Spike, acts as a foil to the Mane Six in terms of personality and he is the only male member of the team. Starlight is not a part of the Mane Six but redeems herself and becomes a special eighth member of the team.

Each pony character was designed to represent a different element and positive aspect of friendship: honesty (Applejack), kindness (Fluttershy), laughter (Pinkie Pie), generosity (Rarity), and loyalty (Rainbow Dash), which come together to form the sixth element of "magic" (Twilight Sparkle).

==== Twilight Sparkle ====
Twilight Sparkle (voiced by Tara Strong, singing voice by Rebecca Shoichet) is one of the main protagonists of the show. Her cutie mark, a six-pointed star, represents her talent for magic and her love for books and knowledge and the five smaller stars indicate that her destiny is intertwined with her friends. Twilight is depicted in the first three seasons as a light purple unicorn with purple eyes and a pink and purple streaked indigo-blue mane and tail and as an alicorn after "Magical Mystery Cure". Twilight is an intellectual member of the group who leads them during their adventures and helps resolve her friends' differences.

Twilight's defining character trait is her humility. She is a natural-born leader, an intelligent and dutiful scholar, wise beyond her years, with an avid love of learning and scientific discoveries. Her specialty is advanced unicorn-specific magic; her proficiency in magic is stated to have rivaled that of Star Swirl the Bearded, having already mastered various advanced spells before her ascension to princesshood. Often rational and calm, she has perfectionist tendencies with severe paranoia and never accepts failure. She is also prone to suffer from nervous breakdowns (dubbed "Twilighting" and "Twilynanas" by her friends and family) when confronted with difficult problems or things beyond her understanding, though she gradually overcomes this habit in the final season.

Twilight begins the story as the protégée of Princess Celestia, who tasks her with studying the magical properties of friendship and reporting her findings with her companion and friend Spike. Twilight detests her assignment in the two-part series premiere, owing to her reclusiveness to her obsession with books, but comes to form strong friendships with the rest of the group, which she realizes is key to harnessing the Elements of Harmony. She resides with her assistant Spike and pet owl Owlowiscious in Ponyville's Golden Oak Library, where she also serves as town librarian. At the end of the third season, she finishes an old spell using what she had learned about friendship, which lead her to becoming an alicorn and a princess, while also graduating from her studies with Princess Celestia. At the end of the fourth season, she becomes the Princess of Friendship, with the responsibility to spread friendship and harmony across Equestria. In the eighth season, she opens the School of Friendship to teach ponies and creatures from Equestria and beyond about the benefits of friendship with her friends serving as the teachers. In the ninth season, she prepares to become the new ruler of Equestria succeeding Princess Celestia, which she accomplishes in the end.

==== Applejack ====
Applejack (voiced by Ashleigh Ball) is an orange Earth Pony with green eyes, a blonde mane and tail, and a cowboy hat which she rarely takes off. Her cutie mark, a trio of apples, represents her talent for agriculture and her love for her family. She is characterized as a "farm gal" who sports a cowboy hat and lasso and speaks with a Southern accent. She works as an apple farmer at the Sweet Apple Acres orchard in Ponyville, using her strength to "buck" apples out of trees. She lives with her grandmother Granny Smith (voiced by Tabitha St. Germain), her older brother Big McIntosh (voiced by Peter New), her younger sister Apple Bloom and her pet Border Collie dog Winona. Applejack's parents, Bright Mac and Pear Butter (voiced by Bill Newton and Felicia Day), first seen in "The Perfect Pear", are deceased. Applejack is honest, courageous, forthright and the most "down-to-earth" of the group, being a trustworthy friend who is optimistic and has good judgment. She is also "too eager to please" and has a stubborn persona, with several episodes focused on her interaction with the Flim-Flam Brothers who exploit her vulnerabilities or focus on her taking up a "herculean task".

==== Rainbow Dash ====
Rainbow Dash (voiced by Ashleigh Ball) is a light blue Pegasus with magenta eyes and a rainbow-colored mane and tail. Her cutie mark, a tomboy rainbow-colored lightning bolt with a cloud, represents her talent for speed and her obsession with adventure. Her goal at the beginning of the series is to join her "heroes", the elite Wonderbolts aerobatic team. She later joins the Wonderbolts as a trainee in "Wonderbolts Academy". She soon became a reservist in "Testing Testing 1, 2, 3" and then a full-time member in "Newbie Dash". She helps other pegasi manage the weather around Ponyville and spends her time practicing flight maneuvers such as the "Sonic Rainboom", a rainbow-colored sonic boom. In "The Cutie Mark Chronicles", Rainbow Dash's first Sonic Rainboom as a filly caused a chain of events that produced the group's cutie marks. She lives with a propeller-fitted pet tortoise named Tank in a floating condominium of clouds called the Cloudominium, which is sparingly seen in the show because she "doesn't sit still for very long", according to the director Jim Miller.

==== Pinkie Pie ====
Pinkie Pie (voiced by Andrea Libman, singing voice by Shannon Chan-Kent (Note: Libman provides Pinkie Pie's singing voice for some songs.)) is a light pink Earth Pony with light blue eyes and a dark pink balloon-like mane and tail. Her cutie mark, a trio of balloons, one yellow and two blue, represents her talent for spreading hope and joy and her desire to entertain her friends. She is a party planner at Sugarcube Corner, a bakery and confectionery store that resembles a gingerbread house and owns a toothless pet alligator named Gummy. A comic relief character who was raised on a "dreary rock farm", Pinkie is defined as a "hard worker" motivated in seeing people she loves smiling and relieving them of stress, by randomly throwing parties and acting as outlandish as possible; but has a lack of confidence and a fear of being rejected by others. Pinkie is a source of much of the series' humor and several of the show's "wacky gags" are kept exclusive to her (running gags include breaking the fourth wall and "appearing suddenly in unexpected places", as well as an ability to predict future events through various body reactions, which she calls the "Pinkie Sense"). While Pinkie appears to be the naive party animal of the group, she also displays admirable skills in science and engineering. In "Swarm of the Century", she devises a technical solution to Ponyville's infestation problems in a scenario where magic had failed and builds a flying machine to keep up with Rainbow Dash in "Griffon the Brush Off". In the future setting of the last episode "The Last Problem", Pinkie is shown to be married to Cheese Sandwich with a child named Li'l Cheese.

==== Rarity ====
Rarity (voiced by Tabitha St. Germain, singing voice by Kazumi Evans) is a white Unicorn with dark blue eyes and a curled indigo-purple mane and tail. Her cutie mark, a trio of light blue diamonds, represents her talent for prospecting gemstones and her love of art and beauty. Rarity is a svelte, sophisticated, ladylike fashionista and businessperson who speaks with a mid-Atlantic accent and runs a franchise of brand name flagship stores throughout Equestria; she operates out of an haute couture salon in Ponyville called Carousel Boutique. Despite her melodramatic tendencies, she has a generous spirit and loves spoiling her friends and strives to create artistic dresses that capture their wearers' inner beauty. She owns a pet Persian cat named Opalescence who is commonly nicknamed Opal and has a younger sister named Sweetie Belle.

==== Fluttershy ====
Fluttershy (voiced by Andrea Libman) is a yellow Pegasus with green-blue eyes and a pink mane and tail. Her cutie mark, a trio of pink butterflies with green-blue bodies, represents her talent as an animal caretaker and her love for nature. True to her name, she is defined by her "shy sweetness; soft, whispery voice and tender, nurturing nature", as described by author Begin. She possesses a unique affinity for animals that allows her to communicate with them. She lives in a secluded meadow cottage in Ponyville where she cares for forest creatures such as her "conniving and willful" pet rabbit Angel. In many episodes, Fluttershy exhibits a tough personality that emerges whenever a friend or animal is harmed, in contrast to her normally timid and mild-mannered self. Her most prominent ability, "the Stare", causes any creature that meets her gaze to become "powerless and moved to meekness" while it is in effect. In "Flutter Brutter", she demonstrates constant, often snarky assertiveness toward her slacker younger brother Zephyr Breeze (voiced by Ryan Beil).

==== Spike ====
Spike (voiced by Cathy Weseluck) is a purple baby Dragon with green spines. He was orphaned as an egg and hatched by Twilight as part of her entrance exam for Celestia's academy. He was also raised among Twilight's family as her adopted younger brother. Spike fulfills the role of Twilight's "number one assistant" to which he is named for his loyalty and skill at helping Twilight solve problems and learn lessons. He also has a crush on Rarity, an insatiable appetite for sparkly gems, and the ability to send letters via his fiery dragon breath. In "Molt Down", he gains a pair of wings after undergoing a developmental stage for dragons called the "molt". At the end of the show, he becomes Twilight's royal adviser. Spike acts as a foil to Twilight and her friends in terms of personality, size, and shape which "provides plenty of opportunity for exploring this difference in storylines".

== Supporting ==
=== Equestrian Royal Family ===
==== Princess Celestia ====
Princess Celestia (voiced by Nicole Oliver) is the benevolent ruler of Equestria and Twilight's former mentor. She has ruled Equestria for over a thousand years and uses her magic to raise the sun, while her younger sister Luna uses her magic to raise the moon to ensure a night and day cycle. She is perhaps the most beloved creature in Equestria, being a staunch proponent of international peace, kindness, and cooperation. Very little of her past before Celestia's victory over Discord is known, except that she and Luna discovered the Elements of Harmony. With these artifacts and their bearers, Princess Celestia has secured millennia-long, relative peace for a nation. Her status as a Alicorn is seen as a symbol of harmony between earth ponies, pegasi, and unicorns. She guided Twilight since she was a filly, leading to her eventual destiny as a princess of Equestria. Celestia remains a close friend and ally to Twilight after she gained a pair of wings and became a princess. During season nine, Celestia and Luna prepares to retire from ruling Equestria so that Twilight can take their place. At the end of the show, after Twilight was crowned the new ruler of Equestria, Celestia and Luna retired to Silver Shoals.

==== Princess Luna ====
Princess Luna (voiced by Tabitha St. Germain, singing voice by Kazumi Evans in "Twilight's Kingdom", and Aloma Steele in "A Hearth's Warming Tail" onwards) is Princess Celestia's younger sister who serves as the co-ruler of Equestria and uses her magic to raise the moon and safeguards her subjects' dreams during nighttime. A thousand years ago, Luna became bitter about everypony playing during the day while they sleep through the night and ignore her. Luna's bitterness transformed her into Nightmare Moon and she attempted to create eternal night all over Equestria. Celestia reluctantly used the Elements of Harmony to banish her to the moon and took responsibility for raising both the sun and the moon and maintaining harmony in Equestria. Nightmare Moon first appears in the first season's two-part premiere "Friendship Is Magic" when she escapes from the moon and attempts to carry out her plan. Twilight and her friends use the Elements of Harmony to defeat Nightmare Moon and turn her back into Luna, who reconciles with her sister and resumes her royal duties. During season nine, Luna and Celestia prepares to retire from ruling Equestria so that Twilight can take their place. At the end of the show, after Twilight was crowned the new ruler of Equestria, Luna and Celestia retired to Silver Shoals.

==== Shining Armor, Princess Cadance and Flurry Heart ====
Shining Armor (voiced by Andrew Francis) is Twilight's older brother and the former captain of the Canterlot Royal Guard and Princess Cadance (voiced by Britt McKillip) is Twilight's sister-in-law and childhood "foal-sitter", whom she has close relationships with. They first appear in season two's two-part finale, "A Canterlot Wedding", when they were getting married. Later in season three, they became the new rulers of the Crystal Empire defeating King Sombra, with the responsibility of using the Crystal Heart to spread hope and love across Equestria. In season six, Cadance gives birth to their baby daughter with wings and a horn, Flurry Heart (voiced by Tabitha St. Germain). Princess Celestia and Princess Luna both stated that "the birth of [a winged unicorn] is something Equestria has never seen" and that it was "even beyond their understanding". Cadance does not know who her real parents were, she was found as a foal by two elderly earth ponies and they raised her until Princess Celestia adopted her as her unofficial niece after gaining her cutie mark and ascending into princesshood. Shining is depicted as handsome, courageous, silly, nerdy, and charming; while Cadance is depicted as kind, caring, helpful, romantic and natural as a leader.

=== The Cutie Mark Crusaders ===
The Cutie Mark Crusaders are a club that consists of Apple Bloom, Applejack and Big McIntosh's younger sister, Sweetie Belle, Rarity's younger sister, and Scootaloo, a pegasus filly who suffers from an inability to fly and idolizes Rainbow Dash. After the fillies befriended each other and formed the club in "Call of the Cutie", they went on adventures while trying to discover their special talents and earn their cutie marks. Later in "Crusaders of the Lost Mark", they finally earned their cutie marks, with their talents to help ponies discover their own purposes. In "Marks for Effort", they became tutors for the School of Friendship.

==== Apple Bloom ====
Apple Bloom (voiced by Michelle Creber) – Applejack and Big McIntosh's sassy younger sister who formulates and spearheads most of the Cutie Mark Crusaders' "missions".

==== Sweetie Belle ====
Sweetie Belle (voiced by Claire Corlett, singing voice for seasons 1-3 by Michelle Creber) – Rarity's kindhearted and innocent younger sister who has "a blossoming talent for singing" and strives to become a fashion designer and gain Rarity's approval, while living with her parents.

==== Scootaloo ====
Scootaloo (voiced by Madeleine Peters, singing voice for seasons 8-9 by Arielle Tuliao) – A pegasus filly who suffers from an inability to fly and instead uses her wings to propel her specially fashioned scooter. She idolizes Rainbow Dash as an older sister figure, as well as the president of the "Wonderbolt Dash" fan club, and often tries to imitate Rainbow Dash's attitude and athletic skill; Rainbow Dash loves and mentors Scootaloo, calling her the "most awesome kid sister ever". Scootaloo lives with her Aunt Holiday and Auntie Lofty (voiced by Jackie Blackmore and Saffron Henderson) while her parents Snap Shutter and Mane Allgood (voiced by Bill Newton and Emily Tennant) are world-traveling adventurers who study exotic plants and creatures for the advancement of science and medicine.

==== Honorary members ====
In addition to the main trio, others are accepted into the Cutie Mark Crusaders across the series:

- Babs Seed (voiced by Brynna Drummond) – A "tough-talkin' Apple cousin from Manehattan", debuting in "One Bad Apple". She was created as a "blank flank" bully of the Cutie Mark Crusaders "whose behavior was the result of an insecurity that the Crusaders could relate to and ultimately help her overcome". She joins the Crusaders and forms her branch of the club in Manehattan because, according to McCarthy, "We've got our three Crusaders in Ponyville and didn't want to add a permanent fourth". Babs earns her cutie mark as a hairstylist in "Bloom & Gloom". Sunflower is established as the older sister of Babs Seed; Human versions of both Babs and Sunflower appear as students at Canterlot High School in the IDW comics.
- Gabby (voiced by Erin Mathews) – A friendly and enthusiastic female griffon and a social outcast from Griffonstone who joins the Crusaders at the end of her debut in "The Fault in Our Cutie Marks", following her failed attempts to obtain her cutie mark. She returns in "Dragon Dropped" when she is shown to have become pen-pals with Spike.

=== Legion of Doom ===
==== Queen Chrysalis ====
Queen Chrysalis (voiced by Kathleen Barr) is the former leader of the changelings, a race of insectoid shape-shifters that feed off of ponies' love for each other. She first appears in season two's two-part finale, "A Canterlot Wedding", when she invades Canterlot by impersonating Princess Cadance to control her fiancé Shining Armor, only for her and her changeling army to be driven off by the couple's combined magic. She returns in season six's two-part finale, "To Where and Back Again", when she captures all of Equestria's protectors in another attempt to take over the kingdom but is defeated by Starlight and Thorax and dethroned as Queen of the changelings. After her defeat, Chrysalis swears revenge on Starlight and flees. In "The Mean 6", she creates evil clones of Twilight and her friends to seize control of the Elements of Harmony and exact her revenge on Starlight, but her plan fails when the clones betray her and are destroyed by the Tree of Harmony. In season nine's two-part premiere, "The Beginning of the End", Chrysalis is summoned by Grogar to join him in his plot to take over Equestria. After recovering Grogar's Bewitching Bell, Chrysalis, Tirek, and Cozy Glow decide to work together to betray Grogar and take Equestria for themselves. In the season's two-part finale, "The Ending of the End", they use the magic of the Bewitching Bell to make themselves all-powerful and take over Equestria, but are eventually defeated by Twilight and her friends, as well as turned into stone as punishment for their crimes.

==== Lord Tirek ====
Lord Tirek (voiced by Mark Acheson) is a powerful bull-like centaur who can absorb magic from other creatures, especially ponies. He is based on the character Tirac from the 1984 My Little Pony special, Rescue at Midnight Castle. A thousand years ago, Tirek and his brother Scorpan came to Equestria from a distant land to steal its magic. However, Scorpan grew to appreciate Equestria's ways and even befriended Star Swirl the Bearded. After Tirek refused to abandon their plan, Scorpan alerted Princess Celestia and Princess Luna of his intentions, and returned to his homeland while Tirek was imprisoned in Tartarus for his crimes. He first appears in season four's two-part finale, "Twilight's Kingdom", when he escapes from Tartarus and manipulates Discord to help him steal the magic from every pony in Equestria. Twilight and her friends eventually defeat and reimprison him with "Rainbow Power", powerful magic acquired from the Tree of Harmony. He returns in season eight's two-part finale, "School Raze" when he helps Cozy Glow with her plan to drain all of the magic from Equestria to get revenge on Twilight and her friends by trapping themselves in Tartarus. The plan fails and Cozy is locked up in Tartarus with him. In season nine's two-part premiere, "The Beginning of the End", Tirek and Cozy are later freed by Grogar to join him in his plot to take over Equestria. After recovering Grogar's Bewitching Bell, Tirek, Chrysalis, and Cozy decide to work together to betray Grogar and take Equestria for themselves. In the season's two-part finale, "The Ending of the End", they use the magic of the Bewitching Bell to make themselves all-powerful and take over Equestria, but are eventually defeated by Twilight and her friends, as well as turned into stone as punishment for their crimes.

==== Cozy Glow ====
Cozy Glow (voiced by Sunni Westbrook) is a pegasus filly and a former student of the School of Friendship. She first appears in season eight as a supporting character, until she reveals her true nature in the season's two-part finale, "School Raze" when she steals all of the magic from Equestria in a plot to rule it as the Empress of Friendship. She is foiled by the Young Six with the help of the Tree of Harmony and later imprisoned in Tartarus with Lord Tirek, her partner in crime. In season nine's two-part premiere, "The Beginning of the End", Cozy and Tirek are later freed by Grogar to join him in his plot to take over Equestria. After recovering Grogar's Bewitching Bell, Cozy, Chrysalis and Tirek decide to work together to betray Grogar and take Equestria for themselves. In the season's two-part finale, "The Ending of the End", they use the magic of the Bewitching Bell to make themselves all-powerful and take over Equestria, as well as turning the three pony races against each other, but are eventually defeated by Twilight and her friends, as well as turned to stone as punishment for their crimes.

==== Grogar ====
Grogar the Father of Monsters (voiced by Doc Harris) – An evil ibex sorcerer based on the character of the same name from the My Little Pony 'n Friends four-part episode "The Return of Tambelon". He was first mentioned in "A Flurry of Emotions" before making his first physical appearance in season nine's two-part premiere, "The Beginning of the End", where he allies villains, consisting of Queen Chrysalis, Lord Tirek, and Cozy Glow, to defeat Twilight and her friends and take over Equestria. In the season's two-part finale, "The Ending of the End", Chrysalis, Tirek, and Cozy betray Grogar and steal his magic, revealing him to have been Discord in disguise all along, attempting to create the biggest challenge for Twilight and her friends to prevail and boost their confidence for when Twilight becomes the new ruler of Equestria. The real Grogar, known as the "Father of Monsters", once ruled Equestria as its first emperor before being defeated and banished by Gusty the Great.

=== The Wonderbolts ===
The Wonderbolts are a squad of pegasi that perform "aerial feats of wonder", based on the Blue Angels. They are captained by Spitfire (voiced by Nicole Oliver in the episode "Sonic Rainboom" and Kelly Metzger in all other appearances), a "spirited competitor" and "no-nonsense instructor" at the Wonderbolts' training academy and her second-in-command Soarin' (voiced by Matt Hill).

=== The Young Six ===
The "Young Six" are six adolescent creatures who attend as students at the School of Friendship run by Twilight and her friends. They consist of:

- Smolder (voiced by Shannon Chan-Kent) – A cocky and competitive dragon. She was initially resistant to the idea of friendship, until she gets to know her new friends, and got to secretly like cute things, like dresses, makeup, and tea parties. In "Sweet and Smoky", she is revealed to be Garble's younger sister.
- Ocellus (voiced by Devyn Dalton) – A shy and studious changeling who can change her appearance into that of other creatures, much like the other changelings.
- Silverstream (voiced by Lauren Jackson) – Queen Novo's hyperactive niece who can alternate between the forms of a hippogriff and a seapony. She is similar to her cousin, Princess Skystar, in terms of personality and has shown interest in the littlest things like stairs and indoor plumbing.
- Yona (voiced by Katrina Salisbury) – A friendly and clumsy yak. Yona is shown to be excitable, but she has her vulnerabilities, including always referring to herself in the third person. Being a yak, Yona is one of the strongest members of the Young Six, often using her strength to help out. In the show's final episode, an older Yona is seen running Carousel Boutique alongside Sandbar.
- Gallus (voiced by Gavin Langelo) – A sarcastic griffon. Initially unfriendly toward others, Gallus becomes friendlier and warmer, while maintaining his sarcastic personality. He is revealed to be claustrophobic and is an orphan.
- Sandbar (voiced by Vincent Tong) – A laid-back earth pony. He usually serves as a "straight man" to counterbalance his friends' more eccentric personalities.

=== Pillars of Old Equestria ===
The Pillars of Old Equestria are six legendary adventurer ponies responsible for creating the Elements of Harmony. With the Tree of Harmony, they strived to ensure future generations could defend Equestria in its darkest hours. In the seventh season's two-part finale, "Shadow Play", the Pillars are brought into the present era after Twilight and her friends release them from millennial imprisonment in limbo alongside the Pony of Shadows, forming a tense alliance with them to defeat and ultimately rekindle the Pillars' friendship with the villain. As with Twilight and her friends, each Pillar represents one of six traits similar to the Elements of Harmony: strength (Rockhoof), healing (Mage Meadowbrook), hope (Somnambula), beauty (Mistmane), bravery (Flash Magnus), and sorcery (Star Swirl the Bearded).

==== Star Swirl the Bearded ====
Star Swirl the Bearded (voiced by Christopher Britton) – The unicorn leader of the Pillars. Originally envisioned as an archetypal wizard character with a prominent beard, similar to Merlin, he was considered by Celestia to be the "wisest and most powerful pony; a wonder that rivaled" a winged unicorn. Starswirl's main flaw was his cynical black-and-white worldview, not understanding the value of friendship and the possibility of redemption; he famously stated, "once a villain, always a villain"; and is inability to grasp "friendship magic". As detailed within the series and various tie-in media, Star Swirl is a brilliant polymath: with a lifetime spanning over one thousand years, he had extensive knowledge of all: creatures, legends, artifacts, and every known spell. Star Swirl's greatest contribution was in his service to Celestia and Luna as their mentor, father figure, and royal advisor. Celestia herself partnered with Starswirl in her early magical explorations, sharing his adventurous spirit and vast magical knowledge, though she represented stability while he was more reckless. He was responsible for banishing the Dazzlings to an alternate dimension (the human world) and helped imprison the Pony of Shadows, even sacrificing himself and the other Pillars to do so. He also befriended Scorpan, convincing him to turn against his brother Lord Tirek.

Twilight Sparkle is the first unicorn to surpass Starswirl's achievements, being his most direct magical successor, she inherited her idol's genius, spell-creation abilities (over 200 spells!), and faced similar challenges, becoming a powerful sorceress and scholar in her own right. Star Swirl's spellbook is a key figure in "Magical Mystery Cure", where Twilight is directed by Princess Celestia to finish Star Swirl's "unfinished masterpiece" written within, resulting in her ascension as a princess.

==== Rockhoof ====
Rockhoof (voiced by Matt Cowlrick) – A male earth pony whose clothing is inspired by Scandinavian culture; his first appearance was in "Campfire Tales". When every guard abandoned their kind and fled in panic to escape an erupting volcano; Rockhoof did not move. Shovel artifact in hoof, he stayed and fought to protect, lent his strength to make a barrage against the lava. Fast and powerful, many lives were saved—thus Rockhoof succeeded in becoming the unwavering hero he is known for.

==== Mistmane ====
Mistmane (voiced by Ellen-Ray Hennessy) – A female unicorn whose clothing is inspired by Japanese culture. She makes her first appearance in My Little Pony: Legends of Magic Issue #3 and her first in-show appearance was in "Campfire Tales". Mistmane was kind and generous as an angel: she was gracious, magnificent, and loved by all. An ugly empress, overcome with jealousy, stole the lifeforce from the land to achieve eternal youth and allowed nature to perish. When Mistmane saw the pitiful decaying state of the land, she fought and defeated the empress, sacrificing her beauty to restore nature to its proper balance through her flower artifact.

==== Flash Magnus ====
Flash Magnus (voiced by Giles Panton) – A male pegasus who wears Roman legionnaire-inspired armor; he makes his first appearance in My Little Pony: Legends of Magic Issue #4 and his first in-show appearance was in "Campfire Tales". Thanks to his fortuitous spirit, Magnus saved members of his platoon from a flock of dragons; knowing reinforcements would never arrive in time, Magnus, using his shield artifact, bravely led them into a trap of thunderclouds, thus defeating them.

==== Somnambula ====
Somnambula (voiced by Murry Peeters) – A female pegasus who wears Egyptian-inspired clothing. She is first mentioned in season six's "The Crystalling"; she makes her first appearance in the IDW comics' My Little Pony: Legends of Magic Issue #5 and her first in-show appearance was in "Daring Done?". Courageous and proud, Somnambula was the only one who dared encounter the sphinx, which kidnapped her prince. For his release, the sphinx gave her a riddle to solve: she found the answer, which enraged the beast. Fearing for her prince's life, Somnambula asked for another challenge: limbs bound, blinded by her blindfold artifact, she had to cross a dangerous bridge. However, she smiled, for she remembered the riddle and its answer and successfully rescued her prince.

==== Mage Meadowbrook ====
Mage Meadowbrook (voiced by Mariee Devereux) – A female earth pony who wears West African-inspired clothing. She is first mentioned in season five's "The Cutie Map"; she makes her first appearance in My Little Pony: Friendship is Magic Issue #58 and her first in-show appearance was in "A Health of Information". Regarded as the greatest doctor to have lived, Meadowbrook used her knowledge and skills for the greater good: she cured innumerable diseases and created many antidotes, vaccines, and potions. Meadowbrook is best remembered for having discovered a way to heal a deadly pandemic; legends stated that her shamanic plague mask artifact was the reason for her miracles.

==== Stygian ====
Stygian (voiced by Bill Newton) – First mentioned in "Castle Mane-ia" as the subject of a ghost story, the Pony of Shadows first appears in season seven's two-part finale, "Shadow Play". He is the alter ego of Stygian, a brilliant but resentful unicorn who united and founded The Pillars as a forced for good, and served as their patron, researcher and tactician. Stygian is mistaken for a traitor and shunned by the Pillars of Old Equestria, and bonded with an evil entity that takes the form of a shadowy monster shaped like a winged unicorn. Twilight and her friends inadvertently free him alongside the Pillars, thwarting the Pillars' millennium-long effort to contain him in limbo. The Pillars eventually recognize Stygian's innocence and work with Twilight and her friends to separate him from the shadow creature, which is returned to limbo in the Pillars' place.

=== Background Six ===
The show features an extensive cast of over 200 minor characters, also designated as "background ponies"; the vast majority lacking speaking roles, flesh-out character backgrounds or even a proper "placeholder" name in end title credits. They are primarily used as "extras" to fill out crowd scenes and serve as easter eggs or visual gags in episodes. Dozens of background ponies have been well-received by the show's brony fanbase, who have appropriated by the brony fandom's participatory culture; being assigned "official" names, developed voices, personalities and backstories to them. As a response to fan interest, the series' creative team has retroactively incorporated and canonized a majority of these fan-made expansion. Of these, six of the most popular characters were given expanded roles in later episodes and media, including being featured as the "main characters" in the show's one-hundredth episode "Slice of Life", which presents the characters' daily lives as the episode's central focus; whilst the mane six are relegated to "background ponies" status in the end title credits.

==== Derpy Hooves ====
Derpy Hooves/Muffins/Ditzy Doo (voiced by Tabitha St. Germain) – A cross-eyed pegasus with frequent background appearances throughout the franchise. Originally the subject of an overlooked animator's joke in the first episode, the character was dubbed "Derpy Hooves" and characterized as a well-meaning klutz by 4chan board users. The creators have since recognized "Derpy" as the fandom's mascot and included her in easter eggs throughout the show. She was addressed by name and given lines during the initial broadcast of "The Last Roundup" as a direct call-out to the fandom. Following complaints from viewers who felt her appearance and actions negatively reflected those of mentally handicapped people, the scene was modified to remove the character's name, alter her voice and reduce the degree to which her eyes are crossed. Amidst concerns that Derpy would be removed from the series due to these responses, the character was re-introduced in the fourth season as a "surprise" for fans after having been reduced to background cameos in previous episodes. According to Miller, the character was renamed "Muffins" for "legal reasons that I don't understand" prior to "Slice of Life".

==== Vinyl Scratch ====
DJ Pon-3/Vinyl Scratch – A unicorn disc jockey rarely seen without headphones and sunglasses, first seen in "Suited for Success". The names "DJ Pon-3" and "Vinyl Scratch" were created by the fan community, with both names being alternately used in official products, such as the "Equestria Girls" music video parodying Katy Perry's song "California Gurls".

==== Time Turner ====
Dr. Hooves/Time Turner (voiced by Jayson Thiessen/Peter New) – An earth pony who was named "Doctor Whooves" by fans for his purported resemblance to David Tennant's portrayal of the Tenth Doctor in the British television series Doctor Who. He appears in later episodes as an eccentric scientist and he exhibits similarities to his namesake in episodes such as "Slice of Life". He is voiced by various actors besides New, who voices him in "Slice of Life".

==== Lyra Heartstrings and Bon Bon ====
Lyra Heartstrings and Sweetie Drops/Bon Bon (voiced by Ashleigh Ball and Andrea Libman respectively) – The unicorn Lyra and earth pony Sweetie Drops (also named Bon Bon after the My Little Pony Tales character) appear together as "best friends" in several scenes. One such scene in "Slice of Life" outs Secret Agent Sweetie Drops, a disavowed secret agent living in Ponyville under the assumed identity "Bon Bon". Sometime after the bugbear was defeated by Twilight and her friends, Agent Furlong approached Sweetie Drops and informs her that S.M.I.L.E. remained in operation and needed her help once again. He decided to recruit her best friend Lyra Heartstrings after learning that she was aware of Sweetie Drops' true identity. The two agents were dispatched to Appleloosa, Applewood, and the Crystal Empire in search of changeling infiltrators, with Lyra and Sweetie discovering a changeling named Delilah in Appleloosa. Despite some infighting between the veteran and her rookie partner, they were able to expose the villains and summon the Mane Six to help defeat them. Afterward, the pair was established as a permanent team, remaining in Ponyville. Lyra and Bon Bon are the main focus of the chapter book Lyra and Bon Bon and the Mares from S.M.I.L.E., in which Bon Bon rejoins the S.M.I.L.E. (Note: Secret Monster Intelligence League of Equestria) spy agency alongside Lyra. In Beyond Equestria: Pinkie Pie Steps Up, the pair are tasked by their agency to retrieve the Pondora Box and are aided by Songbird Serenade and Pinkie Pie. They are voiced by various actresses, with Ball voicing Lyra and Libman as Sweetie Drops in "Slice of Life". Having been popularly paired by fans as a lesbian couple, they were officially canonized as such in season nine, proposing to each other in the background of one scene in "The Big Mac Question" and shown to be married in "The Last Problem".

==== Octavia Melody ====
Octavia Melody (voiced by Kazumi Evans) – An earth pony who plays the cello, originally seen in "The Best Night Ever". She is featured in a scene in "Slice of Life", where she rehearses an "electric cello dubstep" number with fellow musician DJ Pon-3 for Cranky and Matilda's wedding; Octavia's portion of the song was performed by Tina Guo.

=== Canterlot Six ===
==== Minuette, Twinkleshine and Lemon Hearts ====
Minuette/Colgate, Twinkleshine and Lemon Hearts (voiced by Rebecca Husain, Tabitha St. Germain, and Ashleigh Ball respectively) – Three unicorns who are given focus in "Amending Fences" as Twilight's friends from before her move to Ponyville, while Minuette and Twinkleshine appear alongside Lyra Heartstrings as Princess Cadance's bridesmaids in "A Canterlot Wedding". Among various other actresses, they are voiced by Husain (Minuette), St. Germain (Twinkleshine), and Ball (Lemon Hearts) in "Amending Fences".

==== Moondancer ====
Moondancer (voiced by Kazumi Evans) is a unicorn mare, a former classmate and close friend of Twilight Sparkle. She is a studious but socially isolated pony who struggles with friendships and fears being vulnerabule. Twilight resolves their relationship in the episode "Amending Fences".

=== The Equal Four ===
The "Equal Four" are ponies from "Our Town"—Double Diamond (voiced by Brian Drummond), Party Favor (voiced by Samuel Vincent), Sugar Belle (voiced by Rebecca Shoichet), and Night Glider (voiced by Rebecca Shoichet)—they were initially manipulated by Starlight Glimmer to join a cult-like ideological community where everyone's cutie marks were removed, forcing everyone to be the same, which she believed was true equality. These ponies initially drawn to Starlight's ideology, eventually realized they missed their special talents and the joy they brought, leading them to reject forced uniformity and embrace their individuality.

=== Others ===
==== Starlight Glimmer ====
Starlight Glimmer (voiced by Kelly Sheridan) is a unicorn with a strong talent for magic and a former villain. She first appears in season five's two-part premiere, "The Cutie Map", when she was the founder and leader of a village where she wishes to build a "perfectly equal society" by magically removing other ponies' cutie marks because she believes differences cause disharmony between friends until Twilight and her friends came to her village and exposed her ruse. She returns in the season's two-part finale, "The Cutie Re-Mark", to get revenge on Twilight by time traveling back to the past and stopping Rainbow Dash from performing her first Sonic Rainboom to prevent Twilight and her friends from coming together. Twilight and Spike follow after her, but they repeatedly fail to stop her from altering the past, which creates numerous alternate versions of Equestria falling into ruin. When they brought her to a future to show her the consequences of her actions, Starlight refuses to accept the truth and shows them her childhood, revealing that she lost touch with her friend Sunburst after he earned his cutie mark and left to study magic in Canterlot, which lead her to believe that cutie marks ruin friendships. However, Twilight convinces Starlight to change her ways and make new friends and even takes her on as her student. In season six, Starlight starts learning the ways of friendship as Twilight's student, until she graduates in season seven, after defeating Queen Chrysalis and bringing harmony to the Changeling Kingdom. In season eight, she becomes the School of Friendship's guidance counselor to help the students with their problems. Later in "A Horse Shoe-In", she becomes the school's new head mare as Twilight was leaving to rule Equestria.

==== Discord ====
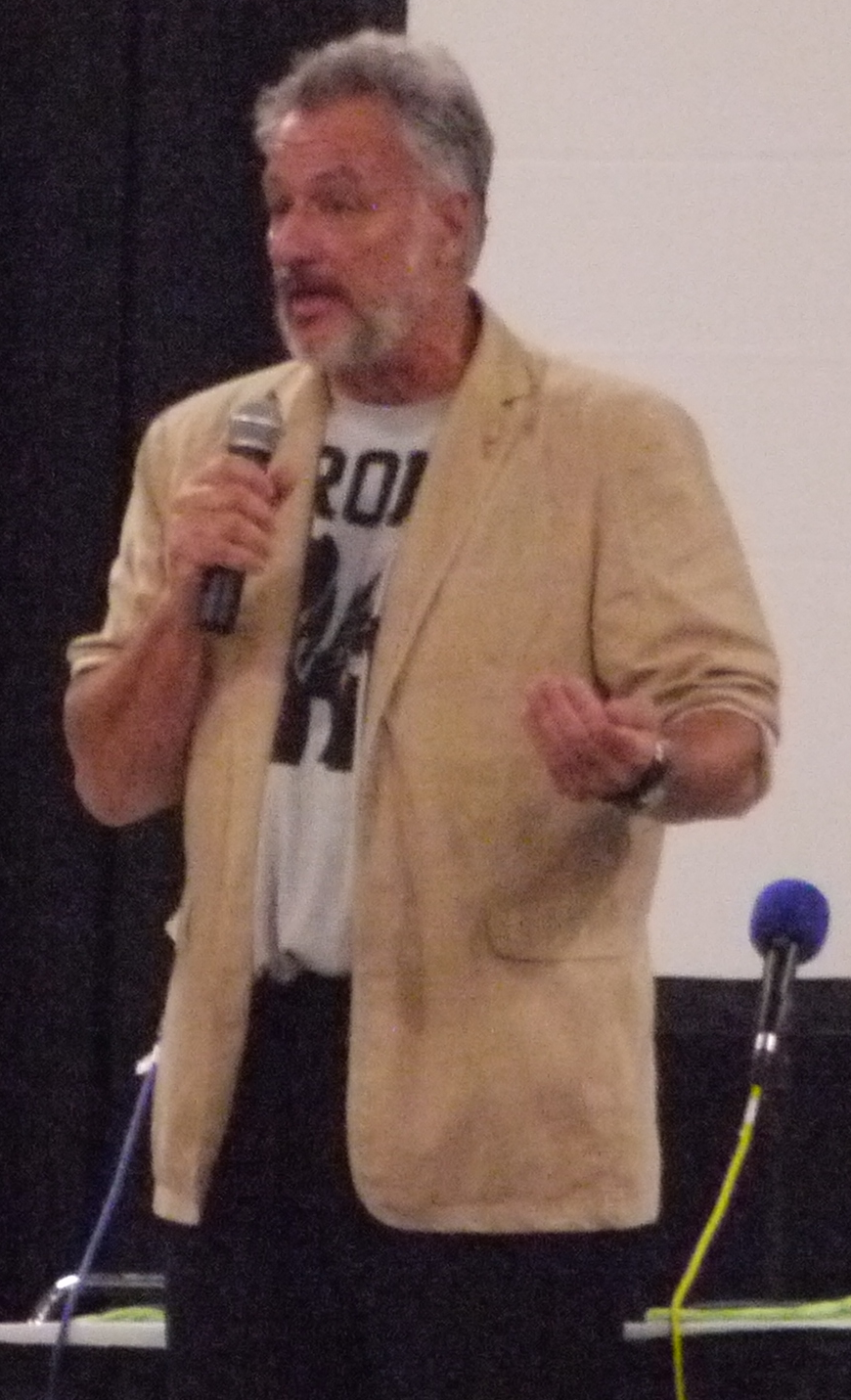
Actor John de Lancie (pictured at BronyCon, 2012) voices Discord, a character based on his television role as Q from Star Trek: The Next Generation.

Discord (voiced by John de Lancie) is a draconequus (a dragon-like creature with body parts from different animals) and the spirit of chaos and disharmony. A thousand years ago, Discord once ruled Equestria in a state of unrest and unhappiness until Princess Celestia and Princess Luna used the Elements of Harmony to turn him into stone. He first appears in season two's two-part premiere, "The Return of Harmony", when he breaks free of his stone imprisonment and sets out to spread chaos all across Equestria until Twilight and her friends used the Elements to turn him back into stone. In "Keep Calm and Flutter On", Discord is released once again from his stone imprisonment by Twilight and her friends under Celestia's orders to reform him, which succeeds after Fluttershy befriends him. Following this, he appears in subsequent episodes as a reluctant ally of Twilight and her friends, occasionally still causing mischief while struggling to become a better friend to them.

==== Trixie Lulamoon ====
Trixie (voiced by Kathleen Barr), self-styled "The Great and Powerful Trixie", is a boastful unicorn magician who exaggerates her magical abilities and refers to herself in the third person. She makes appearances in the show and various spin-offs, beginning as a rival to Twilight Sparkle in "Boast Busters", but becomes more apologetic after seeing the error of her vengefulness in "Magic Duel". She makes recurring appearances starting from "No Second Prances", when she befriends Starlight Glimmer. Later in "A Horse Shoe-In", she becomes the School of Friendship's new guidance counselor.

==== Zecora ====
Zecora (voiced by Brenda Crichlow) is a zebra shaman and herbalist who always speaks in rhyme and lives in the Everfree Forest, a "mysterious" forest on the edge of Ponyville. The townsfolk misjudge her as an "evil enchantress" until Twilight and her friends befriend her in "Bridle Gossip", often turning to her for her wisdom and special potions. Her appearance and mannerisms are influenced by African tribal cultures. She speaks in an African-esque accent; show creator Lauren Faust has stated on her DeviantArt page that Zecora's accent is meant to resemble that of Swahili speakers. The show's staff did not have time or resources to have authentic Swahili, so they asked Crichlow—Zecora's voice actor—to improvise.

==== King Sombra ====
King Sombra (voiced by Jim Miller in season three; Alvin Sanders in season nine) – The former tyrannical unicorn ruler of the Crystal Empire. A thousand years ago, Sombra took over the Crystal Empire, until Princess Celestia and Princess Luna banished him to the frozen north. Before his banishment, Sombra put a curse on the Crystal Empire that made it vanish into thin air. He first appears in season three's two-part premiere, "The Crystal Empire", when he returns along with the city, but his efforts to reclaim it are thwarted when the magical Crystal Heart that protects the city obliterates him. Sombra returns in season nine's two-part premiere, "The Beginning of the End" when he is resurrected by Grogar to join him in his plot to take over Equestria. He refuses to team up with him and the other villains in favor of conquering Equestria by himself. He destroys the Tree and the Elements of Harmony and takes over Ponyville and Canterlot, but is vanquished once again by Twilight and her friends.
Miller based his performance on the vocals of the Mastodon song "Crystal Skull".

==== Sunburst ====
Sunburst (voiced by Ian Hanlin) – A unicorn with vast knowledge about magic and Starlight's childhood friend. After Sunburst earned his cutie mark and left to study magic in Canterlot, he lost touch with Starlight. Following the events of "The Crystalling", he is appointed as Flurry Heart's "crystaller" and magic advisor and rekindles his friendship with Starlight. Later in "A Horse Shoe-In", Starlight hires him as the School of Friendship's vice-head stallion.

==== Daring Do ====
A.K. Yearling (voiced by Chiara Zanni) – A pegasus treasure hunter and the main character of the adventure novel series of the same name parodying Indiana Jones. Author Begin describes her as "essentially a different-colored Rainbow Dash in a hat". In "Daring Don't", the books' author A.K. Yearling (a parody of J.K. Rowling) is discovered to be Daring Do herself, who writes her books as biography disguised as fiction after her real adventures, such as her encounters with the Aztec mythology-inspired villain Ahuizotl (voiced by Brian Drummond) and criminal pony Dr. Caballeron (voiced by Michael Dobson).

=== Extended family members of main characters ===
==== Apple family ====
Apple family – Applejack's immediate family are Big McIntosh, Granny Smith, Apple Bloom and her pet dog Winona. The family and relatives follow a similar theme of having names that relate to apple and fall-themed foods. Her parents Bright Mac and Pear Butter are deceased. Sugar Belle, a unicorn baker who lived in the "Our Town" village founded by Starlight, is in a romantic relationship with Big McIntosh and becomes Mrs. Cake's part-time apprentice in Ponyville before marrying Big Mac in "The Big Mac Question". Later in "The Last Problem", she is depicted as the mother of a colt unofficially named "Big Sugar". (Note: Jim Miller stated "Big Sugar" as a placeholder name "until the MLP fandom could come up with a better name", as the show writers never gave him one officially.) Applejack's extended family of earth ponies that live throughout Equestria include: Granny Smith's siblings, aunts and uncles, are Apple Brown Betty and Great Uncle Needle, Apple Fritter and Apple Strudel, Great Granduncle Chili Pepper and Great Uncle Honeycrisp; Braeburn (voiced by Michael Daingerfield), Applejack's cousin from Appleloosa; her "high-society" Aunt and Uncle Orange (voiced by Tabitha St. Germain and Brian Drummond) from Manehattan; Hayseed Turnip Truck (voiced by Trevor Devall), a yokel-type odd-job worker; Sunflower, the older sister of Babs Seed (see Cutie Mark Crusaders); the "Gold Horseshoe Gals", a quartet consisting of Auntie Applesauce and Apple Rose (voiced by St. Germain and Ashleigh Ball in "Apple Family Reunion", and Marcy Goldberg and Shirley Millner in "Grannies Gone Wild"), two older cousins and friends of Granny Smith and Goldie Delicious (voiced by Peter New), an old cat lady who hoards family heirlooms; Granny's second cousin Candy Apples; and Grand Pear (voiced by William Shatner), Applejack's maternal grandfather and patriarch of the rival Pear family. The oldest confirmed Apple is Great Uncle Apple Tarts, an implied shared ancestor between the Apple and Pie families as uncovered in "Pinkie Apple Pie", but never confirmed. Other named Apple family members appear throughout the series as "background ponies" and have guest appearances in appears in "Friendship is Magic, part 1", "Family Appreciation Day" and "Apple Family Reunion" include: Gala Appleby, Apple Dumpling, Apple Leaves, Fiddly Twang, Caramel Apple, Half Baked Apple, Red Delicious, and Apple Cobbler.

==== Cake family ====
Cake family – Mr. Carrot Cake and Mrs. Cup Cake née Chiffon Swirl (voiced by Brian Drummond and Tabitha St. Germain respectively) are the earth pony owners of Sugarcube Corner and Pinkie Pie's employers/landlords/adopted family; the Cakes love Pinkie as a surrogate daughter. They perform catering services around Ponyville, specializing in confectionery baked goods and sweets. In "The Perfect Pear", Mrs. Cake reveals that she was close friends with Pear Butter. In "Baby Cakes", Mrs. Cake gives birth to their twin baby son and daughter, Pound Cake and Pumpkin Cake (voiced by St. Germain and Andrea Libman respectively), who were each born a pegasus and a unicorn. Pinkie Pie are the twins' aunt, babysitter and godmother.

==== Pie family ====
Pie family – The Pies are Pinkie Pie's immediate family who lives on a rock farm outside of Ponyville. They are depicted as a clan of dour, drably-colored Amish-like earth ponies in contrast to Pinkie's bright appearance and extroverted personality. They consist of Pinkie's father Igneous Rock Pie (voiced by Terry Klassen in "The Cutie Mark Chronicles" and Peter New in "Hearthbreakers"), mother Cloudy Quartz (voiced by Andrea Libman in "Hearthbreakers") and three sisters (all voiced by Ingrid Nilson): Limestone Pie, the surly oldest sister whose tough, sharp-tongued, headstrong, and seemingly allergic to anything resembling softness or vulnerability; Marble Pie, Pinkie's withdrawn, younger twin and Maud Pie, an older sister who rarely expresses emotion, although obsessed with rocks and has a pet rock named Boulder, is described by Apple Bloom to be "quite nice once you get to know her a little" in "Hearthbreakers". Mudbriar (voiced by Adam Kirschner), is Maud's boyfriend who first appears in the season eight episode "The Maud Couple"; he is a male Earth pony whose cutie mark and personality are literally and figuratively a "stick in the mud", respectively, and has a pet stick named Twiggy. The Cake family are Pinkie's adoptive/surrogate family.

== Other characters by region ==
Most recurring characters established within the fictional universe of the television show are expanded and more prominent in the comics, presented with complex, multi-issue story arcs. The comics provide stories based on the established fictional universe of the television show; the comic faithfully follows the show canon, but the show does not technically follow the comic canon. Though the comic, like the show, is aimed at young children, the writers and artists have consistently taken creative risks, including expanding Sombra's backstory, introducing Scootaloo's aunts as a married LGBT couple and more.

=== Equestrian characters by region ===
==== Federal government characters ====
- Chancellor Neighsay (voiced by Maurice LaMarche) – The unicorn head of the Equestria Education Association (EEA) that strictly regulates the schools and colleges within Equestria. Neighsay is strict and conservative, preferring to do things by the EEA guidelines. He is also very prejudiced against anyone who is not a pony, openly referring to non-ponies as "creatures" or "savages" in a dismissive manner. He has a fascist and speciesist world view, is critical of Twilight's reformist agenda to expand higher education outside of Equestria's borders, and has denied accreditation in light of Twilight and her friends' questionable qualifications for the teaching profession. In particular, he openly disapproves of Twilight's School of Friendship's unsegregated inclusiveness of non-pony creatures, which he considers a foolish act that threatens Equestria's national security. It is not until the events of season eight's two-part finale "School Raze" after being rescued by the Young Six that he begins to change his mind about non-pony creatures.
- Raven Inkwell – A recurring background unicorn mare whose Princess Celestia's most trusted aide, known for her diligent work as an archivist, secretary and organizer, often seen assisting with royal duties in Canterlot, and appears in the show, comics, mobile game, and merchandise. Raven is portrayed as stern, precise, and highly dedicated, taking pride in keeping things orderly to help Celestia. Her grandmother, Professor Inkwell is depicted as an elderly, long-serving unicorn teacher at the School for Gifted Unicorns, Twilight's former teacher and a personal friend of Celestia. Raven shares her character design with "Writing Desk", an Earth pony assistant to Mayor Mare.

==== Ponyville characters ====
Ponyville is the primary setting of the television series and home of the show's main characters. The town's unique locales were designed to reflect their characters, while the overall style of the town was largely influenced by Pennsylvania Dutch design, steampunk artwork, and European and Bavarian folklore. The town also incorporates pony design elements such as horseshoes, hay bales, and troughs. While the Apple family are credited as having founded Ponyville, most of the town's agriculture and marketplace features various Earth ponies farmers selling fresh vegetables.

- Mayor Mare (voiced by Cathy Weseluck) – The earth pony mayor of Ponyville.
- Cranky Doodle and Matilda (voiced by Richard Newman and Brenda Crichlow respectively) – An elderly donkey couple. When Cranky first came to Ponyville, he was a "crotchety old grouch" who rejects Pinkie Pie's friendship until she reunites him with Matilda. They soon got married in "Slice of Life".
- Filthy Rich (voiced by Brian Drummond) – A wealthy, business-savvy Earth pony, descendant of Stinkin' Rich, father of Diamond Tiara and husband to Spoiled Rich. He runs his family's business, "Rich's Barnyard Bargains," and has ties to the Zap Apple Jam business with Granny Smith. Filthy is a good-natured but sometimes misguided father figure, though his character is portrayed as more villainous in the Equestria Girls spin-off Legend of Everfree.
- Bulk Biceps (voiced by Jayson Thiessen/Michael Dobson) – A muscular pegasus stallion with small wings. His design was partially based on John Kricfalusi's animation style. He first appears as a nameless gag character in "Hurricane Fluttershy", where his shouts of "Yeah!" are recorded by Thiessen. Dobson performs the character in full speaking appearances starting with "Rainbow Falls".
- Nurse Redheart and Tenderheart (voiced by Ashleigh Ball) – Two earth pony mares who work as nurses at Ponyville Hospital.
- Daisy, Roseluck and Lily Valley (voiced by Ashleigh Ball, Kazumi Evans, and Cathy Weseluck respectively) – Three earth pony mares working as flower gardeners and florists in Ponyville who are notorious for their melodramatic panic attacks.
- Lotus Blossom and Aloe (voiced by Tabitha St. Germain) – Twin earth pony mares known for their Eastern European accents, who own and operate the Ponyville La Te Da Spa beauty salon, a favorite hangout for the mane six. They have inverted color schemes: Aloe is pink coat with a blue mane/tail and white lotus cutie mark, while her sister Lotus is blue coat with a pink mane/tail and pink lotus cutie mark.
- Lucky Clover – A male background Earth pony with a light gray coat, dark gray mane, and light blue eyes. His cutie mark, three four-leaf clovers, resembles that of a female G1 pony named Clover. He first appears in "Winter Wrap Up", and has speaking roles in "The Best Night Ever" and "A Canterlot Wedding - Part 1".
- Golden Harvest – A female Earth pony whose carrot farm is often depicted as neighboring the Apple family's orchid. with She has a pale goldenrod coat, carrot orange mane and tail, dark olive green eyes, and a cutie mark of three carrots with greens. Her name is not mentioned on the show, but it appears varyingly in merchandise and other media. She has speaking roles in "Boast Busters", "Swarm of the Century", "Green Isn't Your Color", "A Friend in Deed", and "It Isn't the Mane Thing About You".
- Strawberry Sunrise (voiced by Maggie Blue O'Hara) – A female Pegasus pony with a pale goldenrod coat, pale, light amaranth mane, dark olive green eyes, and cutie mark of a strawberry. She appears as a Pegasus in "Hurricane Fluttershy" and "Equestria Games". In the season seven episode "Honest Apple", Strawberry Sunrise has a speaking role in which she expresses an extreme distaste for apples (to Applejack's outrage).
- Cherry Berry and Berryshine – Female earth ponies with cutie marks of cherries a bunch of grapes and a strawberry, respectively. Cherry is depicted as a hot-air balloonist, wearing pilot's hats and taking passengers on flights in "Grannies Gone Wild" and "Spike at Your Service". Lauren Faust privately named Berry "Pinot Noir" after her favorite wine,, and the character is humorously depicted as intoxicated by the fandom. Berryshine shares her design with Cherry Berry and are treated as sisters by the fandom. They have speaking roles in "Luna Eclipsed", "The Mysterious Mare Do Well", "The Super Speedy Cider Squeezy 6000", "Putting Your Hoof Down", "It Isn't the Mane Thing About You", in "The Ending of the End - Part 2".
- Amethyst Star (voiced by Brenda Crichlow) – A female unicorn known for her pink coat, violet mane with a lavender streak, amethyst eyes, and diamond cutie mark, often portrayed as an organizer and friend to many notable background characters.
- Shoeshine – A female Earth pony with light blue coat, periwinkle mane, fandango-colored eyes, and two interlocking horseshoe cutie mark, depicted as a friendly, observant pony in various situations. She is a fan-favorite background character who achieved over 100 appearances; more than any other background character.
- Flax Seed and Wheat Grass – An Earth pony couple whose personality traits and clothing styles reminiscent of the hippie subculture of the 1960s.
- Flitter and Cloud Chaser – Two recurring Pegasus sisters known for their close friendship, distinct color schemes (Flitter is blue/purple; Cloud Chaser is light blue/dark blue), and appearances in various episodes, showcasing their love for flying and completive races, helping with weather control, often appearing as a duo participating in events alongside Rainbow Dash.
- Cheerilee (voiced by Nicole Oliver) – The earth pony teacher at the Ponyville Schoolhouse; she is based on G3 Cheerilee. The Schoolhouse is featured in the wide shot in the title sequence, and its interior is first featured in "Call of the Cutie", where Cheerilee teaches her class about cutie marks. Cheerilee adores all of her students. Cutie Mark Crusaders aside, her more notable named background pony students are Dinky Do, Featherweight (voiced by Richard Ian Cox), Button Mash, Twist (voiced by Alexandra Carter), Archer, Truffle, and Piña Colada; her other frequently recurring students are:
  - Snips and Snails (voiced by Lee Tockar and Richard Ian Cox respectively) – Two dimwitted unicorn colts who create mischief in Ponyville. The short and pudgy Snips is "known for his enthusiasm" while the taller Snails is "slightly more relaxed".
  - Diamond Tiara and Silver Spoon (voiced by Chantal Strand and Shannon Chan-Kent respectively) – Two wealthy, snobbish earth pony fillies who tease the Cutie Mark Crusaders for not having their cutie marks, calling them "blank flanks". They appear consistently throughout the shows' first five seasons, primarily as antagonists to the Cutie Mark Crusaders, before their eventual redemption. Diamond Tiara and Silver Spoon first appeared in "Call of the Cutie" of season one. Between seasons two to five, they were featured characters in the episodes: "The Super Speedy Cider Squeezy 5000", "Ponyville Confidential", "Wonderbolts Academy", "For Whom the Sweetie Belle Toils" and "The Cutie Map". It is shown in season five "Crusaders of the Lost Mark" that Silver Spoon considered ending her friendship with Diamond Tiara; Diamond Tiara's behavior stems from her stress about meeting the expectations of her mother, Spoiled Rich (voiced by Strand). By the end of the episode, she and Silver Spoon make peace with the Crusaders. From season six onwards, they were effectively written out of the series, but they continued to appear as background ponies in some episodes, often in supporting roles that demonstrate their changed behavior and character growth.
  - Pipsqueak (voiced by William Lawrenson in "Luna Eclipsed" and Graham Verchere in all other appearances) – A pinto earth pony colt who hails from Trottingham, a location outside of Ponyville. He speaks with a Cockney accent in most of his appearances.
  - Toola Roola and Coconut Cream (voiced by Alyssya Swales and Áine Sunderland respectively) – First appeared in "Fame and Misfortune", fighting over a misunderstanding, but Twilight helped them reconcile, highlighting themes of friendship and conflict resolution. Originated from older generations (G3/G3.5) as Earth ponies; now reimagined as young fillies living in Ponyville, friends in the School of Friendship; their cutie marks are associated with cupcakes and parties.

==== Canterlot characters ====
Canterlot is the mountainside capital of Equestria, named after the castle Camelot of Arthurian legend. The city is home to the country's upper-class elite, including Princess Celestia and Princess Luna, who reside in the local castle. Canterlot was designed to give the sense of its residents' royalty and nobility.

- Prince Blueblood (voiced by Vincent Tong) – A unicorn who is Princess Celestia's distant nephew and an object of Rarity's affection until he proves to be "quite vain" and "a pompous fool".
- Hoity Toity (voiced by Trevor Devall) – An earth pony "fashion guru" who gives make-or-break critiques to designers.
- Photo Finish (voiced by Tabitha St. Germain) – A famed earth pony fashion photographer who speaks with an Austrian accent.
- Sapphire Shores (voiced by Rena Anakwe) – An earth pony singer who is known as the "Pony of Pop", based on the "G3" toy of the same name.
- Fancy Pants (voiced by Trevor Devall) – A good-natured unicorn socialite with the highest position in elite Canterlot society, often appearing with a readily agreeable entourage.
- Fleur De Lis (voiced by Nicole Oliver) – A white and pink unicorn from My Little Pony: Friendship is Magic and Equestria Girls. She's a fashion designer, supermodel, and socialite with a boutique called Beware the FLAIR. In public, Fleur is frequently seen with Fancy Pants on dates; in the IDW comics, she is a retired guardsman who secretly his bodyguard. Fleur has a light gray complexion, magenta-gray hair, and violet eyes. Her speaks with a french accent and her cutie mark is three fleurs-de-lis, a symbol of nobility in her homeland of Prance.
- Sassy Saddles (voiced by Kelly Sheridan) – A unicorn who is the manager of "Canterlot Carousel", Rarity's boutique in Canterlot that opens in "Canterlot Boutique". Her design was inspired by Emily Blunt's character Emily Charlton in The Devil Wears Prada.
- Songbird Serenade (voiced by Sia) – A pegasus pop star and celebrity who appears as the headlining act for Canterlot's Friendship Festival in My Little Pony: The Movie.

==== Cloudsdale characters ====
Cloudsdale is the home and birthplace of several pegasus characters such as Rainbow Dash and Fluttershy. It is depicted as a floating city of clouds where pegasi produce Equestria's clouds, weather, and rainbows inside a specialized "weather factory". The city's design was influenced by Greek and Roman architecture, which author Begin states "harks back to the original Olympic Games, [...] a fitting reference for Rainbow Dash".

- Boy Bullies – A trio of pegasus stallions introduced in "Sonic Rainboom" serve as Rainbow Dash's childhood bullies. They consist of Hoops (voiced by Kathleen Barr in "Sonic Rainboom" and Terry Klassen in all other appearances) and two nameless ponies nicknamed "Billy/Dumb-Bell" (voiced by Richard Ian Cox in "Sonic Rainboom" and Brian Drummond in "The Cutie Mark Chronicles") and the unvoiced "Score".
- Weather Control Pegasi – Sunshower (voiced by Cathy Weseluck), Open Skies (voiced by Ashleigh Ball), Clear Skies (voiced by Tabitha St. Germain), and Fluffy Clouds (voiced by Trevor Devall) are four Pegasus ponies who first appear in "Tanks for the Memories"; Fluffy Clouds later appears in "Princess Spike" and "Celestial Advice". Fluffy Clouds is called Fluffy Cloudsdale in some merchandise.

==== Las Pegasus characters ====
- Flim and Flam (voiced by Samuel Vincent and Scott McNeil respectively) – Twin unicorn brothers and traveling "sales ponies" who are proficient at "liberating the burdens of wealth" from their patrons and exploiting legal loopholes to avoid getting caught. They often use song and dance to manipulate ponies into either purchasing their usually faulty products or patronizing questionable "get-rich-quick" venture schemes until they get foiled by Applejack. Later, they started running a resort in Las Pegasus.
  Writer M.A. Larson said he "particularly enjoyed" writing for Flim and Flam, saying that "their energy and optimism infuses the actual writing".

==== Manehattan characters ====
- Coco Pommel (voiced by Cathy Weseluck) – An earth pony costume and fashion designer who works in Manehattan. She is introduced in "Rarity Takes Manehattan" as the assistant to Suri Polomare (voiced by Tabitha St. Germain), Rarity's chief rival in a fashion competition, and quits after observing Suri's unscrupulous tactics for winning. Rarity's generosity was a huge inspiration for Coco, who grew up being told: "It's everypony for themselves!". Coco designs costumes for plays over in Bridleway Theater District and is currently chief manager of Rarity's Manehattan branch of fashion stores, Rarity For You. Her name is a reference to fashion designer Coco Chanel; it was later changed to "Miss Pommel" for "legal reasons".
- Countess Coloratura (Voiced by Lena Hall), a famous pop-singing Earth pony mare in the Season 5 episode "The Mane Attraction", known as a childhood friend of Applejack and a glamorous diva who learns to embrace her true self with the help of the ponies. She transitions from a high-maintenance star under her manager Svengallop to her authentic self, becoming a beloved singer who still loves charity work and her friends.

==== Crystal Empire characters ====
- Flash Sentry (voiced by Vincent Tong) – A pegasus who works as a member of the Canterlot Royal Guard and announcer. Flash's human counterpart appears as a supporting character in the Equestria Girls franchise.

==== Hope Hollow characters ====
Hope Hollow is a town in Equestria located some distance from Ponyville, most noted for an annual celebration known as the Rainbow Festival. The town and its inhabitants appear in the TV special My Little Pony: Rainbow Roadtrip.

- Sunny Skies (voiced by Ian Hanlin) – A kindhearted, enthusiastic unicorn stallion who serves as the current mayor. He cares deeply for all of his citizens and tries to nurture their talents whenever possible, always praising them even if they might not care about their work. His father and grandfather served as mayors before him.
- Petunia Petals (voiced by Kelly Metzger) – An optimistic, hardworking, and intelligent earth pony mare who never gives up hope on the ponies she cares about. Petunia holds several different jobs within the town, including librarian, innkeeper, and historian and takes pride in ensuring that the town's residents are well-read.
- Torque Wrench (voiced by Rhona Rees) – An earth pony mare who provides repair services. She is highly skilled at fixing a range of items, both ordinary and magical, but does not take pride in her work until Applejack encourages her to do so.
- Kerfuffle (voiced by Racquel Belmonte) – A pegasus mare and fashion designer who operates a boutique in Hope Hollow. She has used Rarity's outfits as a starting point for her designs but hesitates to put them on display until Rarity encourages her to exhibit her talents. Kerfuffle wears a wooden prosthesis to replace the lower half of one hind leg.
- Mr. and Mrs. Hoofington (voiced by Michael Daingerfield and Veena Sood respectively) – A middle-aged unicorn couple who moved to Hope Hollow from Manehattan. They provided baked goods for the Rainbow Festival in past years, but the quality of their pies has suffered due to the color loss, making it difficult for them to tell ripe fruit from unripe.
- Moody Root (voiced by Terry Klassen) – An elderly, grouchy earth pony stallion and the neighbor of the Hoofingtons. He grows lush apricot trees but keeps all the fruit to himself until Fluttershy and Pinkie Pie persuade him to share the crop with the Hoofingtons in exchange for some of their pies.
- Barley and Pickle Barrel (voiced by Sabrina Pitre and David A. Kaye respectively) – Fraternal twin pegasus foals who greatly admire Rainbow Dash and try to copy her moves. Their inexperience with stunt flying foils their attempts until Rainbow gives them lessons, showing them the basics and then moving on to more advanced techniques.

==== Equestrian characters of unspecified origin ====
- Steven Magnet (voiced by Lee Tockar) – A male sea serpent living in a river in the Everfree Forest who debuts in "Friendship Is Magic". He is flamboyant and very fashion-conscious about his mane and moustache, but has a highly amiable personality. In "Slice of Life", he reveals himself as an old friend of Cranky Doodle and serves as his "best beast" at his wedding with Matilda.

=== Non-Equestrian characters by region ===
==== Changeling characters ====
- Thorax (voiced by Kyle Rideout) – The new leader of the changelings. He first appears in "The Times They Are a Changeling" when he befriends Spike after explaining that he is different than other changelings and does not want to cause harm. In "To Where and Back Again", he helps defeat Chrysalis after appealing to his fellow changelings and becomes their new leader. He has an older brother named Pharynx (voiced by Bill Newton) who acts as chief of security for the hive.

==== Griffonstone characters ====
- Gilda (voiced by Maryke Hendrikse) – A female griffon who first appears in "Griffon the Brush Off". She is introduced as a childhood friend of Rainbow Dash, who later ends their friendship when Gilda tries to assert herself over Rainbow Dash's pony friends by bullying them. The two later reconcile in "The Lost Treasure of Griffonstone".
- Grampa Gruff (voiced by Richard Ian Cox) – A grumpy old griffon who first appears in "The Lost Treasure of Griffonstone".

==== Yakyakistan characters ====
- Prince Rutherford (voiced by Garry Chalk) – A temperamental male yak and the prince of Yakyakistan. He first appears in "Party Pooped" as part of a Yakyakistani delegation to Equestria.

==== Dragon Lands characters ====
Dragons are a species of apex predators generally depicted as nomadic, selfish, and reclusive creatures; their level of greed determines their: physical size, power, lifespan, and territory. Many dragons accumulate wealth through the use of force, threats, or coercion to intimidate or aggressively dominate other "lesser species". Due to their egotistical nature, dragons do not have any formal "borders or government" by traditional definitions, functioning rather like adhocracy. Under dragon laws and customs, the term "Dragon Lands" is whenever or wherever a dragon chooses to roost its young or hoard its treasures determines its sovereign territories for centuries. Being kraterocratic however, all dragons acknowledge (and adhere out of fear) to arbitration by the Dragon Lord—the sole monarch of the "Dragon Lands", who is traditionally the oldest, strongest and greediest despot. Begin describes the dragon designs used in the show as "traditional" while finding that their "exaggerated noses and large heads resting on exceptionally skinny necks" is evocative of the show's humor.

- Dragon Lord Ember (voiced by Ali Milner) – The daughter of Torch and the youngest dragon to obtain the title of Dragon Lord. Ember is diplomatic and compassionate, with genuine concern for the welfare of her people. After meeting and befriending Spike, Ember desires to learn more about the ways of friendship and agrees to share letters with Twilight regarding the ways of dragons.
- Torch (voiced by Matt Cowlrick) – A gargantuan elder dragon and former Dragon Lord, who is succeeded by his daughter, Ember, in "Gauntlet of Fire". Currently the oldest and largest dragon in existence, Torch used his wealth, size, and experience to extort and intimidate his way up the dragonkind hierarchy to become Dragon Lord.
- Garble (voiced by Vincent Tong) – A teenage dragon who leads a gang of dragon bullies and an adversary of Spike. He is also Smolder's older brother, as revealed in "Sweet and Smoky".

==== Klugetown characters ====
- Capper (voiced by Taye Diggs) – An anthropomorphic cat and con-artist who appears in My Little Pony: The Movie. He meets Twilight and her friends when they arrive at the desert town of Klugetown and pretends to help them with the ulterior motive of selling them off to settle a debt. However, after Rarity demonstrates generosity towards him, he has a change of heart and helps Twilight's friends rescue her when she is captured and free Canterlot from the Storm King's control, after which he joins the ponies in their celebration at the Friendship Festival after the Storm King is defeated.
- Verko (voiced by Brian Dobson) – An anthropomorphic mole crime boss whom Capper had planned to sell Twilight and her friends to.

==== Ornithia characters ====
- Captain Celaeno (voiced by Zoe Saldaña) – An anthropomorphic parrot and pirate captain with a prosthetic limb who appears in My Little Pony: The Movie. She meets Twilight and her friends after they stow away on her ship while escaping from Tempest Shadow. Celaeno and her crew initially intend to throw the ponies overboard, as they have been forced into the Storm King's service, but Rainbow Dash inspires her to defy orders and take her and her friends to Mount Aris. Later in the film, Celaeno and her crew join Twilight's friends to rescue her after her capture and defeat of the Storm King and she joins the ponies in their celebration after the Storm King's defeat.

==== Hippogriffia and Seaquestria characters ====
- Princess Skystar (voiced by Kristin Chenoweth) – The cheerful Princess of Seaquestria and Queen Novo's daughter who appears in My Little Pony: The Movie. She first meets Twilight and her friends when they arrive at Mount Aris and leads them to Seaquestria, where she tries to convince Novo to help Twilight and her friends save their home from the Storm King. When Novo refuses and banishes the ponies from their kingdom, Skystar disobeys her mother and joins Twilight's friends to save her after her capture by Tempest Shadow and to defeat the Storm King, after which she joins the ponies' celebration in Canterlot and is grounded by Novo for leaving their home.
- Queen Novo (voiced by Uzo Aduba) – The ruler of Seaquestria and Hippogriffia who appears in My Little Pony: The Movie. She is first seen when her daughter Skystar leads Twilight and her friends to her throne room and refuses to use her magic pearl to aid them against the Storm King. She is later convinced by Skystar to help the ponies but banishes them from her kingdom when Twilight tries to steal the pearl. At the movie's end, she joins the ponies' festival in Canterlot after the Storm King has been defeated and grounds Skystar for her disobedience.
- General Seaspray (voiced by Christopher Gaze) – The leader of Queen Novo's navy.
- Terramar (voiced by Cole Howard) – Silverstream's younger brother.
- Sky Beak (voiced by Brian Dobson) – Silverstream and Terramar's father, a hippogriff.
- Ocean Flow (voiced by Advah Soudack) – Silverstream and Terramar's mother and Queen Novo's sister, a seapony.

==== Storm Empire characters ====
- Tempest Shadow (voiced by Emily Blunt) – The Storm King's lieutenant in My Little Pony: The Movie. She is a cold and ruthless unicorn with a scarred right eye and a broken horn, having lost it to an Ursa minor attack, who leads the Storm King's takeover of Canterlot and captures the four princesses to empower his staff with their magic, with the promise of the Storm King using it to restore her horn. However, she is betrayed and nearly swept up by the tornado he creates, only to be saved by Twilight, inspiring Tempest to befriend her and help her and her friends defeat the Storm King and even introducing her real name, Fizzlepop Berrytwist.
- The Storm King (voiced by Liev Schreiber) – A satyr-like conqueror of lands who invades Equestria in My Little Pony: The Movie. He tasks Tempest Shadow with capturing Princess Celestia, Luna, Cadance, and Twilight to use their magic to empower his Staff of Sacanas in exchange for him restoring her broken horn. After absorbing the four princesses' magic, the Storm King conjures a massive tornado to destroy Canterlot and betrays Tempest as well. He is defeated by the combined efforts of Twilight, her friends, and Tempest, and his body is turned into stone and shattered to pieces.
- Grubber (voiced by Michael Peña) – A bumbling, gluttonous hedgehog who appears in My Little Pony: The Movie. He is a minion of the Storm King and Tempest Shadow's sidekick who accompanies her through the film in her quest to capture Twilight.

=== Historical characters by region ===
These characters lived centuries in the past at a minimum. They are often mentioned posthumously for historical context to the plot.

==== Founders of Equestria ====
- Princess Platinum – Daughter of the Unicorn King and assistant leader of the unicorns. Played by Rarity in the Hearth's Warming Eve pageant.
- Clover the Clever – Star Swirl the Bearded's protégée and assistant to Princess Platinum. Played by Twilight Sparkle in the Hearth's Warming Eve pageant.
- Chancellor Puddinghead – Leader of the earth ponies despite doing silly things. Played by Pinkie Pie in the Hearth's Warming Eve pageant.
- Smart Cookie – Secretary to Chancellor Puddinghead. Played by Applejack in the Hearth's Warming Eve pageant.
- Commander Hurricane – Leader of the pegasi. Played by Rainbow Dash in the Hearth's Warming Eve pageant.
- Private Pansy – Subordinate of Commander Hurricane. Played by Fluttershy in the Hearth's Warming Eve pageant.

==== The Tree of Harmony ====
The Tree of Harmony is an sapient entity that protected Equestria for thousands of years and created the Elements of Harmony. It preserves balance and harmony without conscious effort and seldom can be communicated with directly, although it often shows hints of having a will of its own. In "What Lies Beneath", the Tree's roots have expanded well outside the Everfree Forest and its abilities have exponentially grown to the point of being able to project a physical form of its consciousness.

In season four finale, "Twilight's Kingdom", the Tree of Harmony indirectly created Twilight Sparkle's castle, the Castle of Friendship. The Tree of Harmony's magic was channeled into a mysterious chest at its base, which then sprouted into the crystal castle after the chest was transported to Ponyville. In season seven's two-part finale, "Shadow Play", it is revealed that the Tree of Harmony was grown by the Pillars of Old Equestria to protect Equestria in their absence. In "The Mean 6", Chrysalis and the "evil clones" of the Mane Six find the Tree of Harmony, but the Elements destroy the clones when they attempt to use them. In "What Lies Beneath", the Tree is revealed to be sentient and uses a ghostly illusion of Twilight Sparkle to communicate with the Young Six. In season eight's two-part finale, "School Raze", the Tree's magic prevents Starlight, the Young Six, and the magic of Equestria from being sucked into Cozy Glow's vortex.

In season nine's two-part premiere, "The Beginning of the End", King Sombra destroys the Tree of Harmony and the Elements of Harmony shatter along with it. In "Uprooted", the Young Six are called by the Tree to the site of where it was destroyed. After arguing over how to memorialize it, they use the Tree's broken pieces to build a small treehouse, and the Tree's magic transforms it into a grand treehouse at the center of the Castle of the Two Sisters' ruins.

==== Historical characters of unspecified origin ====
- Gusty the Great is a legendary historical figure who banished Grogar, "The Father of Monsters". First depicted in Celestia's flashback in My Little Pony Micro-Series Issue #8, she is also mentioned in "A Flurry of Emotions", "The Beginning of the End" and "Frenemies".
