= My Little Pony: Friendship Is Magic season 6 =

My Little Pony: Friendship Is Magic
- Season 6
- DVD cover
- No. of episodes: 26

Release
- Original network: Discovery Family
- Original release: March 26 – October 22, 2016

Season chronology
- ← Previous; Season 5 Next → Season 7

The sixth season of the animated television series My Little Pony: Friendship Is Magic, developed by Lauren Faust, originally aired on the Discovery Family channel in the United States. The series is based on Hasbro's My Little Pony line of toys and animated works and is often referred by collectors to be the fourth generation, or "G4", of the My Little Pony franchise. Season 6 of the series premiered on March 26, 2016 on Discovery Family, an American pay television channel partly owned by Hasbro, and concluded on October 22.

The show follows a pony named Twilight Sparkle as she learns about friendship in the town of Ponyville. Twilight continues to learn with her close friends Applejack, Rarity, Fluttershy, Rainbow Dash and Pinkie Pie. Each represents a different face of friendship, and Twilight discovers herself to be a key part of the magical artifacts, the Elements of Harmony. The ponies share adventures and help out other residents of Ponyville, while working out the troublesome moments in their own friendships.

== Development ==
On March 31, 2015, Discovery Family announced via press release a sixth season for the series. On January 28, 2016, Yahoo Entertainment released an exclusive clip from the show's upcoming sixth season depicting the baby daughter of Princess Cadance and Shining Armor, Flurry Heart, who will be introduced into the season as a new character. On March 7, 2016, a Game of Thrones-style teaser trailer for the season was released, hinting several locations of that season. Ed Valentine, writer of the Season 4 episodes "Flight to the Finish" and "Three's a Crowd" with the latter being a collaboration alongside headwriter Meghan McCarthy, confirmed via Twitter that he wrote two episodes for Season 6.

== Promotion ==
At the 2015 San Diego Comic-Con, while the show was in its fifth season, it was revealed that there will be an episode involving Fluttershy having a brother. However, in regards to whether Fluttershy's brother would be appearing in season five or not, director Jim Miller simply responded via Twitter "not [season five]".

One of the songs from the season's Christmas-themed episode was first previewed at the 2016 American Toy Fair in New York City.

== Cast ==
=== Main ===
- Tara Strong as Twilight Sparkle
  - Rebecca Shoichet as Twilight Sparkle (singing voice)
- Tabitha St. Germain as Rarity
  - Kazumi Evans as Rarity (singing voice)
- Ashleigh Ball as Applejack and Rainbow Dash
- Andrea Libman as Fluttershy and Pinkie Pie
  - Shannon Chan-Kent as Pinkie Pie (singing voice); Libman occasionally
- Cathy Weseluck as Spike

=== Recurring ===
- Kelly Sheridan as Starlight Glimmer
- Nicole Oliver as Princess Celestia
- Tabitha St. Germain as Princess Luna
  - Aloma Steele as Princess Luna (singing voice)
- The Cutie Mark Crusaders
  - Michelle Creber as Apple Bloom
  - Madeleine Peters as Scootaloo
  - Claire Corlett as Sweetie Belle
- John de Lancie as Discord

=== Minor ===
==== Single roles ====
- Andrew Francis as Shining Armor
- Britt McKillip as Princess Cadance
- Ingrid Nilson as Maud Pie
- Richard Newman as Cranky Doodle
- Kelly Metzger as Spitfire
- Matt Hill as Soarin
- Cathy Weseluck as Miss Pommel
- Chantal Strand as Spoiled Rich
- Chiara Zanni as A.K. Yearling/Daring Do
- Nicole Oliver as Cheerilee
- Richard Ian Cox as Snails
- Kyle Rideout as Thorax
- Scott McNeil as Flam

==== Multiple roles ====
- Ian Hanlin as Sunburst and Twilight Changeling
- Tabitha St. Germain as Flurry Heart, Mrs. Cake, Aloe, Granny Smith, and Hoofer Steps
- Peter New as Big McIntosh and Squizard
- Michael Dobson as Bulk Biceps and Dr. Caballeron
- Kathleen Barr as Trixie Lulamoon and Queen Chrysalis
- Andrea Libman as Fleetfoot and Bernard Rabbit
- Kelly Sheridan as Misty Fly and Vapor's mom
- Lee Tockar as Snips and Coriander Cumin
- Samuel Vincent as Flim and Party Favor
- Brian Drummond as Filthy Rich and Double Diamond
- Rebecca Shoichet as Sugar Belle and Night Glider

=== Guest stars ===
==== Single role ====
- Andrew Francis as Mr. Sparkle
- Tara Strong as Mrs. Sparkle
- James Higuchi as Pouch Pony
- Travis Turner as Tender Taps
- Vincent Tong as Garble
- Matt Cowlrick as Dragon Lord Torch
- Ali Milner as Princess Ember
- Terry Klassen as Hoops
- William Samples as Professor Flintheart
- Lili Beaudoin as Plaid Stripes
- Caitlyn Bairstow as Blue Bobbin
- Colleen Winton as Mrs. Shy
- David Godfrey as Mr. Shy
- Ryan Beil as Zephyr Breeze
- Diana Kaarina as Saffron Masala
- Jim Miller as Chargrill Breadwinner
- Fiona Hogan as Zesty Gourmand
- Enid-Raye Adams as Orange Slice
- Patton Oswalt as Quibble Pants
- Michael Daingerfield as Braeburn
- Erin Mathews as Gabby
- David Stuart as Petunia's father
- Jim Byrnes as Gladmane
- Zara Durrani as Trapeze Star
- Alexis Heule as Angel Wings
- Emmett Hall as Sky Stinger
- Rhona Rees as Vapor Trail
- Peter Kelamis as Vapor's dad

==== Multiple roles ====
- Alan Marriott as Buried Lede and Mr. Stripes
- Jason Simpson as Spa Worker and Line Pony
- Kelli Ogmundson as Petunia's mother and Petunia Paleo

== Episodes ==
The directors for each episode are Denny Lu and Tim Stuby.

No. overall	No. in season	Title	Written by	Original release date	Prod. code	US viewers (millions)
118	1	"The Crystalling" (Parts 1 & 2)	Josh Haber	March 26, 2016	601	0.38
119	2	"The Crystalling" (Parts 1 & 2)	Josh Haber	March 26, 2016	602	0.37
Part 1: While teaching her new student, Starlight Glimmer, the ways of friendship, Twilight and her friends are invited to the Crystal Empire to attend the Crystalling, a magical ceremony honoring the birth of Shining Armor and Princess Cadance's newborn baby. Twilight also brings Starlight along to reconnect with her estranged childhood friend Sunburst as her first friendship lesson, but Starlight is anxious to keep Sunburst from learning of her past villainy and tries to avoid the reunion. They eventually meet, and following an awkward conversation with him, Starlight assumes Sunburst to be a successful wizard who has moved on from their friendship. Meanwhile, Twilight and her friends are shocked to discover that the baby is an alicorn with powerful, uncontrollable magic. After the ponies finish the preparations for the ceremony, the baby makes a booming wail that causes the Crystal Heart to shatter into pieces, allowing a deadly snowstorm to descend upon the city. Part 2: Twilight and her friends desperately search for a spell to restore the Crystal Heart and save the Crystal Empire from the snowstorm. Starlight believes Sunburst can help, but when she goes to retrieve him, he despairingly admits he is not a powerful wizard as she believes. Starlight reveals her own past mistakes to him and they reconcile. Using the knowledge he gained from his schooling, Sunburst determines that the baby's Crystalling will repair the heart, stave off the storm and bring her magic under control. Shining Armor and Cadance choose Sunburst as the baby's crystaller so he can help Starlight and the princesses with the Crystalling, and by the end of the ordeal, name their daughter Flurry Heart to mark the occasion.
120	3	"The Gift of the Maud Pie"	Story by : Michael P. Fox, Wil Fox & Josh Haber; Teleplay by : Michael P. Fox & Wil Fox	April 2, 2016	603	0.21
Pinkie Pie joins Rarity on a business trip to Manehattan for an annual sightseeing tour and gift exchange with her sister Maud. As Rarity keeps Maud distracted, Pinkie tries to buy a fancy pouch for Maud's pet rock Boulder, hoping to be able to give a gift as good as the ones Maud always gets for her. The pouch store is closed, but Rarity spots a stallion with the very pouch that Pinkie wants and he trades it for Pinkie's party cannon. After Maud gives Pinkie her gift, confetti for the cannon, she learns what Pinkie has done and returns the pouch for the cannon, telling Pinkie not to treat their gift exchange like a competition.
121	4	"On Your Marks"	Story by : Dave Polsky; Teleplay by : Josh Haber & Dave Polsky	April 9, 2016	604	0.30
After finally earning their cutie marks and understanding their purpose in life, the Cutie Mark Crusaders set out to help other ponies who lack or are discontent with their own cutie marks. They are unable to find many cutie mark problems, however, so they split up to pursue their own interests in the meantime. Feeling alone and indecisive, Apple Bloom takes up ballet and encounters Tender Taps, a blank flank colt who suffers from performance anxiety despite his talent for tap dancing. The Crusaders help Tender Taps overcome his fear and earn his cutie mark, realizing they can use their experiences apart to help others.
122	5	"Gauntlet of Fire"	Joanna Lewis & Kristine Songco	April 16, 2016	605	N/A
While collecting gems with Rarity, Spike starts glowing, meaning that he is being summoned to the Dragons Lands. When Spike arrives with Twilight and Rarity, he finds that he and every other dragon in Equestria have been summoned to participate in the Gauntlet of Fire, a perilous challenge designed to dub the new Dragon Lord. Spike initially has no interest in competing, but changes his mind upon realizing the other competitors, including Garble, who holds a grudge against Spike and his friends, are eager to use the position to pillage Equestria. Receiving support from Twilight and Rarity, Spike saves the life of Princess Ember, the daughter of the current Dragon Lord Torch, who has secretly entered the gauntlet to prove herself a worthy leader. Initially reluctant, Ember teams up with Spike and helps him claim the bloodstone scepter that determines the winner, forcing Garble to stand down when he attacks his friends. Spike then passes the scepter onto Ember, declaring her the true Dragon Lord.
123	6	"No Second Prances"	Nick Confalone	April 30, 2016	606	0.26
Twilight instructs Starlight to make a new friend in Ponyville to invite to a dinner party with Princess Celestia. After her other efforts come up short, Starlight meets Twilight's former adversary Trixie and relates with her over their mutual search for forgiveness for their past villainy. Twilight disapproves of their friendship, doubting Trixie's intentions despite previously forgiving her. Appalled by Twilight's lack of trust, Starlight chooses to skip the dinner to act as Trixie's assistant for a magic stunt. When Twilight confronts them before the show, Trixie thoughtlessly brags that she has been using her friendship with Starlight in an act of revenge against Twilight, which devastates Starlight. Noticing Trixie's heartbreak over deceiving her friend, Twilight convinces Starlight to give Trixie another chance. Starlight helps Trixie complete her stunt just in time, and the three ponies make amends.
124	7	"Newbie Dash"	Story by : Dave Polsky & Dave Rapp; Teleplay by : Dave Rapp	May 7, 2016	607	0.19
Rainbow Dash finally joins the Wonderbolts after one of its members retires. During her first day of flight practice, she makes a rookie mistake and crashes into a trash can, leading her teammates to calling her "Rainbow Crash", a nickname previously used by bullies. Hurt by this nickname, Rainbow Dash tries to find other ways to change the others' impression of her by mimicking her friends, without success. When the Wonderbolts perform a show in Ponyville, Rainbow Dash enlists Scootaloo's help to perform an unscheduled stunt to impress them, but it backfires and results in her suffering an even more disastrous crash. After the show, the Wonderbolts explain to Rainbow Dash that they all have humiliating nicknames, and that they already regard her highly for her past accomplishments. They keep her on the team, though Spitfire puts her on a month-long probation for her actions.
125	8	"A Hearth's Warming Tail"	Michael Vogel	May 14, 2016	608	N/A
On Hearth's Warming Eve, Starlight does not feel like celebrating, so Twilight decides to read her favorite holiday story, A Hearth's Warming Tale, to help her appreciate the holiday better. In the story, Snowfall Frost, a cold-hearted unicorn who despises Hearth's Warming, prepares a spell to erase the holiday from existence. Her actions draw the attention of three spirits, who intend to dissuade her from casting the spell by showing her visions of various Hearth's Warming scenes. First, the Spirit of Hearth's Warming Past reminds Snowfall of the holiday spirit she abandoned in her youth to focus on her studies. Next, the Spirit of Hearth's Warming Presents helps Snowfall understand the spirit of friendship that the holiday represents. Finally, the Spirit of Hearth's Warming Yet to Come reveals that Snowfall's spell would leave Equestria defenseless against the Windigos' eternal winter, which convinces Snowfall to change her ways. After the story ends, Starlight similarly realizes the importance of Hearth's Warming and joins her friends in the festivities.
126	9	"The Saddle Row Review"	Nick Confalone	May 21, 2016	609	0.25
Rarity and her friends are interviewed for a newspaper review of Rarity's new boutique in Manehattan. While Rarity believes the store's grand opening was a perfect success, her friends openly recount their numerous blunders and last-minute solutions that they hid from Rarity during the preparations. With their mistakes exposed in the review, they fear Rarity will be disappointed in them for almost ruining the opening, but to their surprise, the review ends with a glowing assessment of Rarity and her friends' individual contributions that have helped ensure the store's success.
127	10	"Applejack's "Day" Off"	Story by : Neal Dusedau, Michael P. Fox & Wil Fox; Teleplay by : Michael P. Fox & Wil Fox	May 28, 2016	610	0.23
Rarity wishes to spend time with Applejack at the spa, but Applejack is too busy to make good on her promises. Twilight and Spike agree to do Applejack's chores by her exact instructions, freeing up an hour for Applejack to spend with Rarity. To Rarity's annoyance, Applejack spends most of this time fixing the spa's plumbing, which has been accidentally causing larger problems around the spa. Applejack returns to the farm to find that Twilight and Spike have not yet completed their task due to too many unnecessary steps in Applejack's instructions. Twilight, Spike and Rarity help Applejack streamline her workload, finally allowing her to take the rest of the day off.
128	11	"Flutter Brutter"	Story by : Meghan McCarthy; Teleplay by : Dave Rapp	June 4, 2016	611	N/A
Fluttershy's younger brother Zephyr Breeze moves into their parents' house after his attempt to become a mane therapist goes wrong. Fluttershy convinces Zephyr to move out, only for him to move into her cottage. She tries to help him find a job, but he manages to find ways to avoid doing any work, so she kicks him out. Later feeling sorry for Zephyr when he takes up living in the woods, Fluttershy understands that he feels unable to do anything because of his fear of failure. Encouraged by Fluttershy to keep trying despite his frustrations, Zephyr commits to becoming a mane stylist and eventually graduates from his class.
129	12	"Spice Up Your Life"	Michael Vogel	June 11, 2016	612	N/A
After Twilight and Starlight reactivate the map, which has been inactive ever since they used it to travel back in time, it sends Pinkie Pie and Rarity on a friendship mission to Canterlot. When they arrive, they find the Tasty Treat, a struggling Indian-style restaurant where the owner, Coriander Cumin, and his chef daughter, Saffron Masala, are too busy arguing with each other to help their business. Pinkie and Rarity decide to help give the restaurant a positive review from well-known food critic Zesty Gourmand, but because of their conflicting views; Rarity encouraging Coriander to conform to Zesty's specific standards, and Pinkie encouraging Saffron to be unique, their efforts fail to impress Zesty. Undeterred, they manage to reconcile their differences to bring an audience of ponies to the restaurant in defiance of Zesty's dictatorial opinions about food, renewing Coriander and Saffron's passion for cooking.
130	13	"Stranger Than Fan Fiction"	Josh Haber & Michael Vogel	July 30, 2016	613	0.25
Rainbow Dash attends a Daring Do convention where she meets another avid fan named Quibble Pants. They quickly become friends until Quibble criticizes the newer Daring Do books as unrealistic, which upsets Rainbow Dash, who secretly knows Daring Do is real. Daring Do approaches Rainbow Dash for help looking out for Dr. Caballeron, who is following her in her search for a priceless artifact in a jungle temple. After Rainbow Dash runs into Quibble again and makes a scene, Caballeron abducts them both and takes them into the jungle. Quibble believes their adventure to the temple is all a staged role-play until a fantastic creature nearly eats them. Daring Do arrives and saves them, finally convincing Quibble that her stories are true. He and Rainbow Dash help Daring Do find the artifact and escape the temple, after which Daring Do gets rid of Caballeron and directs them to safety. As they return to the convention, Quibble admits that he still dislikes the newer books, but has come to respect what Rainbow Dash admires about them, mending their friendship.
131	14	"The Cart Before the Ponies"	Story by : Ed Valentine & Michael Vogel; Teleplay by : Ed Valentine	August 6, 2016	614	N/A
Ponyville holds its annual Applewood Derby, a kart race where the school ponies are to drive their own self-made vehicles with the help of older ponies. The Cutie Mark Crusaders enlist Rainbow Dash, Applejack and Rarity to assist with their karts, but they get carried away in their excitement for the derby and completely ignore the different design ideas that the Crusaders want to try, and eventually take over as drivers. During the race, they crash into each other and destroy their karts in a pile-up. The Crusaders yell at them for ruining the derby, causing Rainbow Dash, Applejack and Rarity to apologize while also telling the Crusaders not to assume that their elders always know best. They help the Crusaders rebuild their karts the way they want, sitting out to let them enjoy the derby.
132	15	"28 Pranks Later"	Story by : Meghan McCarthy; Teleplay by : F.M. De Marco	August 13, 2016	615	0.20
Rainbow Dash goes on a pranking spree around Ponyville, irritating her friends, who find her jokes unfunny and hurtful. Failing to reason with her, the townsfolk send Pinkie Pie, the only pony not offended by the pranks, to convince her to stop. Instead, Rainbow Dash divulges her plan to prank the entire town with joke cookies made to turn their mouths rainbow-colored, feeding one to Pinkie as a demonstration. Later, Pinkie falls sick with an appetite for more joke cookies while Rainbow Dash helps sell them around town. That night, Rainbow Dash checks on Pinkie to find that the cookies have turned her and everypony else in town into cookie-craving zombies. Once a terrified Rainbow Dash apologizes for her prank, the townsfolk reveal the entire outbreak to be an elaborate prank devised by Pinkie to teach her to think about other ponies' feelings first before she goes along with the pranks.
133	16	"The Times They Are a Changeling"	Story by : Kevin Burke, Michael Vogel & Chris "Doc" Wyatt; Teleplay by : Kevin Burke & Chris "Doc" Wyatt	August 20, 2016	616	0.27
During a visit to the Crystal Empire, Twilight, Starlight and Spike find the city in a state of panic over a changeling sighting. After getting lost during the search effort, Spike is rescued by the changeling, Thorax, from falling down a chasm. Realizing Thorax only wants to make friends despite facing prejudice from ponies, Spike introduces him to the city disguised as a longtime friend named "Crystal Hoof". When Spike shows Flurry Heart to Thorax, her love overwhelms him, causing him to drop his disguise, and Spike struggles to stand up for Thorax as his friends chase him away. Feeling guilty, Spike reunites with Thorax and defends him against the ponies, professing that Thorax is his friend and deserves another chance like anypony else. His impassioned plea touches the ponies, who welcome Thorax into their community.
134	17	"Dungeons & Discords"	Nick Confalone	August 27, 2016	617	0.28
Discord becomes lonely when Fluttershy embarks on a trip to Yakyakistan with her friends. Feeling sorry for Discord, Spike and Big Mac invite him to their get-together to cheer him up while the others are away. To Discord's disappointment, their evening involves playing a tabletop role-playing game called Ogres & Oubliettes and he quickly grows bored and attempts to take over the evening with his own ideas of fun. When Spike and Big Mac remain firm in playing their game, Discord angrily teleports them to a dimension where the game's monsters and danger are real. Fed up, they eject Discord from the game, leaving him dejected once more. They quickly feel guilty and allow him to stay, finding that his real-life version of their game is much more entertaining. Fluttershy and her friends return to find them enjoying a toned-down version of the game.
135	18	"Buckball Season"	Jennifer Skelly	September 3, 2016	618	N/A
Applejack is challenged by her cousin Braeburn to a game of "buckball" in Appleloosa. While recruiting new players for Ponyville's team, she and Rainbow Dash are surprised to find that Pinkie Pie and Fluttershy are much better players than they are and lets them take their place. Snails is also recruited for his unexpected ball-catching skills. Applejack and Rainbow Dash put them through rigorous training exercises, causing Pinkie and Fluttershy to feel pressured and lose their edge. When Applejack and Rainbow Dash try encouraging them by gathering all of Ponyville to cheer them on, Pinkie and Fluttershy fear of disappointing the town and refuse to play. Realizing their competitiveness has ruined the sport for Pinkie and Fluttershy, who play best when having fun, Applejack and Rainbow Dash convince them to help them practice in order to rebuild their confidence. Pinkie and Fluttershy regain their love of the sport, motivating them to win the game against Appleloosa.
136	19	"The Fault in Our Cutie Marks"	Story by : Josh Haber & Meghan McCarthy; Teleplay by : Ed Valentine	September 10, 2016	619	N/A
The Cutie Mark Crusaders are approached by Gabby, a griffon who is obsessed with cutie marks and desires one for herself. Not knowing if it is possible for griffons to have cutie marks, the Crusaders try anyway by taking Gabby through a list of helpful activities to see if she gets one. Although Gabby excels at everything she attempts, no cutie mark appears, and the Crusaders despair that their task is impossible. Feeling sorry for the Crusaders, Gabby surprises them by revealing a fake cutie mark she has "earned", but they soon discover the truth when she suddenly tries to leave. The Crusaders determine that, despite her lack of a mark, Gabby still has a purpose in life by helping others, and they made her an honorary member.
137	20	"Viva Las Pegasus"	Story by : Kevin Burke, Michael Vogel & Chris "Doc" Wyatt; Teleplay by : Kevin Burke & Chris "Doc" Wyatt	September 17, 2016	620	N/A
When the map sends Applejack and Fluttershy on a friendship mission to Las Pegasus, they come to a popular resort run by a generous pony named Gladmane. They have trouble finding a problem to solve until they encounter Flim and Flam in the middle of a feud. Fluttershy speculates that their mission is to help the brothers reconcile, but Applejack refuses out of her family's bitter history with them. Searching for problems elsewhere, they discover that Gladmane has been starting arguments between his employees, including Flim and Flam, in a ploy to gain their trust and continued services at the resort. Applejack reluctantly helps end Flim and Flam's argument and realizes their conniving ways are necessary to stopping Gladmane, so they devise an elaborate scheme that tricks Gladmane into publicly exposing his plans. Although the mission is a success, Flim and Flam promptly take over the resort to continue their scamming business together.
138	21	"Every Little Thing She Does"	Michael Vogel	September 24, 2016	621	0.21
Twilight notices that Starlight's progress with her friendship lessons has been slacking, so she assigns her with several activities to do with their friends while she and Spike are away in Canterlot for the day. Desperate to complete all her lessons at once to impress Twilight, Starlight hypnotizes her friends into carrying out their individual activities, but her poor directions cause them to make a total mess of the castle. Upon returning, Twilight lifts the spell on her friends and reprimands Starlight, saying that the true purpose of the activities was to get to know her friends better. After Starlight apologizes to them, they help her clean up the castle, and Starlight manages to complete her lessons in one day.
139	22	"P.P.O.V. (Pony Point of View)"	Story by : Kevin Burke, Michael P. Fox, Wil Fox & Chris "Doc" Wyatt; Teleplay by : Michael P. Fox & Wil Fox	October 1, 2016	622	0.19
Rarity, Pinkie Pie, and Applejack furiously return from a disastrous boating trip and refuse to speak to each other. Twilight and Spike question them over what went wrong, each giving a contradictory story that ends with their boat capsizing: Rarity blames Applejack for ruining her luxury cruise idea by steering the boat into a storm; Pinkie blames Rarity for getting rid of her party snacks; and Applejack blames both Rarity and Pinkie for disrupting her planned seafaring treasure hunt. After comparing the stories, Twilight notices a common thread in the form of a plate of cucumber sandwiches falling into bubbling water. She brings them on another cruise and proves that a cucumber-eating tri-horned bunyip is responsible for sinking the boat. Rarity, Pinkie, Applejack realize they have been fighting for no reason, and they promise to talk out their differences in the future.
140	23	"Where the Apple Lies"	Story by : Meghan McCarthy & Dave Rapp; Teleplay by : Dave Rapp	October 8, 2016	623	0.27
After Apple Bloom tells a white lie to hide a mistake, her family tells her a story of an even bigger fiasco caused by a series of lies Applejack told when she was a filly. In a flashback, Granny Smith disapproves of a rash business deal Applejack makes with Filthy Rich, who threatens to end business with the Apples when Applejack tries to back out. Because her family relies on the Rich family's funds, Applejack stops Filthy by falsely claiming that Granny is sick. To keep him from learning the truth, Applejack makes up a story that Granny is hospitalized with apple blight. When he and his fiancée Spoiled Milk go to visit her, Applejack convinces Granny to come to the hospital in a doctor's disguise and leaves her reluctant brother Big Mac to pose as Granny, who obliviously prepares to perform public surgery on him. This forces Applejack to tell everypony the truth, resulting in her present value of honesty.
141	24	"Top Bolt"	Story by : Joanna Lewis, Meghan McCarthy & Kristine Songco; Teleplay by : Joanna Lewis & Kristine Songco	October 15, 2016	624	N/A
When the map sends Twilight and Rainbow Dash on a friendship mission to Wonderbolts Academy, they meet two particular trainees: the talented Sky Stinger and his seemingly less skilled partner Vapor Trail. While observing them, Rainbow Dash and Twilight recognize that Vapor, who dislikes being the center of attention, has been silently providing wind support for Sky, who fails to notice his own poor flight performance without her. Twilight and Rainbow Dash attempt to train them separately while keeping Sky from finding out Vapor's actions to maintain his confidence. When he cockily refuses to cooperate, Vapor blurts the truth to him, which ruins their friendship. Realizing they have approached the problem the wrong way, Rainbow Dash and Twilight persuade them to help each other, successfully allowing them to pass the academy entrance exam.
142	25	"To Where and Back Again" (Parts 1 & 2)	Josh Haber & Michael Vogel	October 22, 2016	625	0.26
143	26	"To Where and Back Again" (Parts 1 & 2)	Josh Haber & Michael Vogel	October 22, 2016	626	0.24
Part 1: Starlight has been invited to the Sunset Festival at her old village, but she is afraid the townsfolk have not fully forgiven her after her cruel dictatorship, so she brings Trixie to accompany her. When they arrive, the townsfolk happily put Starlight in charge of the festivities, but she gets overwhelmed and flees. She and Trixie return to Ponyville to find Twilight and her friends being strangely dismissive of Starlight's misfortune at the village, despite showing their support earlier. During a nightmare that night, Princess Luna alerts Starlight that the changelings have returned and replaced herself and all of Equestria's protectors, including Twilight and her friends, in their plan to take over the kingdom. Thorax also approaches to warn Starlight and Trixie that his kind has taken over the Crystal Empire, and Discord, the last remaining powerful being in Equestria, teleports himself and the others to the Changeling Kingdom, where their friends are being held. Part 2: Starlight, Trixie, Thorax and Discord set out to rescue their friends from the Changeling Kingdom, where their magic is negated by the power of Queen Chrysalis' enchanted throne. The others turn to Starlight to lead them, though despite her hesitations, she manages to direct the others in misguiding the changeling drones they encounter. When Discord is caught in a trap of Fluttershy impersonators, Trixie sacrifices herself to his impostor so Starlight and Thorax can find and destroy Chrysalis' throne. Thorax attempts to distract Chrysalis by disguising himself as Starlight, but Chrysalis sees through his deception and begins forcefully draining the love he has collected from the Crystal Empire. Encouraged by Starlight, Thorax willingly gives Chrysalis his love, causing a powerful burst of magic that metamorphoses him into a new form. His transformation inspires the other changelings to do the same, which destroys the throne and frees all of Starlight's captured friends. Rejecting Starlight's offer of redemption, Chrysalis vows revenge and flees. Thorax becomes the hive's new leader while Starlight returns to her village's festival with her friends.

== DVD release ==
My Little Pony: Friendship Is Magic: Season Six
Set details	Special features
26 episodes; 4-disc set; 16:9 aspect ratio; Subtitles: English	2016 San Diego Comic-Con Panel; Sing-Alongs ("Out on My Own", "It's Gonna Work", "A Changeling Can Change" and "Find the Purpose in Your Life")
Release dates
Region 1
November 7, 2017
