= The Times They Are a Changeling =

- My Little Pony: Friendship Is Magic episode
- Spike (right) introduces Thorax (left) as his friend.
- Episode no.: Season 6 Episode 16
- Story by: Kevin Burke, Michael Vogel & Chris "Doc" Wyatt
- Teleplay by: Kevin Burke & Chris "Doc" Wyatt
- Original air date: August 20, 2016
- Running time: 22 minutes

Episode chronology
← Previous "28 Pranks Later"	Next → "Dungeons & Discords"
- My Little Pony: Friendship Is Magic season 6

"The Times They Are a Changeling" is the sixteenth episode of the sixth season of the animated television series My Little Pony: Friendship Is Magic. The episode was written by Kevin Burke, Michael Vogel, and Chris "Doc" Wyatt (story) and Kevin Burke and Wyatt (teleplay). It originally aired on Discovery Family on August 20, 2016. In this episode, Spike befriends a changeling named Thorax who wants to make friends despite facing prejudice from ponies, and must defend him when his true identity is revealed to the Crystal Empire.

The title of the episode is a reference to the Bob Dylan song "The Times They Are a-Changin'".

== Plot ==
Twilight Sparkle and Starlight Glimmer travel to the Crystal Empire to visit Princess Cadance and baby Flurry Heart, accompanied by Spike who disguises himself to avoid overwhelming attention as "Spike the Brave and Glorious." They discover the Empire in panic over reports of a changeling infiltrator, with security heightened due to fears that changelings might target Flurry Heart's abundant love energy. During the search mission in the Arctic Wastes, Spike becomes separated from the royal guards and encounters Thorax, the changeling responsible for the terror, but he defies expectations by saving Spike from a dangerous fall rather than attacking him. Thorax explains that he has always been different from other changelings, as he prefers to share love rather than steal it, and has lived alone since the Canterlot invasion while searching for friendship.

Spike attempts to convince Shining Armor and the guards that Thorax poses no threat, but they dismiss his claims as impossible since "there's no such thing as a nice changeling." He then disguises Thorax as a Crystal Pony named "Crystal Hoof" and successfully introduces him to Twilight and other ponies, but when Thorax meets baby Flurry Heart, the overwhelming love causes him to lose control of his disguise, which reveals his true form. Thorax flees, and Spike seeks out his friend to apologize and brings him before the assembled Crystal Ponies, performing a heartfelt song about how any creature can change and deserves friendship. Twilight ashamedly supports Spike's brave stance and officially welcomes Thorax, followed by Princess Cadance and Shining Armor extending citizenship and friendship.

== Reception ==
Johnnie Jungleguts of Yahoo! Entertainment ranked the episode eighth among the best My Little Pony episodes and wrote that since changelings "were depicted as monolithically villainous in earlier appearances," it was "almost necessary for a storyline where not all changelings are dangerous." Jungleguts praised the episode for showing "ponies look a little harder at their prejudice," though he called Spike's "A Changeling Can Change" song "a little corny."

Gerry O. of KIDS FIRST! praised "The Times They Are a Changeling" as his favorite episode from the Exploring the Crystal Empire DVD collection, describing how "one of the characters discovers a creature known as a changeling that can take the form of any other character" who "is not driven by hate and anger" but instead "struggles to prove to others that he is not a monster but just someone who wants a friend." He called it "a fantastic moral" and "a marvelous message" about how individuals should not be judged for the actions of their entire race or nation, noting its importance "for both kids and adults to listen to in today's world."

== See also ==
- List of My Little Pony: Friendship Is Magic episodes
