= The Climb (2002 film) =

- Directed by: John Schmidt
- Written by: Patrick Egan; Robert Pierce
- Produced by: John Schmidt for Dean River Productions
- Starring: Jason George; Ned Vaughn; Dabney Coleman; David Stuart; Kyli Santiago
- Cinematography: Roger Boller
- Edited by: John Schmidt
- Distributed by: World Wide Pictures
- Release date: February 22, 2002
- Running time: 101 minutes
- Country: United States
- Language: English

The Climb is a 2002 American drama film directed by John Schmidt and distributed by World Wide Pictures.

== Plot summary ==
This is a Christian film about two rock climbers who meet during a rescue and get a chance to realize a climb of a lifetime, but they have to work together. Derrick (Jason George) is a selfish person who wants to do the big climb solo, and Michael (Ned Vaughn) is a Christian with a good heart. They are a special team, two totally different people with different life goals and views—but they use the same climbing technique. There are themes of egoism, responsibility, and forgiveness.
