= David Stuart (actor) =

Canadian actor (born 1965)

- Born: 19 November 1965 (age 60); Edmonton, Alberta

David Stuart (born 19 December 1965) is a Canadian actor, best known for his work as Pete in the Supernatural Season 7 episode The Girl with the Dungeons and Dragons Tattoo.

== Personal life and education ==
Born in Edmonton, Alberta, Stuart grew up in Fredericton, New Brunswick. He obtained his Bachelor of Arts degree in theatre at the University of Victoria, and attended the American Academy of Dramatic Arts in Los Angeles.

== Career ==
While studying his craft, Stuart worked as a background performer in films (Bird on a Wire) and television (21 Jump Street, episode 47). His first guest-starring role was on the 1988 television series Time Exposures alongside Peter Outerbridge (Lucky Number Slevin, ReGenesis). From there, he earned roles on The X-Files, Touched by an Angel and Jake 2.0. During this time, he had a supporting role on the big screen in The Climb alongside Dabney Coleman (Domino, The Guardian) as well as in the television movie Perfect Murder, Perfect Town: JonBenét and the City of Boulder with Kris Kristofferson (Blade), Marg Helgenberger (CSI: Crime Scene Investigation), and Ronny Cox (Stargate SG-1). Other early credits include Three Moons Over Milford, Criminal Intent, Inconvenience, Suspicious Agenda, The Marshal

More recently Stuart can be seen in Supernatural, Mission: Impossible – Ghost Protocol, Continuum, Hiccups, Eureka, Kyle XY, Flash Gordon and Whistler. He appeared in the Danny DeVito / Matthew Broderick Christmas movie Deck the Halls and in Sweet Amerika (2008) as the villain alongside Gulshan Grover (Bollywood’s legendary Badman).

Stuart has performed in over 100 commercials, including a Kyocera spot directed by Jason Reitman (Thank You for Smoking) and the Ford Mustang tribute to Bullitt and Field of Dreams titled Cornfield, which featured Steve McQueen.

Stuart has lent his voice to a number of projects including Jackhammer, on which he also contributed sound work, Girlfriend Experience, Area 88, Daisenki and Dysfunction.

== Selected filmography ==
- My Little Pony: Friendship is Magic Season 6 episode The Fault in Our Cutie Marks (2016)
- Supernatural Season 7 episode The Girl with the Dungeons and Dragons Tattoo (2012)
- Continuum episode Fast Times (2012)
- Mission: Impossible – Ghost Protocol (2011)
- Hiccups episode Commercial Success (2011)
- Eureka episode Sight Unseen (2007)
- Kyle XY episode House of Cards (2007)
- Flash Gordon episode Pride (2007)
- Whistler episode Endgame (2007)
- Three Moons Over Milford episode Confessions of a Dangerous Moon (2006)
- Deck the Halls (2006)
- Supernatural Season 2 episode Everybody Loves A Clown (2006)
- Jake 2.0 episode Jerry 2.0 (2003)
- The Climb (2002)
- Touched by an Angel episodes Penalty Box (2001) and Death in the Family (2001)
- The Marshal episodes Gone Fishing (1995) and The Great Train Robbery (1995)
- The X-Files episode Colony (1995)
- Bird on a Wire (1990)
- 21 Jump Street episode The Dreaded Return of Russell Buckins (1989)
