= Quibble Pants =

Fictional character from My Little Pony

- My Little Pony character
- Quibble Pants as he appears in "Stranger Than Fan Fiction"
- First appearance: "Stranger Than Fan Fiction" (2016)
- Created by: Josh Haber; Michael Vogel
- Voiced by: Patton Oswalt

In-universe information
- Species: Earth Pony
- Spouse: Clear Sky
- Children: Wind Sprint (stepdaughter)

Quibble Pants is a fictional character who appears in the fourth incarnation of Hasbro's My Little Pony toyline and media franchise, specifically in My Little Pony: Friendship Is Magic (2010–2019). He is voiced by Patton Oswalt.

An analytical earth pony with strong opinions about the Daring Do book series, Quibble Pants made his debut in the sixth season episode "Stranger Than Fan Fiction" and later appeared in the ninth season episode "Common Ground".

== Appearances ==
=== Fourth My Little Pony incarnation (2010–2019) ===
==== My Little Pony: Friendship Is Magic ====
Quibble Pants makes his first appearance in the sixth season episode "Stranger Than Fan Fiction", where he attends a Daring Do convention in Manehattan. As a devoted fan of the Daring Do series, he expresses strong criticisms about the later books in the series. His analytical and nitpicky approach to the series initially puts him at odds with Rainbow Dash, who prefers the adventure aspects of the books.

Quibble returns in the ninth season episode "Common Ground", in which he has entered into a relationship with unicorn mare Clear Sky and become a stepfather to her pegasus daughter Wind Sprint.

== Reception and analysis ==
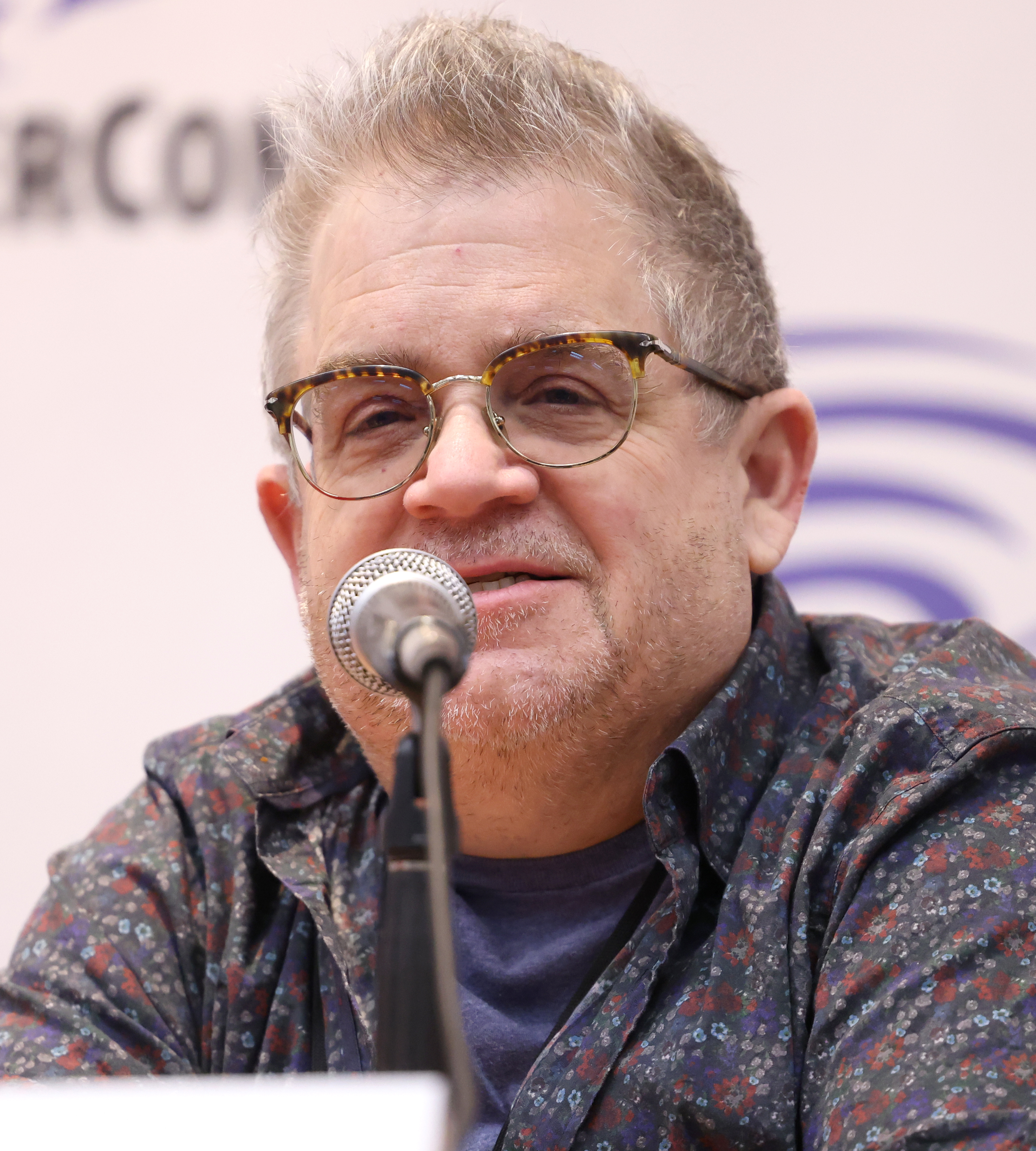
Patton Oswalt provided the voice for Quibble Pants. His daughter Alice voiced Wind Spirit (Quibble's stepdaughter) and her stepmother Meredith Salenger voiced Clear Sky (Wind Spirit's mother).

In a 2024 study examining fatherhood in Friendship Is Magic, Samuel Oatley identified Quibble Pants as one of three male characters (along with Cheese Sandwich and Filthy Rich) who escape the show's typical pattern of either othering single fathers or creating symbiotic fathers who lose their individual identity within marriage. Oatley wrote that Quibble "sidesteps the issue of paternal characterization by effectively being pushed into fatherhood after the fact", as his personality as "an over-analyzing, nitpicky fan of the in-universe Daring Do novels is established through his interactions with Rainbow Dash" before his paternal role is introduced. Oatley highlighted how Quibble's relationship conflict with his stepdaughter Wind Sprint "becomes easy to understand when factoring in his previous depiction as a single stallion immersed in a specific fandom", as Wind Sprint's obsession with buckball contrasts with "Quibble's more literary focused fandom". According to Oatley, while Quibble eventually enters into a relationship with Clear Sky, "his own personality shines through their relationship to the point where the viewer understands that Quibble very much exists as a character outside of his romantic and paternal relationship".

In a critical analysis of "Stranger Than Fan Fiction", author Jen A. Blue examined Quibble Pants as a representation of problematic attitudes within the brony fandom, particularly the tendency to treat fictional works as independent realities rather than human-created artifacts. Blue argued that Quibble has organized his life around an imagined "Daring Do universe", leading him to judge the books based on their success at depicting this fictional reality rather than as creative works. Blue highlighted how Quibble's approach exemplifies what Blue calls the "secondary creation" problem in fandom, where fans become blind to the fact that fiction consists of real objects created by real people in the real world. According to Blue, Quibble's initial refusal to accept the reality of his kidnapping serves as a metaphor for this fandom issue, as he interprets real events only through the lens of fictional narratives; while Quibble eventually learns to recognize reality, his character serves as a critique of fans who organize their lives around fictional universes while denying their real-world validity.

In an article analyzing the inclusion of children in fandom studies, Kyra Hunting cited the episode "Stranger Than Fan Fiction" as an example of children's media depicting fan tensions and described Quibble Pants as an "aptly named" fan "who complains about every detail of the later books."

== See also ==
- List of My Little Pony: Friendship Is Magic characters
- Rainbow Dash
- My Little Pony: Friendship Is Magic fandom
