= A Hearth's Warming Tail =

- My Little Pony: Friendship Is Magic episode
- In the story within a story, the Spirit of Hearth's Warming Yet to Come (right, represented by Princess Luna) warns Snowfall Frost (represented by Starlight Glimmer) of the tragic outcome of her actions.
- Episode no.: Season 6 Episode 8
- Directed by: Denny Lu; Tim Stuby; Jim Miller (supervising director)
- Written by: Michael Vogel
- Editing by: Rachel Kenzie (animatic editor); Mat Garneau (offline editor); Tom Harris (online editor); Josh Haber (story editor)
- Original air date: May 14, 2016
- Running time: 22 minutes

Guest appearances
- William Samples as Professor Flintheart; Aloma Steele as Princess Luna (singing voice)

Episode chronology
← Previous "Newbie Dash"	Next → "The Saddle Row Review"
- My Little Pony: Friendship Is Magic (season 6)#Episodes

"A Hearth's Warming Tail" is the eighth episode of the sixth season of the animated television series My Little Pony: Friendship Is Magic and the 125th episode of the series overall. Directed by Denny Lu and Tim Stuby, written by Michael Vogel and produced by Devon Cody, it first aired on May 14, 2016, on Discovery Family.

In "A Hearth's Warming Tail", as Ponyville gets ready to celebrate Hearth's Warming (the series' lore equivalent to Christmas) in Twilight Sparkle (Tara Strong)'s castle, Starlight Glimmer (Kelly Sheridan) prefers not to be a part of the festivities. To convince her of the importance of Hearth's Warming, Twilight and Spike (Cathy Weseluck) tell her the tale of Snowfall Frost, a cold-hearted unicorn who despises Hearth's Warming and swears to erase it magically.

The episode mainly consists of a depiction of the tale itself, with its characters being represented by the main characters of the show; the story is adapted from Charles Dickens' classic 1843 Christmas novel A Christmas Carol, with Snowfall Frost representing Ebenezer Scrooge and being visited by three spirits who wish to teach her the importance of the holiday. "A Hearth's Warming Tail" has been described as one of the series' "musical episodes", and features six songs composed by Daniel Ingram and orchestrated by Caleb Chan, with lyrics by Vogel and Ingram.

The episode received acclaim from critics and fans; its pacing and songs were widely praised, in particular, "Luna's Future" (the first solo song for Princess Luna), sung by Princess Luna (voiced by Aloma Steele).

== Plot ==
The ponies of Ponyville prepare to celebrate Hearth's Warming together in Twilight's castle. However, when Twilight and Spike ask Starlight if she is ready to celebrate, she says she "might just skip it", as she considers it "a day dedicated to presents and candy". Twilight tries to explain that Hearth's Warming is mostly about spending time with friends and family, but Starlight is still not interested. To convince her, Twilight decides to read her favorite holiday story, A Hearth's Warming Tale.

The tale takes place during a Hearth's Warming many years ago and centers around a cold-hearted stingy unicorn mage named Snowfall Frost, who believes the holiday to be a waste of time and just an excuse to party when it could be used for more practical reasons and doesn't believe the holiday's origins when the three pony tribes joined in friendship to drive back the Windigos that were causing winter storms. After accidentally granting her assistant Snowdash, portrayed by Rainbow Dash, a holiday leave, Snowfall decides to use her magic to cast a spell to erase the holiday forever.

A few minutes later and right before she can cast her spell, the Spirit of Hearth's Warming Past, portrayed by Applejack, appears in front of her. To change her mind about the holiday, the ghost travels with Snowfall to her own childhood. Snowfall witnesses her younger self enjoying the holiday before being told by her professor that the holiday's origin is a lie, and in order to become the powerful unicorn she wants to be, she has to spend Hearth's Warming studying instead of celebrating. Taking her professor's words to heart, Snowfall then disregards Hearth's Warming altogether and isolates herself from all the other ponies to focus only on her work.

The adult Snowfall wakes up in her home back in her time, only to be visited by the Spirit of Hearth's Warming Presents, portrayed by Pinkie Pie, who teaches her the importance of presents is the pleasure to give to and receive from loved ones and she shows her the other ponies, including Snowdash and her friends Merry and Flutterholly, portrayed by Rarity and Fluttershy, respectively, enjoying their time together and making fun of Snowfall's seriousness. Snowfall suddenly finds herself in a deserted land covered in snow, where she encounters the Spirit of Hearth's Warming Yet to Come, portrayed by Princess Luna, who tells her that she will succeed in erasing the holiday, thus permitting the return of the Windigos and covering Equestria in a blanket of eternal snow.

Horrified by the consequences her spell would have, Snowfall awakens once again in the present, realizing the future can still be avoided. She joins the other ponies in their celebration of Hearth's Warming, understanding the importance of the holiday. Finishing the story, Twilight encourages Starlight to join them in the celebration, which she does, and all of Ponyville celebrates Hearth's Warming together.

== Cast ==
- Kelly Sheridan as Starlight Glimmer/Snowfall Frost, a stingy, cynical and arrogant pony, whose sheer miserly nature leads her to reject Heart's Warming and all things which engender happiness with a passion.
- Ashleigh Ball as Applejack/Ghost of Heart's Warming Past, the first spirit that haunts Frost in order to prompt her to repent.
- Andrea Libman as Pinkie Pie/Ghost of Heart's Warming Presents, the second spirit. She is depicted as a towering pony with pink hair, a candy laurel wreath, and a yellow ermine robe.
  - Shannon Chan-Kent, Pinkie Pie's singing voice.
- Tabitha St. Germain as Princess Luna/Ghost of Heart's Warming Yet to Come, the third and final spirit. She is depicted as a shadowy Grim Reaper.
  - Aloma Steele, Princess Luna's singing voice.
- Ashleigh Ball as Rainbow Dash/Snowdash, Frost's optimistic and kindly assistant.
- Andrea Libman as Fluttershy/Flutterholly, one of Snowdash's friends at the party.
- Tabitha St. Germain as Rarity/Merry, one of Snowdash's friends at the party.
- William Samples as Professor Flintheart, Snowfall Frost's firm teacher from her childhood.
- Tara Strong as Twilight Sparkle, the Narrator.
  - Rebecca Shoichet, Twilight Sparkle's singing voice.
- Cathy Weseluck as Spike.

== Songs ==
#	Title	Music	Lyrics	Performer (character) (Note: In a case of several characters providing lead vocals, the performers are listed in the order in which their characters (or the first of their character in a case where they voice several) start singing.)	Backing vocals
1	"Hearth's Warming Eve Is Here Once Again"	Daniel Ingram	Michael Vogel	Andrea Libman (Fluttershy), Ashleigh Ball (Rainbow Dash, Applejack), Shannon Chan-Kent (Pinkie), Kazumi Evans (Rarity)	Ensemble (Ponyville)
2	"Say Goodbye to the Holiday"	Daniel Ingram	Michael Vogel	Kelly Sheridan (Starlight Glimmer/Snowfall Frost)	-
3	"The Seeds of the Past"	Daniel Ingram	Michael Vogel	Ashleigh Ball (Applejack/Ghost of Hearth's Warming Past), Kelly Sheridan (Starlight Glimmer/Snowfall Frost)	-
4	"Pinkie's Present"	Daniel Ingram	Michael Vogel	Shannon Chan-Kent (Pinkie Pie/Ghost of Hearth's Warming Presents)	-
5	"Luna's Future"	Daniel Ingram	Daniel Ingram, Michael Vogel	Aloma Steele (Princess Luna/Ghost of Hearth's Warming Future)	-
6	"Hearth's Warming Eve Is Here Once Again (Reprise)"	Daniel Ingram	Daniel Ingram, Michael Vogel	Kelly Sheridan (Starlight Glimmer)	Rebecca Shoichet (Twilight Sparkle), Ashleigh Ball (Rainbow Dash, Applejack), Shannon Chan-Kent (Pinkie), Kazumi Evans (Rarity), Andrea Libman (Fluttershy), Cathy Weseluck (Spike), Ensemble (Ponyville)

== Production and promotion ==
The opening song of the episode, "Hearth's Warming Eve Is Here Once Again", was first previewed at the 2016 New York Toy Fair.

According to writer Michael Vogel, in the original version of the script, the character of Jacob Marley from A Christmas Carol was planned to appear, and would have been represented by Discord; this was cut to save time for rest of the plot. Also in the episode's original draft, Princess Luna's Spirit of Hearth's Warming Future did not have a song due to a lack of space in the episode's running time, but the "directors and creative team all realized she needed one".

The animation sequences for the songs "Hearth's Warming Eve Is Here Once Again", "Say Goodbye to the Holiday", and "Luna's Future" were storyboarded by Sabrina Alberghetti.

== Reception ==
The episode received acclaim. Daniel Avarez of Unleash the Fanboy highly praised the episode, giving it a perfect rating of 10 out of 10. He praised the "fantastic songs", the episode itself as "A solid Christmas tale", as it "takes the overused Christmas Carol plot but manages to be great anyway." He was also receptive of the use of songs to enhance the story rather than distract, as well as the story arc of Starlight's redemption. Don't Hate the Geek called the episode "amazing", describing Luna's appearance as the Spirit of Hearth's Warming Yet to Come and her song as show stealers.

Daniel Ingram was nominated for a 2017 Leo Award for his work on this episode for "Best Musical Score in an Animation Program or Series".

== Home media release ==
All songs in the episode (excluding "Hearth's Warming Eve is Here Once Again (Reprise)") were released as a part of the 2016 physical and digital re-release of the 2015 compilation album It's a Pony Kind of Christmas.

== See also ==
- Adaptations of A Christmas Carol
