= My Little Pony: Magic Princess =

2012 video game

- Developer: Gameloft
- Publisher: Gameloft
- Platforms: iOS/iPadOS; Android; Microsoft Windows; Windows Phone (discontinued), PC from the Facebook website (discontinued)
- Release: WW: November 8, 2012
- Genre: City-building
- Mode: Single-player with multiplayer interaction

My Little Pony: Magic Princess, known as My Little Pony: Friendship Is Magic from release until shortly after, and My Little Pony until some time between April and September 2017, is a 2012 video game developed and published by Gameloft for iOS/iPadOS and Android and based on the animated television series My Little Pony: Friendship Is Magic. Targeting children aged 5 to 12, it was released on November 8.

The game starts with Twilight Sparkle asking the player to help her rebuild her hometown of Ponyville after it had fallen into the shadow of the villainous Nightmare Moon. To do so, the player uses in-game currency and other collected treasures to build homes to bring more ponies to the town, as well as to build buildings that are either decorative or generate more currency and treasures. Mini-games can be used to build the skill level of each pony, which in turn lets said pony give more rewards in certain minigames. Though primarily played as a single-player game, players can visit their friends' versions of Ponyville, and also leave and accept gifts to help their own village. Certain minigames also utilise the friends-list to get percentage bonuses on rewards. This game is guided by a quest and experience system. While Gameloft had developed the game towards the show's target audience of young girls, they also include nods to the adult fandom of the show.

Despite being generally well-received, the game was criticized as exemplifying the underlying nature of freemium games where either the player must spend real money, feed their pony or wait for a very long period of time in order to join the game.

== Gameplay ==
My Little Pony: Magic Princess's story starts after Princess Luna as the villainous Nightmare Moon casts a dark shadow over Ponyville, which in turn made all the town's inhabitants escape. Twilight Sparkle and her assistant Spike want to find a way to reconstruct Ponyville, particularly bring back the other bearers of the Elements of Harmony - Applejack, Fluttershy, Pinkie Pie, Rainbow Dash and Rarity - to help defeat Nightmare Moon and bring back Princess Luna.

To do so, the player must construct homes for the characters through purchasing them from the game's shop. There are three different building types in the game, decorative buildings that do not serve any function, houses which are buildings that the characters live in, and businesses which generate income. Each business takes a fixed amount of time to generate its product, which then can be collected by the player. This can award the player "bits" (in-game currency), experience points, and other treasures used for purchasing items later in the game; these can include shards representing the Elements of Harmony, which are necessary to draw in Twilight Sparkle's five friends (Rainbow Dash, Pinkie Pie, Fluttershy, Rarity, and Applejack) and are used to defeat Nightmare Moon among other in-game activities. Businesses generate different amounts of income depending on how much the building cost to build as well as the production time. Each pony character has a zero- to five-star rating, which represents a skill level. The skill level of each pony can be increased by participating in a mini-game with the pony, such as catching falling apples or bouncing a ball continuously. Every play costs either bits or gems, depending on how big of a score multiplier the player wishes to obtain.

The gameplay is driven by quests, which direct the player to build different buildings to attract specific ponies to Ponyville, or to perform other activities, such as clearing away shadow-covered land to expand buildable space, clear away debris, earn rewards or add decorative objects in the town. The player can edit the placement of buildings and decorations to their liking once purchased. Certain quests require the purchase of "premium items", in-game items that cost Gems, the game's premium currency. Gems may be purchased or rarely obtained from in-game activities. Using either Gameloft's or Facebook integration, the player can visit their friends' Ponyville (as well as Twilight Sparkle's, a default friend available to everyone) and leave gifts in the form of crystal hearts, a secondary currency used to purchase certain ponies which can not be obtained outside of receiving them from friends and, rarely, as event rewards.

Though most ponies and buildings can be bought using bits, some require the use of gems or crystal hearts. Furthermore, activities like constructing a new building, and the production of bits in a building, can be hurried by expending gems, with the gem cost increasing depending on how much time is skipped. Gems and bits can be purchased with real money through the in-game shop.

An additional minigame centered around My Little Pony: Equestria Girls based on Konami's Dance Dance Revolution and Just Dance series gameplay is also available. Players can use their fingers to tap on the screen to the beat of the music. The songs featured in the game are taken from the Equestria Girls movie, and award the player based on scoring. Once a song has been played, the player is forced to wait before they can play it again.

The game has been updated multiple times with new content and time-limited events tying in to the show, as well as the numerous movies released during its run. These updates added a number of new ponies, buildings, decorations, as well as new areas to explore and build in, as well as time-limited minigames.

== Development ==
Hasbro and Gameloft had announced a licensing partnership in June 2012, which allowed the latter to develop games that were based on Hasbro's properties; this announcement was revealed that one of the first games was one that was based on My Little Pony: Friendship Is Magic, for most mobile devices, to eventually arrive before the end of 2012.

== Reception ==
Michelle Starr of CNET Australia was critical of the game's freemium nature: in order to progress in the quests, the player must purchase certain characters, some which may require gems to purchase or sell. While the player continues to earn experience, gain levels, earn rewards and earn gems in any other way without needing to pay any additional money, the time to collect enough gems can be extremely long; Starr Welton had estimated that one player would have to play for at least 3 years to be able to earn enough gems to be able to obtain the last required character, or otherwise they can spend around US$30 to buy them outright. Starr Welton had surmised that the mechanics will either have the player to put excessive money into the game, or otherwise they will have to give it up when they cannot easily progress any further. Similarly, Harley Ogier for Stuff.co.nz criticized the game's original pricing scheme, acknowledging either the monetary or the lengthy time investment that was needed simply to collect gems and the main story, and that this type of monetization is both insulting to adult players and frustrating to young children unaware of why they cannot play or finish the game. Peter Wellington of Pocket Gamer also lamented that the pace of the game in terms of obtaining bits and other treasures to expand is very slow, and, even though the primary source of bits are mostly the minigames, this can make the game feel very boring for very little reward even after they have played about a week.

In response to the cost complaints, Gameloft also issued a change in the pricing which was within the in-game store in early December 2012, specifically by reducing the cost of ponies that required gems by a very large amount; for example, Rainbow Dash, one of the main ponies which is needed to complete the game's story mode, was lowered from 500 gems to 90 gems. The price has still been considered high, either after requiring the user to wait for several months to collect a dozen of gems or to pay real money to buy the gems itself, putting into question the "freemium" model that most companies like Gameloft were using. Gameloft, in response to the complaints after the gem cost reduction, believed that there were most of these that were from the older fans of the show who would rather complete the game excessively and quickly, instead of having had their intended audience of younger girls; Lewis Digby of Gameloft stated that most games are meant to be free of access, and that "we need to sell more in-game content if we want to be profitable". As of March 2013, it has been downloaded more than 5.4 million times. By 2016, that number had increased to 40 million.
