= Slice of Life (My Little Pony: Friendship Is Magic) =

- My Little Pony: Friendship Is Magic episode
- Equestrians from near and far at Cranky and Matilda's wedding ceremony.
- Episode no.: Season 5 Episode 9
- Directed by: Jim Miller
- Written by: M.A. Larson
- Editing by: M.A. Larson (story); Rachel Kenzie (animatic)
- Original air date: June 13, 2015
- Running time: 22 minutes

Episode chronology
← Previous "The Lost Treasure of Griffonstone"	Next → "Princess Spike"
- My Little Pony: Friendship Is Magic (season 5) #Episodes

"Slice of Life" is the ninth episode of the fifth season of the animated television series My Little Pony: Friendship Is Magic as well as the 100th episode of the series overall, which was celebrated as a milestone episode by Hasbro and its affiliates. It was directed by Jim Miller, written by M.A. Larson and produced by Devon Cody. The episode aired on June 13, 2015 on Discovery Family.

In the episode, Ponyville's citizens rush to prepare for a wedding between donkey couple Cranky Doodle and Matilda while the Mane Six and intended wedding organizers—Twilight Sparkle, Applejack, Fluttershy, Pinkie Pie, Rainbow Dash and Rarity—are busy defending the town against a monster attack. The episode heavily features background and minor characters popularized by the show's adult fanbase, and was created to pay tribute to the fandom, whom Hasbro and the show's crew credited for the series' success.

== Plot ==
On the day before their wedding, the betrothed donkey couple Cranky Doodle and Matilda discover that the event has been misdated to that day on their invitations, which have already been delivered across Ponyville by Muffins. The couple's wedding planner Pinkie Pie is found busy fending off an attacking bugbear (a part-bear, part-bee monster) alongside her friends Twilight Sparkle, Applejack, Fluttershy, Rainbow Dash and Rarity. With the six mares occupied, the other citizens are left to prepare the wedding themselves, each caught in their own circumstances along the way:

- Muffins consults Dr. Hooves for a solution to her mistake, but he is preoccupied with getting his suit tailored for the wedding. DJ Pon-3 directs Hooves to a bowling alley, where he is sidetracked into joining Jeff Letrotski's team in exchange for their tailoring skills. Muffins interrupts the game to borrow Hooves' fireworks as flower arrangements. This causes the team to lose, and Hooves is left to wear an overly long scarf instead.
- Lyra Heartstrings and Bon Bon help with the wedding decorations. Upon learning of the bugbear attack, Bon Bon confesses her double life as a secret agent named Sweetie Drops, whom the monster has a vendetta against. Lyra is hurt by her friend's deception, but later makes amends with her by divulging her own "deepest, darkest secret" that she once ate an expensive meal Bon Bon had planned to prepare without permission.
- Matilda befriends Cranky's groomsman, Steven Magnet the sea serpent, while styling her mane at the spa. Later, when Cranky loses his wig during the rush, Steven fashions him a replacement made from his own mustache.
- The musicians DJ Pon-3 and Octavia Melody work out the wedding music in a last-minute jam session. They then rush to the reception on a mobile DJ booth, picking up every citizen in their path before they crash into town hall, where everyone and everything neatly falls into place for the ceremony, all while Pinkie Pie's pet alligator Gummy observes in the midst of an existentialist internal monologue.

The wedding proceeds without Twilight and her friends, whom Muffins accidentally locks out as they return from their victory against the bugbear. Mayor Mare presides over the wedding, honoring all the citizens who have played both big and small roles in enriching the couple's lives. Cranky and Matilda kiss, causing Hooves' fireworks to ignite in a vibrant display as a reaction to their love. As they watch the ceremony from outside, the episode ends with Twilight joyously embracing her friends and telling them how lucky they are to live in Ponyville.

== Production ==
According to Tom Cosgrove, the General Manager of Discovery Family, a series reaching 100 episodes is considered a "tremendous accomplishment". Friendship Is Magic was not expected to reach this mark when the show started back in October 2010, according to Hasbro Studios executive director Brian Lenard, who had worked on the show from its inception. Lenard attributed the show's success in part to the reaction of the older fanbase of bronies, which allowed the show to grow organically with the interest of fans on other characters besides the main characters; director Jim Miller similarly described the episode as a "love letter" to the fans for this reason. According to the episode's writer, M.A. Larson, Hasbro proposed using the 100th episode to focus on background ponies, an idea which Miller initially argued against. Writer Amy Keating Rogers was originally assigned to write the episode's screenplay, but due to scheduling issues, she exchanged episodes with Larson to write the previous episode "The Lost Treasure of Griffonstone".

The episode was first publicly discussed on a My Little Pony panel at the 2014 San Diego Comic-Con, where the crew mentioned the episode's focus on background and minor characters popularized by the show's fandom. Meghan McCarthy said in a Q&A session at Australia's 2015 PonyCon that the episode would not focus on the main characters, and that some featured characters' personalities would be based on fan interpretations, including "Doctor Whooves", whose name fans coined for his purported likeness to David Tennant's portrayal of the Doctor from the British television series Doctor Who.

According to episode writer M.A. Larson, two working titles for the episode were "A Tour of Ponyville" and "A Tour of Equestria", and the episode originally featured Twilight Sparkle in a more prominent role prior to his involvement. In Larson's initial drafts, the episode also featured several other supporting characters, including Flash Sentry, Coco Pommel, and the royal guards, whose scenes had been cut for time.

Phil Caesar and Krista Huot designed the inside of Doctor Hooves' house. The music that played in DJ Pon-3's headphones was arranged from DJ Snake and Lil Jon's "Turn Down for What". Kora Kosicka designed the bugbear. Rebecca Dart and Phil Caesar designed DJ Pon-3 and Octavia Melody's house. Electric cellist Tina Guo performed Octavia's cello part during the episode's final sequence.

During the episode, there is a split-second appearance of a group of people wearing horse head masks; they are storyboard supervisor Timothy Packford (black horse mask), director Jim Miller (brown horse), storyboard artist Katrina Hadley (pink horse), Friendship Is Magic supervising director Jayson Thiessen (white unicorn), and Rainbow Rocks co-director Ishi Rudell (zebra).

== Broadcast and reception ==
"Slice of Life" aired on Discovery Family on June 13, 2015. The milestone episode was viewed by 431,000 viewers. According to the Nielsen household ratings, it was watched by approximately 0.22 percent of American households.

Prior to the episode's release, Ella Anders of BSCKids, who praised the series' supporting and background cast, called the episode's premise "a great way to celebrate [the series' one-hundredth episode]". She also commented on the previews and fans' anticipation of the episode, saying that they "prove that Friendship is Magic is only growing stronger and gaining more popularity as season five marches on." Daniel Alvarez of Unleash the Fanboy gave the episode a perfect 10 out of 10 rating, calling it "one of the most heart-warming adventures" and "would have actually nicely served as a fine final episode to the series." Alvarez further commented by praising the entire episode overall. Brian McNatt of This Is Infamous was more critical of the episode's references to the show's adult fanbase, saying, "As fun as it is for the members of the fandom it's aimed at, the bronies and their like, this episode must be hecka weird to the actual target audience of the show." Despite this, he considered the episode "a great experience", praising the episode's voice work and the musical duet between characters Octavia and "Vinyl Scratch" (DJ Pon-3).

Sherilyn Connelly, the author of Ponyville Confidential, panned the episode, giving it an "F" rating, and wrote "To quote Miss Cheerilee in My Little Pony: Equestria Girls: 'No. Just, no.'" She wrote that the episode was "not good", and that while the focus on the background characters was a "solid concept", she wrote that "Slice of Life" did not feel like an episode of Friendship Is Magic. Connelly lamented that the end result felt like fan fiction, and as someone who disliked fan fiction, found the episode "well-nigh unwatchable".

== Home media release ==
"Slice of Life" was released on the My Little Pony: Friendship is Magic - Friends Across Equestria DVD, along with "Make New Friends but Keep Discord" (Season 5, Episode 7), "Amending Fences" (Season 5, Episode 12), "Made in Manehattan" (Season 5, Episode 16) and "The Mane Attraction" (Season 5, Episode 24), on March 1, 2016. It was also released as part of the complete Season 5 DVD set.
