= International availability of McDonald's products =

Evolving state of product availability

McDonald's Corporation (NYSE: MCD) is the world's largest chain of fast food restaurants, serving around 68 million customers daily in 119 countries. McDonald's traces its origins to a 1940 restaurant in San Bernardino, California, United States. After expanding within the United States, McDonald's became an international corporation in 1967, when it opened a location in Richmond, British Columbia, Canada. By the end of the 1970s, McDonald's restaurants existed in five of the Earth's seven continents; an African location came in 1992 in Casablanca, Morocco.

In order to cater to local tastes and culinary traditions, and often in respect of particular laws or religious beliefs, McDonald's offers regionalized versions of its menu among and within different countries. As a result, products found in one country or region may not be found in McDonald's restaurants in other countries or their ingredients may differ significantly. For example, Indian McDonald's does not serve beef/pork products.

== Africa ==
=== Egypt ===
In 2001, McDonald's introduced the McFalafel sandwich in its Egypt locations. These restaurants also offer a Chicken Big Mac and Fish Mac, variations on the standard Big Mac which substitute breaded chicken or fish, respectively, for the usual beef patties. In the summer of 2008, McDonald's introduced fish fingers with tartar dipping sauce as a side in Egyptian restaurants. Early 2010 saw the introduction of Egyptian cookies to the Cairo location. McDonald's has almost 70 locations throughout the country.

=== Morocco ===
The McArabia, a grilled chicken sandwich from Morocco. In 2005, a product called the McSahara was briefly sold. In late 2006, the Chicken Mythic, Petit Plaisirs ("small pleasures," a sandwich usually made from chicken or beef), and a 280-gram Recette Moutarde ("mustard burger") were released. During the Islamic holy month of Ramadan, a special menu is offered for the breaking of the fast, including local specialties such as dates, milk, and harira.

=== South Africa ===
McDonald's outlets in South Africa are operated by local franchisor McDonald's South Africa.

Some of the items listed at a location in Cape Town include:

- McFizz (flavours include watermelon and passionfruit), a drink inspired by Sprite
- Chocolate Caramel McFlurry, a McFlurry ice cream sundae with chocolate and caramel sauce
- McFeast, a burger made of onions, cheese, beef, lettuce, McBraai sauce and McChicken sauce
- Boerie Burger, a burger with the meat as boerewors
- BBQ Double Burger, a hamburger with McBraai sauce
- Chicken Foldover, a slider made of tortillas (spicy option available)
- Grand Chicken, a chicken burger with the options of hot spicy, garlic mayo, jalapeño and McChicken
- Jalapeño Chicken, a spicy chicken burger made with jalapeño chilli (jalapeño pepper)
- Jalapeño Chicken Double, a larger Jalapeño Chicken burger
- Spicy Cajun Chicken Deluxe, a spicy chicken burger
- SA Breakfast, a brekkie (breakfast) meal made of boerewors patties, onions, eggs, tomato, a bun and hot chips (fries)

Others include:

- Jalapeño Dipping Sauce
- Mega Muffin, a Sausage McMuffin but larger
- Corn Cup, a healthy alternative side, a cup of corn

== Asia ==
=== Bahrain ===
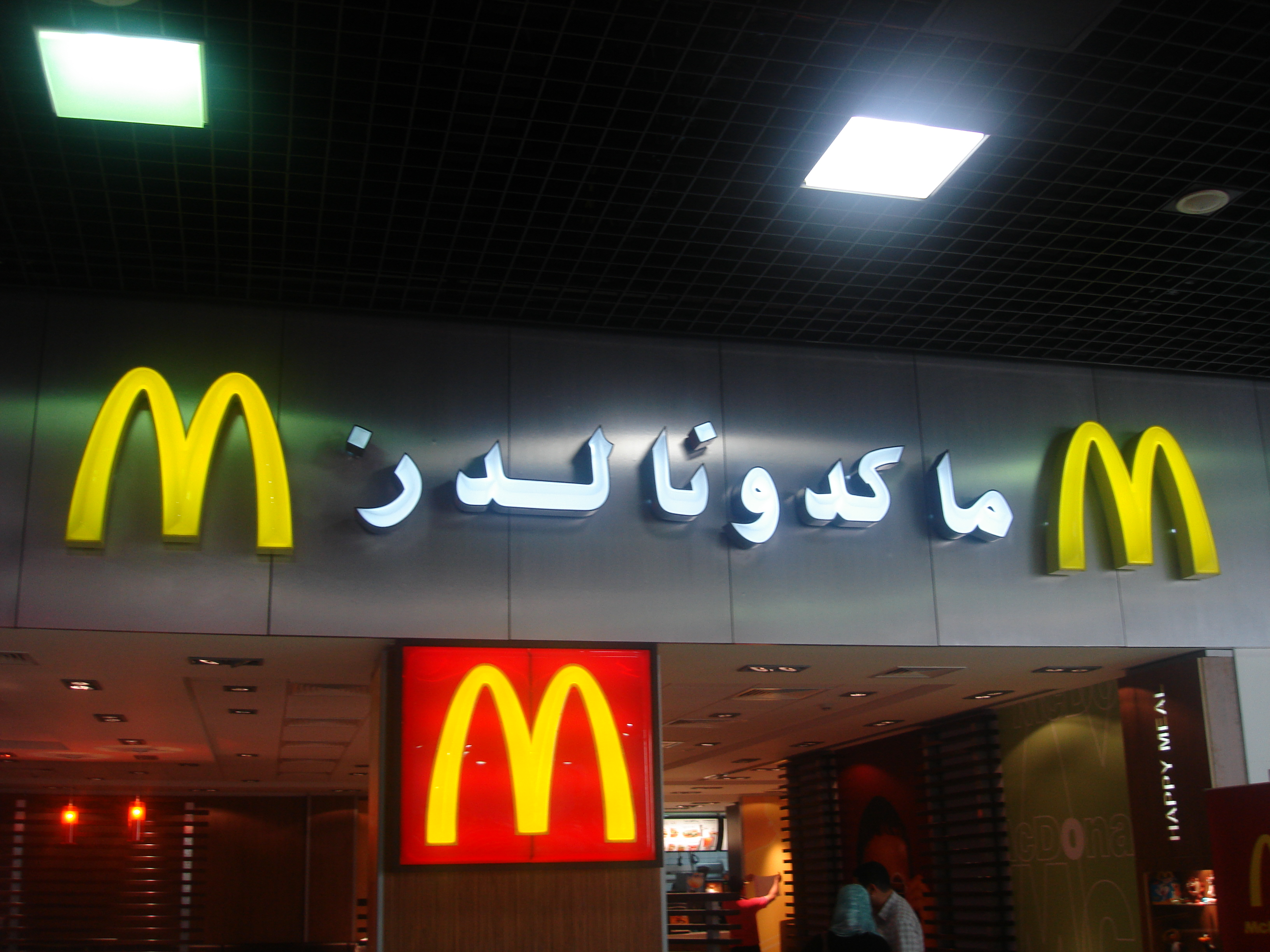
McDonald's in Bahrain International Airport

As in all McDonald's locations in the Islamic Middle East, food in Bahraini locations is halal. In addition to the McArabia, Bahraini locations offer, beginning in March 2009, the McCrispy, a meal consisting of up to four chicken fingers with a choice of barbecue, ketchup, sweet and sour, or garlic sauce.

=== China ===
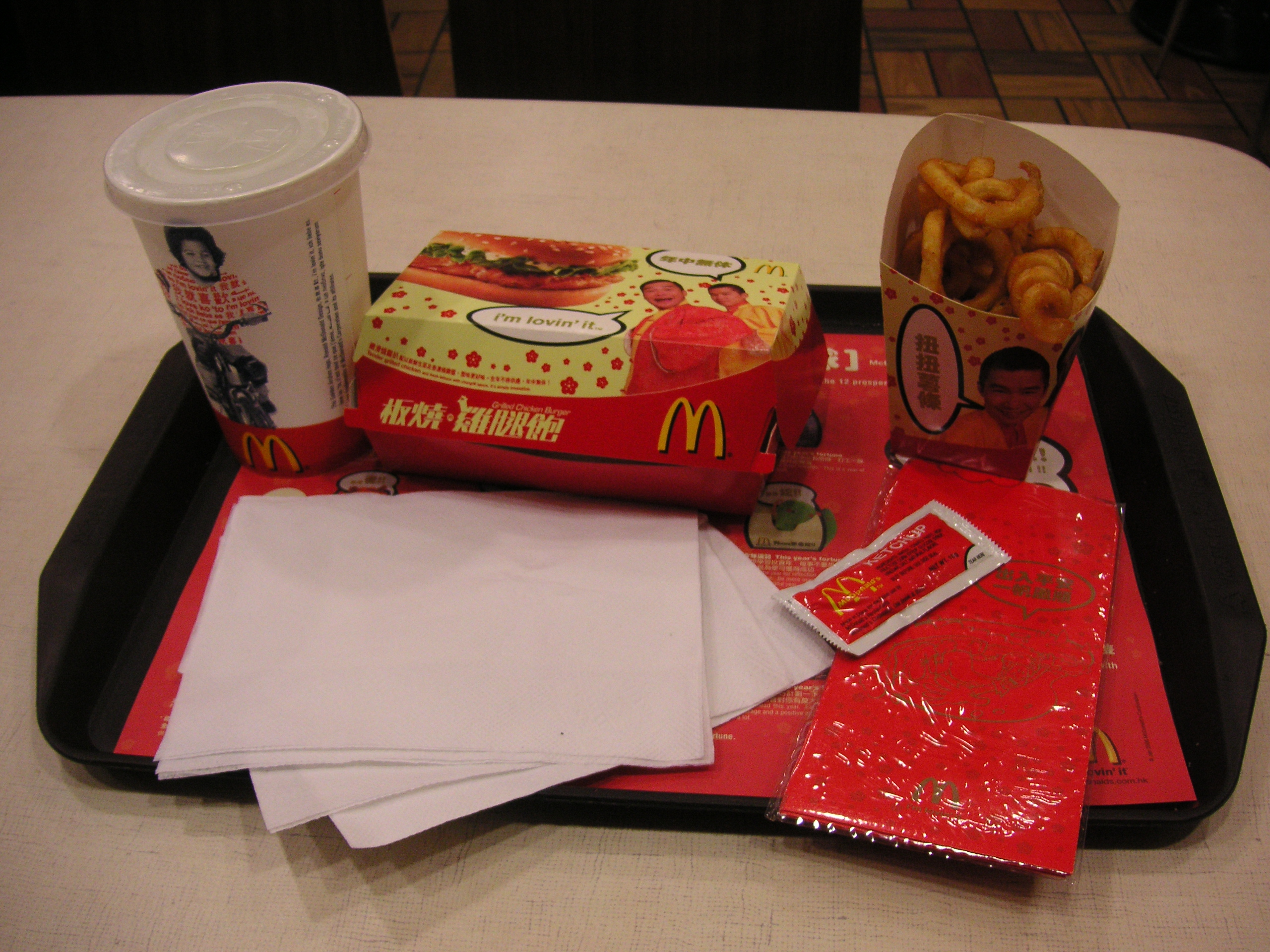
McDonald's Chinese New Year meal, grilled chicken sandwich and twisted French fries. Tray liner has an image of the Chinese zodiac.

In China, Chicken McNuggets can come with the traditional barbecue, sweet and sour, honey and hot mustard sauces; or even a special chili garlic sauce, which is popular in China. Chinese menus also include crispy spicy chicken wings, called McWings. All chicken burgers offered in Chinese McDonald's use thigh fillet (e.g., Premium Grilled Thigh Fillet Burger, Hot and Spicy Grilled Thigh Fillet Burger), rather than breast meat, which is preferred in western countries.

Unique ice cream flavours such as Matcha Green Tea ice cream is available. Pies come in two standard flavours: pineapple or taro, although special flavours including chocolate, apple, banana, and azuki bean have also been offered on a limited basis.

There is a seasonal Chinese New Year meal available, including the Grilled Chicken Burger and curly fries, with a horoscope of the twelve zodiac animals of Chinese astrology and traditional red envelopes.

=== Hong Kong ===
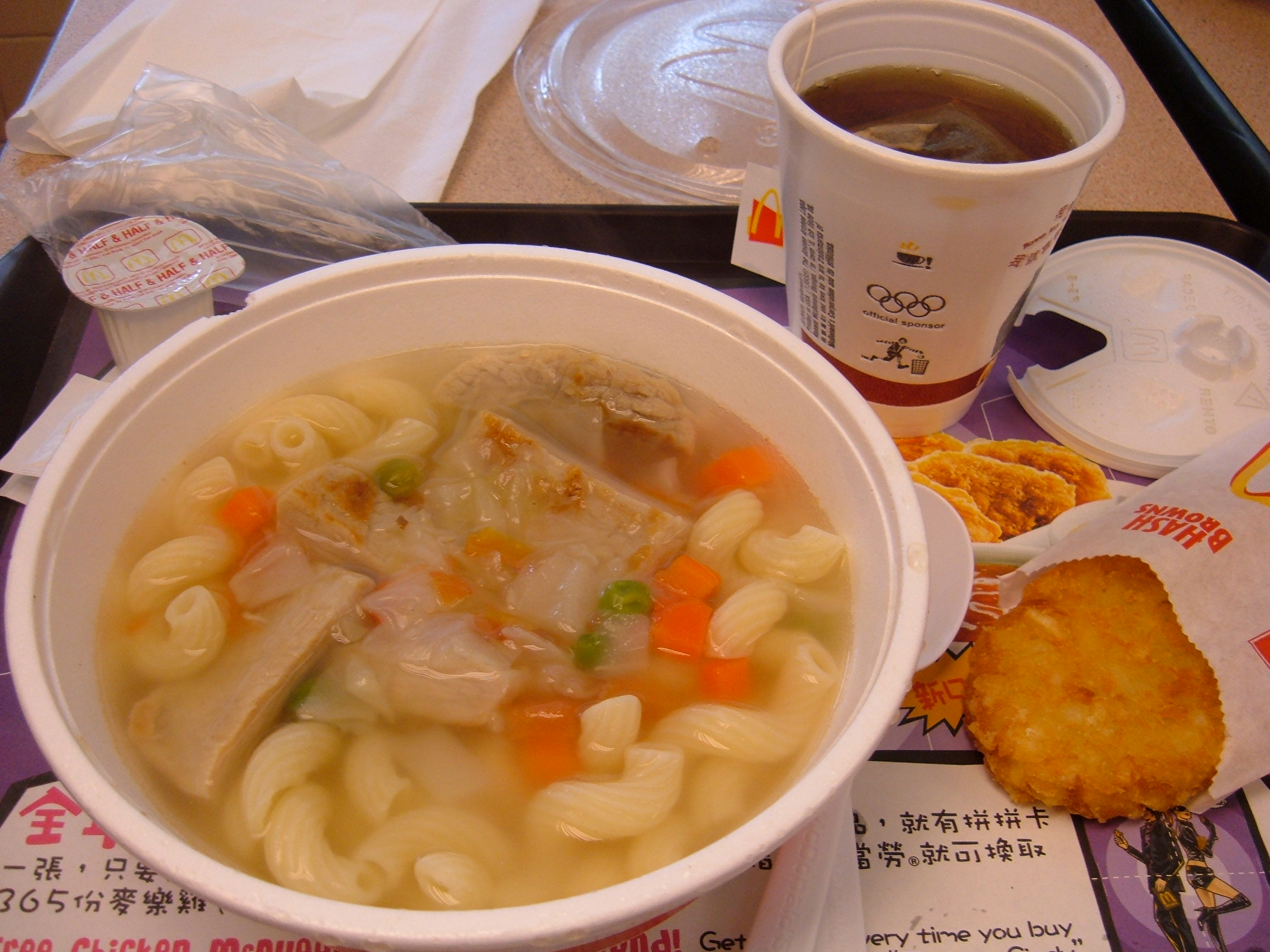
Breakfast noodles

Hong Kong hosts some of the world's busiest McDonald's, with many operating 24 hours a day. Breakfasts include pasta soups with sausage or chicken. Locations offer cups of corn as substitutes for French fries or à la carte. Desserts include soft serve ice cream in azuki bean and mung bean flavours; pineapple or red bean sundaes are sometimes offered.

A selection of seasonal or other limited-time foods is available, such as spicy French fries, the Shogun Burger (a teriyaki pork patty with lettuce served on a sesame seed bun), salads, soups such as tomato and pumpkin, taco flatbreads, the Rice Fantastic (a burger-like entree with rice patties instead of buns). Other such specialities have included shrimp burgers, Wasabi Filet O' Fish, onion rings, and Shake Shake fries, flavoured French fries in flavours such as seaweed, chargrill, French onion, and salt and pepper. During the local Bun Festival, restaurants on the island of Cheung Chau sell mushroom burgers instead of hamburgers and other meat products.

Toys, gifts, and other non-food promotional items are offered from time to time.

=== India ===
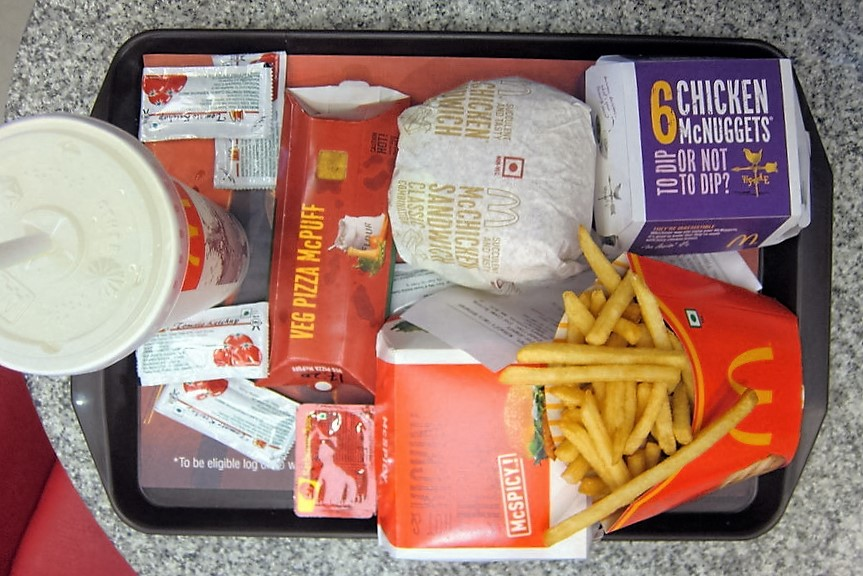
McSpicy Chicken, McChicken, Pizza McPuff, Chicken McNuggets and French fries sold by McDonald's in India

Indian McDonalds serve the Chicken Maharaja Mac, a grilled chicken double patty with habanero sauce and Veg Maharaja Mac, a cheese and corn double patty with cocktail sauce. Apart from these, the McSpicy burgers/wraps, McGrill and Pizza McPuff are sold in India. Mc Aloo Tikki, Mc Veggie, Mc Chicken, Mc Egg, Filet-o-fish burger, chicken wraps, veg wraps, chicken kebab burger is very popular in India. Recent additions in India include rice bowls, biriyani and naan wraps.

Past promotional items have included the McPaneer and Grilled Chicken Royale, Mexican Spice Chicken and Veg, Asian Hot Garlic Dip and African Peri Peri Shake Shake (as part of the Spice Fest) Indi-McSpicy and the McCurry Pan.

McDonald's in India do not serve beef nor pork products, in deference to Hindu and Muslim beliefs respectively. Vegetarian and meat based meals are prepared in separate areas of the restaurant due to religious laws; cooks preparing vegetarian dishes wear a distinctive green apron and non vegetarian cooks wear a red apron.

=== Indonesia ===
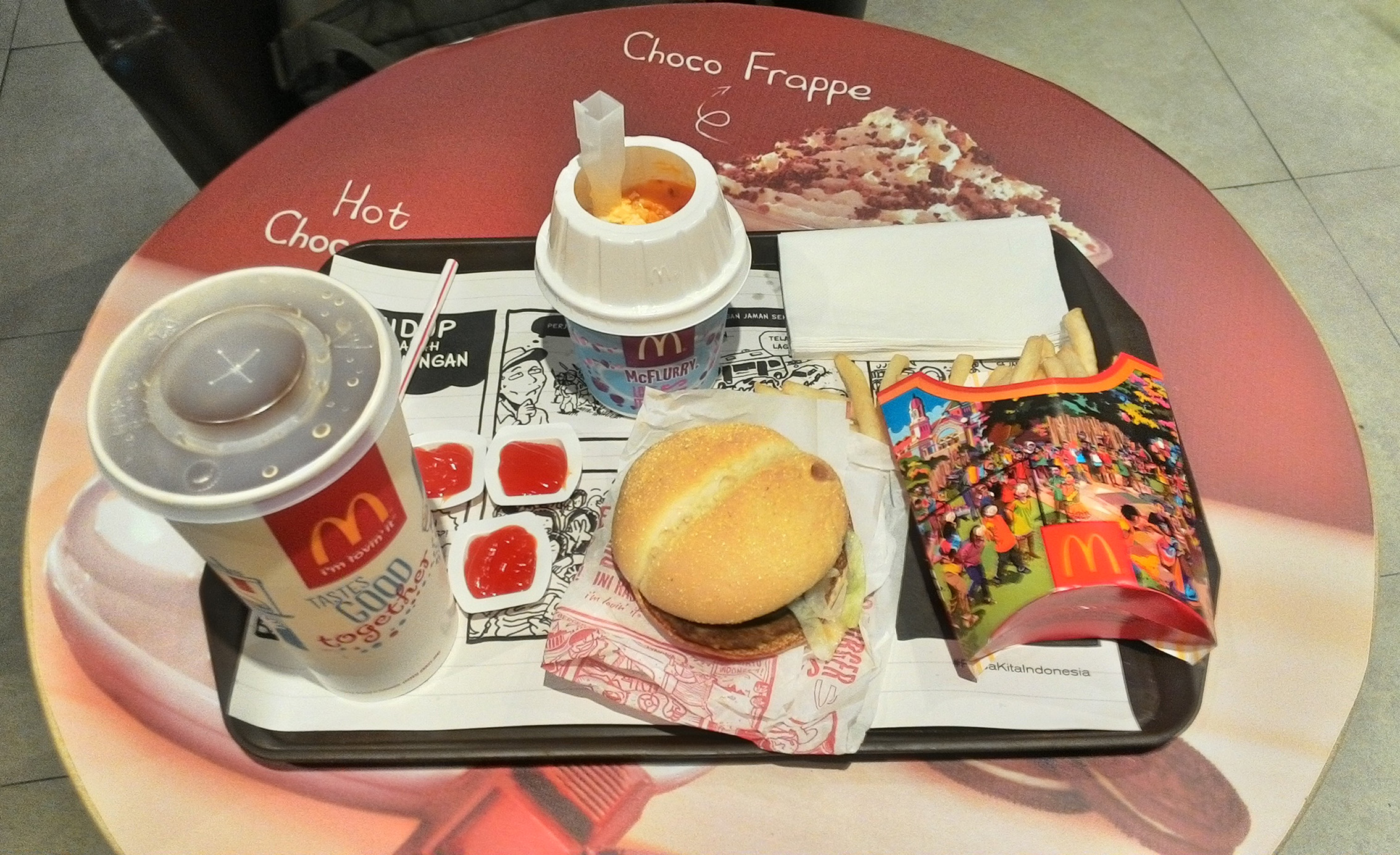
McDonald's Indonesia promo; Burger Sate, McFlurry Rujak Pedas, Markisa soda tea and Fries. Limited in August only, the month of Indonesian Independence, in 2016.

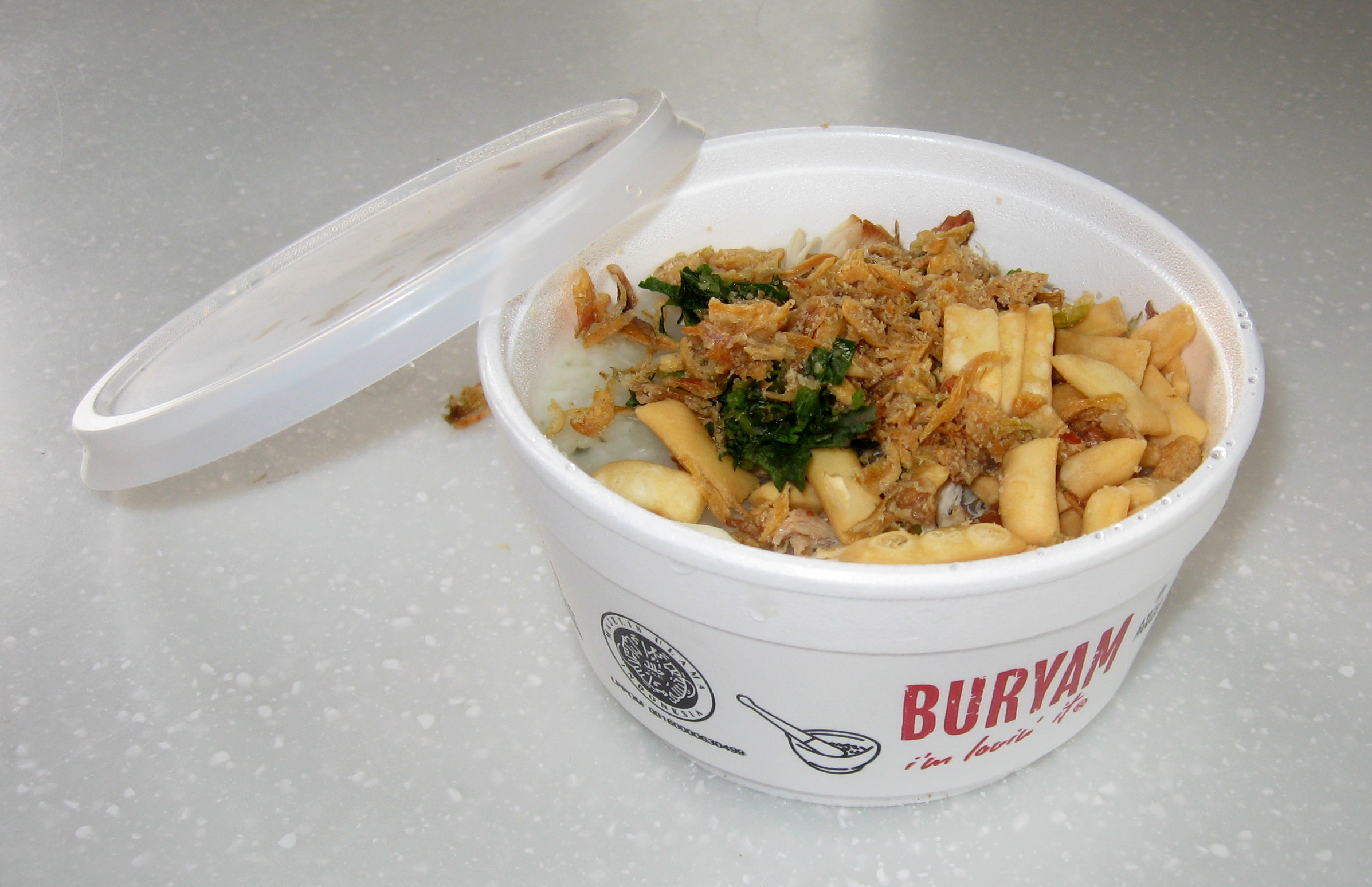
Bubur ayam (chicken congee)

To accommodate Muslim-majority population, all McDonald's restaurants in Indonesia are certified halal, which means they do not serve bacon or pork patties, while serving only beef, chicken, and fish. Local items include crispy and spicy fried chicken; the McRice, a small mound of steamed rice wrapped in paper and available to supersize; McSoup, a chicken flavored soup with bits of croutons and vegetables; and Buryam (short for bubur ayam or chicken congee), later renamed as Bubur Ayam Spesial with the addition of fried egg topping. Sambal chili sauce, an essential component of Indonesian cuisine, and tomato ketchup are available as condiments.

McDonald's fried chicken, McRice, and fruit tea are sold together as PaNas (paket nasi or "rice package") with an additional sachet of sambal chili sauce. This adopts the Indonesian way of consuming ayam goreng (fried chicken) with steamed rice and sambal.

Other than fried chicken with rice and bubur ayam chicken rice congee, locals' preference of rice-based food is accommodated further by the introduction of Chicken with Spicy Tomato and Chicken Teriyaki, which is a bowl of steamed rice topped with strips of fried chicken patty with sauces and vegetables, similar to the Japanese donburi (rice bowl) fashion of serving.

McDonald's Indonesia also promotes some seasonal foods, sold only within a limited certain period of time. Those limited periods include Chinese New Year, Ramadhan, and Independence Day specials.

During Chinese New Year, a Beef Prosperity Burger, consisting of two beef patties covered in black pepper sauce and topped with diced onions, is sold.

During Ramadan, McDonald's Indonesia has offered BBQ Beef Flatbread (2014), Curry Beef Delight (2015), Moroccan Burger (2016), Ayam Kremes (2017 and 2018, with addition of Nasi Uduk), Ayam Serundeng Sambal Terasi (2019), Ayam Spesial Sambal Bawang (2020), and Ayam Gulai (2021).

In certain periods, such as August (the month of Indonesian independence), McDonald's Indonesia launches local-inspired dishes, which change annually. For example, in 2016, McDonald's offered Burger Sate, McFlurry Rujak Pedas, and Markisa soda tea. In 2020, dishes such as the Burger Nasi Goreng, a hamburger with sweet and savoury sauce, Kentang Goreng Gulai Gurih (gulai flavoured french fries) with Soda Asam Jawa (tamarind soda) and Es Kopi Durian Jelly Float (durian flavour ice coffee) were released. Locally inspired desserts include McFlurry with Teh botol and Cone Top Es Teler (Es teler flavour ice cream).

=== Israel ===
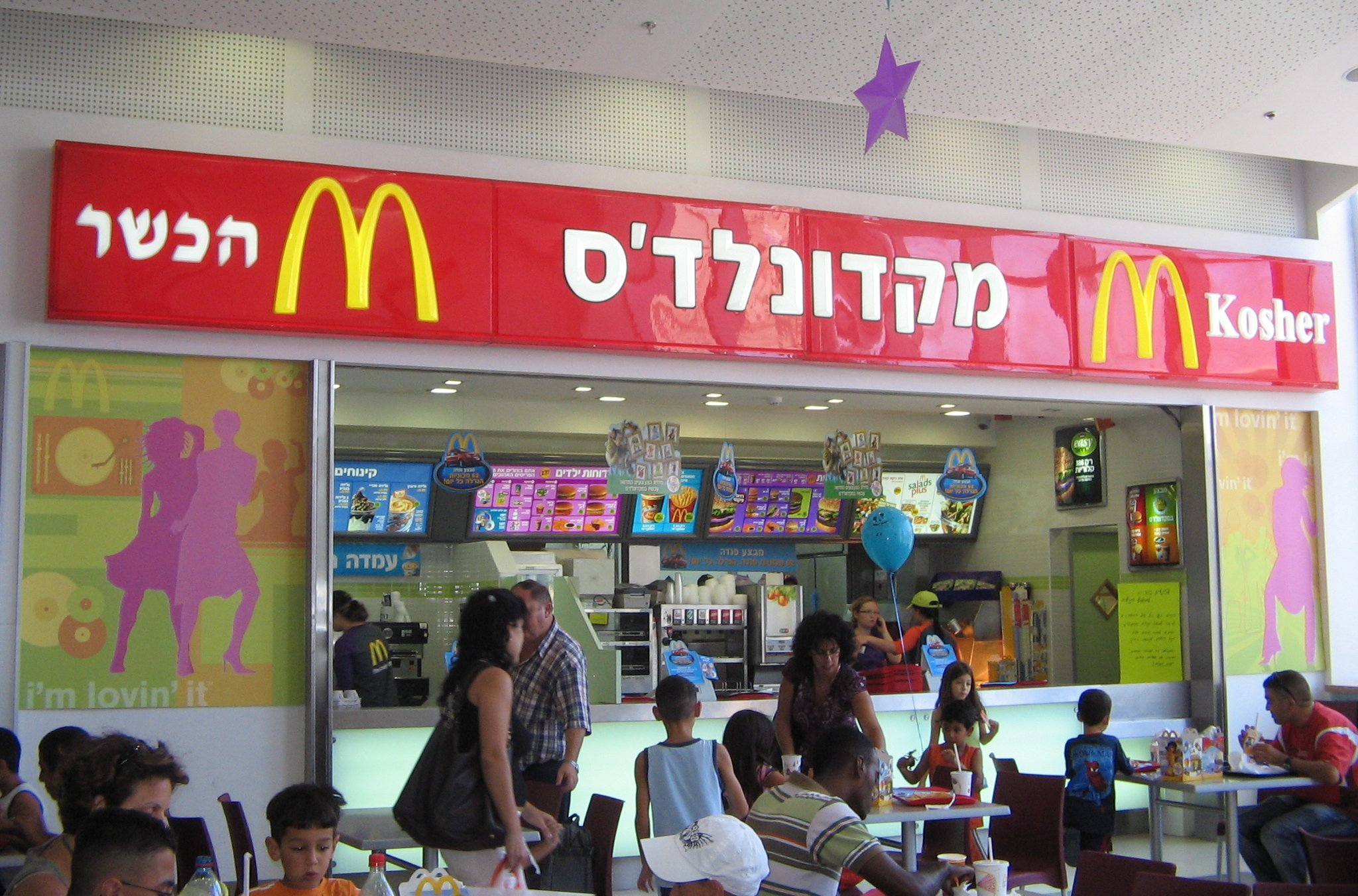
Kosher McDonald's

The only entirely kosher McDonald's are in Israel and Argentina. In these locations, patties are barbecued on charcoal rather than fried. Some kosher locations serve milk-based desserts, but in separate booths, allowing for full separation of dairy and meat products in food preparation areas. However, most of the McDonald's outlets in Israel are not kosher service, as they serve cheeseburgers, which mix dairy and meat products.

Specialty items in Israeli McDonald's include the McShawarma and McKebab, both served on flatbread. On January 18, 2011, McDonald's introduced the McFalafel sandwich in Israel, but withdrew the item six months later. Within the last few years they have added a vegetarian option, corn sticks (which are bite-sized corn schnitzels).

=== Japan ===
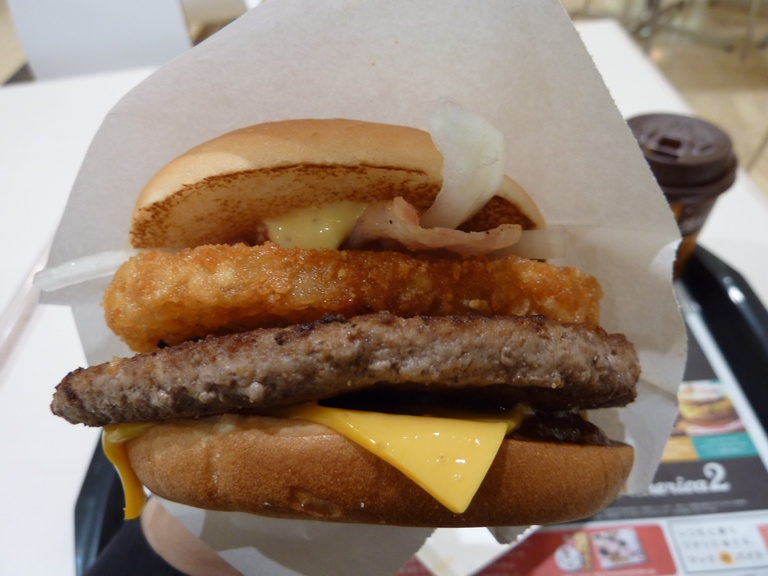
Idaho burgers include bacon, beef, onion, cheese and pepper sauce.

Regular menu items in Japanese McDonald's include the Teriyaki McBurger, with ground pork patties, mayonnaise, lettuce, and teriyaki sauce; Shaka Shaka Chicken, a fried chicken strip served in a paper pouch, with cheese or pepper seasonings to shake in the bag; and the Fillet-O-Ebi (shrimp), with a fried shrimp patty and mustard. Breakfast options include a hot dog with pickle relish, ketchup, and mustard, then for lunch and dinner they serve the Chilli McHotdog with egg and chilli sauce. As well as regular soft drinks (which in Japan include grape & melon flavoured Fanta and iced tea), McDonald's in Japan also serve cartons of milk, Minute Maid orange juice, oolong tea, and Yasai Seikatsu mixed vegetable juice.

Seasonal and limited-time items have included:

- The Chicken Katsu Burger, a breaded chicken sandwich flavored with soy sauce and ginger.
- The Gratin Korokke Burger, a sandwich with korokke (breaded mashed potatoes) filled with shrimp, macaroni, shredded cabbage, and katsu sauce, and optional cheese; served during winter

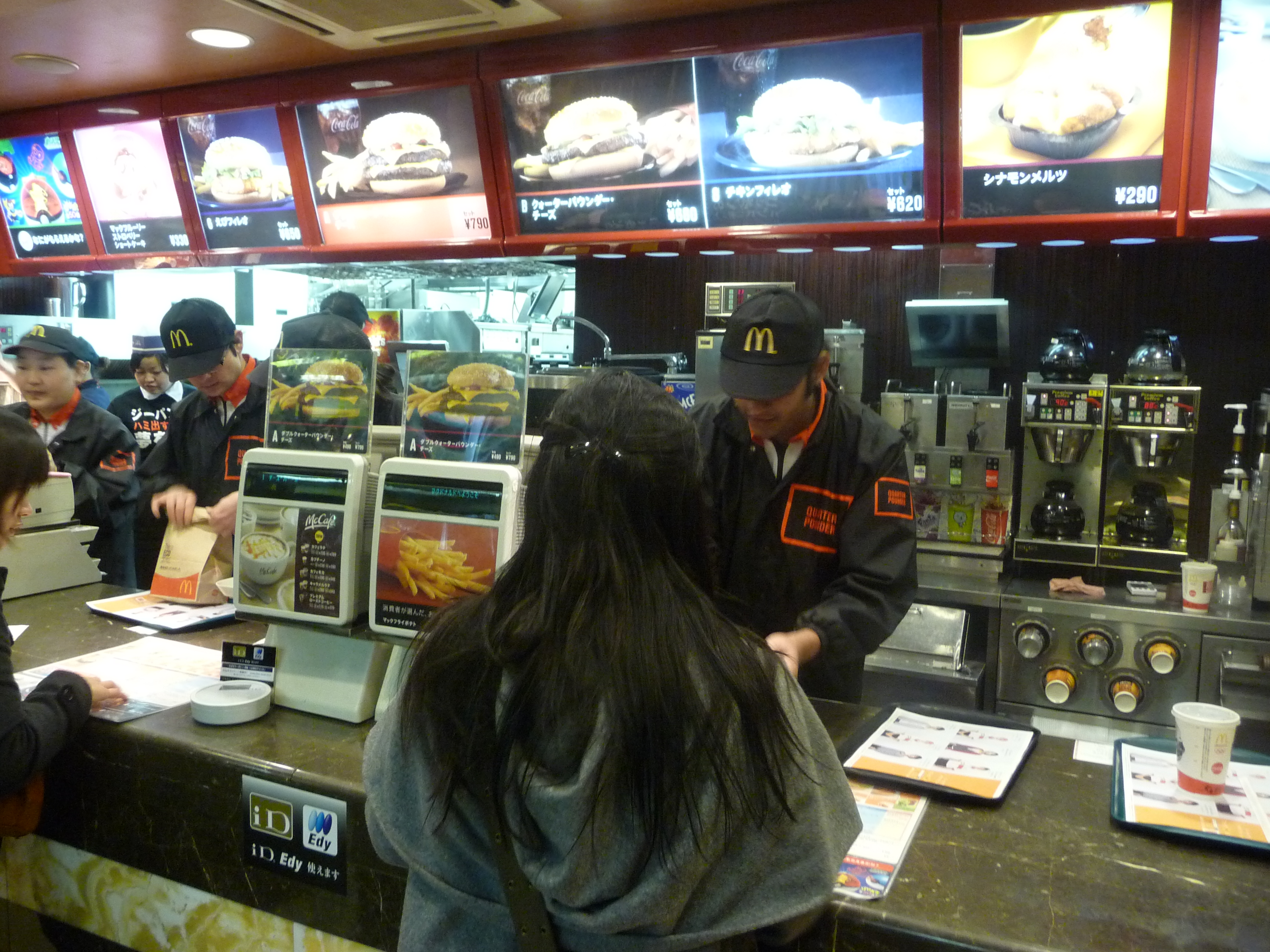
McDonald's counter in Japan

- Green tea-flavoured milkshakes
- The Salsa Burger, a breaded chicken sandwich with salsa
- The Tamago Double Mac, a hamburger with three beef patties, pepper sauce, bacon, a poached egg, and optional cheese
- The Teri Tama Burger, a teriyaki burger with egg; served during spring
- The Tamago Double Mac, a burger with egg, two beef patties, and bacon
- The Tsukimi Burger ("moon-viewing burger"), a hamburger with one beef patty, fry sauce, bacon, a poached egg (representing the Moon), and optional cheese; served before and during Tsukimi season
- Ume Nuggets, Chicken McNuggets with sour ume (plum) sauce for dipping
- The Mega Teriyaki, a teriyaki-style Big Mac variant with two pork patties and teriyaki sauce
- "Quarter Pounder Jewelry" burgers: The 'Gold Ring' available on July 6, 2012, the 'Black Diamond' on July 13, 2013, and 'Ruby Spark' on July 20, 2013, only

Some other limited-edition burgers in Japan have been marketed based on different regions of America, such as Idaho burgers.

On United States military establishments in Japan (like the US Naval Base in Yokosuka and US Naval Base in Sasebo), both American and Japanese menus are sold, depending on availability.

=== Malaysia ===
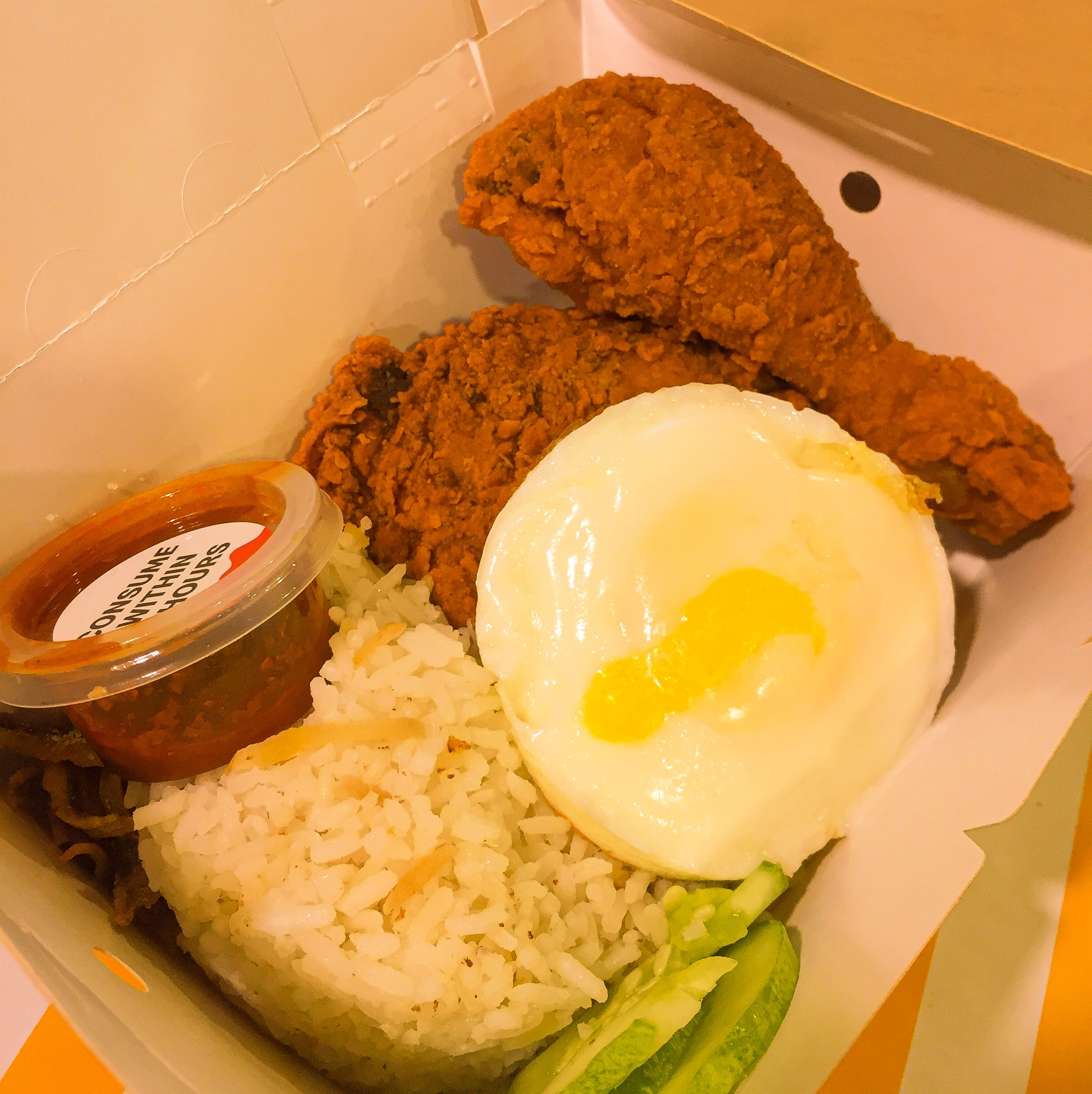
"Nasi Lemak McD", a Malaysianized McDonald's Menu. Nasi Lemak (coconut rice) served together with fried chicken, fried anchovies, cucumber slices, fried egg and Malay-styled sambal (chilli paste).

Correlating with most Muslim-majority markets, all McDonald's in Malaysia adhere to Islamic dietary laws (halal) under the supervision of the Department of Islamic Development Malaysia. Two Syarie experts are also appointed by the government to advise McDonald's on its food preparation. Thus, meat is slaughtered via the halal technique, while pork and bacon are absent in the Malaysian menu.

Among the local bestsellers in the Malaysian market is the Ayam Goreng McD, originally branded as McDonald's Fried Chicken, introduced in March 1986. The product's name was changed to Chicken McCrispy in 2000 and again to Ayam Goreng McD in 2002 to complement the country's culture. There are two variants of the fried chicken: Regular and Spicy. A third version of Fried Chicken – Extra Spicy Ayam Goreng – was periodically available from July to November 2019, November to December 2021 and August 2023.

The Malaysian McDonald's first approach on embracing the local tastebuds commenced in July 2002 by the debut of Bubur Ayam McD ("McD's Chicken Porridge"), chicken strips in rice congee with scallions, sliced ginger, fried shallots, and diced chilies; The success of Bubur Ayam McD has spread the porridge to be introduced into the regional McDonald's markets in Indonesia and Thailand. A close spin-off of the product, the Bubur Ikan McD ("McD's Fish Porridge") also led suit, albeit the latter was only served as a periodical offer.

Among other popular menu items distinct to the Malaysian market includes the Spicy Chicken McDeluxe, a burger with crispy marinated chicken thigh, lettuce and special sauce in a cornmeal bun; the GCB ("Grilled Chicken Burger"), grilled chicken thigh, with iceberg lettuce and chargrilled sauce, served in a toasted sesame seed bun; Nasi Lemak McD, coconut rice set served with traditional sambal sauce, fried chicken, cucumber slices and sunny side up egg; and iced Milo drink. Concurrently, some of the items that are commonly available in the international market has since being discontinued in the Malaysian outlet, including Big N' Tasty and Quarter Pounder.

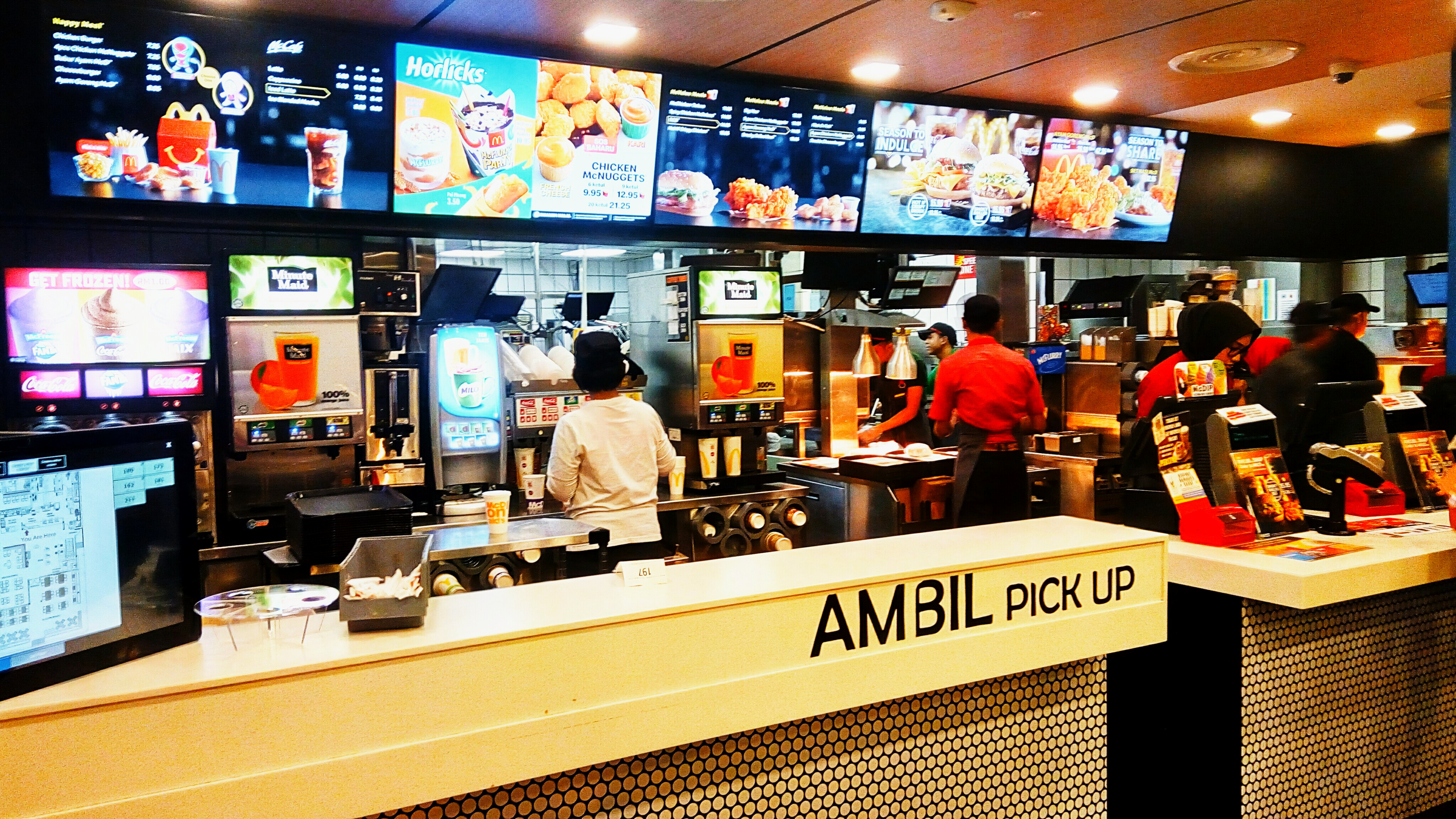
McDonald's counter in Shah Alam, Malaysia

Similar to McDonald's' business design worldwide, periodical and limited-time offers also generally included in the menu, specialties inspired from local, international and fusion menus have ushered the arrival of Nasi Lemak Burger, Thai Fish Burger with Green Curry Sauce, Hawaiian Deluxe Burger, Mexicana Chicken Burger, Burger Syok (A Malaysian-styled Burger), among few. Specialty desserts and drinks have included Hershey's Sundae, D24 Durian McFlurry Party, Cendol Sundae, Salted Caramel Pie, Banana Caramel Pie, Red Velvet McFlurry, Lychee Pie, Coconut Pie, Pulut Hitam (Black Glutinous Rice) Pie, Bandung drink and Pie à la Mode. Some of the temporary food-items also would later occasionally return on a periodical basis such in the case of Hot & Spicy McShaker Fries, Spicy Nuggets, Samurai (Japanese styled Burger), Spicy Korean Burger and Rio (Brazilian inspired Burger); while a few being absorbed to be a common Malaysian McDonald's fixture, as the case of GCB Burger, first available briefly in 2010, it later constitute as a permanent item since 2013.

McDonald's Malaysia has also introduced seasonal menus to commemorate major festivals and celebration in the multiracial country. Since 1994, McDonalds Malaysia launched Prosperity Burger during the Chinese New Year festival, the menu was then introduced to Brunei, Singapore, Indonesia, Taiwan and Hong Kong. The burger come in beef and chicken varieties, with black pepper sauce, topped with fresh onions in a sesame seed bun. Additionally, between 2015 and 2018, between 2021–2024, and in 2026, McDonalds Malaysia has also included Golden Prosperity Burger in the seasonal menu, with a slice of hash brown is also added on the burger patties; and Fish Prosperity Burger, a fish-based option for the menu between 2019, 2020 and in 2026. The Prosperity Burger is usually served together with curly fries. While during the Muslim holy month of Ramadhan since 2015, the chain would offer the Foldover (equivalent to the McArabia) to its customers, there are two variants of the foldover: Lazeez Foldover (Lazeez, which means "delicious" in Arabic) chicken patties with garlic sauce; and the Mashwi Foldover (Mashwi, meaning "food" in standard Arabic) is grilled beef topped with hot sauce.

In August 2019, the chain also momentary adopted the local pronunciation of "Mekdi" as its alternate name, an act on celebrating its local market during the Malaysian National Day. In 2020, there are 16 Malaysian outlets that endorsed the name as a temporary fixture on its signboard.

In May 2023, McDonald's Malaysia has announced the discontinuation of the Quarter Pounder along with the Spicy Beef Deluxe. Due to the announcement, both of the menus were heavily discounted from its original price for a limited amount of time to clear up the remaining stock. The offer lasted until it was discontinued in the beginning of August 2023 along with the Mega Mac. Other burgers such as Double GCB, Double Spicy Chicken McDeluxe, Double Filet-O-Fish and the Triple Cheeseburger can still be ordered on the menu with additional charges.

In July 2026, Mcdonald's Malaysia briefly reintroduce the Quarter Pounder as a limited-time offer item.

=== Pakistan ===
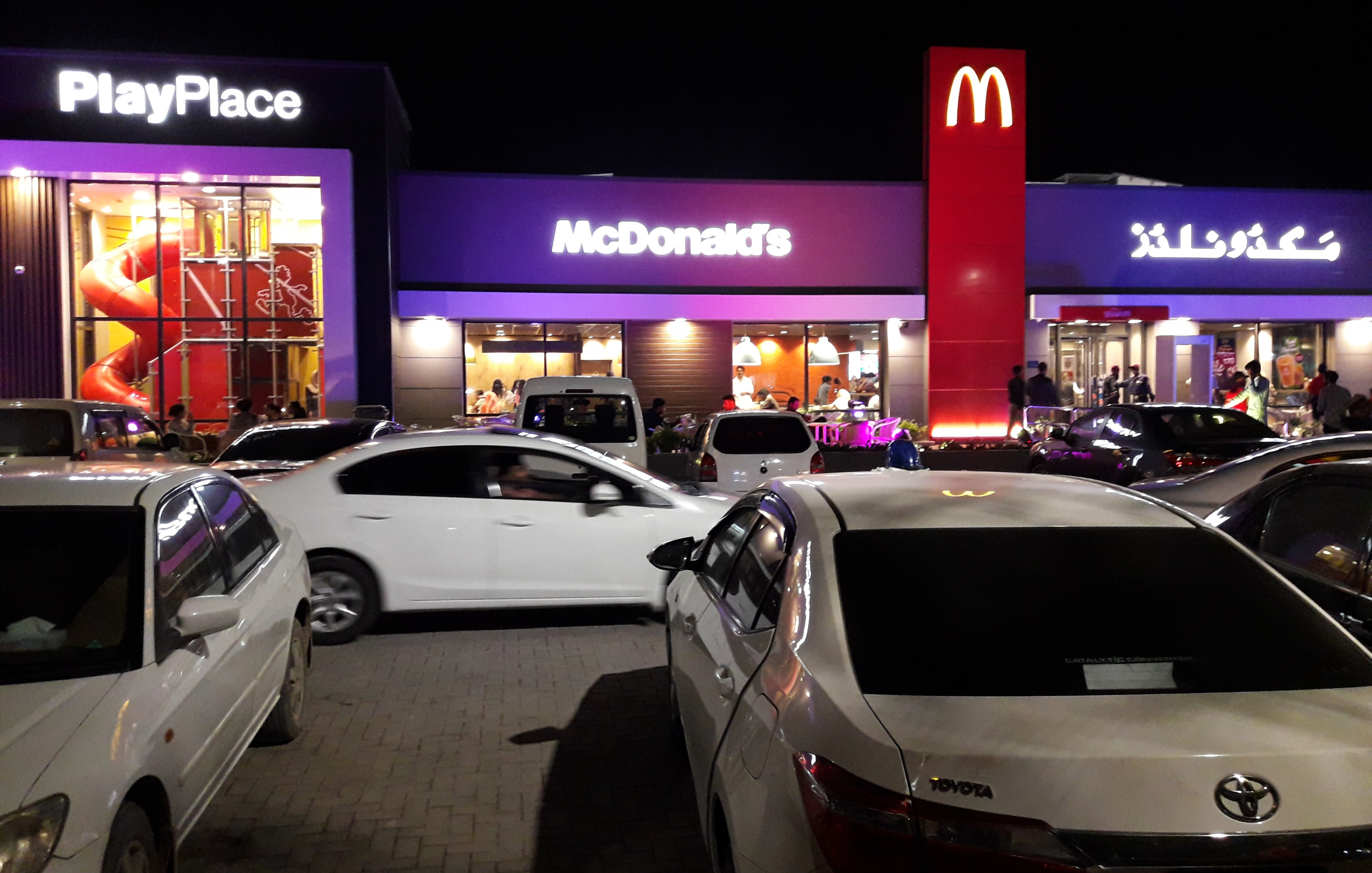
McDonald's outlet with drive-through and PlayPlace at Queens Road, Sargodha

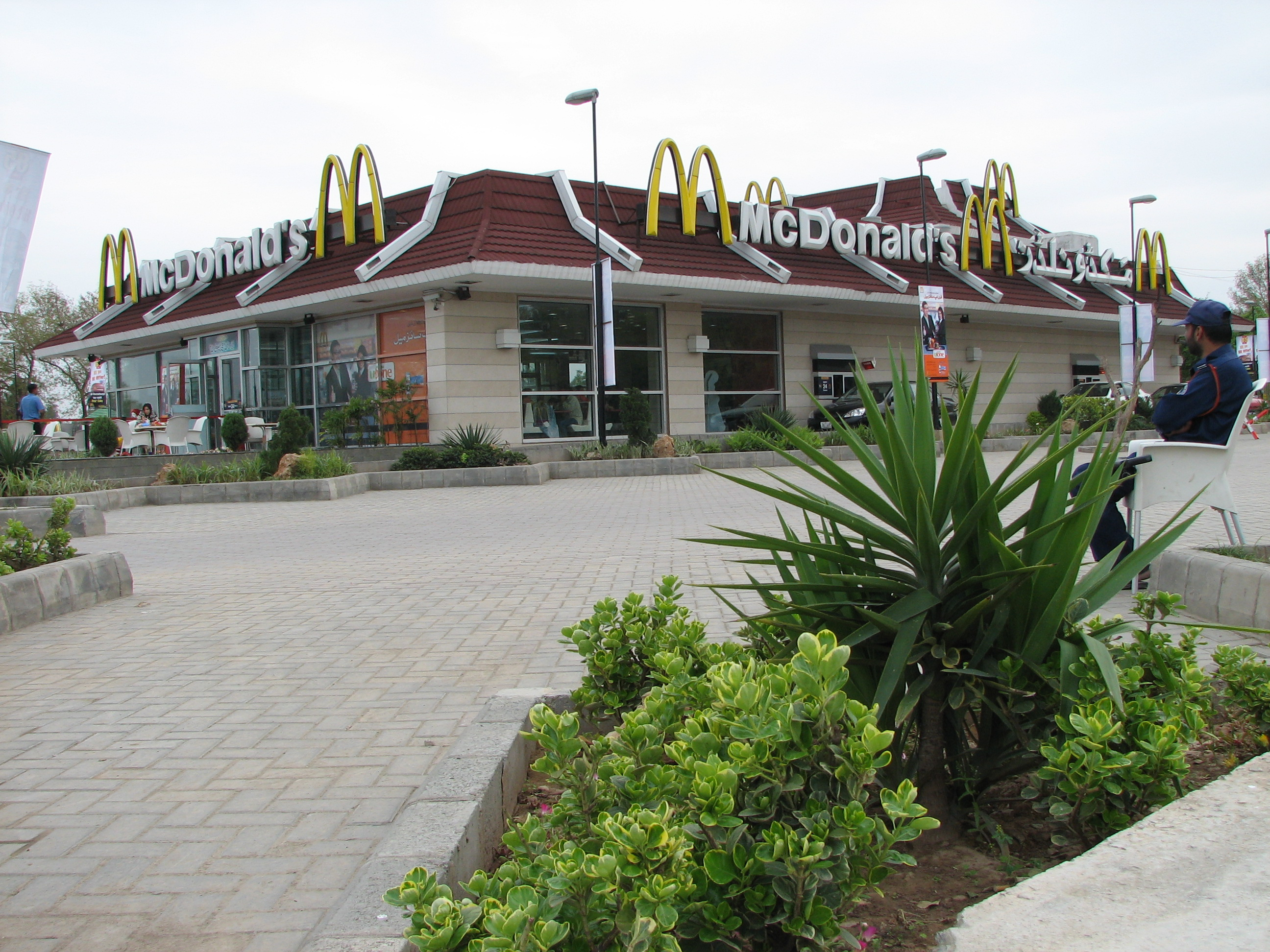
A stand-alone McDonald's outlet with drive-through at F-9 Park, Islamabad

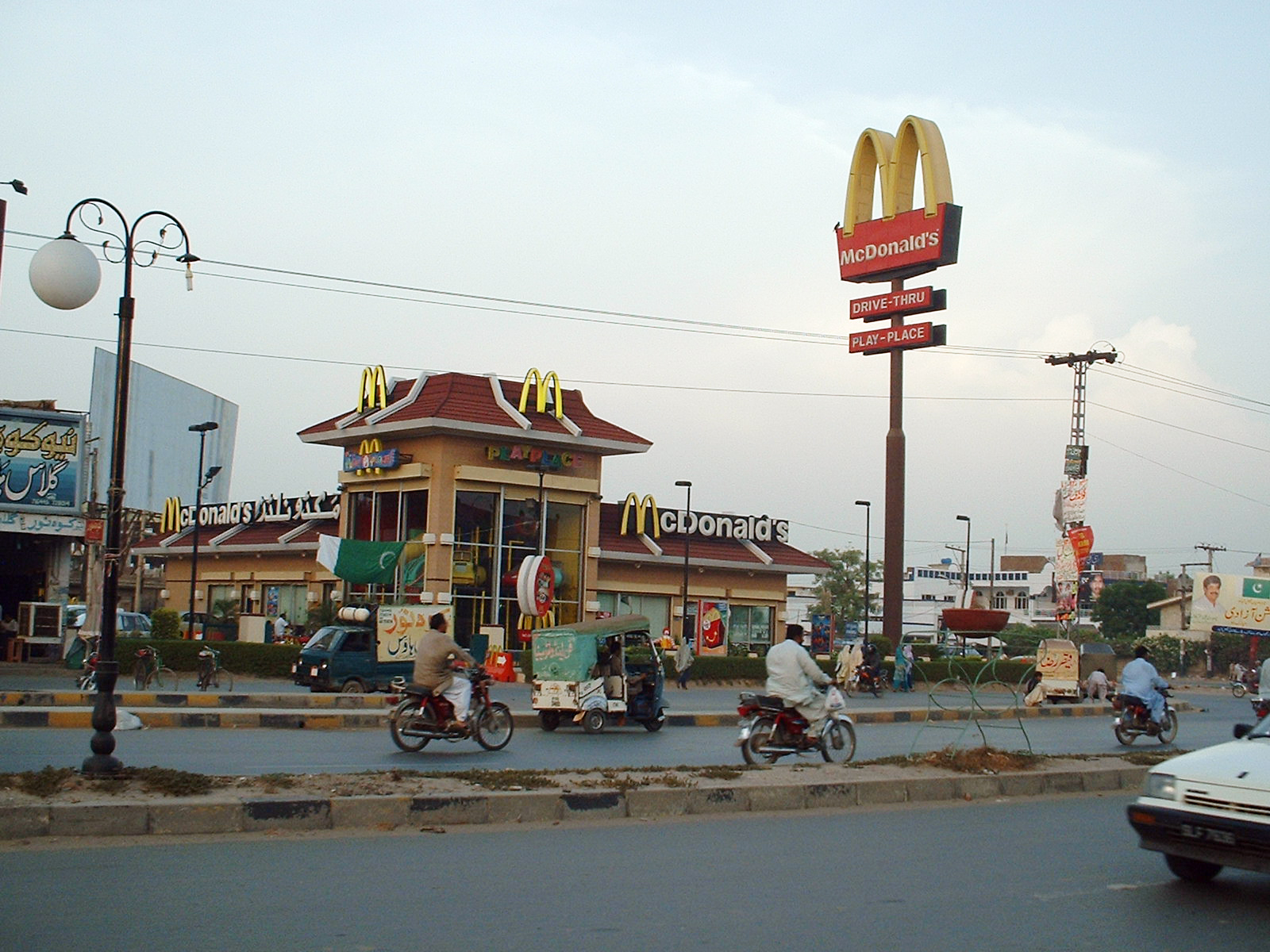
McDonald's outlet, Batala Colony, Faisalabad

McDonald's Pakistan currently operates 71 outlets across 24 major cities nationwide, serving millions of customers. In Pakistan, McDonald's first outlet was established in Lahore, followed by a second outlet a week later in Karachi, in September 1998. Its franchise locations include Karachi, Lahore, Faisalabad, Islamabad, Rawalpindi, Gujranwala, Peshawar, Multan, Hyderabad, Quetta, Sargodha, Bahawalpur, Sialkot, Sukkur, Sheikhupura, Rahim Yar Khan, Dera Ghazi Khan, Gujrat, Sahiwal, Abbottabad, Jhelum and Bahawalpur. The largest number of outlets is in Lahore, followed by Karachi and Islamabad-Rawalpindi.

All McDonald's outlets in Pakistan are certified halal. McDonald's Pakistan menu consists of a variety of chicken, beef, fish, hamburgers and cheeseburgers along with fried chicken, nuggets french fries etc. In addition to this, McDonald's Pakistan also serves several types of fruit pies, desserts, ice creams etc. It also serves juices, shakes and soft drinks in beverages. McCafé of McDonald's serves a large variety of items including cappuccinos, muffins, lattes, frappés, hot chocolates and cakes etc. In March 2019, McDonald's introduced a new food item in Pakistan named Bun Kabab (a local variation of Anday Wala Burger). In Pakistan, all menu items of McDonald's with the exception of ice cream cones are available for delivery.

=== Philippines ===
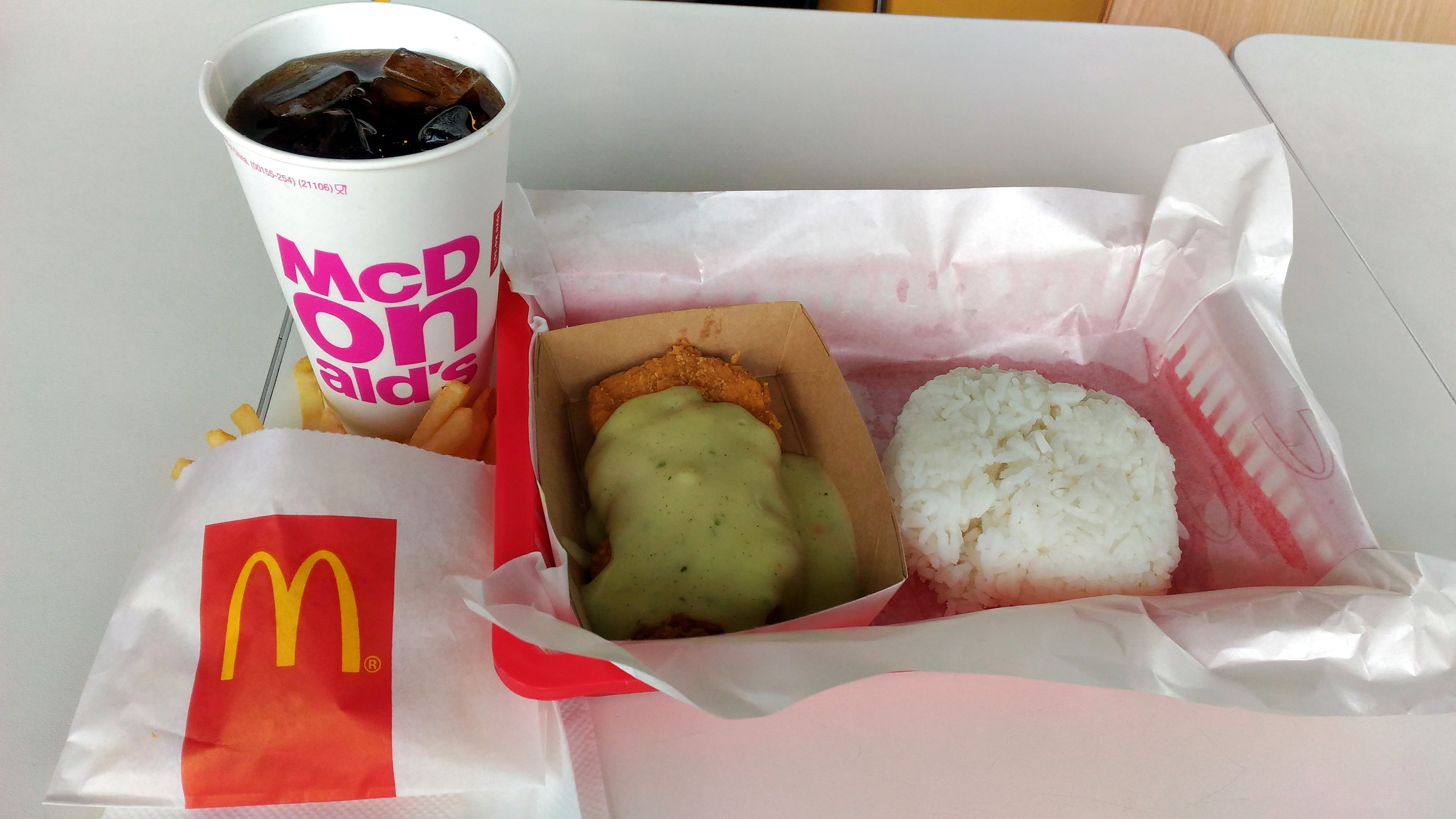
Example of Philippine McDonald's menu consists of Chicken Fillet Ala King served with fries, cola and steamed rice.

Most Filipinos colloquially refer to McDonald's as "McDo", and the term has been adapted by McDonald's Philippines, even naming most of their products after the term. (However, the use of "McDo" in an official capacity has been discontinued by the end of 2019 and it is now referred to its full form, McDonald's, except in item names.) Menu items in McDonald's in the Philippines include McSpaghetti, Chicken McDo, Burger McDo and McCrispy Chicken Sandwich, to compete with the country's largest fast-food retail Jollibee. From 2001 to 2003/2006 to 2007, the McRice, steamed rice formed into buns, was available as a replacement for bread buns on beef and chicken sandwiches. Breakfast menus include longaniza, a Philippine sausage, served with rice and a fried egg, and the Hamdesal, a Pandesal bun with pineapple glaze syrup, mayonnaise, and Canadian bacon served with scrambled eggs, cheese, or both. It also has the Cheesy Eggdesal, with Pandesal, cheese and scrambled eggs.

Some pies come in pineapple and taro flavors, although the McDonald's Apple Pie was served in all locations; however, it was discontinued as of June 2026. Only select locations serve milkshakes. Twister Fries is also served seasonally, as well as McShaker Fries (formerly Shake Shake Fries), which are McDonald's French Fries that come in a paper bag and served with a packet of flavored powder (Barbeque, Cheesy Butter, Sour Cream, Ketchup, Pizza, and Nori flavors); customers must administer the flavoring to the bag of fries themselves, shaking the bag until the powder is evenly distributed among the fries. They are available annually.

McDonald's in the Philippines also promotes movie tie-in products seasonally, such as the Banana-Oreo McFlurry and Banana McFloat during the release of Minions in 2015.

=== Saudi Arabia ===
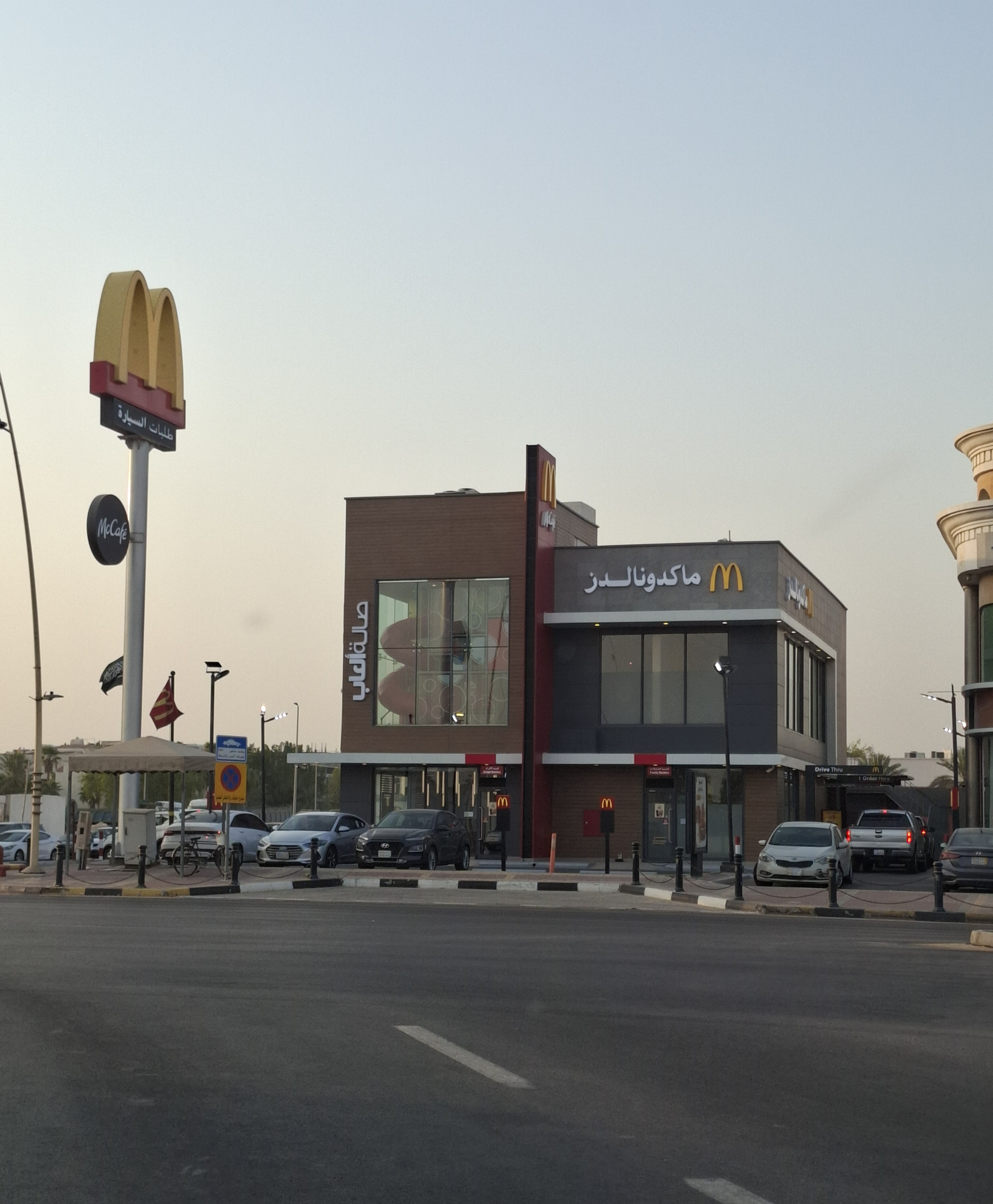
McDonald's In Al-Khobar Saudi Arabia

All McDonald's in Saudi Arabia are certified halal. Saudi locations serve the Spicy McChicken, McArabia, and the Big Tasty, the latter of which is also available in some European locations.

=== Singapore ===
Singaporean locations offer the McSpicy, a spicy chicken burger. A 24-hour McDelivery service is available in all locations on the island. All McDonald's outlets in Singapore are halal certified, to accommodate the Muslim population.

In 2011, due to congestion at the United States' West Coast ports, the popular curry sauce dip for Chicken McNuggets was unavailable for a period of time, causing a public outcry. A similar crisis happened in 2015.

In July 2016, McDonald's launched a limited edition take-home bottle of the curry sauce (375 ml), which was limited to four purchases per single receipt. The product was overwhelmingly popular and several outlets ran out of stock on the item extremely quickly.

McDonald's has also introduced several special additions to the Singapore menu, such as the Salted Egg Yolk Chicken Burger in 2016, coupled with salt & pepper shaker fries and Gula Melaka McFlurry.

McDonald's also introduced new and upgraded products related to Singapore's National Day and public holidays (e.g. Lunar New Year, SG50).

=== South Korea ===
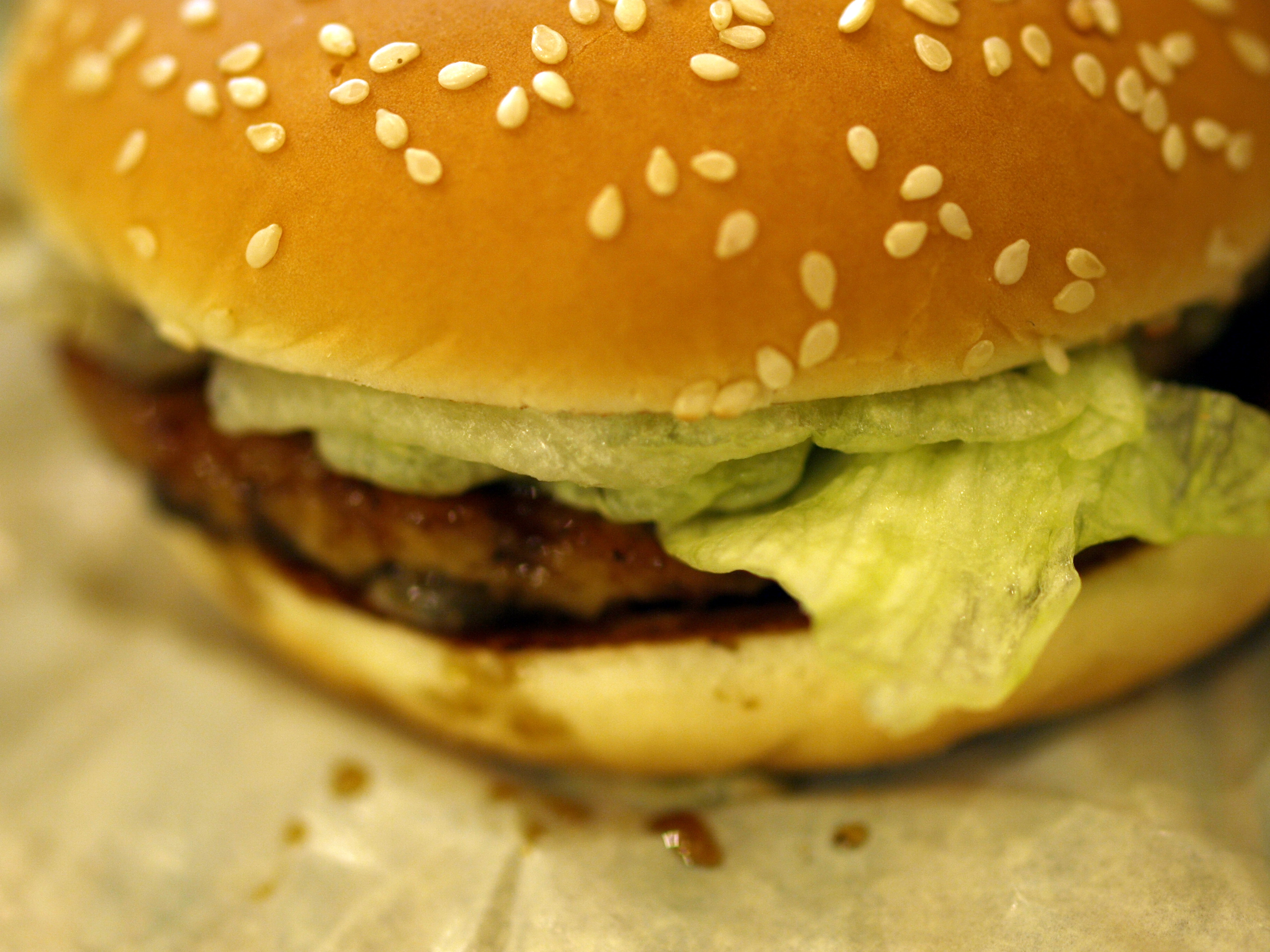
McDonald's Bulgogi burger in South Korea

McDonald's locations in South Korea serve a shrimp burger as well as a Bulgogi Burger, a pork patty in bulgogi marinade. The bulgogi-flavored sauce was developed by Ottogi, a large South Korean food manufacturer that provides all of the condiments to the country's McDonald's. A 24-hour McDelivery service was launched in 2007 and now is available across South Korea. McDelivery also has an app available on both Google Play and the Apple Store.

Dessert options include affogato. Former options included a green tea McFlurry and the McBingsu, a seasonal option similar to patbingsu.

As McDonald's Korea utilises local specialties to make new products which name is 'Taste of Korea', Changnyeong Garlic Burger, Boseong Green Tea Burger, Jindo Onion Croquet and Burgers are produced.

=== Sri Lanka ===
In March 2024, McDonald's removed Abans as their Sri Lankan local partner as part of its global franchise network owing to the poor quality supply of food items and unhygienic food items in McDonald's outlets all over Sri Lanka. Abans was criticised for failing to meet international hygiene standards when operating the McDonald's outlets in Sri Lanka. Around 12 McDonald's outlets in Sri Lanka were closed with immediate effect and McDonald's sign boards were covered up.

On 24 March 2024, Colombo Commercial High Court issued an enjoining order preventing Abans from using McDonald's name in their business marketing and promotional purposes. The Colombo Commercial High Court issued the court order following a lawsuit filed by McDonald's Corporation preventing Rusi Pestonjee, managing director of Abans PLC from any way or manner to use the name McDonald's or any name in any way or manner similar to the name McDonald's.

=== Taiwan ===
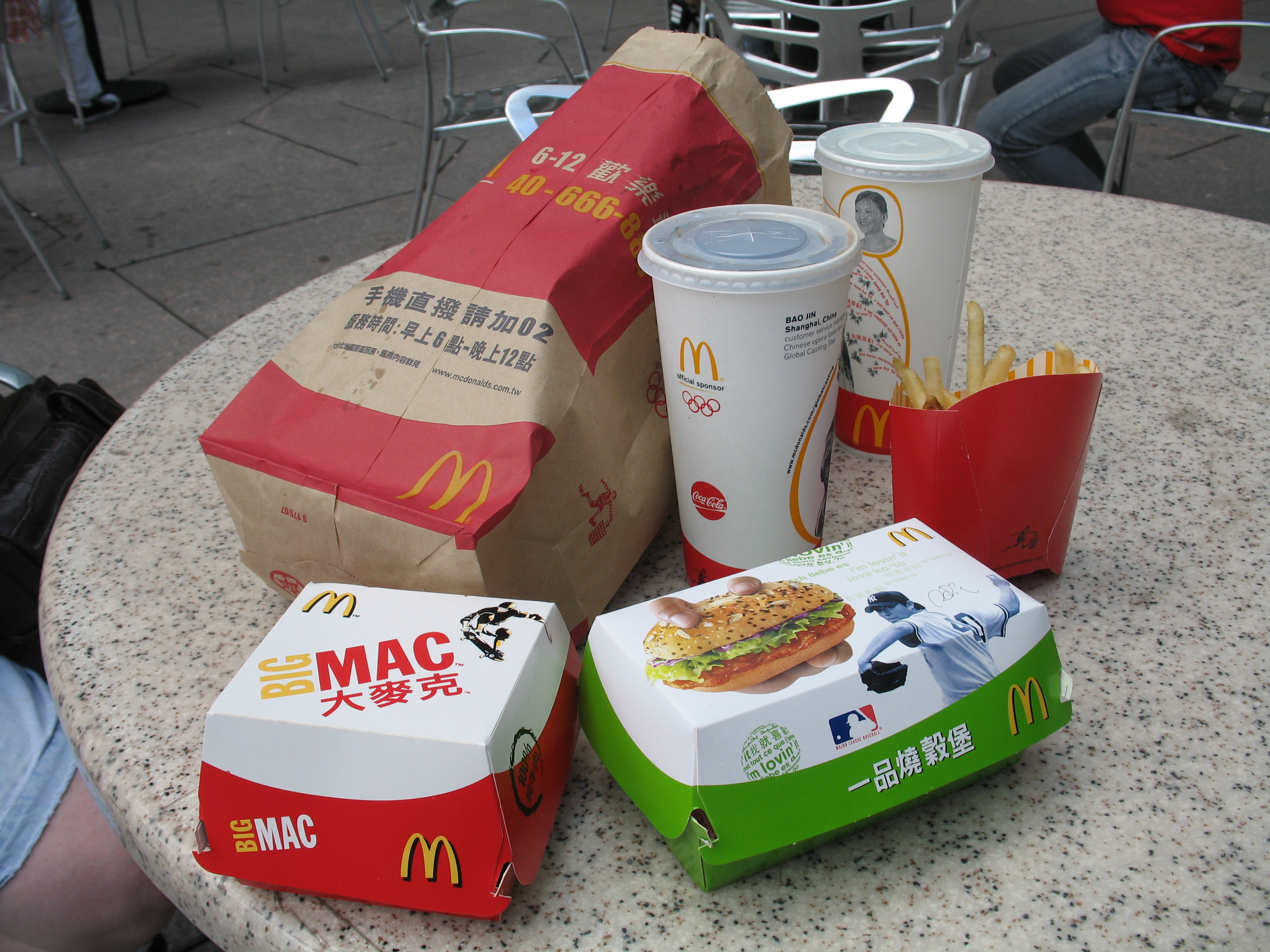
A McDonald's meal in Taiwan

McDonald's in Taiwan serve kao fan (烤飯, kǎo fàn) (literally "baked rice"), a burger-like entrée with rice patties instead of buns. It is modelled on the eponymous product of McDonald's Japanese rival, MOS Burger. McDonald's locations in Taiwan sell fried chicken legs to compete with TKK Fried Chicken. Additionally, corn soup is available as a substitute for French fries or à la carte.

=== Thailand ===
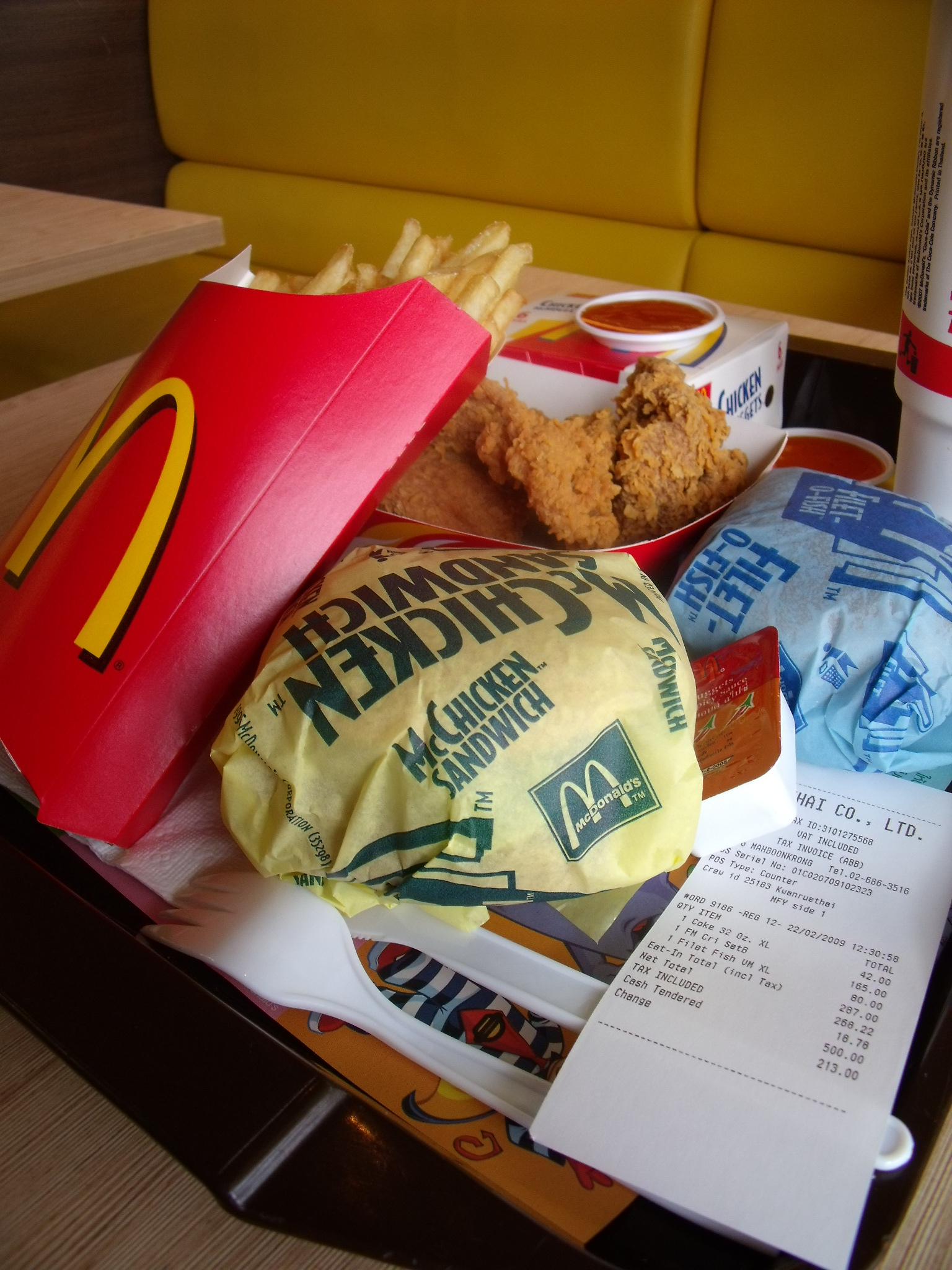
McChicken, Filet-O-Fish, Chicken McNuggets, French fries and fried chicken sold by McDonald's in Bangkok

In Thailand, McDonald's serves the Samurai Pork Burger, with teriyaki sauce, lettuce, and mayonnaise. As in other Asian markets, Thai McDonald's sell fried chicken and spicy chicken wings. Chilli sauce is available as a condiment, along with “tomato sauce”. “American ketchup” was available for years until it was discontinued during the COVID-19 pandemic. Other Thailand-specific items include rice patties made with jasmine rice, the Caribbean Shrimp Burger, and a salad shaker based on som tam papaya salad. McDonald's restaurants in Thailand also serve the Mega animals Mac (known as the Double Big Mac) all year long.

Between October 1 and 13, 2013, or until supplies ran out, McDonald's offered a "McVeggie" burger to coincide with the tradition of many people of Chinese descent only eating vegetarian food during the annual "Kin J" period. The McVeggie is an all vegetable fried patty consisting of potatoes, beets, peas and carrot topped with lettuce and teriyaki sauce.

=== United Arab Emirates ===
In the United Arab Emirates, as of 2016, McDonald's standard a-la-carte menu include the hamburger (marketed as "beefburger"), cheeseburger, double cheeseburger, chicken burger, veggie burger, Quarter Pounder, Big Mac, Mega Mac, Big N' Tasty, McRoyale, McChicken, Spicy McChicken, Chicken Mac, Chicken Mega Mac, Grand Chicken (Classic, Deluxe, Special, and Spicy variants), McArabia, Chicken McNuggets, and Filet-O-Fish sandwiches. In some outlets, the Indian-inspired Mc Aloo Tikki burger is also served as part of the McSavers and Happy Meal lines.

The McArabia initially was available as both a chicken and beef kofta variants, but only the chicken remained as standard, although the kofta and sujuk variants are sometimes reintroduced in limited promotional runs. Other limited edition sandwiches included The Asian, The Mexican, The French, and The Turkish. The standard menu formerly carried other McDonald's staples such as the Chicken Fillet, the Spicy Chicken Fillet, and the McWings.

McDonald's in the U.A.E. is a certified halal chain.

=== Vietnam ===
McDonald's in Vietnam serves rice dishes and fried chicken as part of their daily menu, similar to other competing chains. Vietnamese coffee is also available.

In 2016, McDonald's Vietnam introduced their versions of Bánh mì, including the Grilled Pork Baguette, the Ham Cheese Baguette with Round Egg and the Ham Cheese Baguette with Veggie. These are currently unavailable.

McDonald's launched the Pho-flavoured burger to celebrate the Vietnam's National Day in 2020, consisting of beef patties, cilantro, eggs, onion and special Phở-flavoured sauce. The burger also make use of a special type of bun that resembles the McMuffin.

== Europe ==
=== Baltic countries ===
In the Baltic countries, most of the menu follows a standard European pattern. Around 2001, the Lauku Mac (Latvian for "Rural/Country Mac", see Poland for more details) was available in Latvia, but was later discontinued. In 2022, food bloggers from the three countries contributed to the launch of Maestro gourmet bourgers. The Maestro Beef includes Cheddar cheese, tomato, Jalapeño, iceberg salad, rucola, red onion and tomato grill sauce. The Maestro Chicken replaces Cheddar with Emmental cheese and the tomato sauce with a relish sauce, omitting jalapeño and red onion.

=== Belgium ===
Belgian McDonald's serve the Croque McDo, consisting of two slices of Emmental cheese and a slice of ham toasted between two hamburger buns. This is a variation of the traditional croque monsieur sandwich found in France and Belgium. The "Belgo" burger is a hamburger with bacon, Belgian Maredsous cheese, roasted onions and cocktail sauce.

=== Croatia ===
The McCountry sandwich is a regular menu item in Croatian McDonald's restaurants, consisting of two pork sausage patties on a bun with cheese, lettuce, tomato, onion, and a special sauce. Another regular menu item is the McToast, a ham and cheese sandwich on toast. The Maestro Burger can also be found which is normally seen in the Netherlands. Seasonal and promotional offers include Greek and Italian offerings.

The Chikker sandwich served in Poland is also available in Croatia.

=== Cyprus ===
McDonald's in Cyprus used to sell the Greek Mac, a Big Mac variant with pita bread and tzatziki sauce, and the Greek Chicken, a Greek Mac with chicken patties instead of beef. The Greek Mac was discontinued and the Greek Chicken was renamed as Grilled Chicken. A shrimp burger is also sold during the period of Lent when Orthodox Christians do not eat meat. This only applies to the Republic of Cyprus, and not Northern Cyprus, where due to the lack of international recognition, McDonald's does not exist.

=== Czech Republic ===
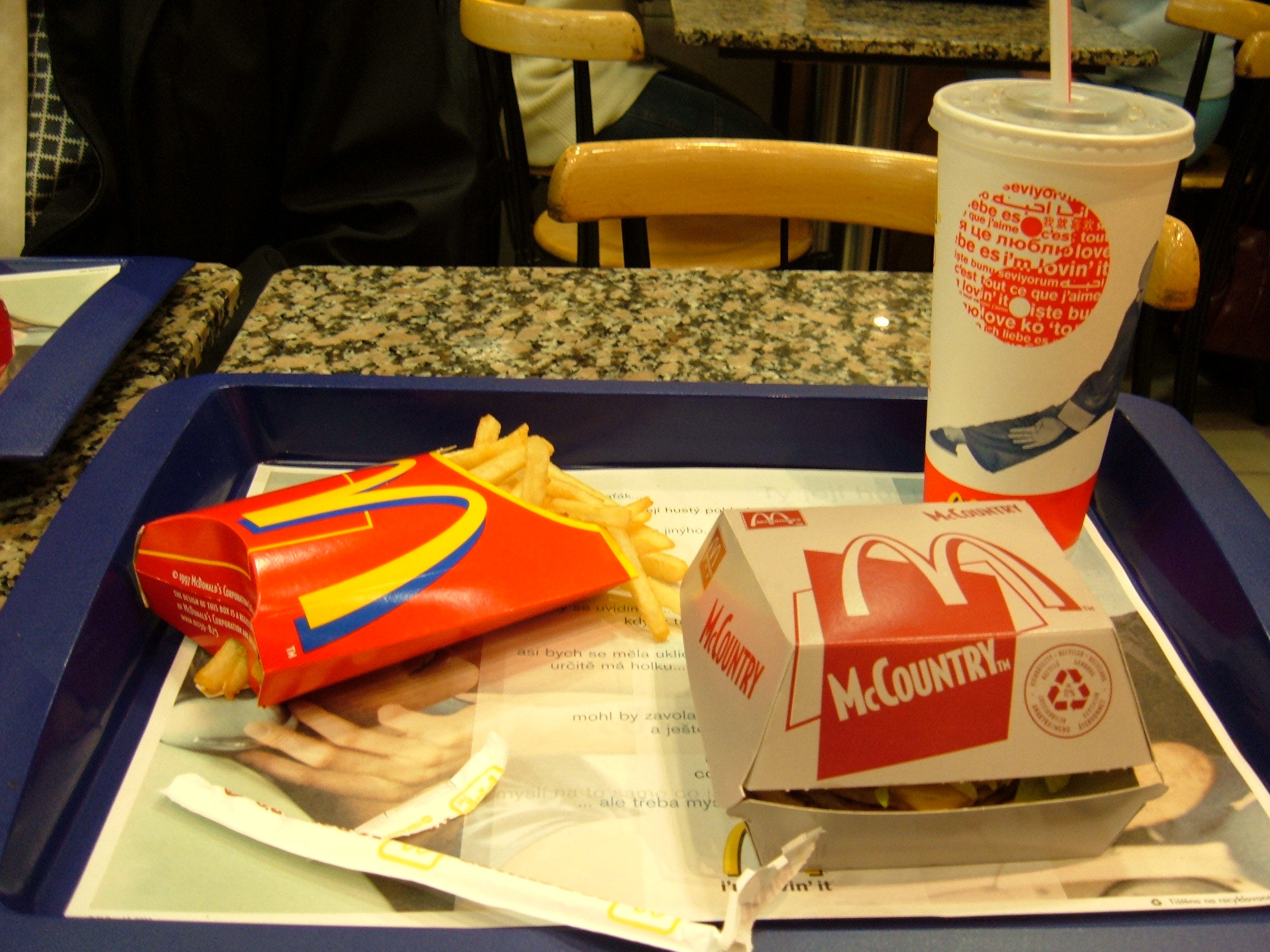
A McCountry meal in Prague

The McCountry sandwich served in Croatia is also available in the Czech Republic.

In 2012, McDonald's added McSmažák, a variation on smažený sýr, a type of cheese sandwich. It is similar to the Slovak McSyr.

In the first half of 2019, McDonald's removed Big Tasty sandwich from its menu. It was brought back in June 2019.

=== Denmark ===
One item sold in McDonald's that tries to imitate classic Danish food is the Pommes Frites and Pepper Sauce that somewhat resembles remoulade. This also for a long period from the opening of the first restaurant replaced mayonnaise dip and where the only condiment available besides ketchup. Every Danish McDonald's restaurant serves a small size chicken burger called "Chicken Salsa Cheese". Also following its other Scandinavian cousins, Danish McDonald's restaurant serve a Daim McFlurry. Customers can also buy chilli cheese tops, which is also served in other Nordic countries like Sweden and Norway.

=== Finland ===
In Finland, most McDonald's hamburgers can be ordered with a rye bun, based on the success of the promotional "McRuis" (McRye) burger. McFeast has been on the menu in Finland from the start and still is. El Maco is a burger with salsa and sour cream sauce. The El Maco meal is served with a barbecue spice mixture and a paper bag in which the fries and the spice mixture are poured, similar to Japan's Shaka Shaka Chicken. In 2018 McDonald's released the Big Mac with bacon. Also same as in Sweden, they are offering McVegan patty for vegans in wraps, salad or as a burger. Macarons are also served as a McCafé product. In early 2018 they released Valio Oltermanni Juustonapit which is basically small cheese nuggets filled with the famous Finnish cheese.

=== France ===
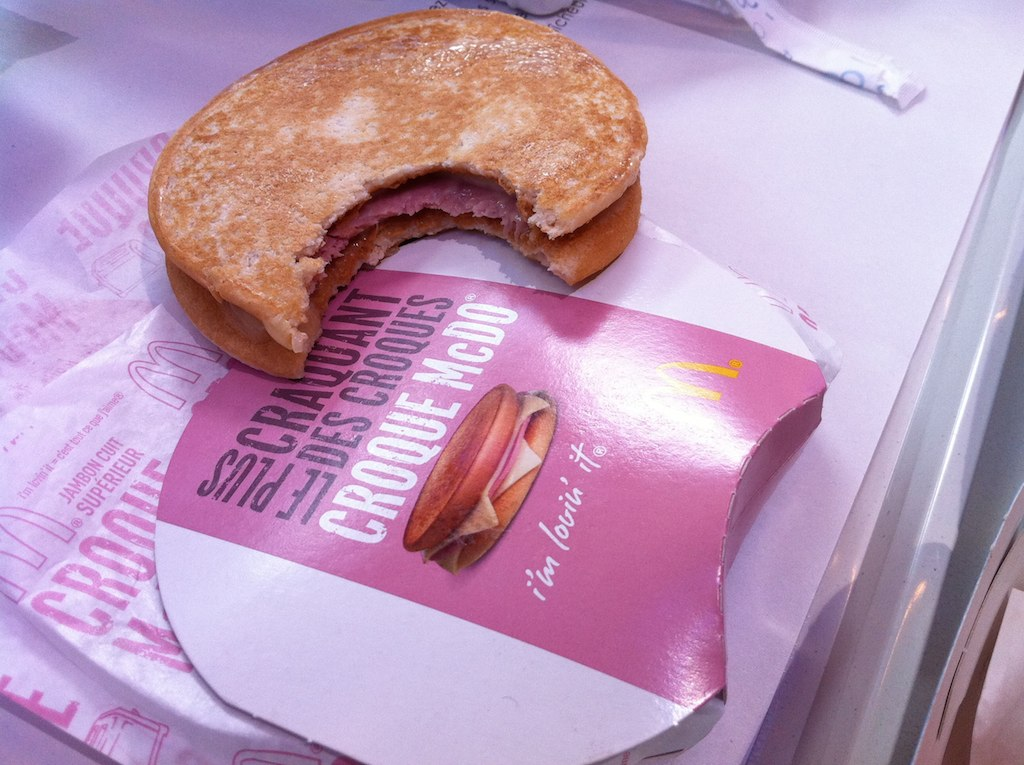
The Croque McDo

In France, McDonald's offers donuts for breakfast and Kronenbourg Brewery beer in 25 or 33 cl measures. The Croque McDo and various Petit Plaisir items are available, as in Belgium and Morocco, respectively. In 2016, McDonald's launched a summer menu, called the "American Summer" Menu, with one burger containing crispy peppers. In France, McDonald's also serve the McBaguette, a sliced baguette with beef, lettuce, tomatoes, cheese and mustard.

=== Germany ===
Standard menu items at German McDonald's include the Hamburger Royal TS, Caesar salads, a vegan burger called Big Vegan TS, and Caesar, honey mustard, and Ranch chicken wraps. The McRib sandwich, a seasonal item in most countries, is a permanent menu item in Germany.

As of Mid-February 2013, McDonald's Germany started selling the McCurrywurst with bread roll or Fries, a hot sausage with tangy tomato sauce and Curry powder in mild and spicy. The item is no longer sold and saw a short revival as McCurrywurst Chicken in 2019.

Beer is no longer sold at all locations. It is still served in older outlets owned by German brewers with leases allowing the serving of beer.

=== Greece ===
McDonald's in Greece currently sells the classic McDonald's items as found in most of the world. The regular menus also include the McToast, a ham and cheese sandwich on toast, Deluxe fries (potato wedges), the Big Tasty beef (also double beef big tasty) and chicken burgers and onion rings.

During the period of Lent when some Orthodox Christians abstain from eating meat, McDonald's also offers the McVeggie burger, a Shrimp Burger, a McWrap Shrimp, fried veggie snackers, spring rolls, and fried shrimp with dipping sauce.

=== Hungary ===
Hungarian McDonald's sell the McFarm (a burger with pork patties instead of beef), once available in Greece. Limited-time products available only in Hungary have included McDonald's version of the popular Hungarian breakfast food lángos, and a "Hungarian flavors" menu. You can only in Hungary get the Spicy pork burger and the mustard pork burger. In addition to these, members of the seasonal "Maestro family" with imaginative fantasy names are also available (e.g.: Brutal Brutus, Som Lolly).

=== Italy ===
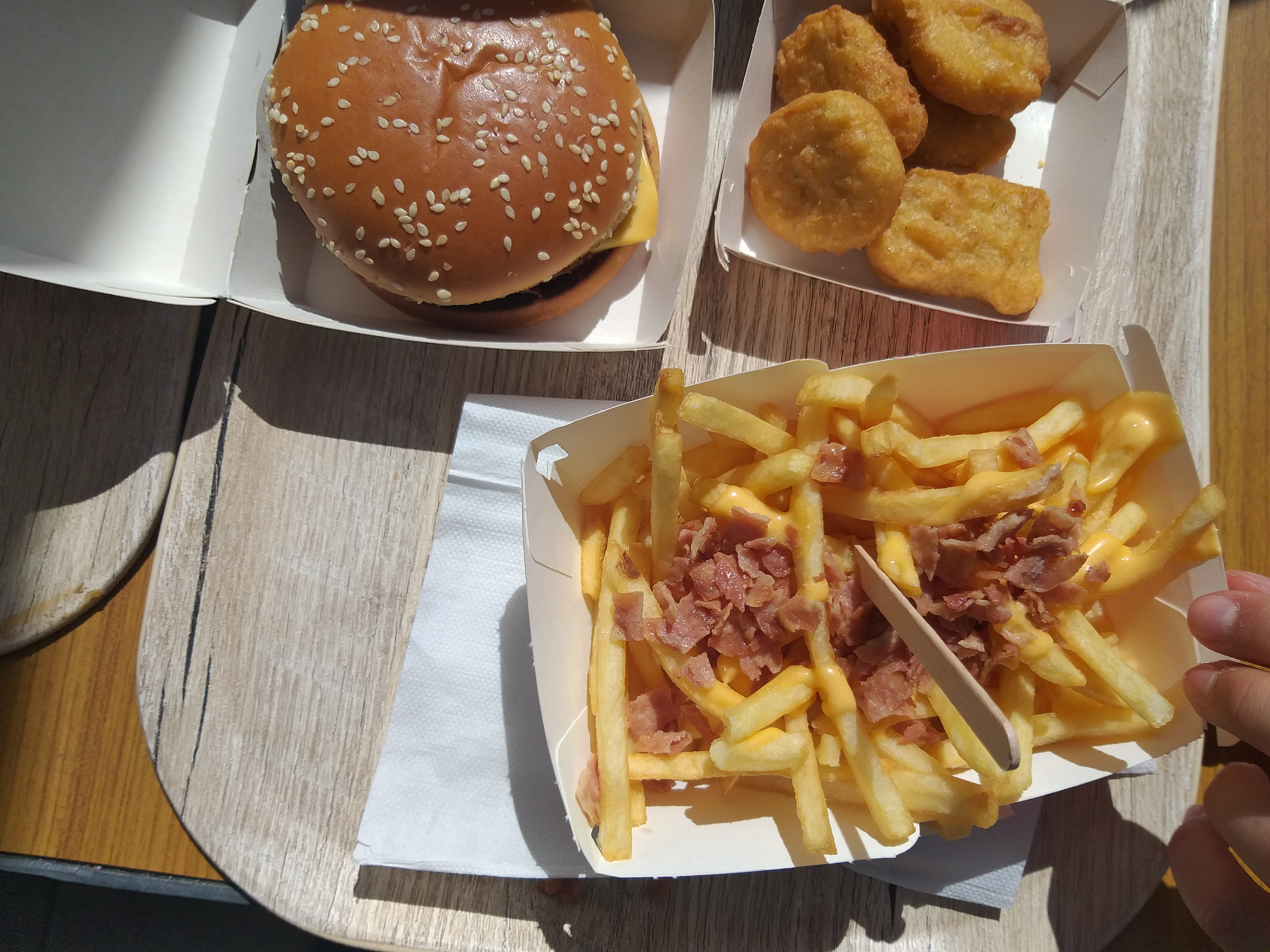
A McDonald's meal in Italy consisting of a cheeseburger, Chicken McNuggets and cheese and bacon fries

Since 2000 Italian McDonald's offers the Crispy McBacon, composed of two beef patties, one slice of cheddar, bacon and a special sauce. In 2014, a variation with chicken has been offered in a limited way. It also began offering "McItaly" items from 2010 to 2017 in a limited period. Products include burger with "100 percent made-in-Italy meat" and various typical Italian ingredients. The company advertises burgers in several European countries as using Italian beef, because Cremonini provides it also in various locations. On May 24, 2013, McDonald's Italia in cooperation with Barilla began offering a pasta salad for a limited period. McCafè, launched in 2005, has also been adapted to Italian taste. From May 2015, the menu included for a limited time the vegetarian burger McVeggie, offered here with no cheese.

A Nutella burger called Sweety debuted in 2016.

Since 2018, McDonald's replaced McItaly with "My selection", special limited offer burgers with high quality Italian and foreign ingredients, selected by MasterChef judge Joe Bastianich.

=== Malta ===
In Malta, McDonald's sell mozzarella sticks and chicken wings as side dishes. The Big Tasty is a variant to the Big N' Tasty while chicken nuggets come with an array of sauces, such as BBQ, sweet and sour, ketchup or mayonnaise. The McCafe was also first introduced in Malta, more specifically on its sister island Gozo, where the only McDonald's and McCafe on the island are found in the Arcadia shopping centre in the capital city of Victoria. It is also the place where the McFtira was sold, a beef or chicken burger with the addition of goat cheese and served in traditional Maltese bread.

=== Netherlands ===
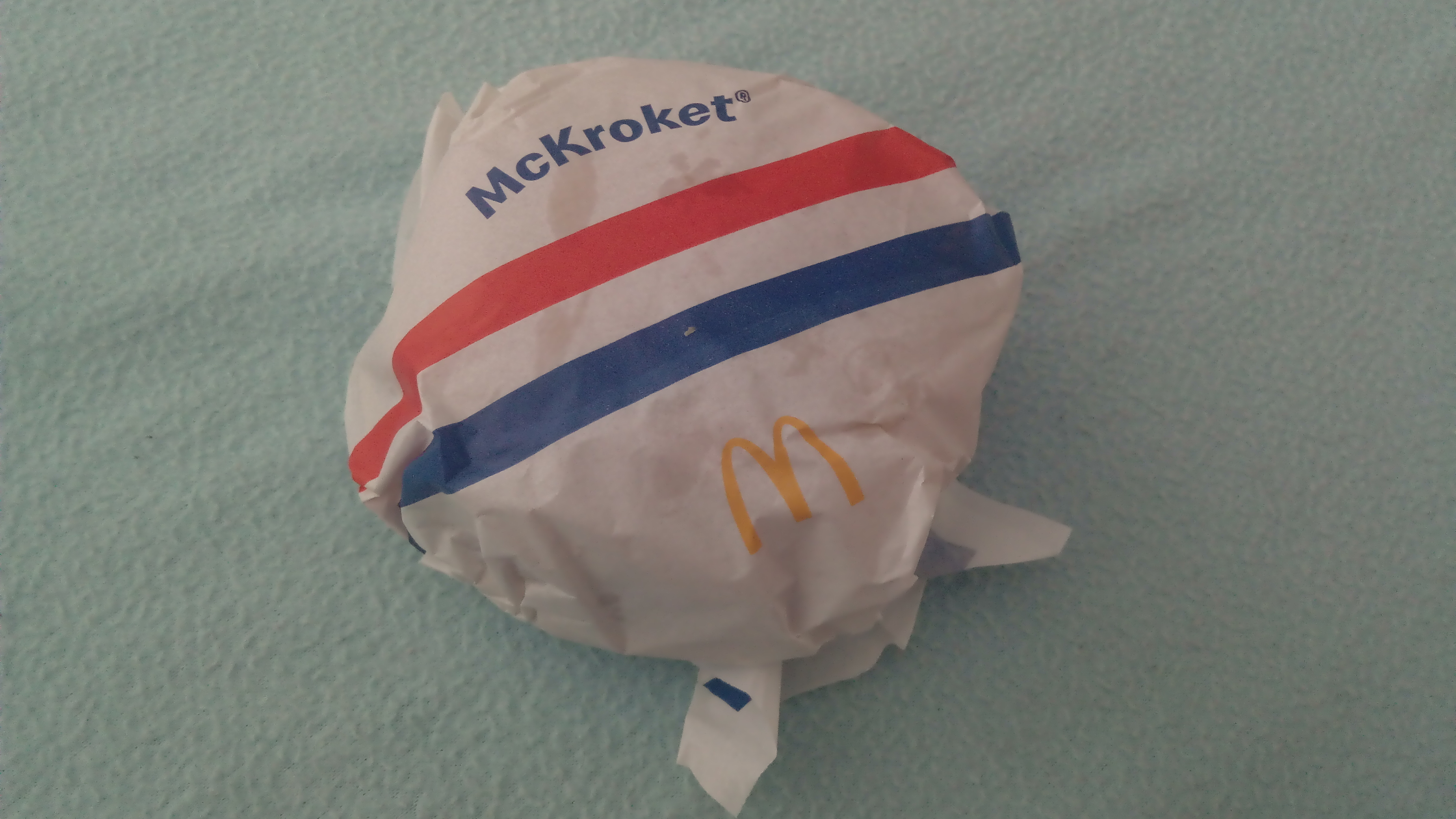
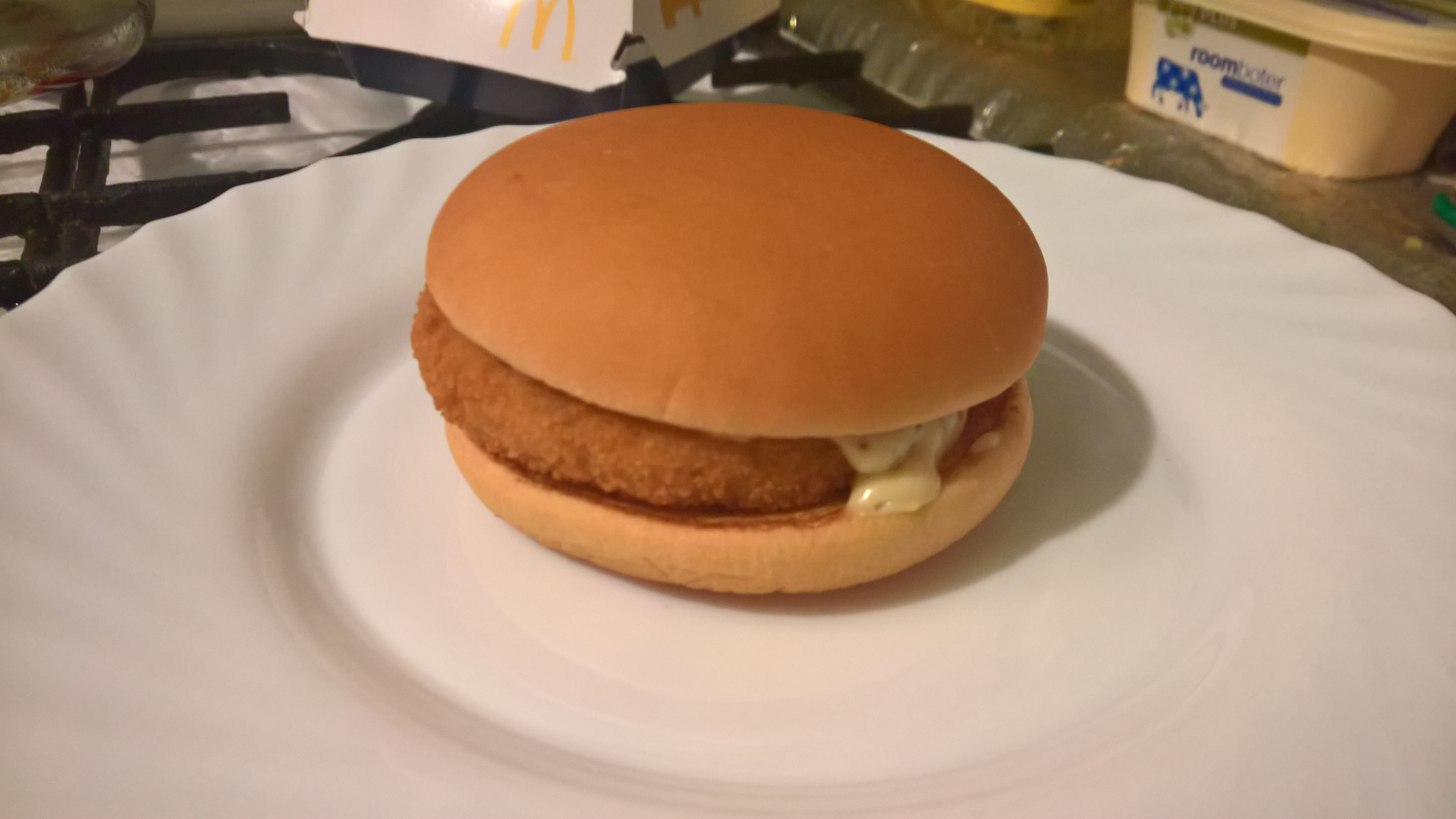
A McKroket in and out of the packaging

In the Netherlands, McDonald's sells the McKroket, a deep-fried roll containing beef ragout, similar to the Dutch "kroket" or the smaller "bitterballen" sold in virtually all snack bars. Dutch McDonald's serve Fritessaus or "American Sauce," a yellow mayonnaise-like sauce not eaten in the United States with French fries. The ChickenSaté burger was also offered, consisting of fried chicken with peanut sauce; this popular food is inspired by the Netherlands' historical connection to Indonesia. The Joppie Burger was also available using Joppie sauce, popular in the Netherlands. Since 2015, the Maestro Burger has been available. The Maestro Burger is a large burger with sesame seed bread, 2 Angus beef patties, onion, lettuce, bacon and mustard. The Chicken Maestro Burger, and the Maestro Burger Egg, a version of the regular burger with an added egg, have been made available since the original burger's launch. Also included in the menu is "Boerenfriet", which are thick, large fries, as commonly found in burgerbars, as well as regular mayonnaise. The introduction of the Maestro Burger is part of the revamp McDonald's is going through in the Netherlands since change of directors, focussing more on customers that seek higher quality burgers and that who would usually visit burgerbars. Special Dutch drinks include Fristi (a yogurt drink) and Chocomel (a chocolate milk drink). Also available in the Netherlands are stroopwafel McFlurries.

=== Norway ===
As in Finland, Norwegian McDonald's serve the El Maco (on a seasonal basis) and offer gluten free buns without an extra cost. They also serve a Laksewrap, deep-fried fish with salad and a mango slice in a tortilla.

Another popular burger option available in Norway is the Chicken Salsa. Chicken Salsa is a chicken burger with crispy lettuce, salsa sauce, sour cream and nachos.

In 2002, the McAfrika burger was introduced in Norway, coinciding with major famines in Southern Africa. The name of the burger drew much negative publicity as being highly insensitive. The burger with vegetables were placed in pita bread.

In 2009, a blueberry milkshake themed around Julenatt i Blåfjell (as opposed to Grimace) was released, apparently without asking the Blåfjell franchise's creator and licence granter Gudny Hagen for permission or giving her advance notice. The milkshake was delisted some months later.

=== Poland ===
Offerings in Polish McDonald's restaurants include:

- the WieśMac ("Rural Mac" or "Country Mac" or "Village Mac"), a quarter-pound beef patty with onions, lettuce, cheese, fresh tomato slices, mustard, and a mayonnaise-horseradish sauce on a sesame seed bun;
- the Red Chikker, a chicken sandwich with lettuce and mild Mexican-style sauce;
- Chikker, a chicken sandwich with lettuce and honey-mustard sauce
- McWrap – tortilla with chicken available in two versions: Classic (mayonnaise, mild-Mexican sauce, lettuce, rucola, shredded cheese, two slices of tomato and chicken patty) and Bekon DeLuxe ("Bacon DeLuxe"; honey-mustard sauce, lettuce, shredded cheese, two slices of tomato, two strips of bacon and chicken patty).
- McMuffin Twarożek i Rzodkiewka - a McMuffin with cottage cheese, radishes, arugula, butter, and spices.

During winter period one can get Burger Drwala ("The Lumberjack's Burger") – a big bun with pork rinds instead of sesame, a quarter pounder, bacon, big piece of deep-fried cheese, sauce and vegetables. There are other variants of the Burger Drwala with extra beef patty, chicken patty in place of beef, jalapeño peppers and spicy sauce, cranberry, and a vegetable patty instead of meat and cheese roll in place of the pork one.

Until December 31, 2018, there was a free apple in every Happy Meal. Since January 1, 2019 it was switched to pieces of apple and it is possible to replace small fries with carrots.

=== Portugal ===
Portuguese McDonald's offers a variety of soups, including their national dish of kale soup (caldo verde) and cream of carrot, cream of peas, and white bean and spinach soup. These are offered as add-ons to Happy meals as well. There is also a McBifana and a McPrego on a ciabatta roll. The Portugal-specific mixed salad contains olives, corn, onions and tomatoes. In November 2016, McDonald's Portugal introduced a vegetarian burger option called McVeggie (made from quinoa, bell peppers, wheat flour, wheat protein, vegetable oil, wheat bran, eggs, vegetable starch, spices, salt, onion, garlic, green peas, sugar and mixed herbs). For dessert there are Portugal-specific fresh pineapple chunks, apple cinnamon sundae and a sandwich-shaped apple pie. In 2018, McDonald's released a limited-time edition of the Big Mac Bacon, essentially a Big Mac with added bacon. Beer is available in all restaurants. In October of the same year, Chicken Country has been introduced as a cheap option (EuroPoupança) to purchase, considered as a side with any menu, like many other products.

McDonald's Portugal launched a loyalty programme under the name MLovers, in the form of an app. This scheme allows adherents to collect points on purchased products and exchange them for products and / or experiences.

=== Russia ===
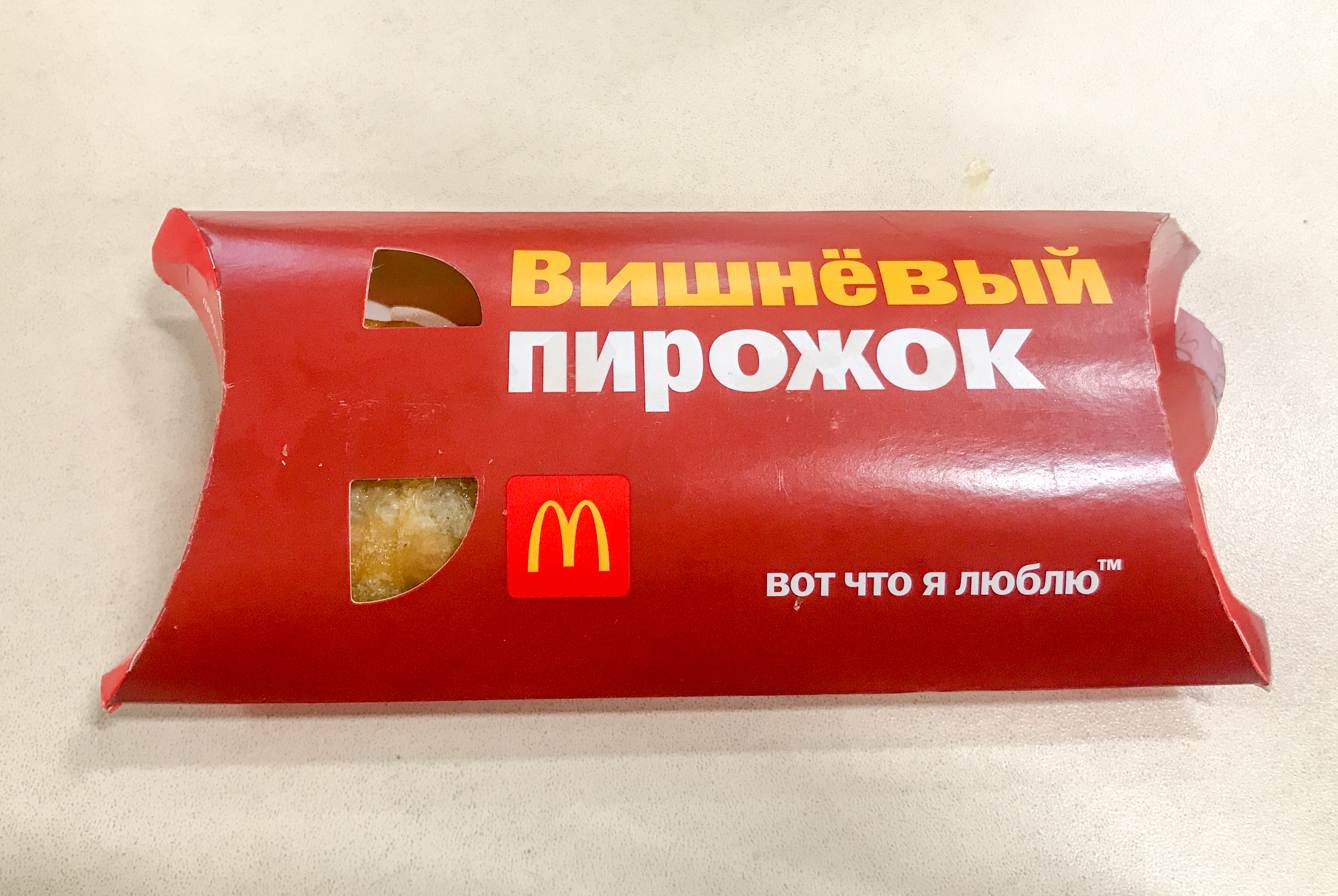
A cherry pie

Before it terminated its operations in the country, McDonald's sold special burgers with ingredients 100% made in Russia such as cheese, bread, tomatoes, beef, bacon, and lettuce. They were launched in 2015 under the "Биф А-ля Рус (Beef à la Russe)" name, designed to be authentic Russian native hamburgers. McDonald's restaurants in Russia served chicken wings and shrimps. The McZavtrak (McBreakfast) menu offered cheesecake rolls, blini and oatmeal.

Following the 2022 Russian invasion of Ukraine, the McDonald's brand pulled out of Russia and all former McDonald's locations were sold to local chains, with many being rebranded as fast-food restaurants under the Vkusno i tochka brand serving nearly identical fare to the previous McDonald's locations in the country.

=== Serbia ===
In Serbia, McDonald's offers a shake and a series of McFlurries themed around Plazma, an extremely popular local brand of biscuits. Restaurants around the country also serve beer.

=== Slovakia ===
In Slovakia, McDonald's offers the McSyr during seasonal campaigns, a sandwich containing breaded fried cheese and tartar sauce which emulates the Slovak dish vyprážaný syr. It is similar to the Czech McSmažák. Also, like in the United Kingdom, McDonald's restaurants in Slovakia serve donuts, which are named McDonuts. McDonuts can be served with either vanilla or chocolate frosting.

=== Slovenia ===
The McCountry sandwich served in Croatia is also available in Slovenia, but since 2020 it has been replaced by Bacon Cheese Burger. Since March 2021 it is again a regular menu item. Slovenia is unique in that it serves party buckets which can include fried shrimp and chicken wings, which are also available individually.

=== Spain ===
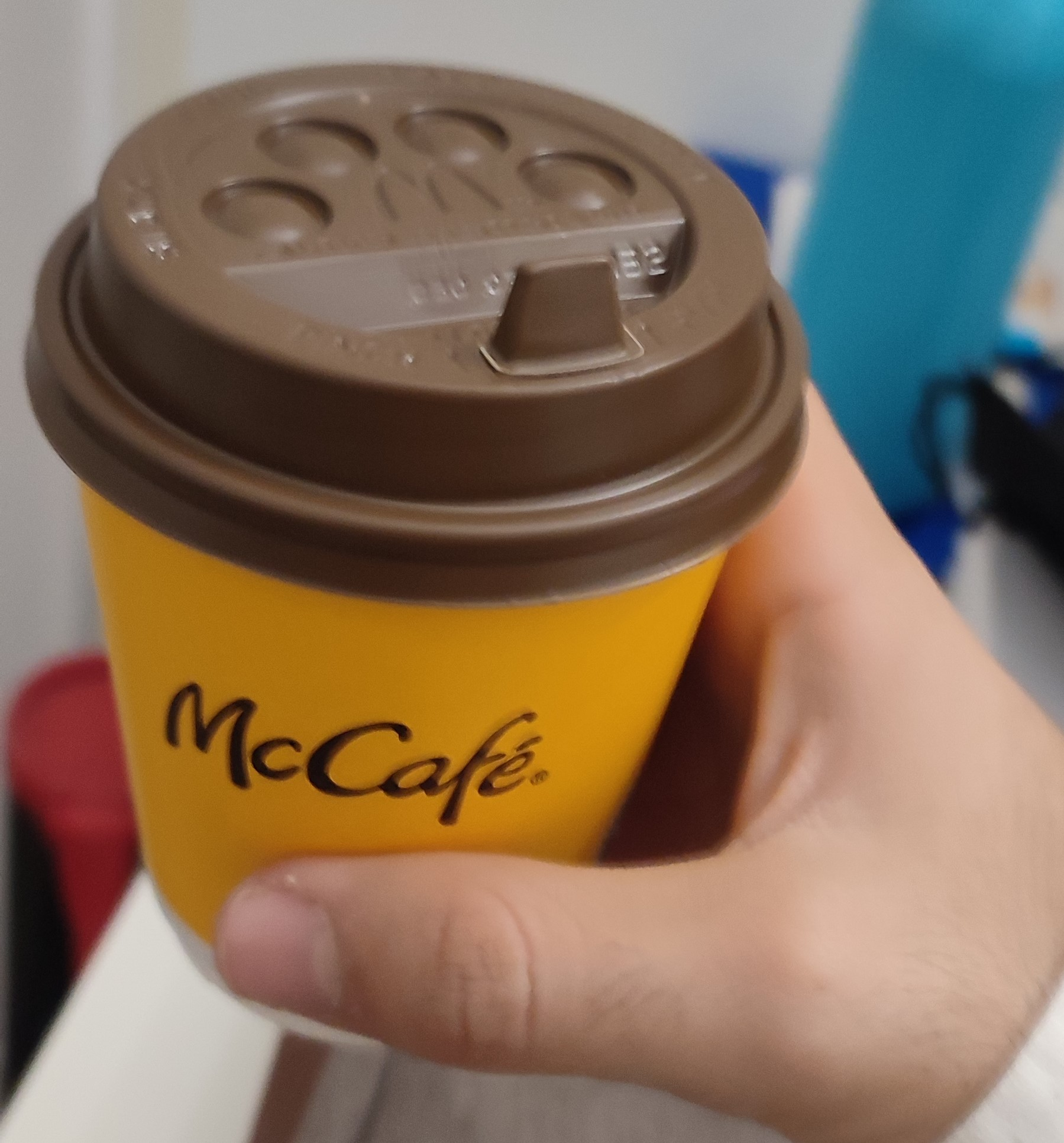
A McCafé coffee in Spain

Some distinctive offerings on the McDonald's menu in Spain as of 2023 include an eggs Benedict sandwich, a variant of Filet-O-Fish called "McFish" which features the fried fish patty topped with only ketchup, and a McBreakfast menu which offers donuts, croissants, potato tortilla sandwiches and toast with jamon Iberico or oil and tomatoes.

They also offer the option to prepare any burger gluten-free as well as some gluten-free cakes.

McCafé in Spain offers various pastries as well, ranging from McPops (donuts with various fillings) to cheesecakes and carrot cake. In the past, macarons were also available.

=== Sweden ===
Swedish McDonald's offer gluten free buns at no extra cost, and occasionally, when there is a time-limited campaign, serve the El Maco. Since 2018 McDonalds in Sweden also serves an all vegan burger called the McVegan. This burger is served with a vegan patty made out of soy, lettuce, tomatoes, cucumber, onions and vegan McFeast Sauce. Swedish McDonalds also serve a variety of dipping sauces including The McFeast sauce, Garlic, Hot, Truffle mayo and Korean BBQ.

For happy meals, customers can select a book instead of a toy.

=== Switzerland ===
Swiss McDonalds serve "The Prime" Burger, a beef burger with bacon, Gruyère cheese and special sauces created by Swiss Chef René Schudel. With a current price of CHF 10.90 (approx. USD 12.00) for the burger alone, it is one of the most expensive McDonald's burgers worldwide.

=== Turkey ===
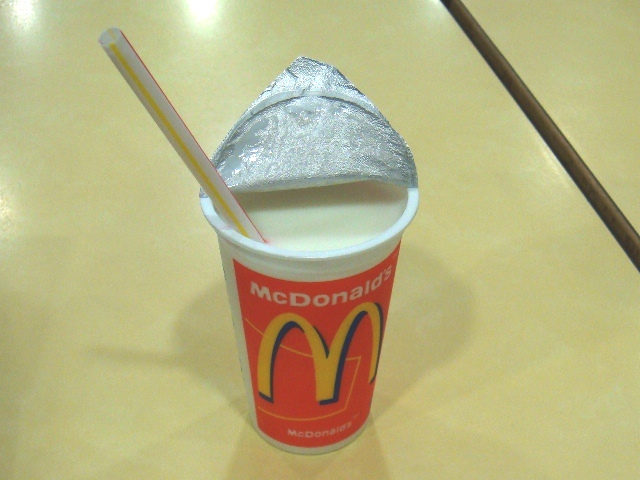
Ayran

All McDonald's meat in Turkey are certified halal by Pinar, a Turkish company. Restaurants offer the Turkish drink ayran and the McTurco, a type of kebab with chicken or beef. Turkish locations also serve onion rings, the Mega Mac (known as the Double Big Mac) and the Kofteburger, with a spiced mincemeat patty. In 2021, they begin to offer Milli Burger (Translates to "National Burger") to promote the UEFA Euro 2020.

=== Ukraine ===
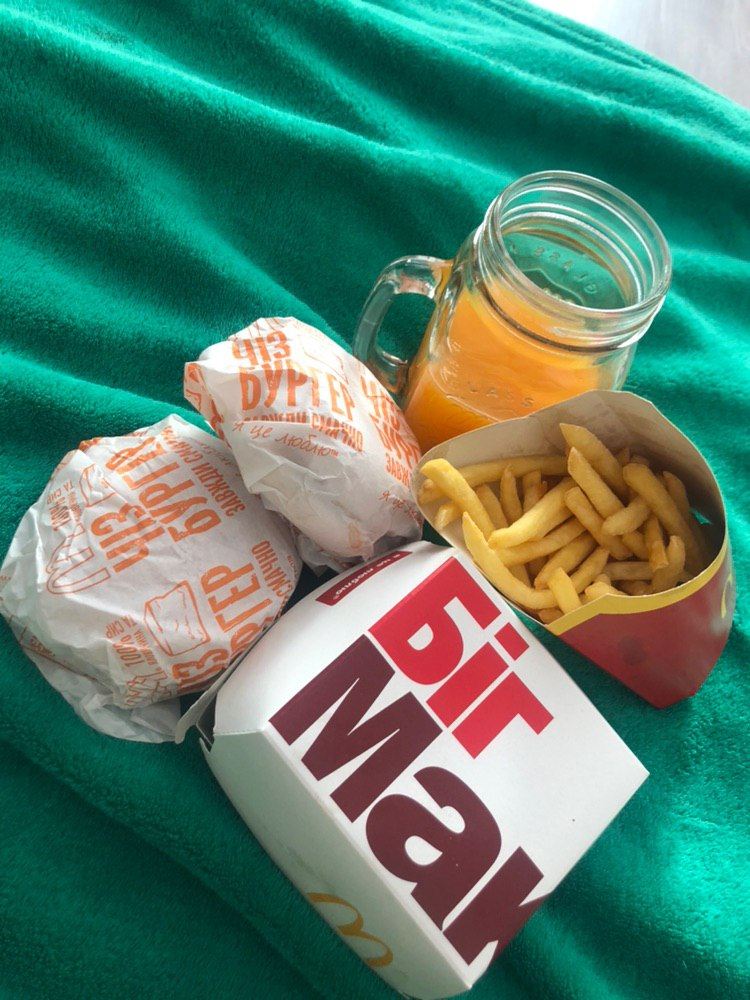
A Big Mac in Ukraine

Ukraine features the McLavash sandwich on its menus in the southern part of the country, which is served in flatbread. It has two spicy beef patties, some greens, onion and tomato. The McLavash is also served in some other nearby countries.

=== United Kingdom and Ireland ===
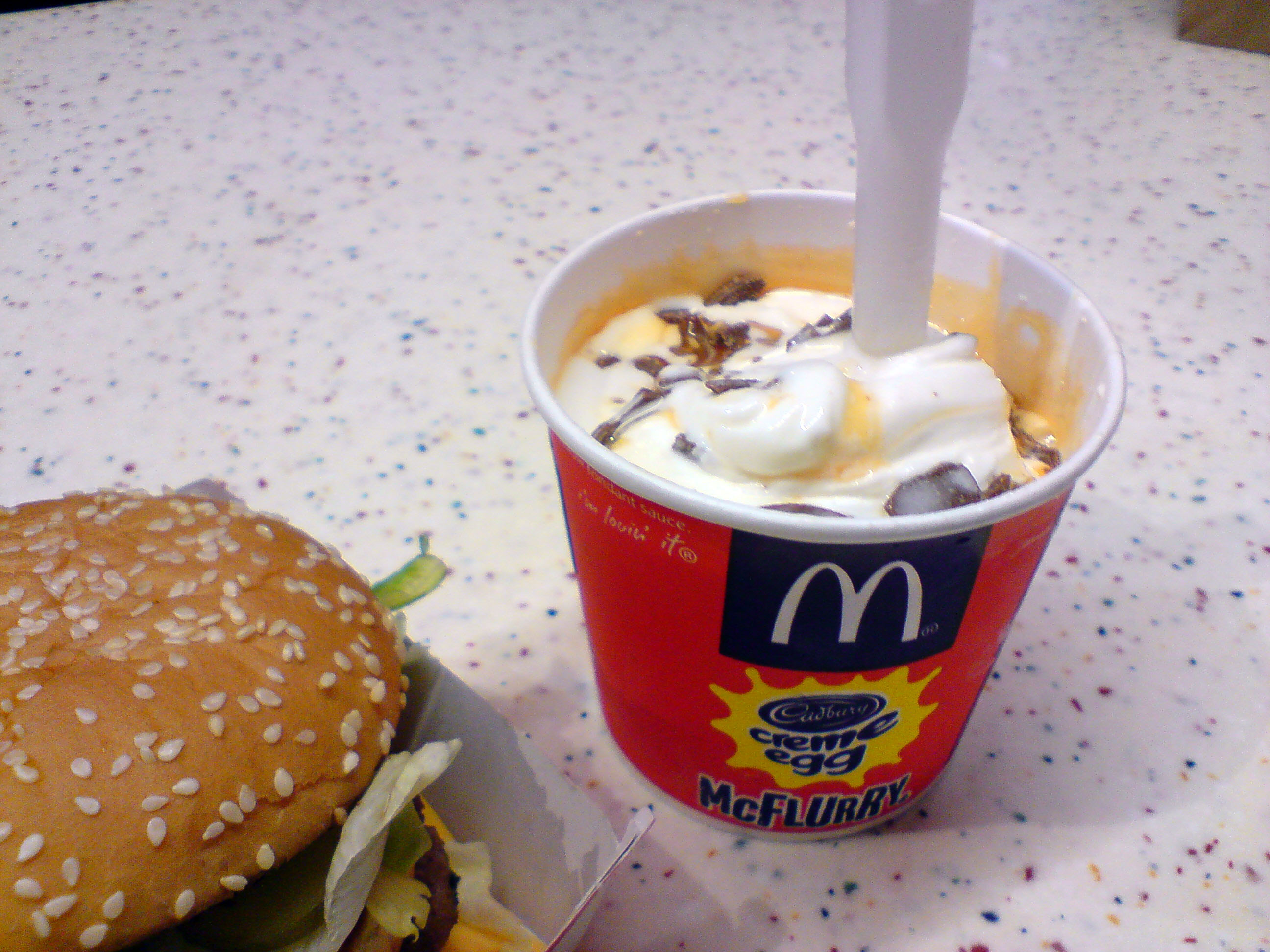
A Creme Egg McFlurry

In June 2011, Deli Choices, a line of sandwich rolls with fillings, was released in the UK. Curry flavoured sauce is available for McNuggets in British and Irish restaurants. From 2003 to 2005, menus included the Quorn Premiere, a vegetarian burger with sweet chilli sauce, light Hellmann's mayonnaise, tomato, and lettuce in a focaccia bun. In 2015, McDonald's released a limited edition burger in the Republic of Ireland called the McMór. In 2016, this burger was brought back for six weeks. It features Ballymaloe Relish, Charleville cheddar and a potato bun. In 2016, McDonald's launched the brand new BBQ Smokehouse Range of burgers. The two burgers that were launched contained chicken and beef with bacon, cheese and BBQ Sauce.

Irn-bru is available as a drink choice in McDonald's in Scotland only.

Past promotional items have included the Apple Pie Sundae, Mozzarella Dippers, Cheese Melt Dippers, the Summer Chorizo Supreme, BBQ Chicken Premiere with Bacon, the 1955 burger, Apple and Blackberry Pie and the Festive Pie, with mincemeat and custard. A series of burgers intending to represent various American locales has been released under the Great Taste of America range. These burgers have represented New York City, Chicago, Las Vegas, Texas, Arizona, Miami, California and New Orleans. Not all of these burgers resemble their respective local cuisines. British and Irish McDonald's also released a series of burgers representing several different countries. These have included Australia, South Africa, Canada and Mexico. Several Summer and Winter menus have been launched. Also, McDonald's has launched several kinds of McFlurrys over the years, such as Cornetto, Cadbury brands like Dairy Milk (which is available all year around) and the Creme Egg, which is only available around Easter.

In 2019, McDonald's released a limited-time edition of the Big Mac called the Grand Big Mac Bacon, which is essentially a larger Big Mac with added bacon. The Grand Big Mac Bacon contain around 379 Calories, and its updated price in Mcdonald's UK for 2024 is £6.59.

McDonald's UK also offered a range of premium burgers known as the Signature Collection, consisting of three burgers: The Classic, The Spicy and The BBQ. Each comes with a thicker patty made from higher quality beef which takes longer to cook and is served on a brioche bun. These were withdrawn in September 2019.

Between December 2020 and February 2021, McDonald's UK offered for sale Katsu Curry Chicken McNuggets. These consisted of Chicken McNuggets with a coating of Japanese-style panko breadcrumbs. These were available in six-, nine- and 20-piece sets and were served with a side of Sweet Curry Sauce.

In 2022 and 2023, McDonald's UK offered for sale Halloumi Fries. These consisted of halloumi cheese sticks, battered and fried.

McDonald's UK launched a loyalty programme under the name MyMcDonald's Rewards, in August 2022, within its existing app. This scheme allows adherents to collect points on purchased products and exchange them for products

== North America ==
=== Canada ===
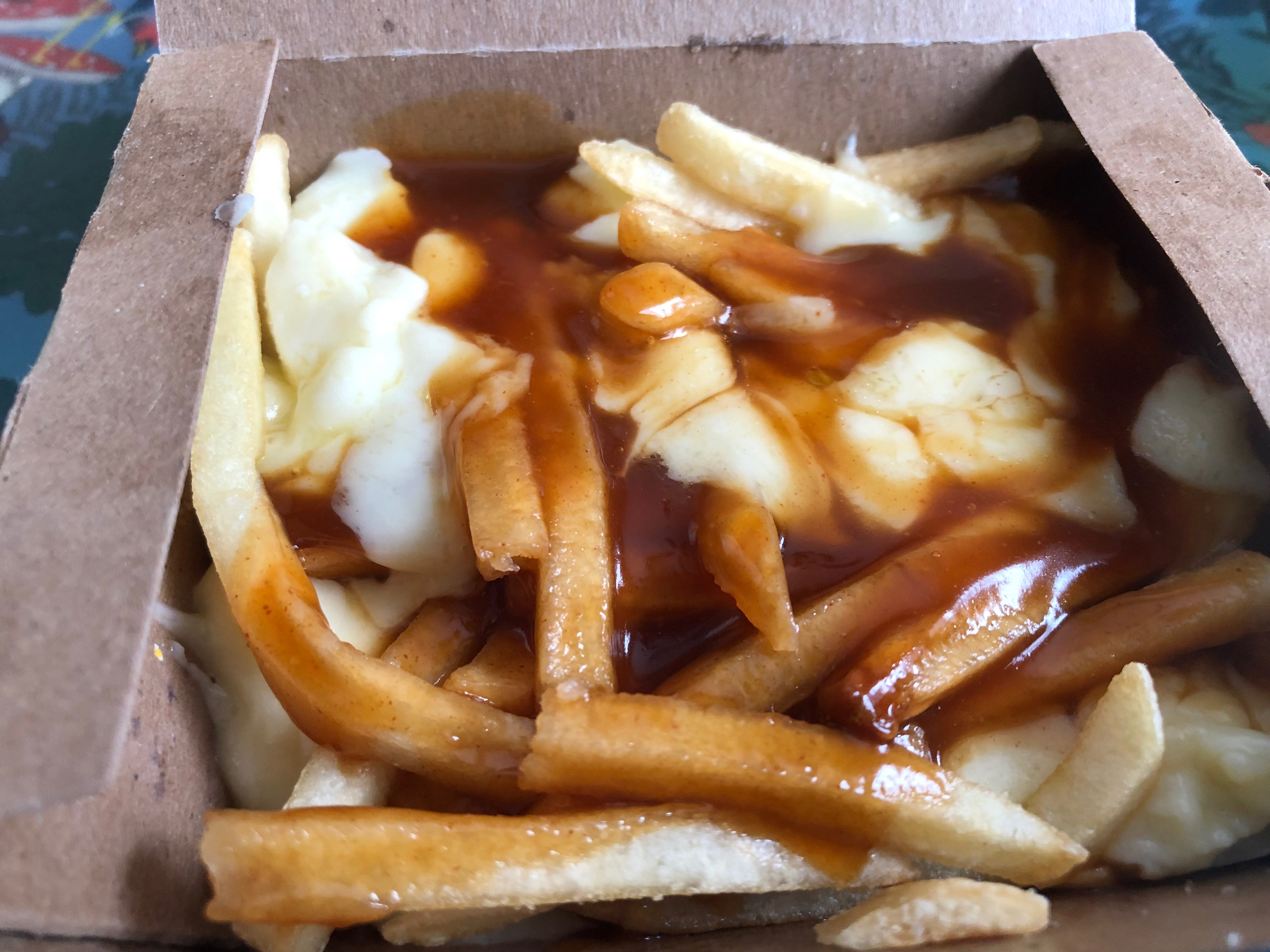
Poutine

French fries may be substituted with McDonald's version of poutine. Previously, McDonald's poutine was available widely only in Francophone Canada (Quebec and parts of New Brunswick) and available elsewhere on a more limited basis; however, in December 2013, McDonald's formally announced the nationwide availability of poutine at all of its Canadian restaurants due to popular demand. In Quebec, they also serve a variant of poutine with crispy chicken and buffalo sauce, offered in a regular or in a large size. Quebec also saw the release of the limited-time 1967 Burger, commemorating Canada's first McDonald's franchise. Deli Choices were introduced throughout Canada in 2006 but were later discontinued. As in the United States, the McRib periodically appears on the menu for limited runs. The crispy chicken patty used in the McChicken sandwich sold in Canada uses both white and dark meat – it is essentially the same size and taste as the original McChicken that first appeared in the US in 1980.

Seasonal items previously available in McDonald's in Canada include the McLobster, a lobster roll, available in the Maritime Provinces, called McHomard in French. Regionally a blueberry-shortbread McFlurry is also available. Discontinued items in Canadian McDonald's include pizzas, including a calzone-style "McPizza", and the McMini, miniature sandwiches with grilled or crispy chicken. Flavours include Pesto Chicken (later replaced by Zesty Mango) and Spicy Thai. The McFlurry originated in New Brunswick.

=== Mexico ===
Mexican McDonald's locations do not serve fish, except during Lent. Special items at these locations have included the Flaming Hot Doritos Quarter Pounder and the BBQ Double Burger. For breakfast, Mexican McDonald's locations serve the McMollete, which is made on an English muffin spread with beans, topped with a slice of melted cheese and pico de gallo. Mexican locations also serve a version of the McSkillet burrito known as the "McBurrito".

=== United States ===
Hawaii locations offer saimin on their regular menu, and include Spam, Portuguese sausage and rice as a breakfast option. Pineapple and taro pies, as regularly sold in some Asian countries, have been occasionally offered on the regular McDonald's menu, along with haupia pies; pineapple is also sometimes available as a topping on burgers. In Waikiki locations, small trays of pineapple can be ordered as a side dish. Except for saimin, Hawaiian and selected Asian specialty items can also be found in McDonald's in the US territories of Guam and the Northern Mariana Islands. During Easter time, Hawaii, Guam and the CNMI all feature the Double Filet-O-Fish meal due to having a heavy concentration of Catholics (mostly people who immigrated from the Philippines) in that region.

==== Puerto Rico ====
Unlike Mexico, several Puerto Rican McDonald's restaurants serve fish products, although it is not listed on McDonald's Puerto Rico's official website. Puerto Rican restaurants also serve the McCriollo (with eggs and cheese) for breakfast. Criollo is a Puerto Rican bread, like a baguette, but bigger and softer. Basically, the McCriollo is a sandwich with ham, cheese, and egg on a Criollo roll.

=== Costa Rica ===
Costa Rica was one of the first countries to have McCafe. McDonald's Costa Rica also sells fried chicken, McPinto (gallo pinto is the national breakfast which includes rice and beans, sour cream, eggs, sausage, tortilla). They also sell the Mcnifica (burger with tomato and lettuce) and la hamburguesa tica (with a special sauce typical of Costa Rica, salsa lizano), while McFlurry is usually made with local chocolates and McShakes come in local fruit flavors like Passion Fruit.

=== Dominican Republic ===
In the Dominican Republic, McDonald's sells the same food as the US and Canada, but Chicken McNuggets are instead called the "McDo". It sells hamburgers, fries, nuggets (chicken flavored), and soda.

== Oceania ==
=== Australia ===
A popular Australian McDonald's menu item is the McOz Burger. Previous products have included: Shaker Fries, a seasonal product similar to Japan's Shaka Shaka Chicken, and burger variants ranging across Cheeseburger, Big Mac and Spicy; the BLT; the McBeefsteak, promoted by country music singer Lee Kernaghan; the Big Kahuna Burger, served with pineapple; the Romano Burger, a chicken patty with Italian sauce and mozzarella served on an herbed focaccia bun; the Tandoori Burger, a chicken patty with lettuce and mint yogurt sauce served on flatbread; and a Chive Omelette Roll.

Recent products have included: Chicken McBites, Classic Angus and Aussie BBQ Angus burgers, and Vegemite shaker fries.

Every so often (typically once a year) the McOz is sold for a limited time. The McOz is a quarter-pounder burger with lettuce, tomato, cheese, mustard, ketchup and the so-called Australian ingredients of beetroot and cooked onion served on a sesame seed bun.

The El Maco burger, offered in other markets, was released for a limited time offer on 27 November 2019. These burgers launch alongside Mozzarella Sticks served with El Maco Salsa and an El Maco variant Shaker Fries.

==== Queensland ====
For a limited time only, as part of a partnership between the National Rugby League (NRL) club the Brisbane Broncos and Ronald McDonald House South East Queensland, McDonald's released a new limited-edition burger known as the Broncos Burger. However, it was only available at McDonald's restaurants in Brisbane. Satirical news outlets jokingly claimed that the burger was revamped to include horse meat, as the term "bronco" refers to a bucking horse, and the Brisbane Broncos' logo features a horse. However, the burger was actually made of beef, as horse meat is not only not sold at McDonald's, but is also very rarely sold in Australia.

==== South Australia ====
Originally, the limited-edition Southern Fried Chicken pieces at McDonald's in Australia were only available in South Australia. However, the item was eventually released in other states and territories.

=== Fiji ===
The McDonald's menu in Fiji is similar to that of McDonald's in Australia and New Zealand. Residents of all three countries also colloquially refer to the restaurant as "Macca's".

The Brekkie Burger and the McFeast, for example, are both on the McDonald's menu in Fiji, as well as in Australia and New Zealand.

Menu items exclusive to Fiji include the ELT McMuffin, Hot & Spicy Chicken, potato pancakes, the Scrambled Egg McMuffin and sweet potato fries.

Additionally, the Big Breakfast, which does not exist in Australia or New Zealand, exists in Fiji. The Fijian variant, however, consists of a hash brown, scrambled eggs and a toasted McMuffin.

=== New Zealand ===
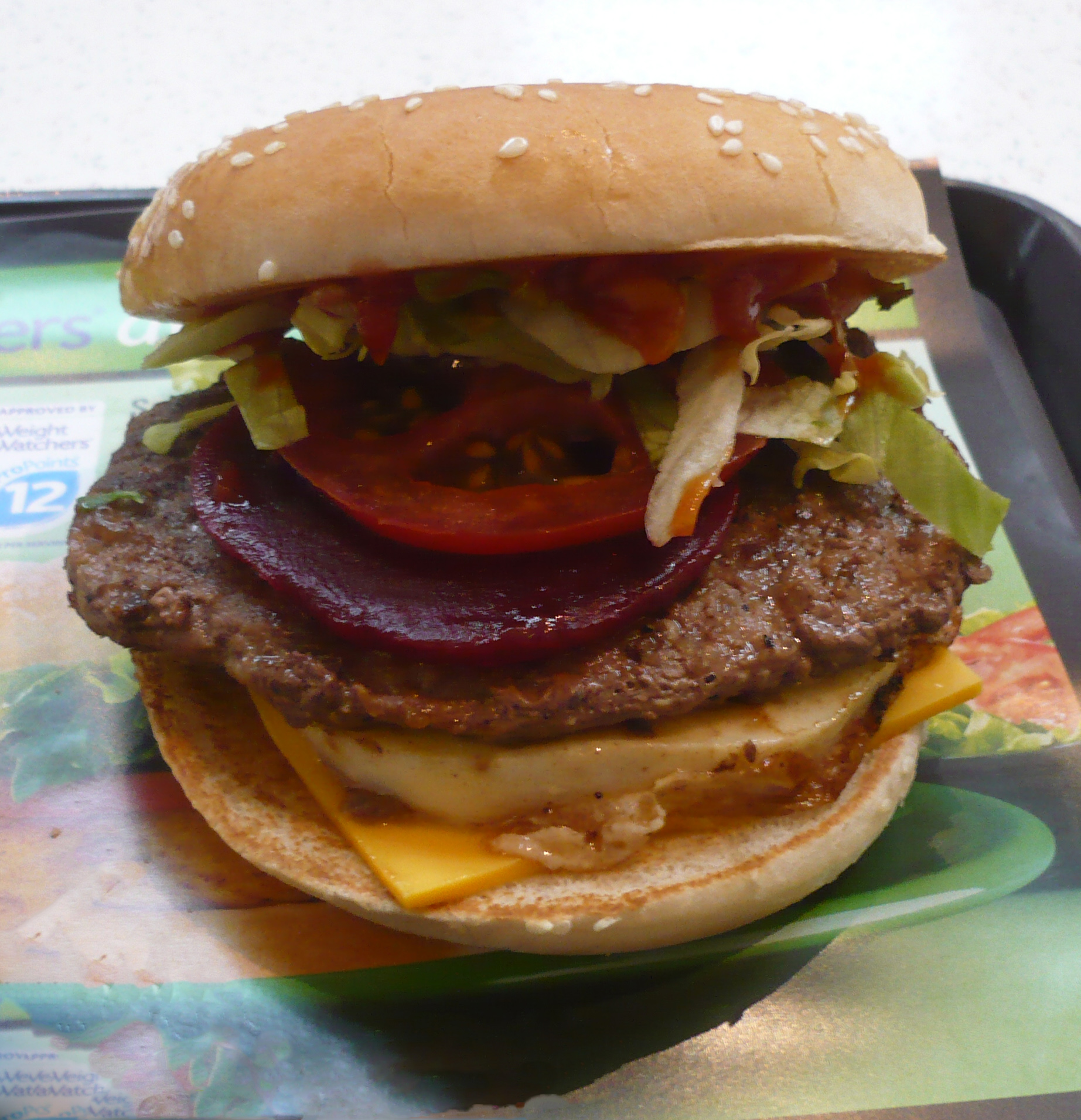
Kiwiburger

Many McDonald's menu items in New Zealand are similar to those in Australia. Some unique items include the Kiwiburger, a beef patty with McMuffin egg, tomato, lettuce, cheese, onion, beetroot, ketchup, and mustard. In 2011, a special "Kiwi Menu" was featured to promote the country's hosting of the 2011 Rugby World Cup.

In April 2012, McDonald's re-released the El Maco, a variant of the product of the same name offered in other markets, such as Scandinavia. El Maco had previously been sold in New Zealand in the early 1990s.

In 1996, the New Zealand affiliate bought out failing local fast food chain Georgie Pie, which based itself around Australian and New Zealand meat pies. McDonald's trialed a partial relaunch of the Georgie Pie brand in May 2013 with one pie flavor sold through eleven of its restaurants. In October 2013, the affiliate announced it would expand the sale of Georgie Pie to 107 of its 161 restaurants by the end of 2013. As of January 2017, two pie flavors are available: Steak Mince 'n' Cheese and Bacon 'n' Egg. The Georgie Pie range was discontinued in late 2020.

In 2023, McDonald's released BBQ Bandit Burger for a limited time, The Burger was made to catering to local tastes to understand the preferences of their customer base.

== South America ==
=== Argentina ===
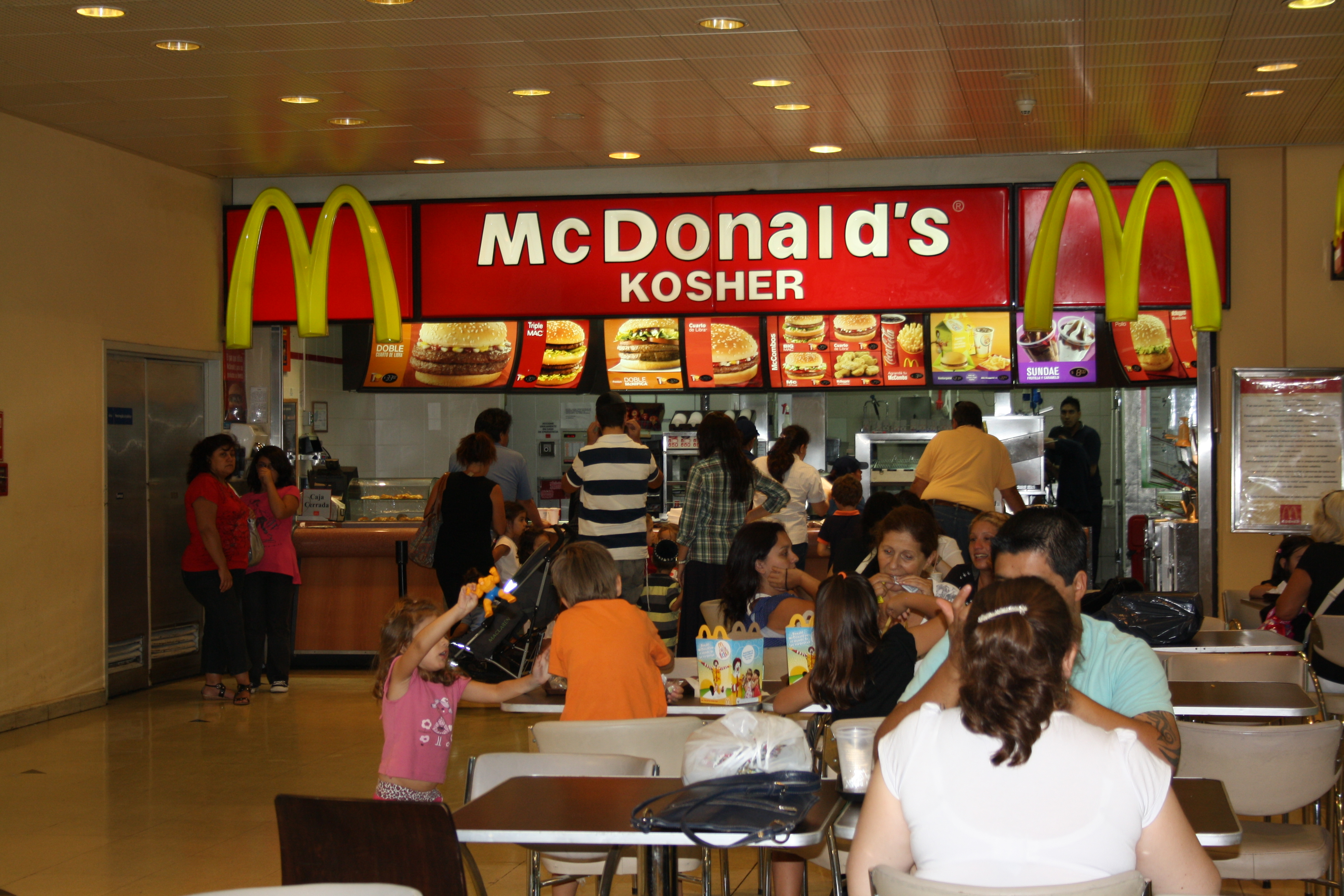
Kosher McDonald's in Buenos Aires, Argentina

McDonald's Argentina serves Big Tasty Angus Burger, made with premium Argentinean Angus Beef. Argentina is the only country besides Israel in which McDonald's has full kosher locations. By 2010, these are the only places in the world where McDonald's burgers are barbecued on charcoal rather than fried.

=== Brazil ===
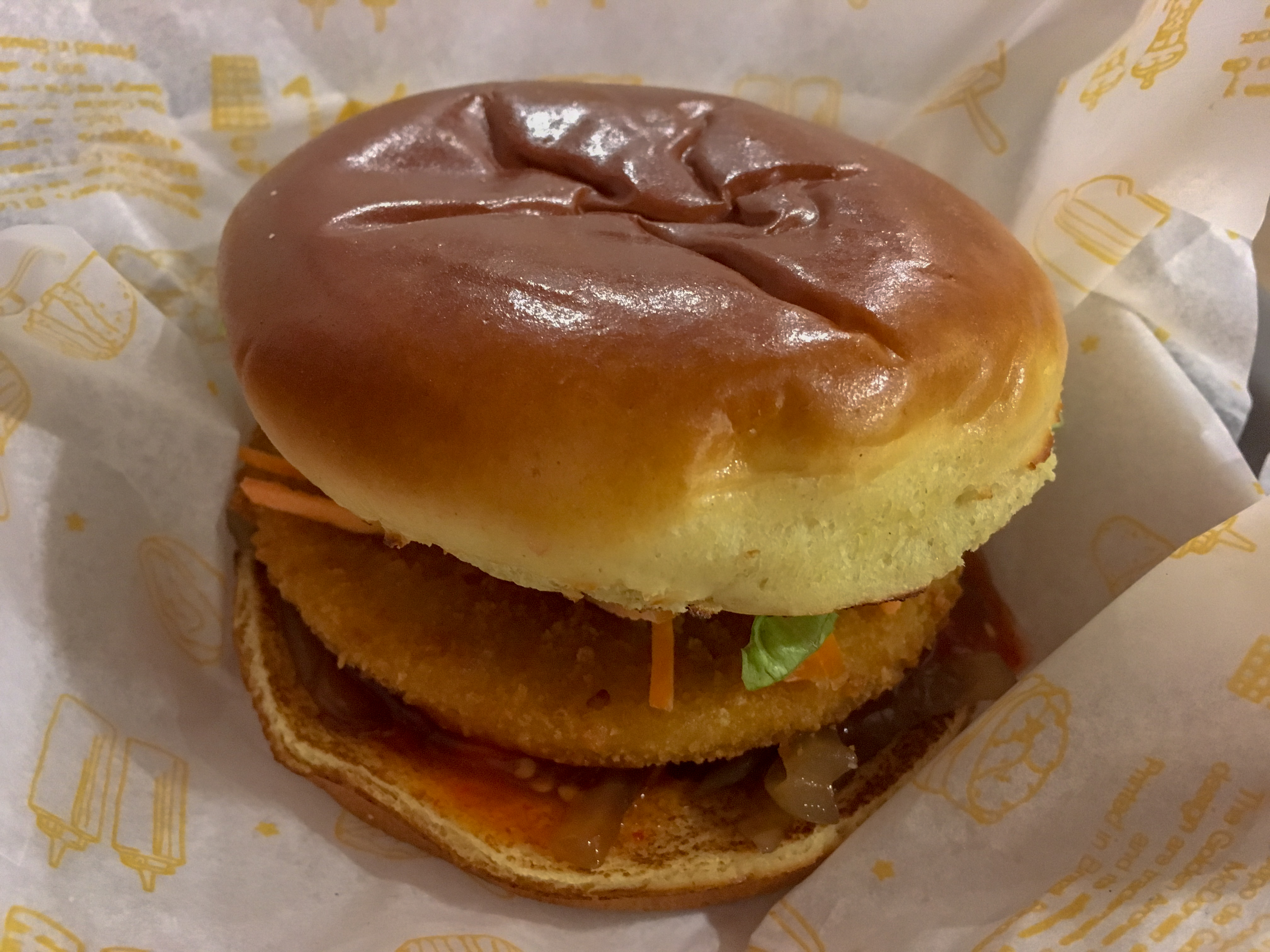
A McVeggie in Brazil

In Brazil, McDonald's offers the Cheddar McMelt, a beef burger with creamy cheddar cheese and grilled onions, flavored with soy sauce on a whole-wheat bun. Banana-flavored pies are served in Brazilian McDonald's.

A vegetarian burger started being available, on a trial basis, on 8 November 2018. This followed a trial of a vegan burger in October/November 2017.

The McFish (Portuguese for Filet-O-Fish) was discontinued in late 2019.

The McFish was brought back on the menu for a limited time on February 25, 2025, alongside a limited edition serving of potato wedges.

=== Chile ===
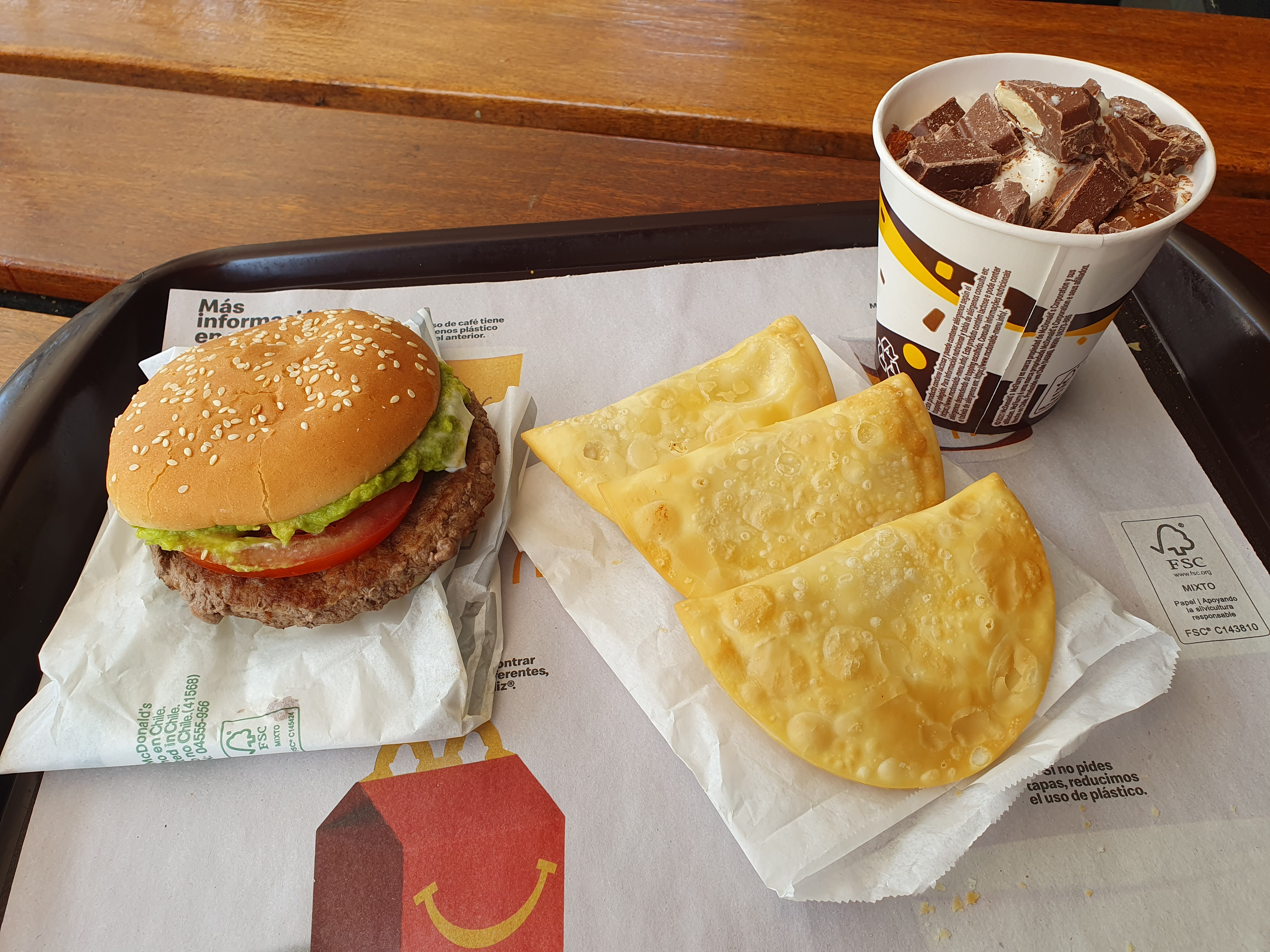
Hamburguesa Italiana (left), cheese empanadas and McFlurry Sahne Nuss

In Chile, cheese empanadas are sold at all McDonald's locations as side dishes.

In 2010, to celebrate the 200th anniversary of Chilean independence. McDonald's offered Combo Bicentenario, a beef burger with pebre, a Chilean condiment made of coriander, chopped onion, olive oil, garlic and ground spicy chili pepper, and merkén, a smoked chili pepper. To celebrate the National Day in 2013, the restaurant served empanadas de pino (stuffed with beef, olives, onions, raisins, and boiled eggs) as special side dishes.

By the 2010s, customers could add avocado paste to any sandwich, other than the McPalta (Chilean Spanish for McAvocado), whose basis is avocado paste along burger as both discontinued Cuarto Palta (Avocado Quarter Pounder) and McWrap Palta with Fuze Tea, sliced fried chicken with lettuce, tomatoes and purple onion in a tortilla. Instead, by 2023, the company offers Hamburguesa Italiana, a beef burger with tomato slices, avocado and mayonnaise.

Since 2017, happy meals offer Hamburguesa Palta, a beef burger with avocado, and papas duquesas (Duchess potatoes) as side dishes.

In 2023, the company released the McFlurry Sahne Nuss, a McFlurry ice cream sundae with chocolate, manjar and strawberry sauce topped with almonds-and-chocolate bar Sahne Nuss.

For breakfast, McDonald's serves croissants, also known in Chile as Medialuna, alongside Tostado Queso Palta, grilled bread with a slice of melted cheese and avocado, and Tostado Queso Bacon, grilled bread with a slice of melted cheese and bacon. Discontinued breakfast products include local versions of two Chilean sandwiches: Barros Jarpa, whose basis is ham and molten cheese on bread, and Lomo Palta, an avocado paste along a slice pork.

For happy meals, customers can select a book instead of a toy.

=== Colombia ===
Colombian McDonald's restaurants serve the McCriollo breakfast combo, which includes a sausage patty, two traditional Colombian arepas, scrambled eggs and sweetcorn, a hashbrown, coffee, butter, and jam. The McNífica is also served here. It is similar to the Quarter Pounder with cheese. McDonald's in Colombia offers fried chicken.

=== Ecuador ===
In Ecuador, McDonald's started selling cheese empanadas, burgers with cheese sausage or guacamole, blackberry sundae and nuggets with spicy sausage in 2012 under the "Nuestros sabores" campaign, aimed at providing a more local cuisine.

=== Peru ===
In Peru, McDonald's offers ají, a spicy sauce made from peppers, as a condiment. Peruvian locations also serve Pollo Crujiente ("crunchy chicken"), which is fried chicken served in a bucket, and Inca Kola. McDonald's also offers "Peruvian Foods" and blackberry Sundae.

=== Venezuela ===
In Venezuela, McDonald's offers arepas, empanadas for breakfast. Venezuelan locations have also served fried yuca sticks.

== See also ==
- McDelivery
- Mcdvoice
