= List of cheese dishes =

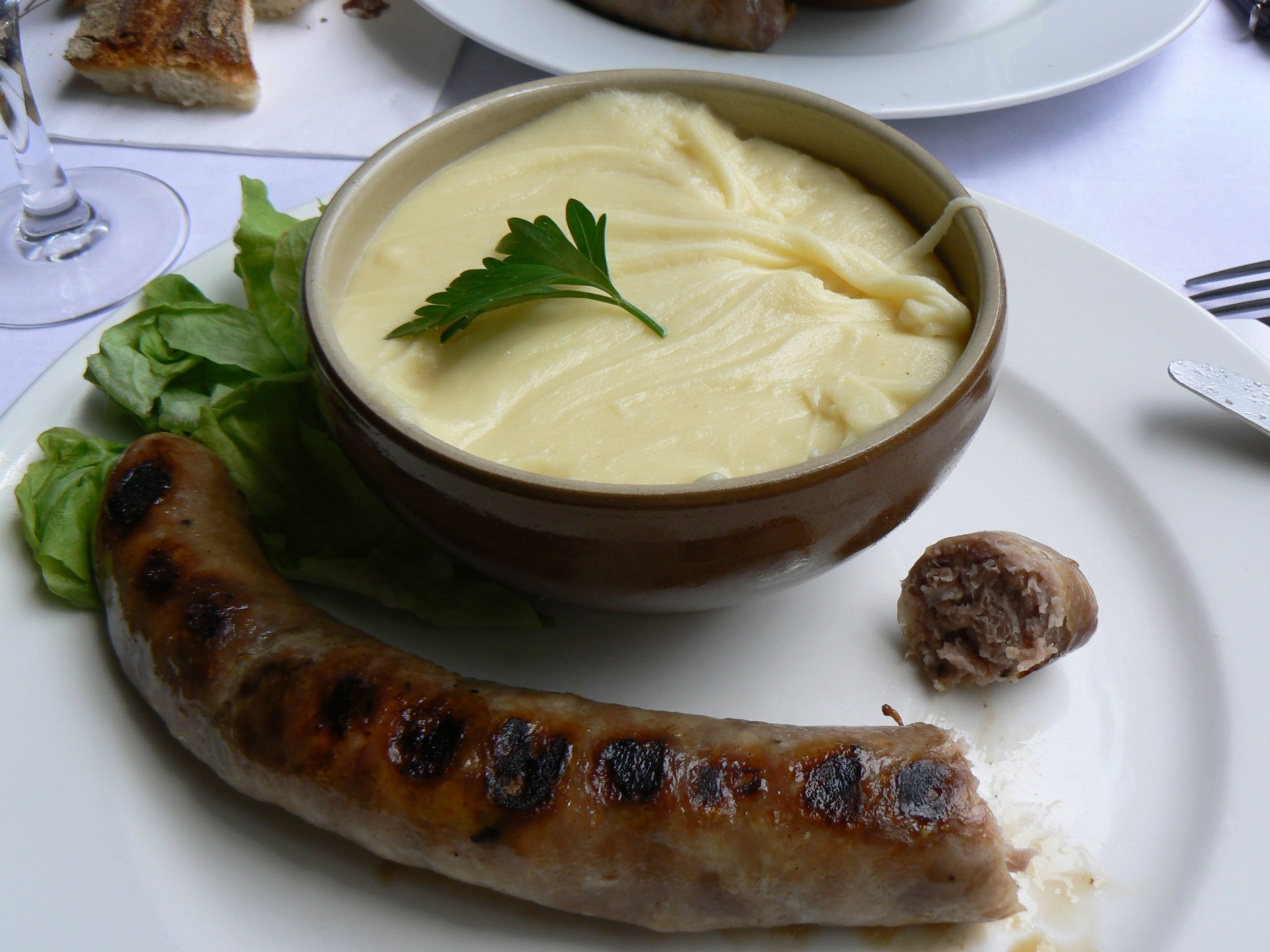
Aligot, a regional French dish made from melted cheese blended into mashed potatoes, often with some garlic

This is a list of notable cheese dishes in which cheese is used as a primary ingredient or as a significant component of a dish or a food. Cheese is a food derived from milk that is produced in a wide range of flavors, textures, and forms by coagulation of the milk protein casein. It comprises proteins and fat from milk, usually the milk of cows, buffalo, goats, or sheep.

== Cheese dishes and foods ==
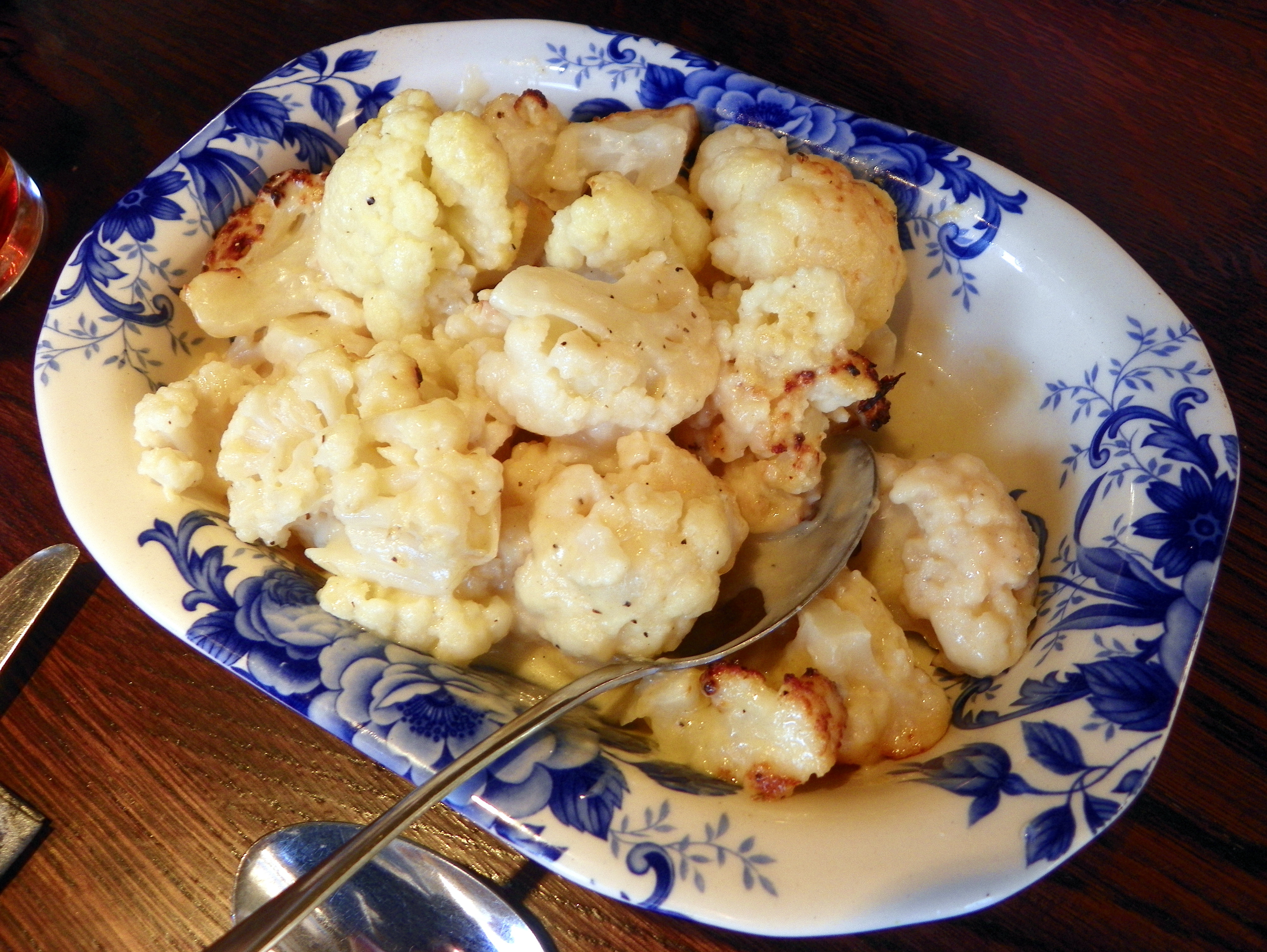
Cauliflower cheese

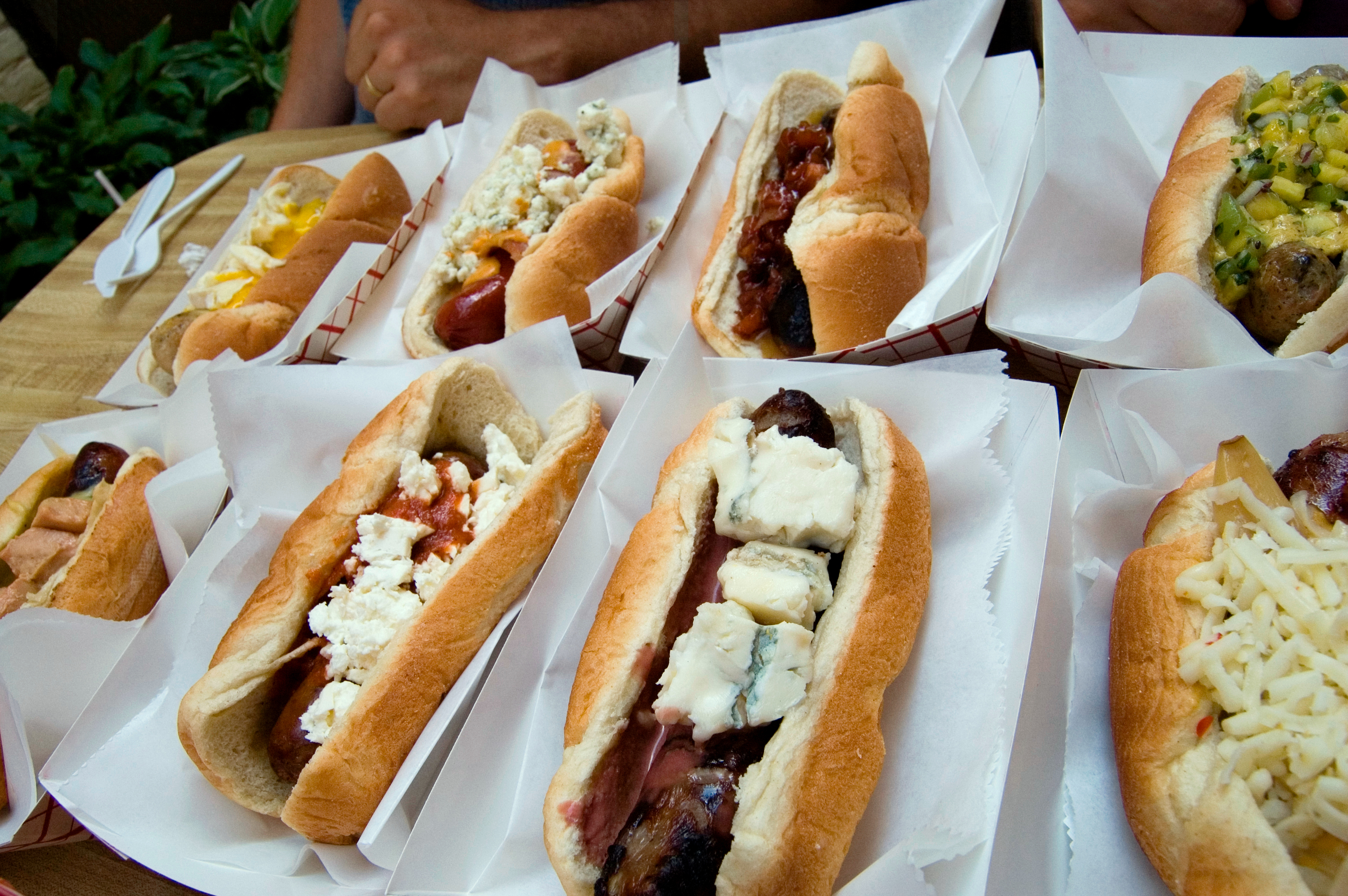
A selection of cheese dogs

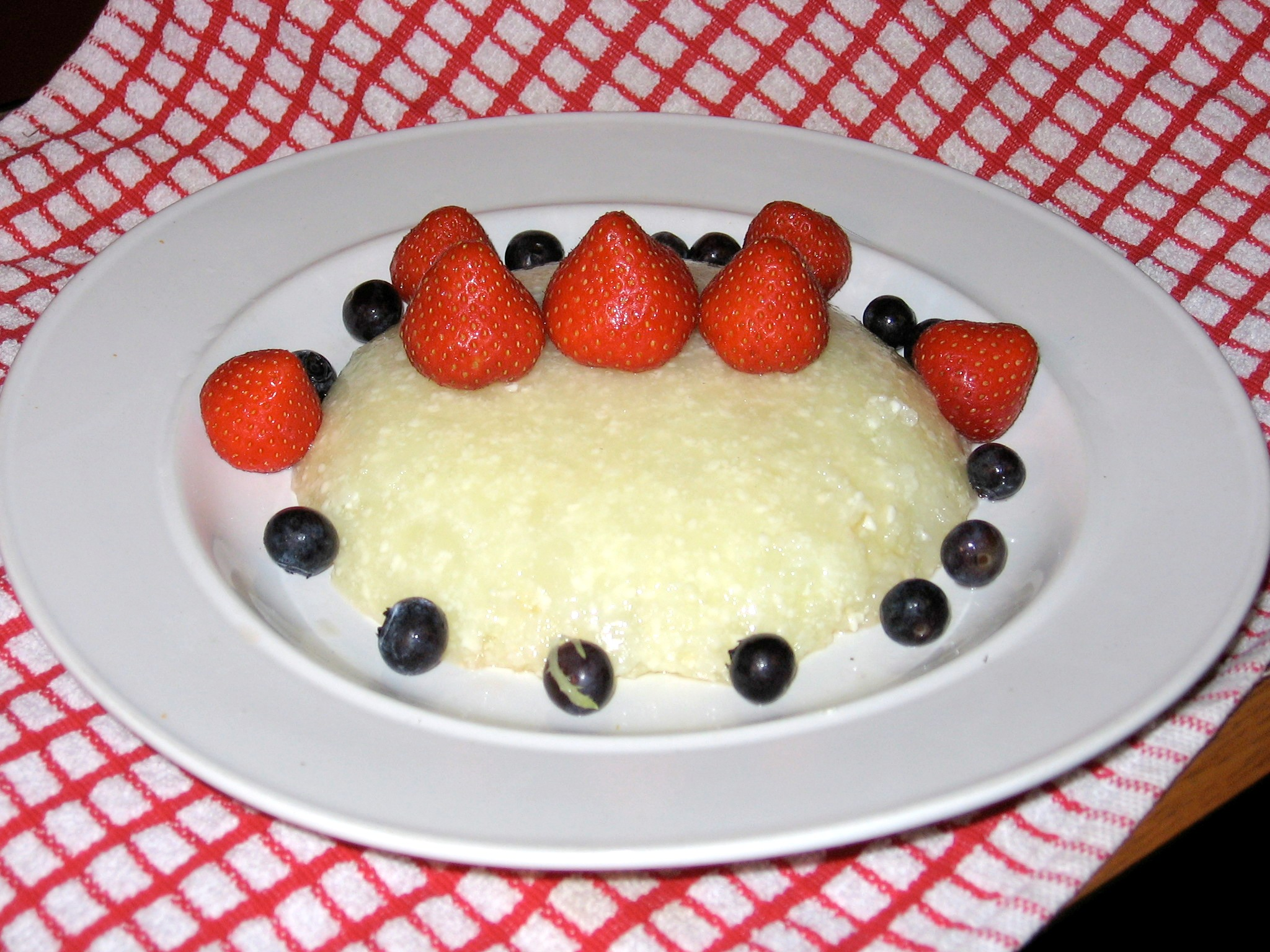
Cheese pudding

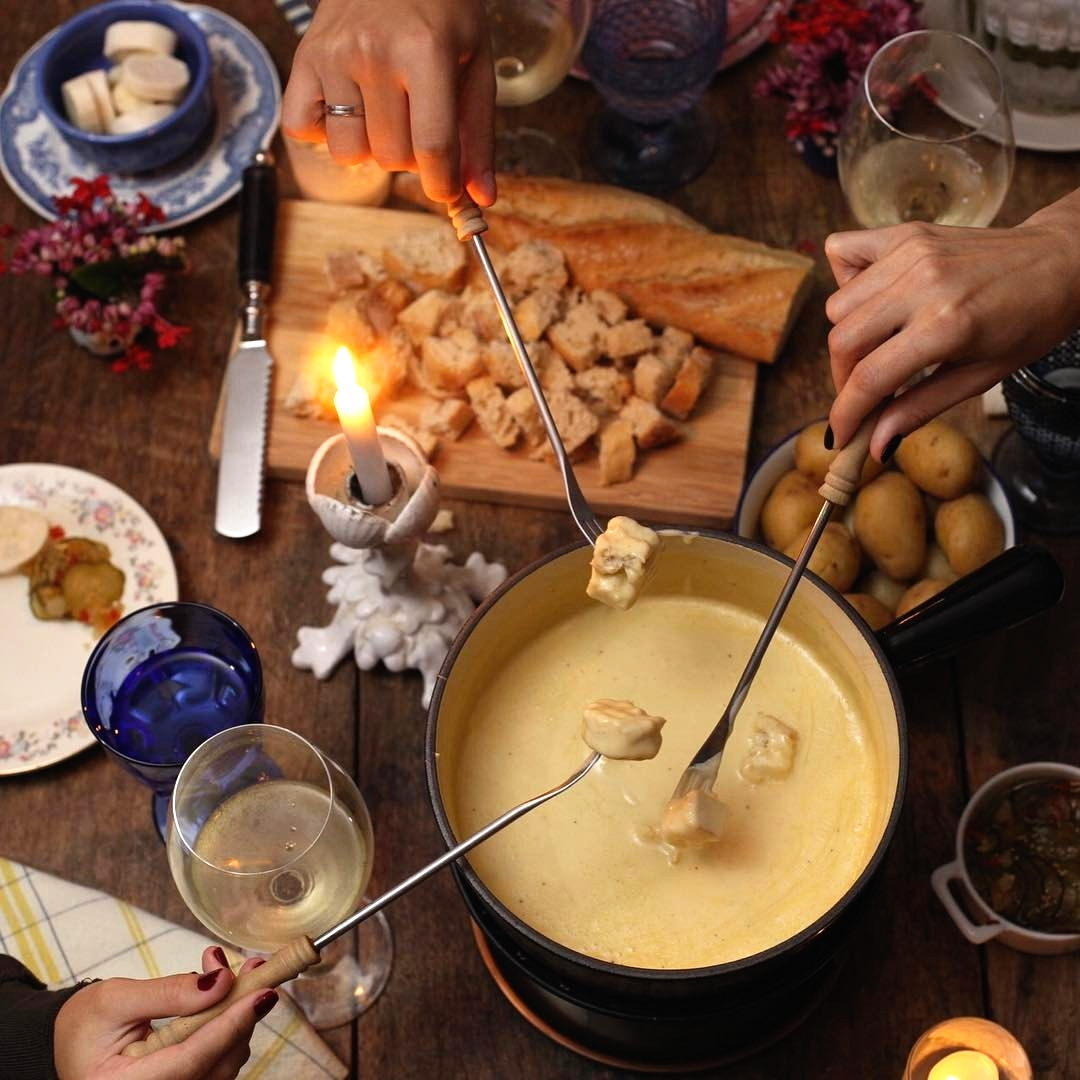
Dipping a cheese fondue with long-stemmed forks

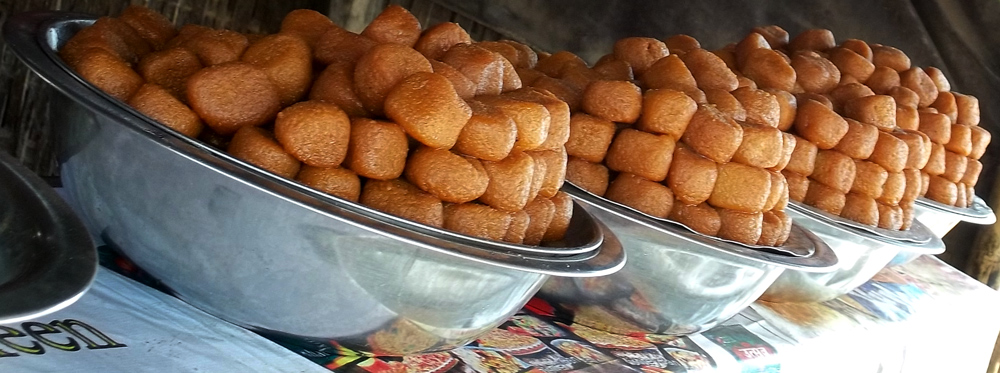
Chhena Gaja from Pahala, Orissa

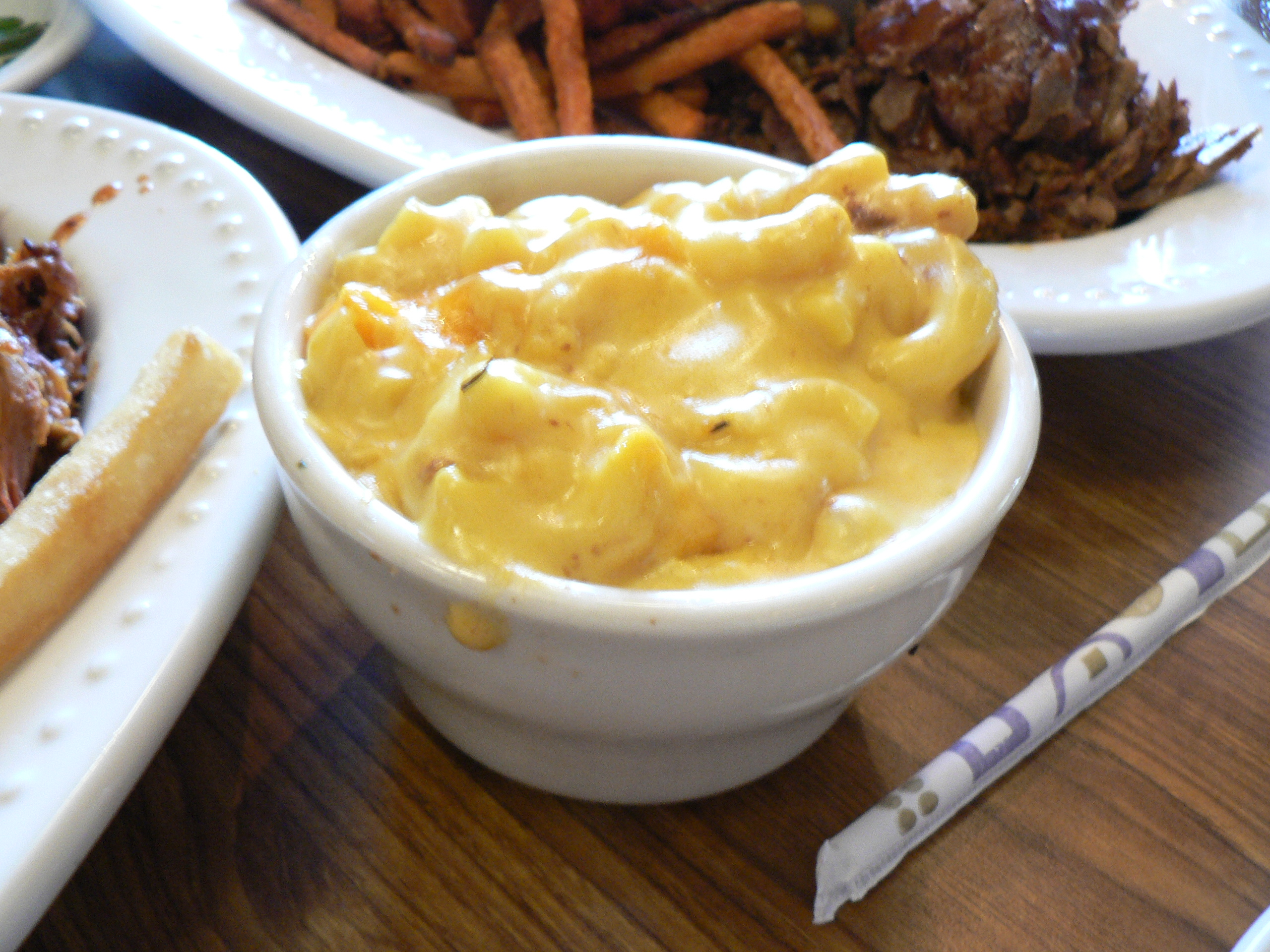
A side dish of macaroni and cheese

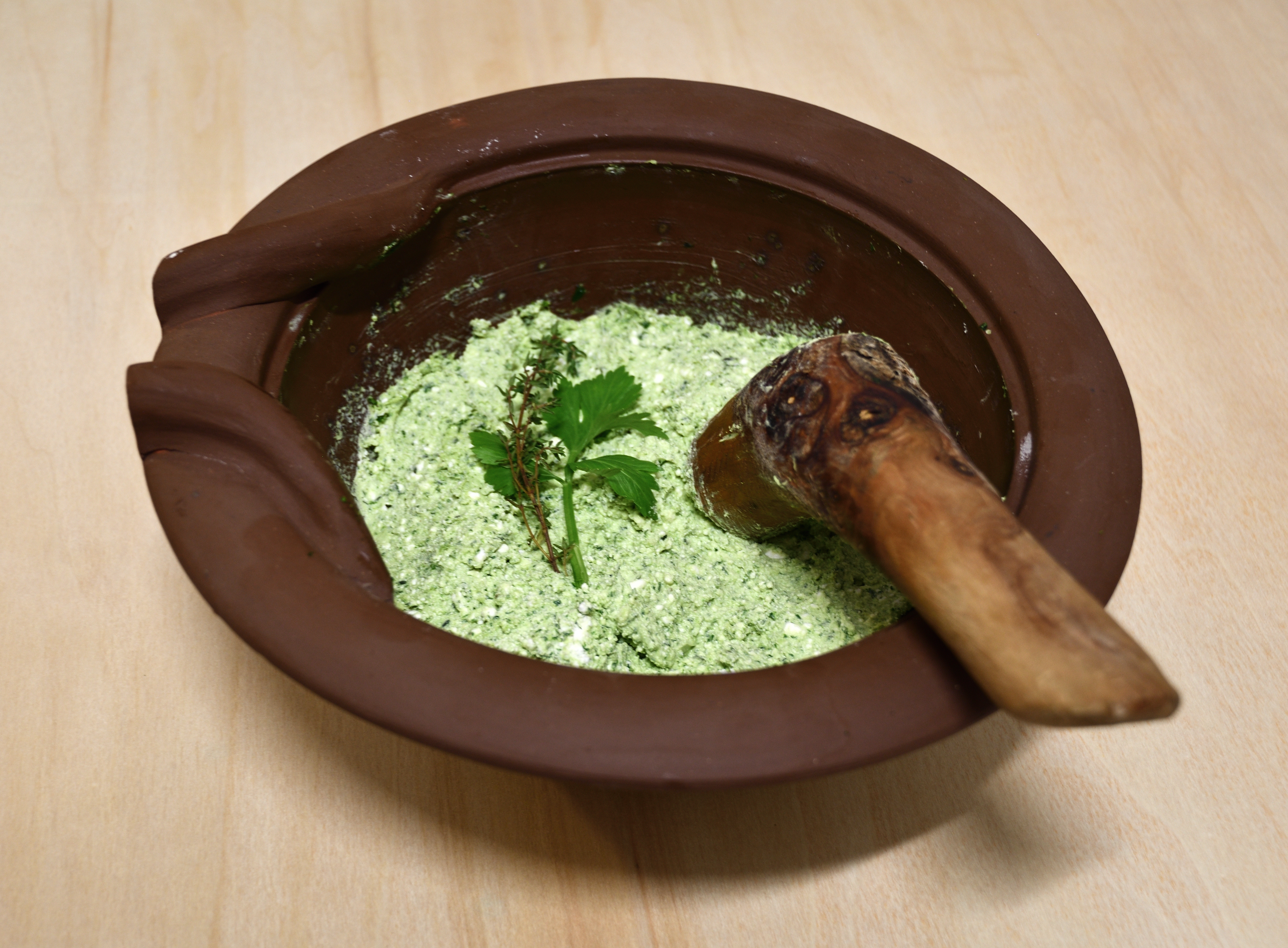
Moretum is a type of herb cheese spread that the Ancient Romans ate with bread.

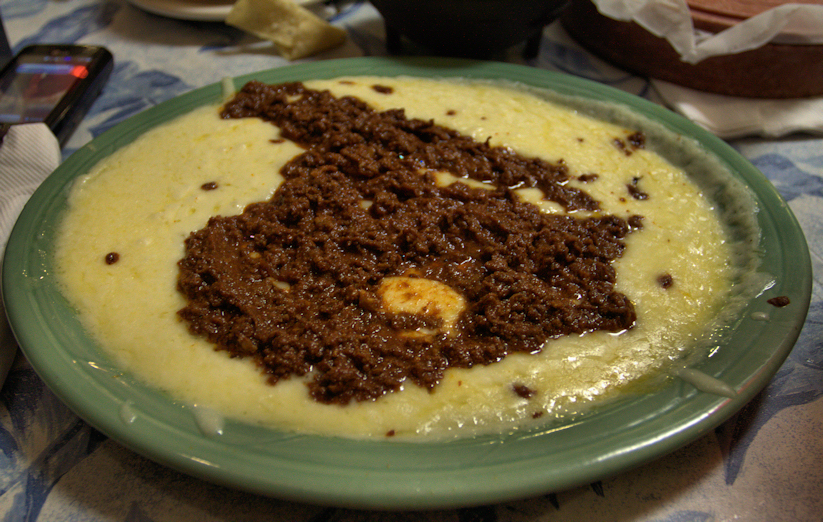
Queso flameado prepared with Oaxaca cheese and topped with chorizo sausage

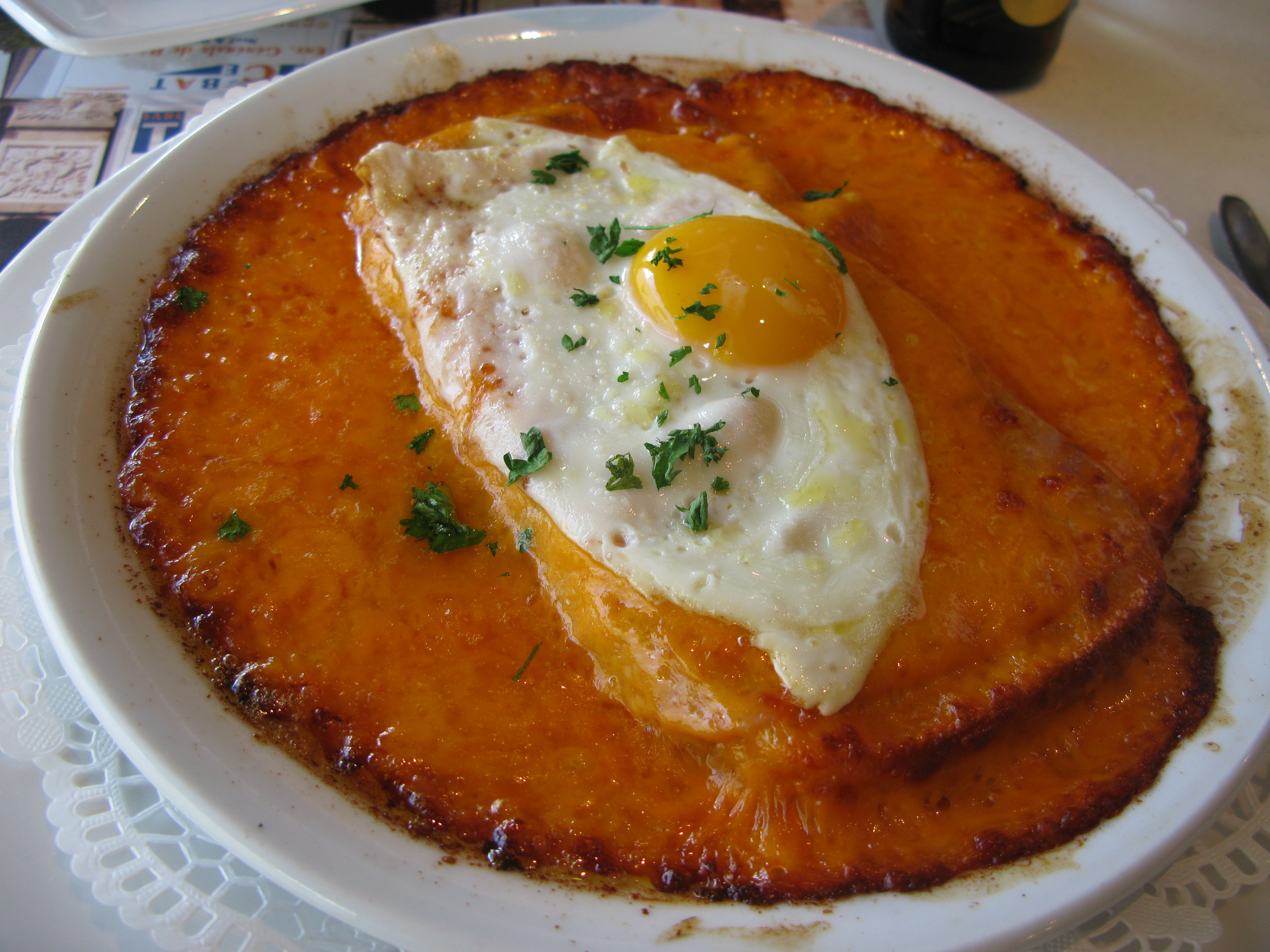
Welsh rarebit made with a savory sauce of melted cheese and other ingredients and served hot on bread or in a chafing dish for dipping

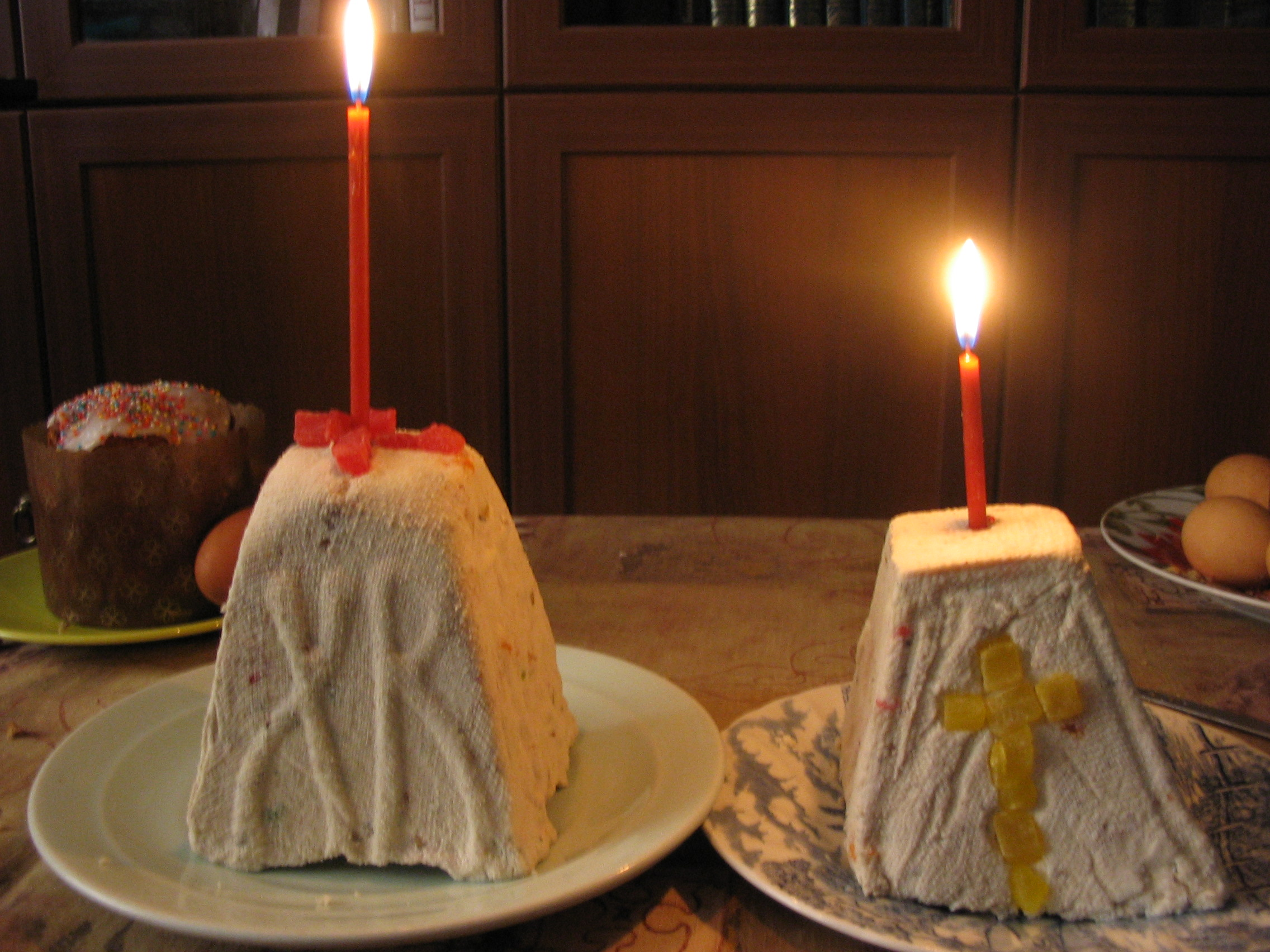
Paskha made of curd cheese

- Aligot – French cheese and potato dish
- Almogrote – Spread of Canary Islands cuisine
- Älplermagronen – Swiss dish of pasta and potatoes, with cream, cheese and onions
- Arizona cheese crisp – Cheese dish
- Bacon, egg and cheese sandwich – Breakfast sandwich
- Bagel and cream cheese – Common food pairing in American cuisine
- Beer cheese (spread) – Cheese spread containing beer
- Beer soup – Soup made from a beer-based roux
- Bryndzové halušky – Traditional Slovak dish
- Caldo de queso – Traditional Mexican cheese soup
- California cheese maki – Type of sushi
- Caprese salad – Italian salad
- Carrozza (sandwich) – Italian dish
- Caşcaval pane – European dish: Eastern Europe
- Cauliflower cheese – English dish
- Cervelle de canut – French cheese spread
- Cheese ball (hors d'oeuvre) – American hors d'oeuvre
- Cheddar sauce – British sauce made with cheddar cheese
- Cheese and crackers – Dish, often served with wine, fruit, or meat
- Cheese and pickle sandwich – British sandwich
- Cheese bun
- Cheese dog – Hot dog with cheese filling
- Cheese dream – British dish of melted cheese
- Cheese fries – Fast-food dish of fries and cheese
- Cheese maki – Type of sushi
- Cheese spread – Soft and spreadable cheese product
- Cheese toastie – Hot melted cheese sandwich
- Cheese on toast – British dish of melted cheese
- Cheese pudding – Pudding dish made with cheese
- Cheese puffs – Puffed corn snack
- Cheese roll – New Zealand snack food
- Cheese sandwich – Sandwich with cheese as the main ingredient
- Cheese sauce – Sauce made with cheese
- Cheese slaw – Australian side dish
- Cheeseburger – Hamburger topped with cheese
- Cheesecake – Cheese-based dessert
- Cheesesteak – Sandwich
- Cheese tteokbokki – Korean spicy rice cake dish
- Chef salad – American salad
- Chèvre chaud – French dish, consisting of Chèvre cheese served hot
- Chhena Gaja – Odia sweet dish
- Chhena jalebi – Indian dessert
- Chhena Jhili – Odia sweet dish
- Chhena kheeri – Sweet dish originally from Odisha, India
- Chhena Poda – Cheese dessert from Odisha, India
- Chicken parmesan – Italian-American dish
- Chile con queso – Side dish of melted processed cheese and chili peppers
- Cocoloşi – Romanian dish of grilled corn porridge
- Cordon bleu – Meat and cheese dish
- Croque-monsieur – French hot sandwich with ham and cheese
- Curd snack – Type of sweet dairy food made from curd cheese
- Ema datshi – Cheese and chili-based dish from Bhutan
- Fettuccine Alfredo – Creamy pasta dish with butter and cheese
- Fondue – Swiss melted cheese dish
- Frico – Italian dish
- Fried cheese – Cheese dish fried in oil
- Frito pie – American savory dish
- Fromage fort – French cheese spread
- Gibanica – Serbian dish of filo, cheese and eggs
- Gomme – Traditional Norwegian cheese preparation
  - Søst – A dairy dish similar to gomme, but added raisins, syrup and semolina. Often added to or eaten with lefse or as a dessert on its own
- Gougère – French savory pastry puff with cheese
- Grilled cheese – Hot melted cheese sandwich
- Gulab jamun – Milk-solid-based sweet from the Indian subcontinent
- Ham and cheese sandwich – Common type of sandwich
- Hauskyjza – Polish cheese dish
- Hellimli – Foodstuff: Cyprus
- Jambon – Savoury pastry snack
- Käsespätzle – Baked cheese pasta dish
- Kasseropita – Greek layered pastry food
- Keshi yena – Aruban and Curaçaoan main course dish
- Khachapuri – Georgian cheese-filled bread
- Khoya paneer – North Indian cheese dish
- Lasagne – Flat pasta and stacked pasta dishes
- Lazy varenyky – Stuffed Polish dumplings
- Lumpiang Keso - Filipino cheese sticks
- Liptauer – Central European cheese spread
- Llapingacho – Ecuadorian fried potato pancake
- Macaroni and cheese – Pasta dish
- Machas a la parmesana – Chilean seafood dish with razor clams
- Malakoff – Swiss fried cheese balls
- Masan (pastry) – Tibetan pastry made with curd cheese
- Mattar paneer – Indian cheese and peas dish
- Mazë (Albanian)
- Međimurska gibanica – Croatian dessert
- Melt sandwich – Type of hot sandwich containing cheese
- Moretum – Herb cheese spread
- Mote de queso – Colombian soup dish
- Mozzarella sticks – Fried breaded or battered mozzarella
- Nachos – Tortilla chip dish
- Obatzda – Bavarian cheese specialty
- Palak paneer – Indian vegetarian dish with cheese
- Paneer tikka – Indian cuisine
- Paneer tikka masala – Indo-British dish
- Papas chorreadas – Colombian potato and cheese dish
- Parmigiana – Italian dish of eggplant with cheese and tomato sauce
- Parmo – English take-away dish
- Paskha – East Slavic festive dish
- Pastizz – Savoury pastry from Malta
- Pizza – Italian dish
- Poulet au fromage – French chicken and cheese dish
- Poutine – Quebecois dish of french fries, cheese curds and gravy
- Provoleta – Argentinian cheese
- Quarkkäulchen – German potato pancake dish
- Queijadinha – Portuguese confection
- Queijo coalho grelhado
- Quesadilla – Mexican dish of tortillas with melted cheese
- Quesillo – Types of cheese and other foods
- Quesito – Pastry from Puerto Rico
- Queso flameado – Dish of hot melted cheese and spicy chorizo
- Raclette – Swiss dish of melted cheese
- Rasabali – Sweet dish from Odisha, India
- Rasgula – Syrupy dessert popular in South Asia
- Raviole du Dauphiné – French pasta dish
- Saganaki – Greek fried cheese dish
- Scovardă – Romanian pastry
- Smažený sýr – Czech and Slovak cheese dish
- Smoked salmon cheesecake – Cheese-based dessert
- Spanakopita – Savory spinach pie made with filo pastry
- Zagorski Štrukli / Štruklji – Type of Dish
- Supplì – Italian snack food
- Syrniki – Fried quark pancakes from Eastern European cuisine
- Tartiflette – French baked potato dish
- Tirokafteri – Greek cheese-based spread
- Tiropita – Greek layered pastry food
- Tu (cake) – Tibetan cheese cake made with yak butter
- Túró Rudi – Curd snack popular in Hungary
- Túrós csusza – Hungarian cheese and pasta dish
- Urnebes – Serbian dish
- Vatrushka – Eastern European pastry
- Velveeta Shells & Cheese – Brand name stovetop pasta shells and cheese product
- Vyprážaný syr – Czech and Slovak cheese dish
- Welsh rarebit – British dish of cheese sauce on toast
- Ziva (dish) – Israeli savoury pastry

== See also ==
- List of cheese soups
- List of cheeses
- List of fondues
