= Grilled cheese (disambiguation) =

Grilled cheese may refer to:

- Grilled cheese sandwich
- Cheeses that are grilled or fried by themselves, including:
  - Halloumi
  - Saganaki
  - Leipäjuusto
- The Grilled Cheese aspiration, one of the aspirations from The Sims 2: Nightlife expansion pack.

== See also ==
- Fried cheese
- Cheese on toast
