= Cheddar sauce =

British sauce made with cheddar cheese

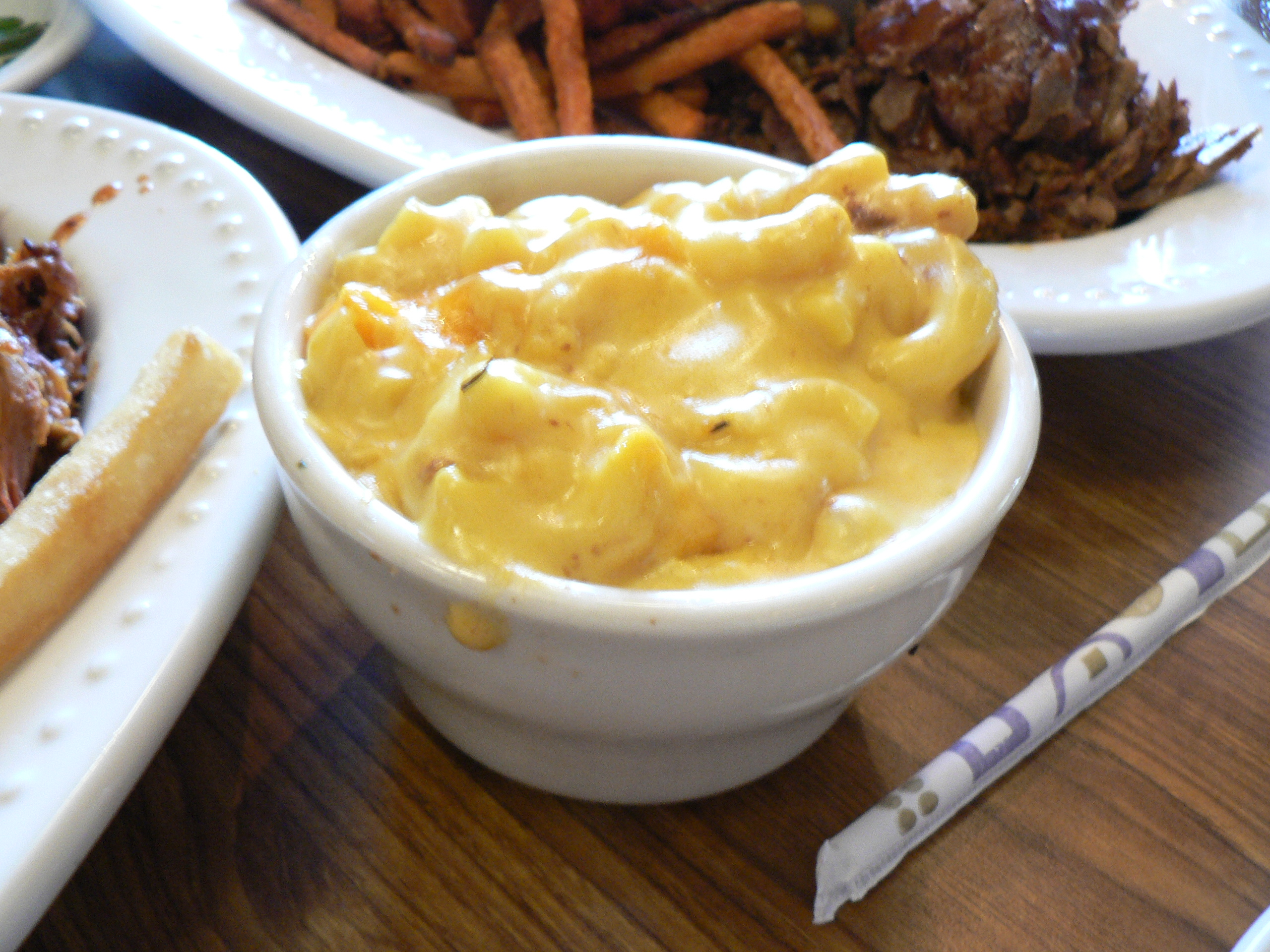
- A dish of macaroni and cheese, the basis of which is cheddar sauce
- Type: Sauce
- Place of origin: United Kingdom
- Region or state: Widespread throughout United Kingdom, United States (especially the south), Australia, Canada, New Zealand
- Main ingredients: Flour, cheddar cheese, butter, milk
- Variations: White cheddar sauce, Chili con queso
- Food energy (per 1 cup (~240 mL) serving): 310 kcal (1,300 kJ)

Cheddar sauce, cheddar cheese sauce, or cheese sauce is a traditional sauce used in English cooking. The sauce is based upon Béchamel (white) sauce, which is known as one of the 'mother sauces', and cheddar cheese. It could be seen as an English equivalent of the French Mornay sauce (itself a variant of Béchamel sauce traditionally mixed with half Gruyère and half Parmesan). The sauce is made by adding an amount of cheddar cheese to white sauce and then spiced using English mustard, Worcestershire sauce and pepper, among other ingredients.

It can be purchased both as a ready to use sauce and as a powder in British supermarkets. In the United States, a mass-produced cheddar sauce is purveyed under the Ragú brand, and is called "double cheddar sauce".

== Uses ==
Cheddar sauce can be used in a variety of ways including being poured over meats, types of pasta, vegetables and even as a dip. It is used in the preparation of a variety of British dishes, including the following:

- Fish pie
- Macaroni and cheese
- Cauliflower cheese
- Parmo
- Lasagna

== See also ==
- Cheese sauce
- List of cheese dishes
- List of sauces
