= Fried cheese =

Cheese dish fried in oil

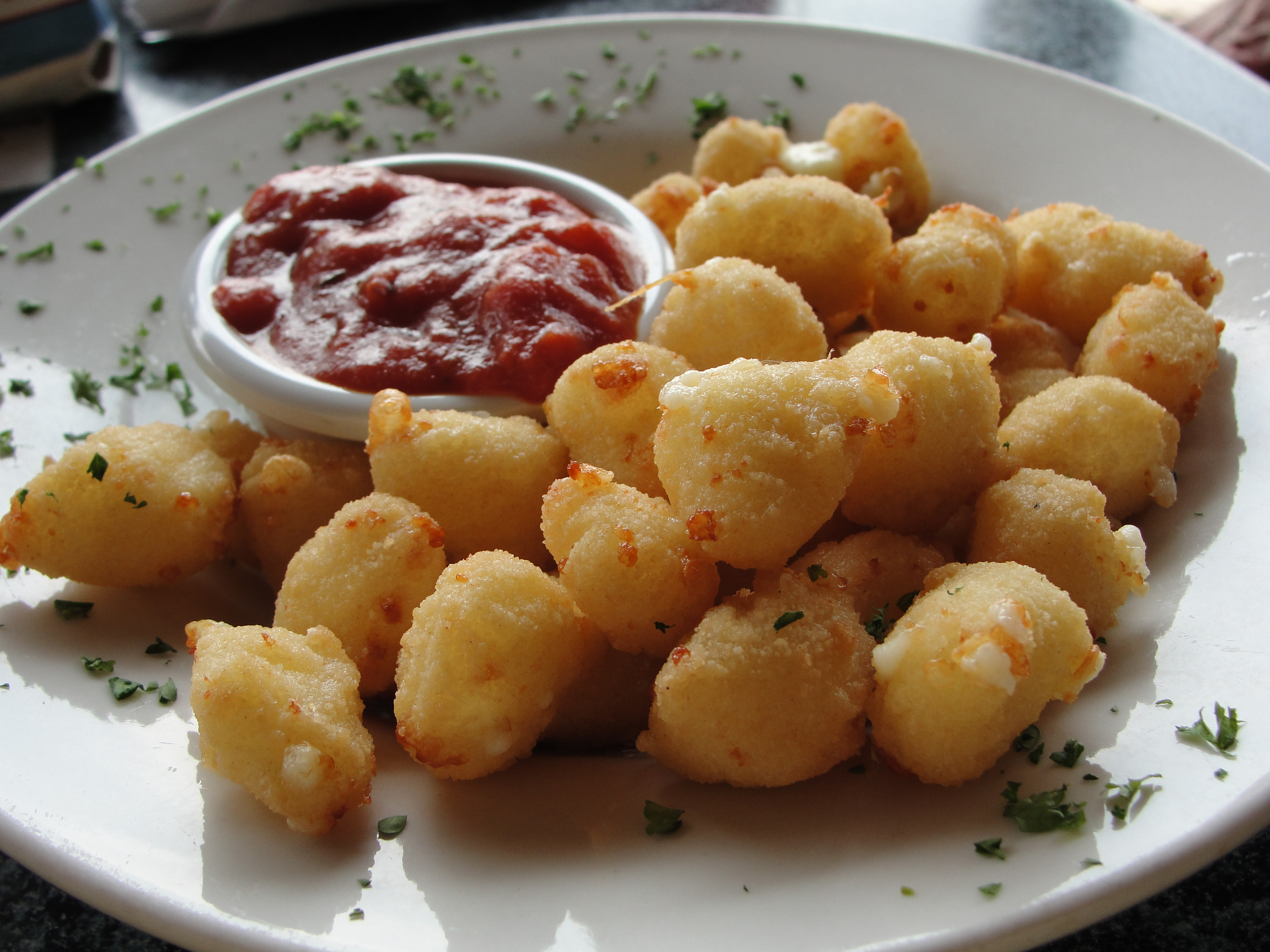
Fried cheese curds

Fried cheese is a dish of cheese that is fried in oil. Fried cheese can be dipped in a batter before frying, and can be pan-fried or deep fried. It can be served as an appetizer or a snack.

Fried cheese is typically served hot, right after being cooked. It may be accompanied by a dipping sauce or coated with a dressing.

Fried cheese is a common food in Brazil, and is typically served as a breakfast dish in Costa Rica, Cyprus, Greece, Lebanon, Syria and Turkey. Fried cheese is served as a tapas dish in Spain; fried cheese balls are delicias de queso (lit. 'cheese delights'). Fried cheese is also found in Italian cuisine.

== History ==
Fried cheese was a popular dish in Cairo during the Middle Ages, and remains a part of the cuisine under Ottoman rule. Since then, its popularity has decreased.

== Dishes ==
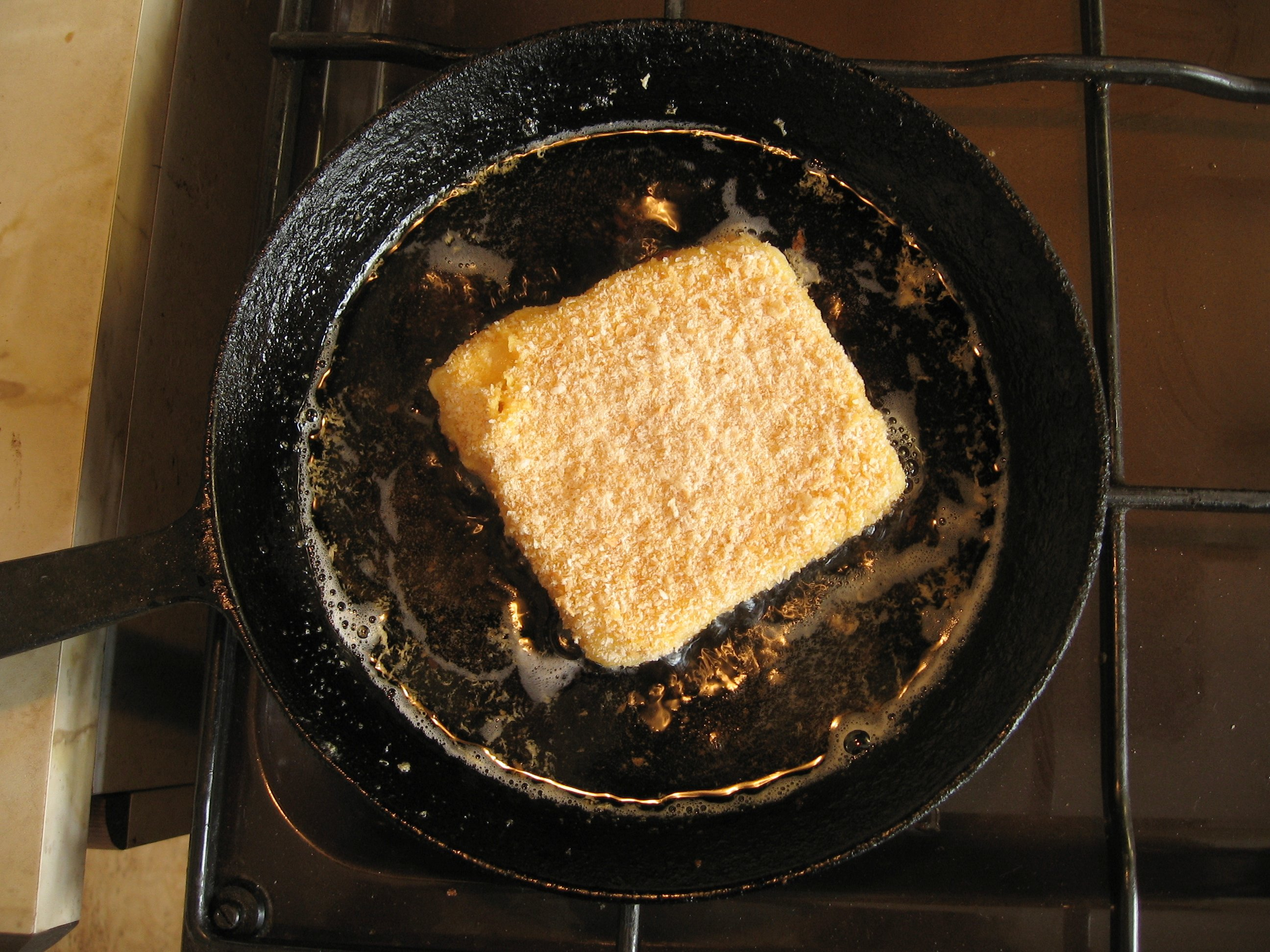
Smažený sýr being pan-fried in oil

Fried cheese curds is made from cheese curds and often served with a dipping sauce.

Queso frito 'Fried cheese' has many variations. Spanish versions sometimes use paprika. It is also found in Central American cuisine. (Note: "Central America (queso blanco, queso fresco, or queso frito) ...")

Malakoff is a Swiss-fried cheese dish.

Mozzarella sticks are slices of mozzarella cheese that are battered or coated in bread crumbs and then deep-fried or pan-fried. The dish can also be baked, rather than fried.

Saganaki is a Greek-fried cheese dish prepared in a small copper pan.

In Israel, the main way to prepare halloumi cheese is by frying it with olive oil in the pan, unlike the rest of the countries where grilling is the main way to do so.

In Egypt, جبنه مقليه gebnah ma'liyyah 'fried cheese' is usually battered and served as an appetizer; It is considered a specialty of Alexandria.

Smažený sýr (Czech) or vyprážaný syr (Slovak) is a cheese that is prepared by being dredged in flour, placed in an egg wash and then coated with bread crumbs, after which it is deep-fried. It is a common street food in the Czech Republic and Slovakia.

Kaassoufflé is a deep-fried Dutch fast food snack of cheese in a bread wrap.

In Hungary, fried cheese is a common cheap dish, served in restaurants or at home, usually made from the locally popular trappista cheese which accounts for 70% of the country's cheese consumption. It is a "poor man's" item of vegetarian food in restaurants which do not offer more usual vegetarian dishes and so prepare fried cheese and deep-fried vegetables as a main course option for any customer who does not want meat. The common name, rántott sajt, simply means 'fried cheese' or 'deep fried cheese'. It is generally served in a square or in a triangular shape.

Romania and Bulgaria have a similar dish to the Czechs, Slovaks and Hungarians, called caşcaval pane. Caşcaval is a general term for yellow cheeses in the two countries, with the ones most commonly used being Edam or Gouda. Therefore, the name could literally be translated as 'breaded yellow cheese'.

Fried cheese dishes

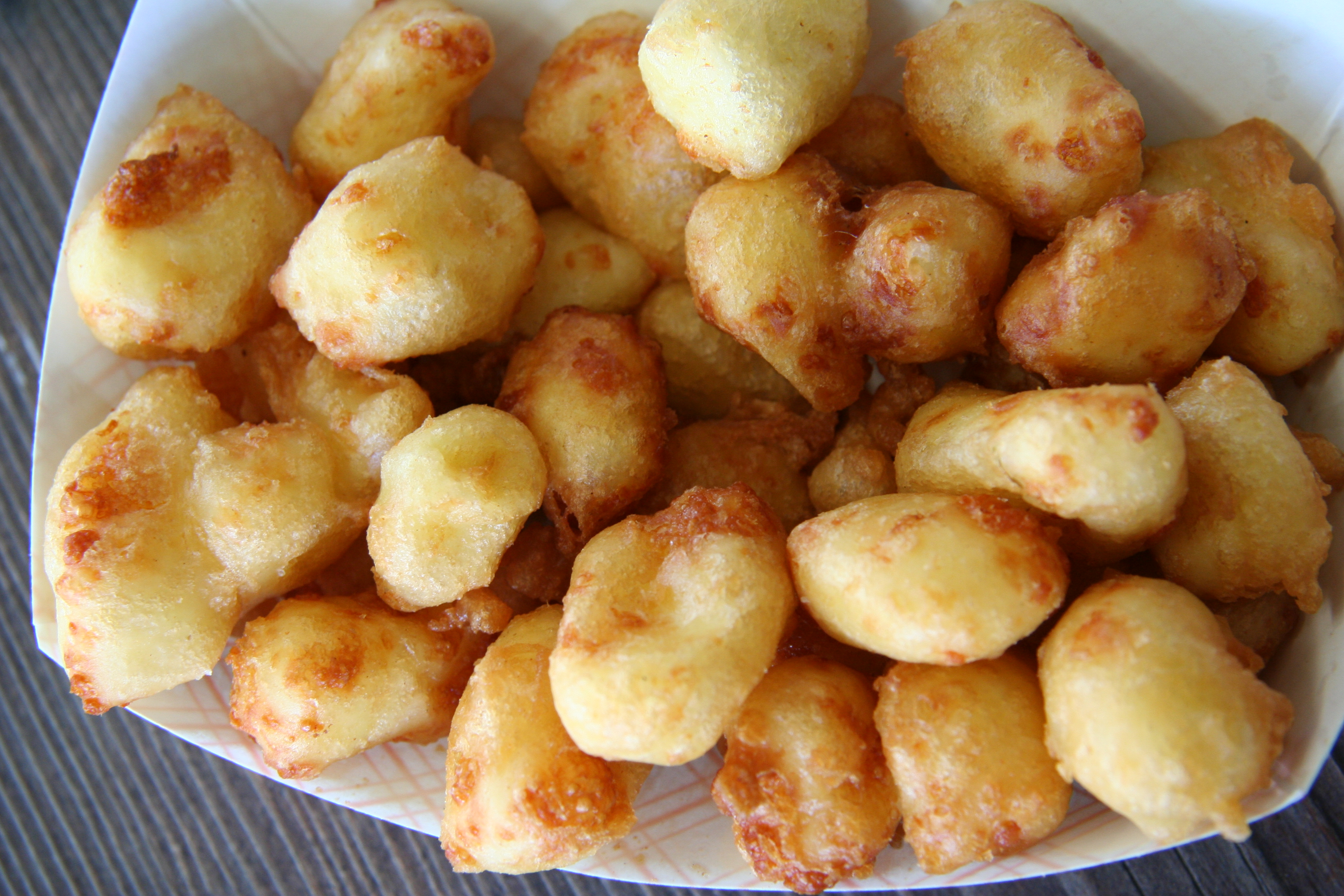
A close-up view of deep-fried cheese curds

Fried mozzarella sticks served with a marinara dipping sauce

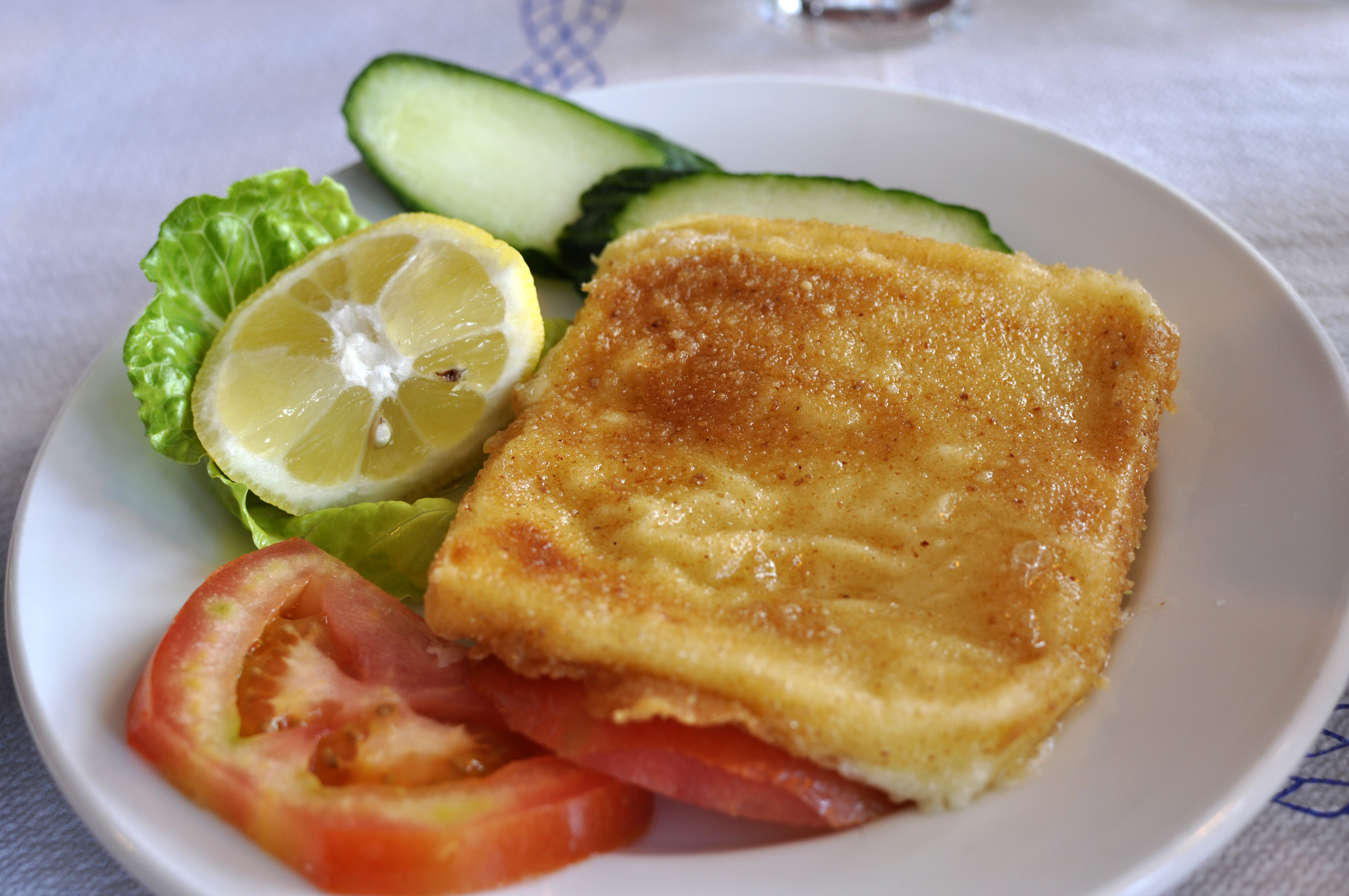
Saganaki

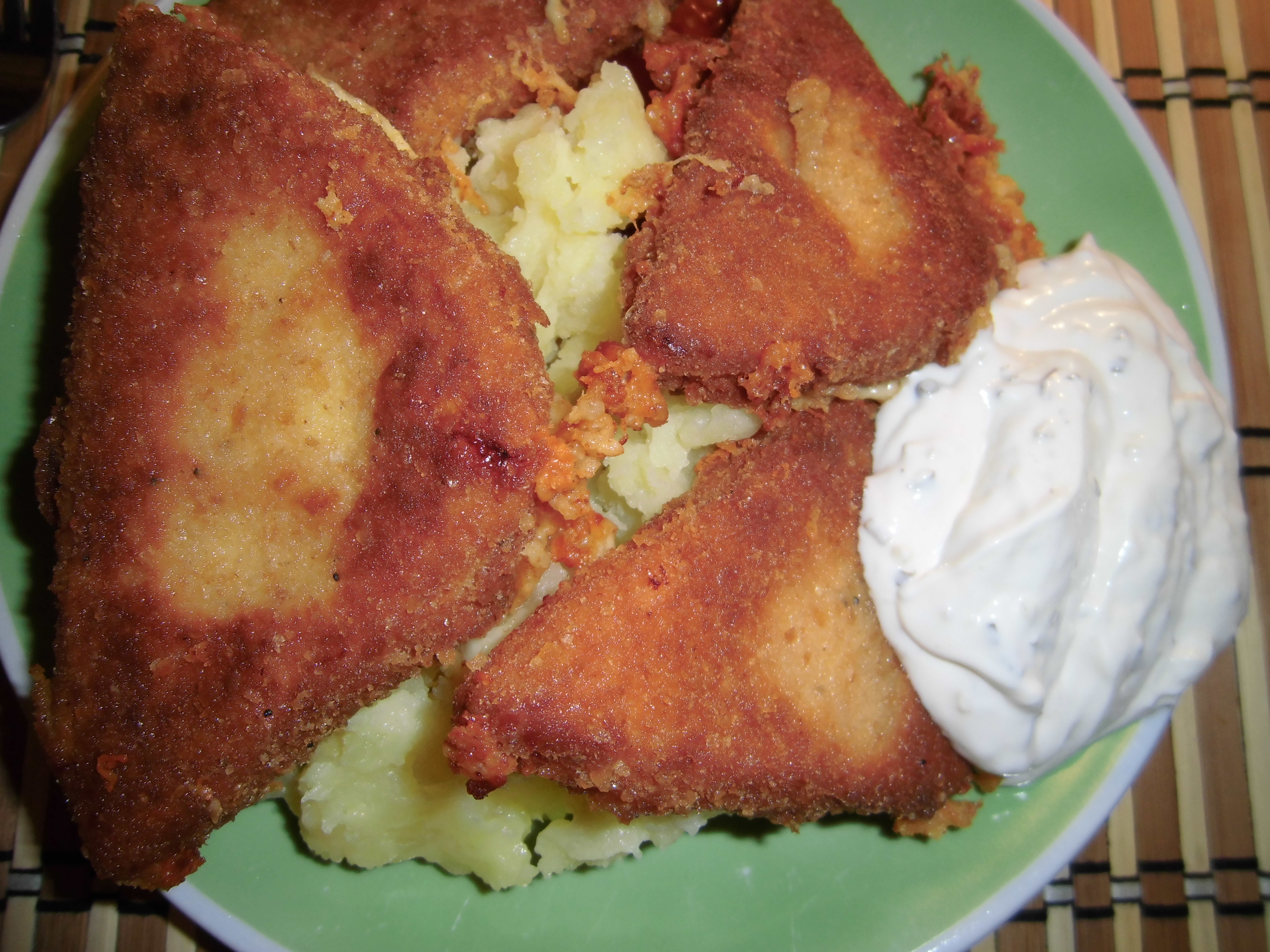
Prepared smažený sýr

== Cheeses ==
Cheese varieties commonly fried include:

- Halloumi
- Nabulsi cheese

== Commercial production ==
Mozzarella cheese is often used by fried cheese food manufacturers in the United States, because it has a desirable consistency and because it has a neutral flavor that is "widely acceptable".

== Health concerns ==
A significant amount of oil is absorbed into cheese when it is fried, and the frying of cheeses adds advanced lipid end products and dicarbonyls to advanced glycation end-products that are already present in cheeses. The advanced lipid end products are generated in a chemical reaction that occurs when the oil is intermingled with the proteins in cheeses. Furthermore, most cheeses are salty. As such, fried cheese has been described as an unhealthy dish.

In Brazil, the chronic consumption of fried cheese has been demonstrated to be one of the dietary risk factors associated with oral cancer incident rates. (Note: "Chronic consumption of fried cheese was among the dietary risk factors associated with the incidence of oral cancer in Brazil.")

== See also ==
- List of cheese dishes
- List of breakfast dishes
- List of deep fried foods
- List of tapas
- Syrniki – a fried quark pancake

== Bibliography ==
- Losso, J.N. (2016). The Maillard Reaction Reconsidered: Cooking and Eating for Health. CRC Press. ISBN 978-1-4822-4822-7.
