= Hellimli =

Foodstuff

Halloumoti/Hellimli
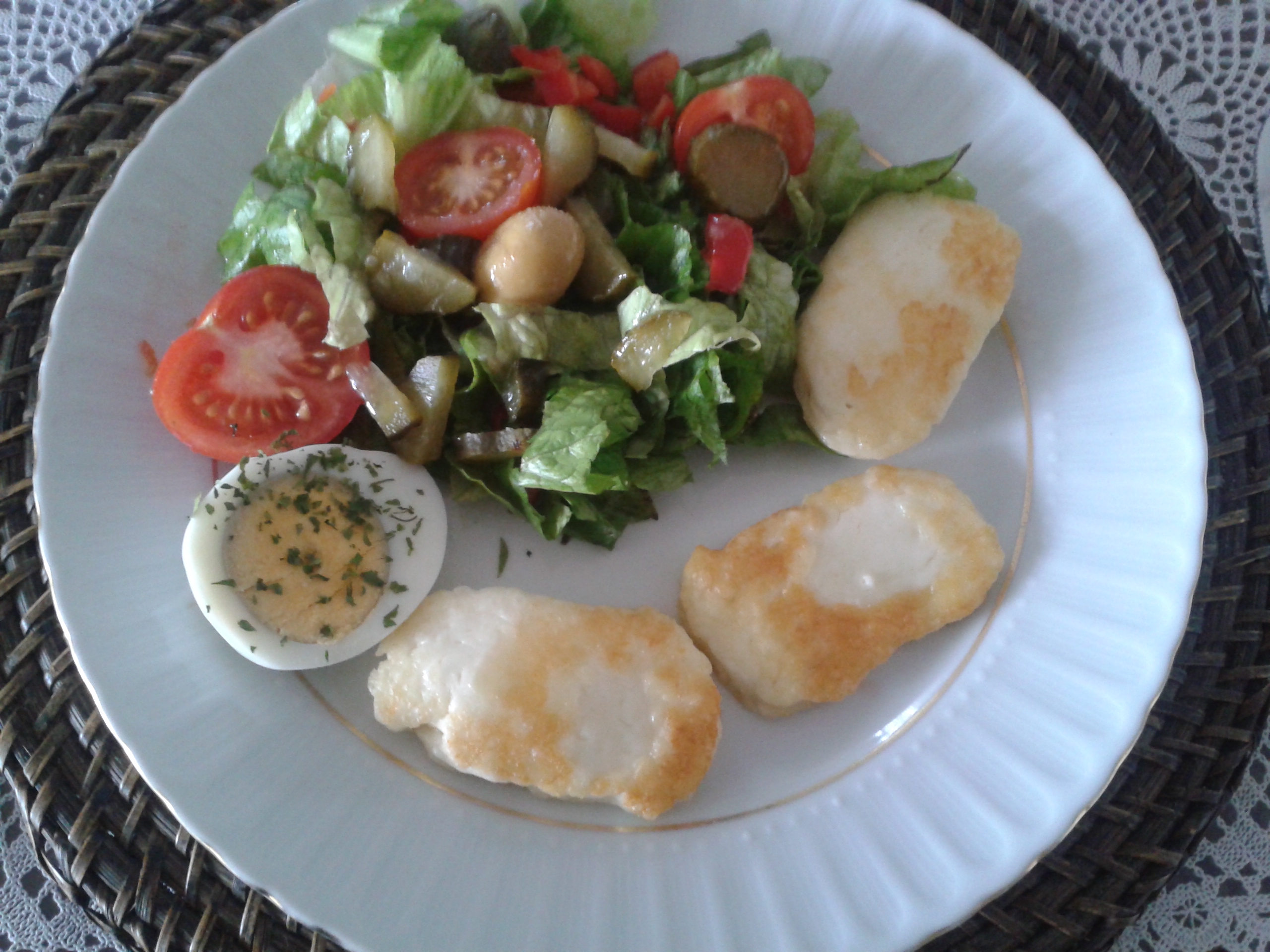
- Type: Bread
- Place of origin: Cyprus
- Main ingredients: Halloumi cheese

Halloumoti / Hellimli ( "Χαλλουμοτή" Cypriot Greek or Hellim Cypriot Turkish for halloumi, -li Turkish suffix meaning "with") is a Cypriot savoury yeasted bread made with halloumi cheese.
