= Moretum =

Herb cheese spread

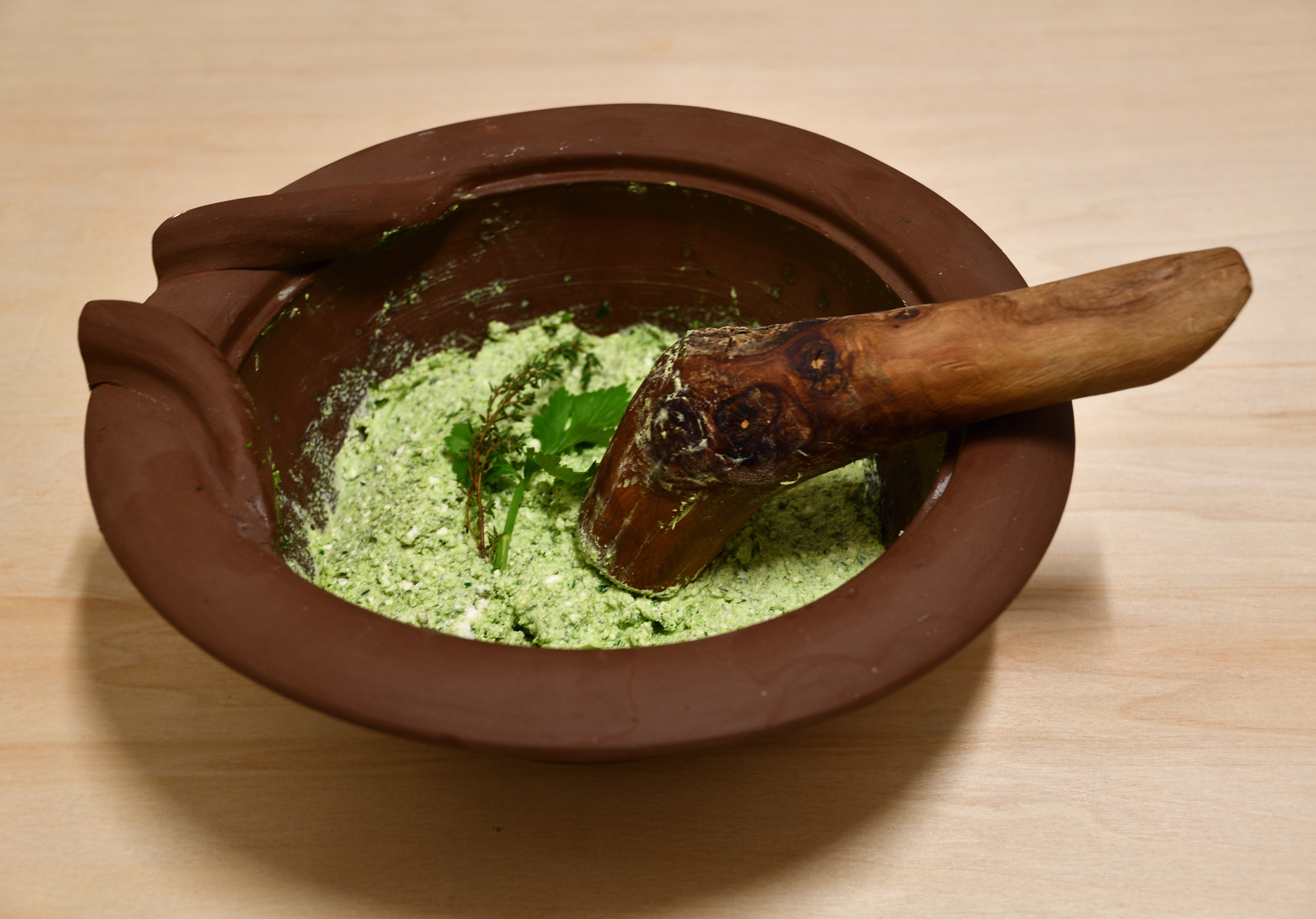
- Moretum in the mortar
- Type: Spread
- Place of origin: Ancient Rome
- Main ingredients: Herbs, fresh cheese, salt, oil, vinegar

Moretum is an herb cheese spread that the Ancient Romans ate with bread. A typical moretum was made of herbs, cheese (typically ricotta), salt, oil, and vinegar. Optionally, different kinds of nuts could be added. The ingredients were crushed together in a mortar, for which the dish is named.

== Recipes ==
A recipe for Moretum was handed down in a Latin poem of 122 dactylic hexameters attributed to Virgil under the title Moretum in the so-called Appendix Vergiliana. It describes, as a parody of the exaggerated praise of rural life, how a simple farmer begins his day's work; the centrepiece is the preparation of moretum for breakfast.

Moretum is also mentioned in Columella's De re rustica (XII 59, 1-4). In it, Columella mentions a variant in which walnuts are used instead of cheese, as well as alternatives with roasted sesame seeds, with pine nuts or almond kernels, as well as mixtures with dried herbs. The variant with pine nuts is considered to be a precursor of pesto.

In his didactic poems Fasti, Ovid mentions a type of moretum in connection with the use of the worship of the Magna Mater, without, however, giving more precise details. According to this, this moretum is said to be an ancient food and made from ‘pure milk’, i.e. ‘white cheese’ and crushed wild herbs.

== See also ==
- Ancient Roman cuisine
- List of cheese dishes
- List of spreads
