= Cheese slaw =

Australian side dish

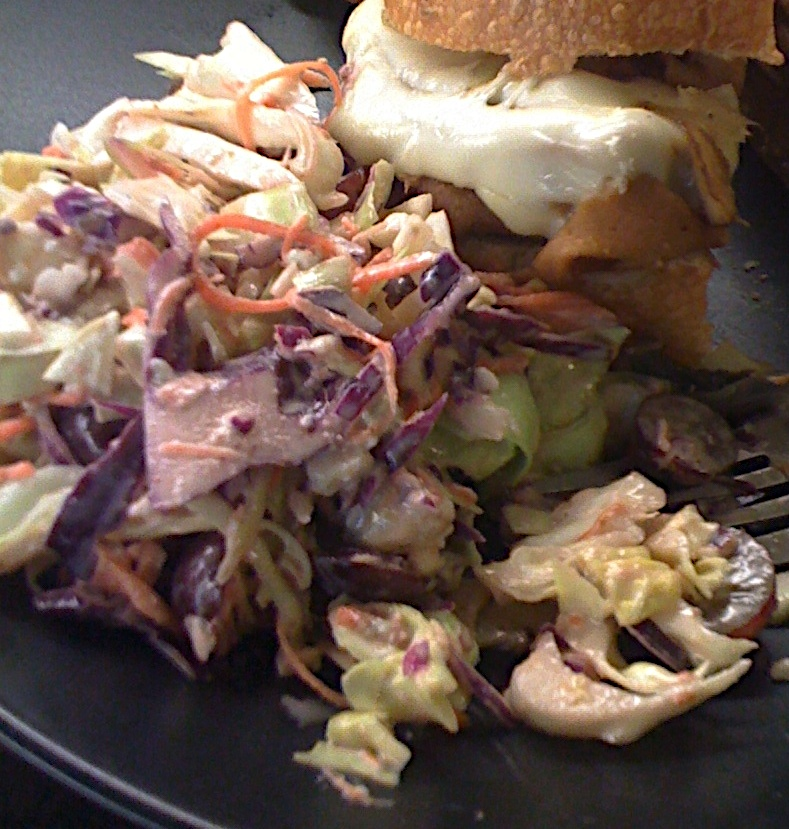
- Cheese slaw prepared with blue cheese
- Alternative names: Cheeslaw
- Type: Side dish
- Place of origin: Australia
- Serving temperature: Cold
- Main ingredients: Grated cheese, grated carrots, spring onion mayonnaise
- Similar dishes: Coleslaw
- Other information: Served as a side dish and as a hot dog topping

Cheese slaw is a side dish consisting of cheddar cheese, carrot, mayonnaise, and sometimes cabbage. Other cheeses such as blue and Swiss are occasionally used in its preparation, and additional vegetable ingredients are sometimes used. Its origins can be traced to Townsville in north Queensland, Australia, and to Broken Hill, New South Wales, Australia. It is a common and popular dish in Broken Hill restaurants and households. Cheese slaw is also consumed in some areas of the United States.

== Overview ==
Cheese slaw is prepared using grated cheese, crumbled or cubed cheese, grated carrot, and a mayonnaise dressing. Cheese slaw is very similar to some coleslaw recipes, but is distinguished by the inclusion of cheese. Cheddar cheese is typically used in the preparation, although other cheeses such as blue and Swiss are sometimes used. It often does not contain cabbage, as per coleslaw, although cabbage is occasionally used. Cheese slaw may contain other vegetables, such as chives, spring onions, shallots, parsley, and broccoli.

In the United States, cheese slaw is sometimes prepared using blue cheese, and is sometimes used as a hot dog dressing. In addition to the base ingredients, cabbage is also sometimes used in U.S. versions of the dish. U.S. versions have also been prepared using blue cheese salad dressing, instead of mayonnaise.

== History ==
The origin of cheese slaw has been somewhat disputed. Cheese slaw dates to at least 1939 in Australia, when a recipe for it was printed in the Townsville Daily Bulletin, a newspaper published in Townsville, Queensland. The recipe was for a "ham and cheese slaw", and included shredded cabbage, cubed cheese, julienne ham, mayonnaise, lemon juice, and mustard. Cheese slaw recipes were also published in the Australian Women's Weekly, a monthly women's magazine, in 1946 and 1966.

Some people claim that cheese slaw originated in Broken Hill, New South Wales. Cheese slaw is found extensively in Broken Hill, where it is served in restaurants, prepared in households, and has been stated to be "ingrained in the local diet". It has been served in Broken Hill cafes and milk bars since the second half of the 20th century. In Broken Hill, it is typically served as a side dish. Some people in Broken Hill top barbecued chicken with cheese slaw, which causes the cheese to melt.

== See also ==
- List of cheese dishes
- List of salads
