= Malakoff (food) =

Swiss fried cheese balls

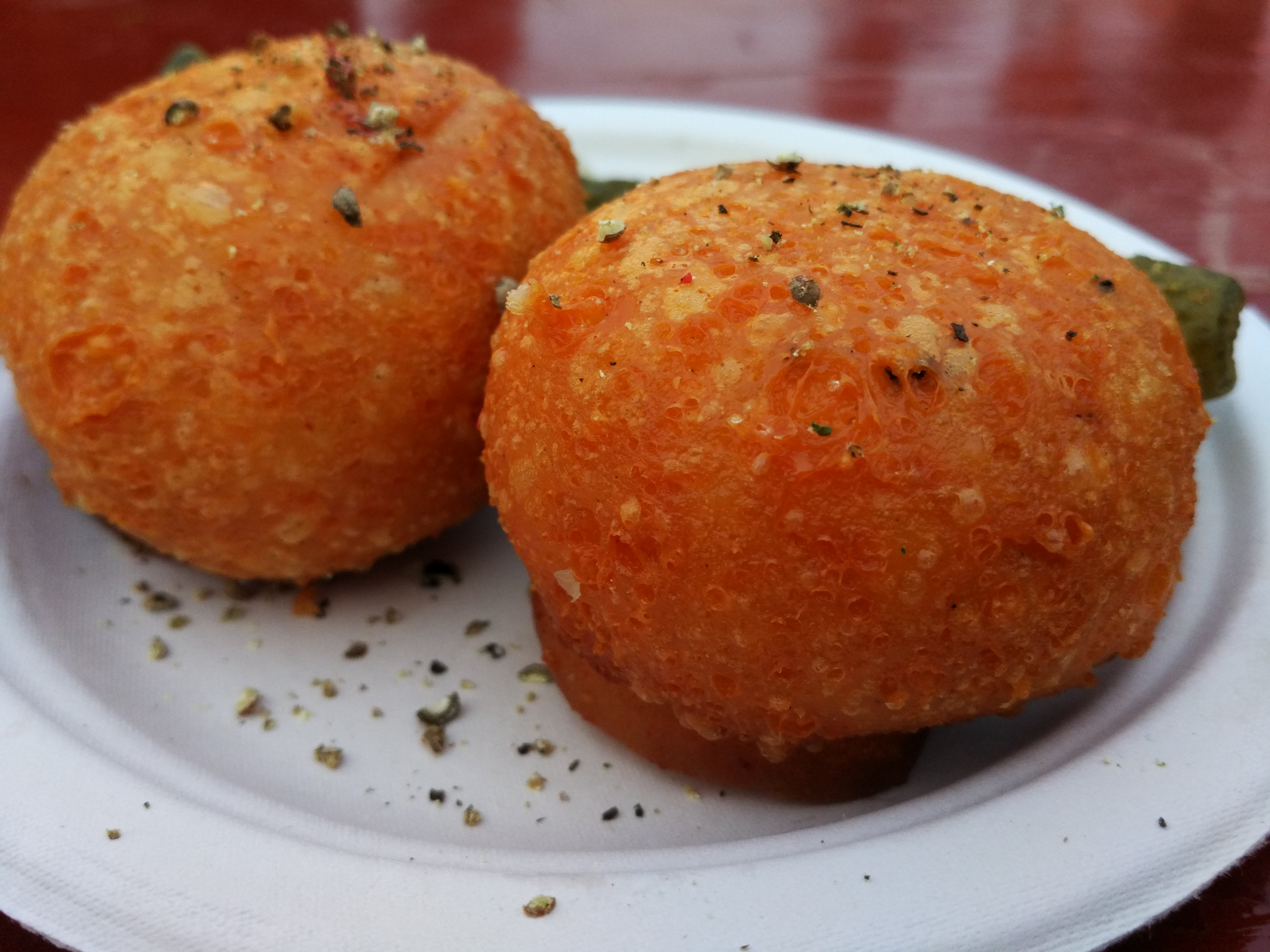
- Two malakoffs
- Type: Cheese dish
- Place of origin: Switzerland
- Region or state: Vaud
- Serving temperature: Warm
- Main ingredients: Cheese
- Variations: Vinzel beignet

A malakoff is a ball of fried cheese typically found in western Switzerland, particularly in the villages of Eysins, Begnins, Bursins, Luins, and Vinzel (where it is also known as “Vinzel beignet”) along the shores of Lake Leman. The name comes from the Battle of Malakoff, the dish itself having been invented by Swiss mercenaries during the siege of Sevastopol.

== History ==
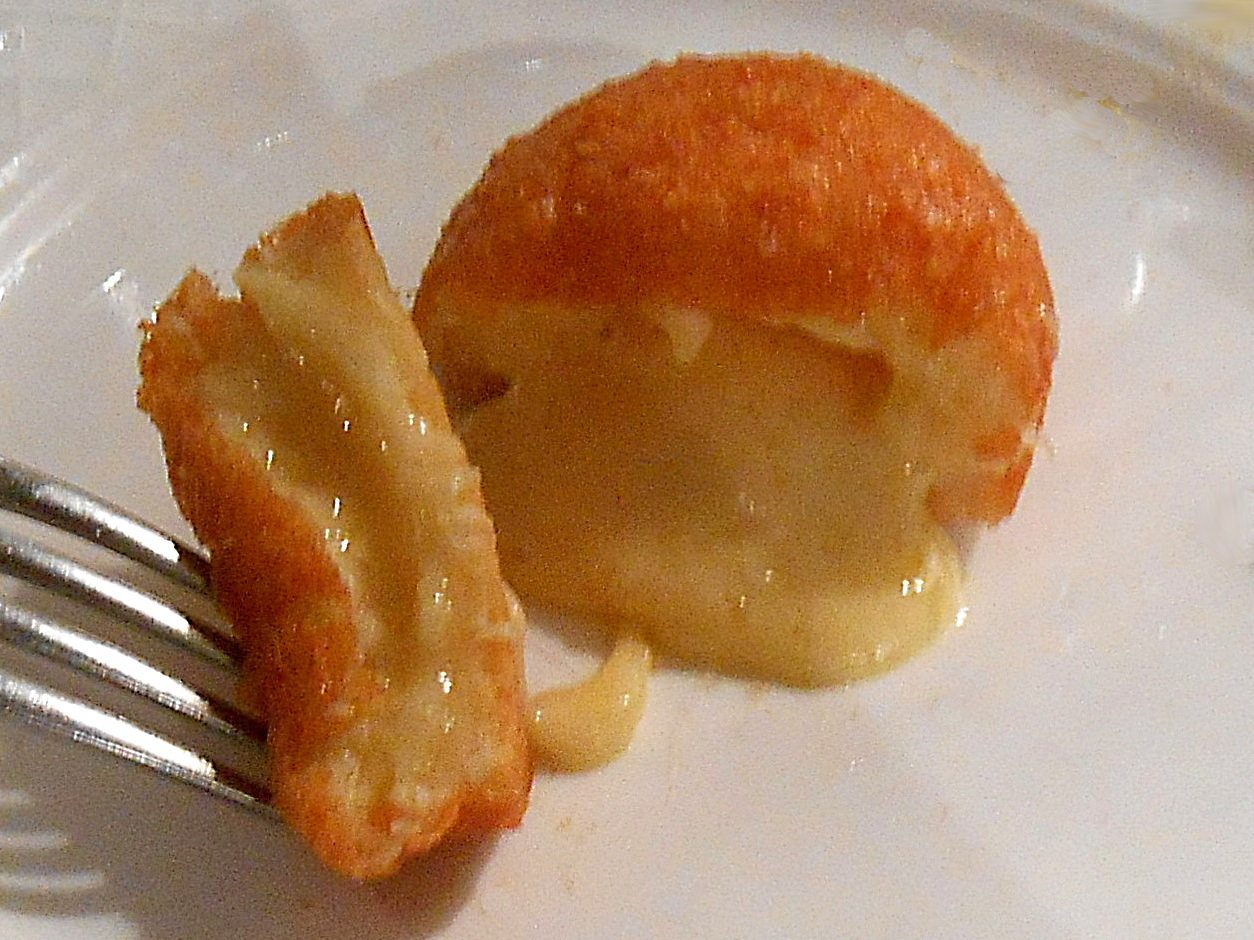
Interior of a malakoff

During the Crimean War (1853–1856), English and French troops, including many Swiss mercenaries, were stationed near Sebastopol, which was heavily defended by Fort Malakoff. General Aimable Pélissier ordered the construction of zigzag trenches to provide safe passage to the fort under Russian artillery fire. Legend has it that during this time, soldiers would fry slices of cheese in a pan or warm them over a campfire. However, the daily rations of the soldiers of the Swiss Legion did not include cheese and no written source has confirmed the legend.

After an eleven-month siege, the fort was taken in September 1855 and its capture led to the fall of Sevastopol and the Treaty of Paris on March 30, 1856. According to oral tradition, on returning home, many Swiss from Geneva and the La Côte would occasionally gather to taste slices of cheese fried in a pan in butter, accompanied by bread and many pitchers of white wine. In memory of the assaults on the famous Sebastopol tower, this famous cheese-based dish was named after the fort and called malakoff.

The modern malakoff recipe originated between 1880 and 1891 when Jules and Ida Larpin, a young couple from Bursins, were employed by Prince Napoléon-Jérôme Bonaparte his Prangins villa. Napoleon was hosting a reception attended by veterans of the Crimean War when Mrs. Larpin, always on the lookout for novelty in the culinary arts and at the request of the prince who wanted to honor his guests, served as a starter an adapted version of malakoffs in the form of a slice of cheese coated with pastry, fried and cooked in butter.

== Serving ==
Malakoffs are sometimes served as an hors d'oeuvre. Traditionally, malakoff was served in the form of sticks while Vinzel beignets were more like balls of grated cheese on bread and then fried, but the distinction has become less clear in recent years, with many establishments now serving spherical malakoffs.

== See also ==
- List of cheese dishes
- List of hors d'oeuvre
