= Caldo de queso =

Traditional Mexican cheese soup

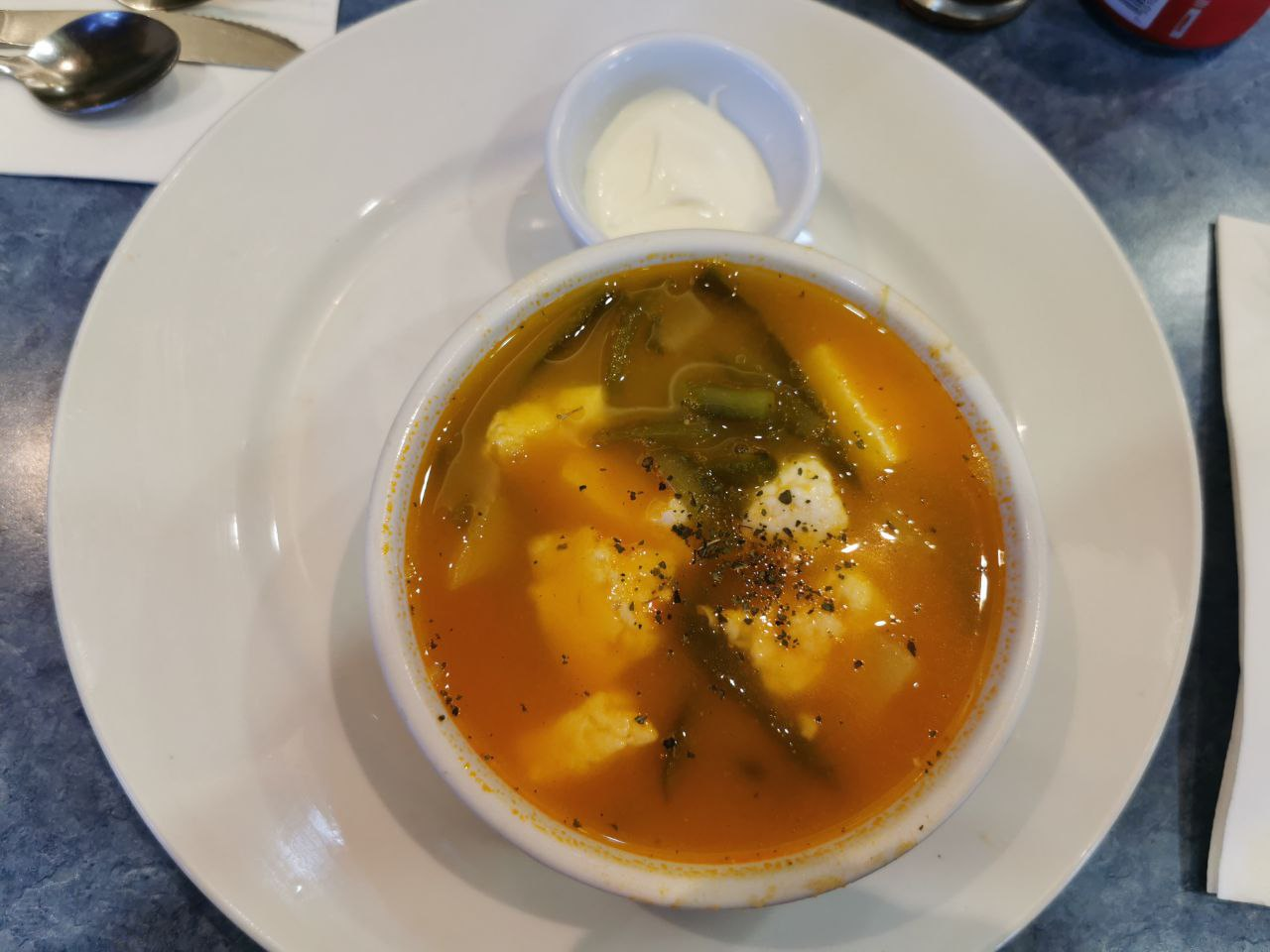
- Place of origin: Mexico

Caldo de queso is a traditional queso (cheese) soup made in places in Hermosillo, Sonora (north Mexico).

The soup is made with boiled water, diced potatoes, onions, tomato, green chiles and oregano. Tomato puree or dehydrated chicken broth may also be added to the mix as condiments.

The cheese is usually added only at the end, once the other ingredients are boiled, to prevent gratination. It is most usually prepared with dices of queso ranchero, queso fresco or queso cotija; the contact with the boiling soup heats the cheese and gives it a gummy, chewable texture; in turn it melts slightly, giving the soup a characteristic flavor.

Caldo de queso is generally accompanied by chiltepin or totopos (fried corn tortilla chips).

== See also ==
- List of cheese dishes
- List of soups
