= Cheese pudding =

Pudding dish made with cheese

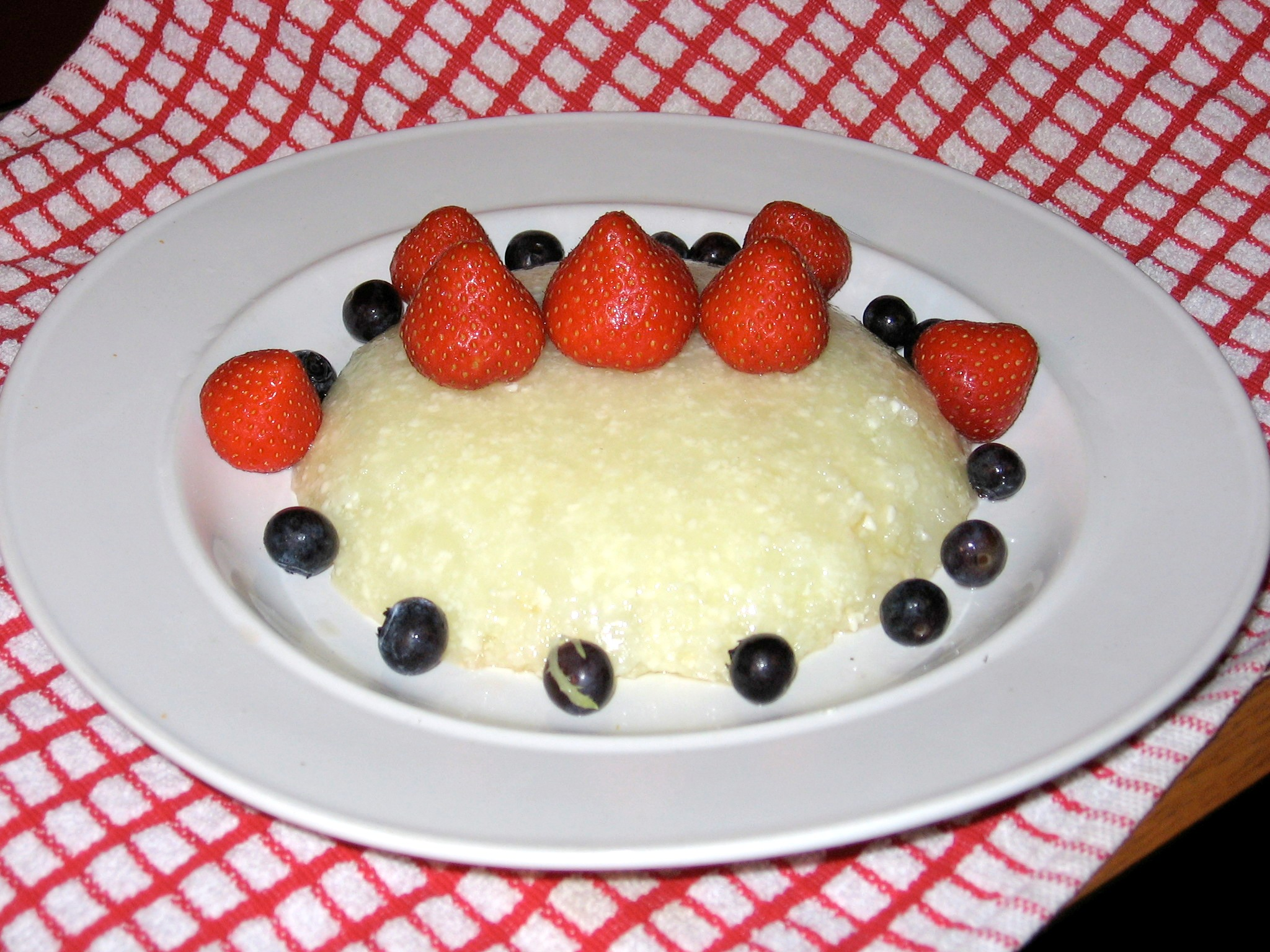
- A cheese pudding garnished with strawberries and blueberries
- Type: Pudding
- Serving temperature: Room temperature or cold
- Main ingredients: Cheese

Cheese pudding is a pudding made with cheese, which unlike cheesecake can be served at room temperature or frozen.

== History ==
A dish known as a cheese pudding was mentioned in The Carolina Housewife in 1874. However this was a savoury pudding which resembled a soufflé. Another savoury dish adds cheese to a bread pudding. In 1934 the sweet version was mentioned as a new addition to menus. One version is considered a Latin dish and is intensely sweet.

One version involves boiling cottage cheese, paneer or goats cheese, (rather than a cheesecake, which is based on cream cheese) with a sugar syrup, then adding extra ingredients such as pistachios or soft fruits such as cherries or cranberries, and freezing. Unlike a cheesecake, it is frozen or served at room temperature rather than chilled. Paneer Kheer is an Indian cheese pudding, made with sugar and milk.

It is inexpensive and in the past was recommended to families wanting three meals a day for a week, for $3, if they ate this and as another meal, stewed tripe.

== See also ==
- List of cheese dishes
