= Papas chorreadas =

Colombian potato and cheese dish

- Place of origin: Colombia
- Main ingredients: Potatoes, onions, tomatoes, cream, mild cheese

Papas chorreadas is a red potato and creamy cheese dish in Colombian cuisine. The boiled potatoes are served with onions and tomatoes. The name derives from the verb chorrear meaning to flow or pour and the sauce is intended to overflow the potatoes. Ingredients include red potatoes, onions, tomatoes, cream, and a mild melted cheese. Alternative recipes have used scallions, crumbled bacon topping, cilantro, cumin, and chile peppers.
