= Keshi yena =

Aruban and Curaçaoan main course dish

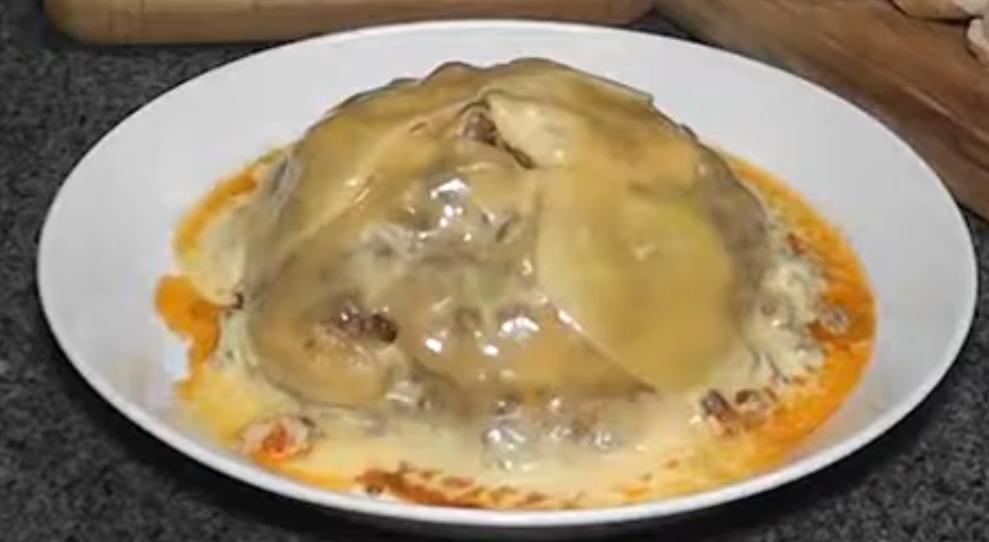
- The Aruban and Curaçaoan dish Keshi Yena
- Course: Main course
- Region or state: Caribbean

Keshi yena is an Aruban and Curaçaoan main course dish, consisting of a large round ball of cheese stuffed with spiced meat (often chicken), served steamed or baked. The dish is believed to have originated from Dutch Empire slaves of the Dutch West Indies stuffing leftover rinds of Gouda or Edam cheeses with meat table scraps. The name "keshi" is reported to be the Papiamento language rendering of kaas, "cheese" in Dutch. Modern keshi yena recipes typically include olives, raisins and chicken as ingredients in the stuffing. While some modern cooks prepare keshi yena in ramekins, others stick to the traditional method of baking the dish in an empty can of sausages, or by wrapping the cheese in plantain leaves.
