= Cauliflower cheese =

English dish

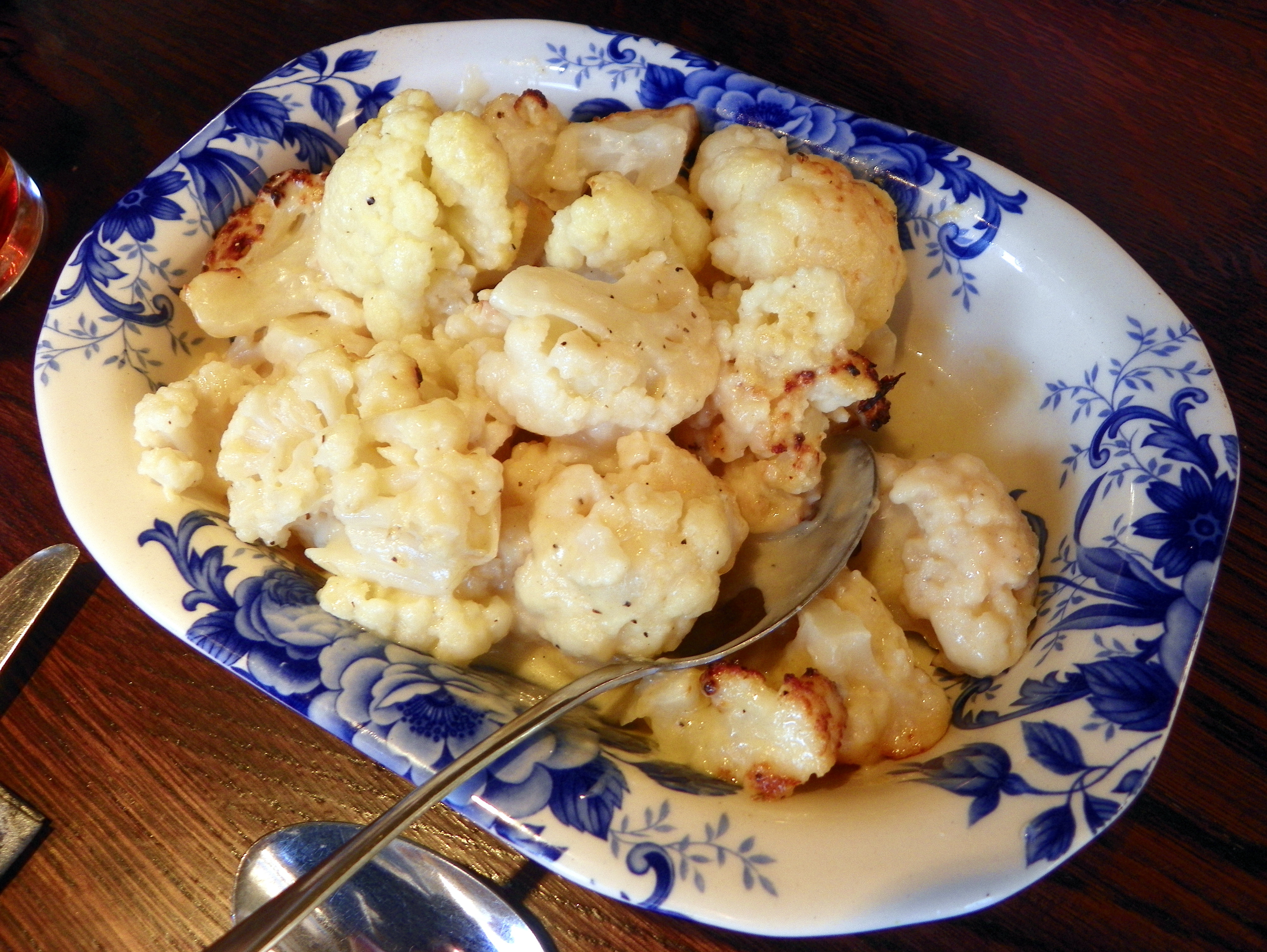
British cauliflower cheese in a bowl

Cauliflower cheese is a dish of boiled cauliflower covered in cheese sauce.

In the UK, cauliflower cheese is often eaten as a side dish, particularly with Sunday roasts, and at times as a main to accommodate vegetarian diets. The cheese sauce often has cheddar as its base, though sometimes others including Stilton or Swiss are used, and in more elaborate preparations includes nutmeg and English mustard. Toppings—cheese, more rarely breadcrumbs—are often added as a final element before the dish is baked.

Cauliflowers were introduced to England in the 17th century, and in Food Cultures of Great Britain this is taken as a likely origin for the dish. A recipe for "cauliflower and cheese" appeared in the vegetarianism activist John Smith's book The Principles and Practice of Vegetarian Cookery (1860). Smith advised serving his version with crispy pieces of bread known as sippets, and suggested replacing cheese with mushrooms or small, boiled onions. A year later, Isabella Beeton included a recipe for "Cauliflowers with Parmesan Cheese" in her original, 1861 edition of Mrs. Beeton's Book of Household Management.

Serving triangles of bread around cauliflower and cheese became fashionable in the 1950s. By the 2009 such practices were regarded as old-fashioned. In the 1960s, as supermarkets began selling ready meals, cauliflower cheese was invoked by Elizabeth David as a symbol of good British cooking as she asked wistfully whether a day would come that "it's going to be clever to serve some relaxed English dish like cauliflower cheese". Today, cauliflower cheese is popular as a flavor of pre-prepared baby food.

Cauliflower cheese is a popular dish in Northern Italy, where it is eaten under the name cavolfiore al gratin. (Note: In southern Italy, the term cavolfiore is often used to refer to broccoli, at times producing confusion.) As published by the Italian physician and journalist Amalia Moretti under the pseudonym Petronilla, cauliflower cheese may also be known in Italian as cavoifore alia besciamella. In US. publications, cauliflower cheese is sometimes described as the English version of macaroni and cheese, based on the notion that the latter is American.

== Gallery ==
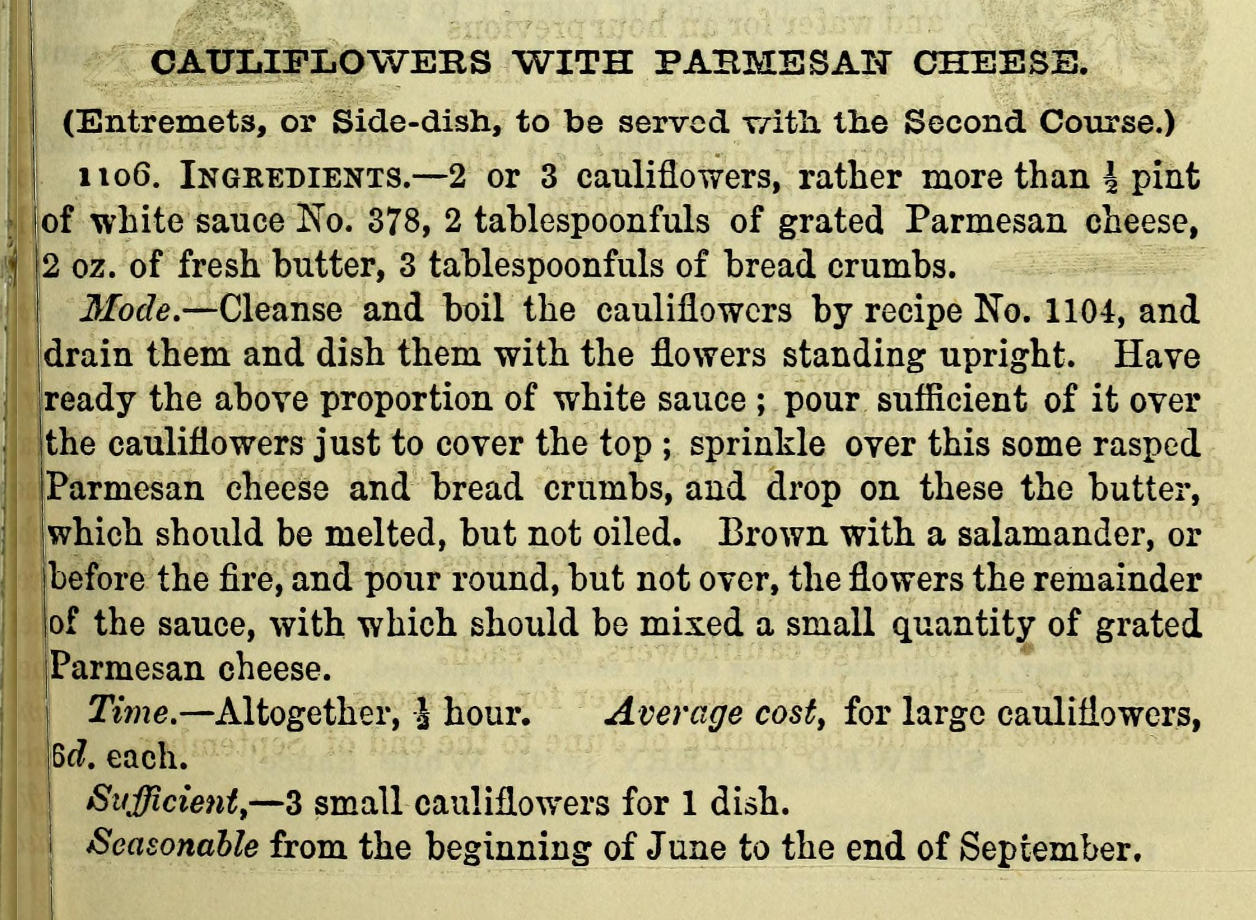
Recipe for "Cauliflowers with Parmesan Cheese" in the original, 1861 edition of Mrs. Beeton's Book of Household Management.

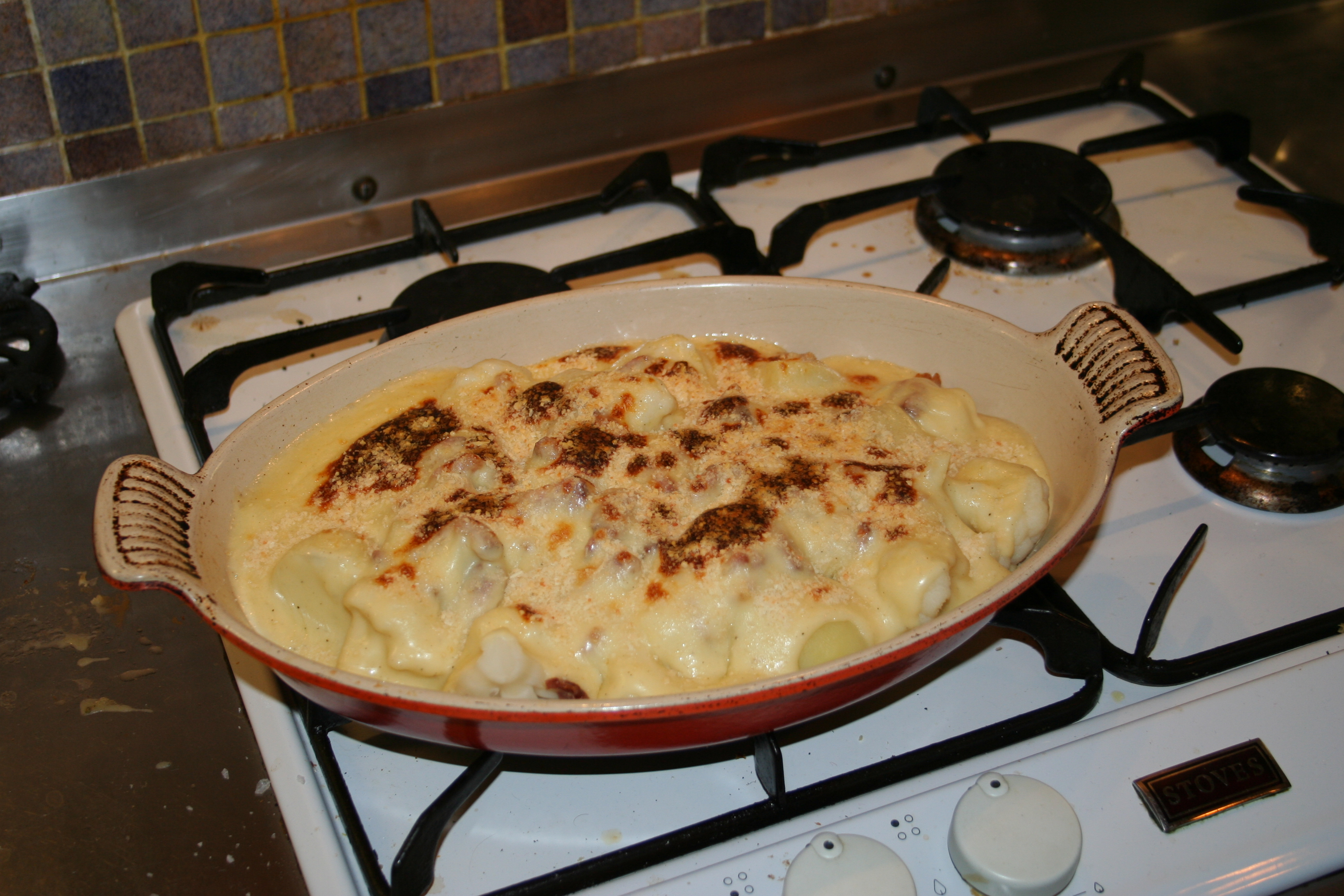
In a baking dish

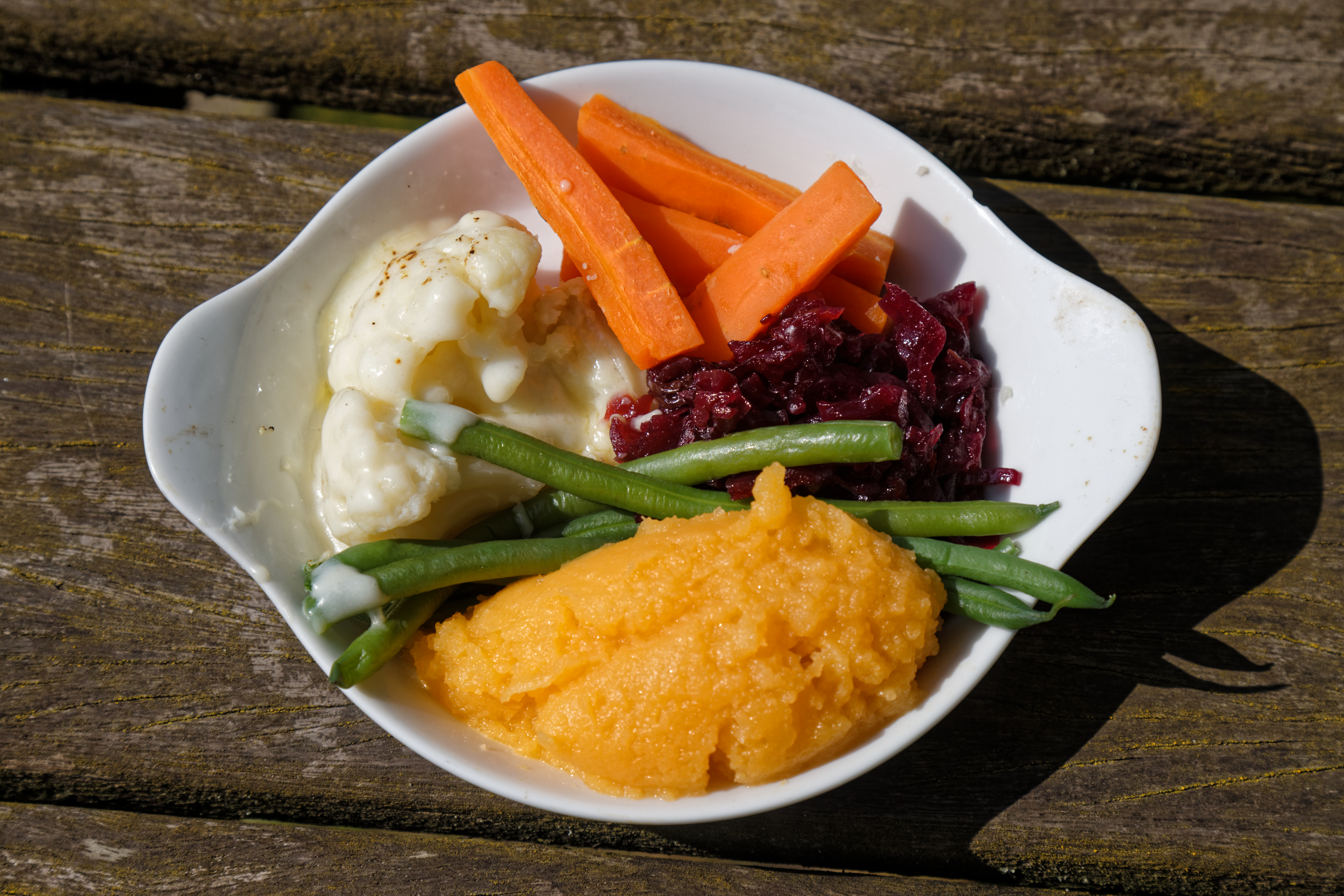
As part of a Sunday roast

== See also ==
- List of cheese dishes
