= Cașcaval pane =

European dish

Fried cheese
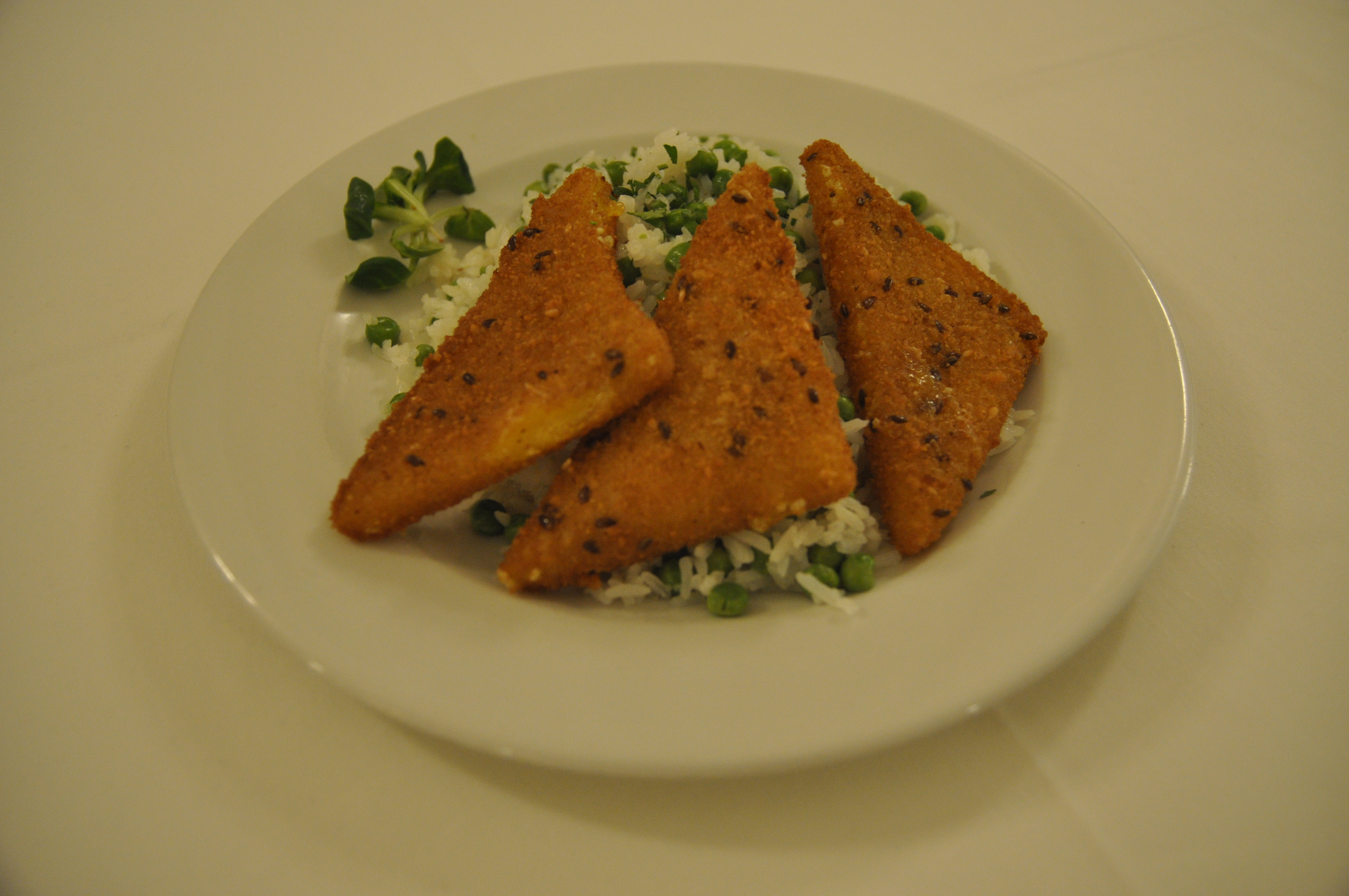
- Hungarian fried cheese with rice and peas.
- Alternative names: Rántott sajt, cașcaval pane, kashkaval pane
- Main ingredients: Trappist cheese, Flour, Eggs, Breadcrumbs,

Fried cheese (Romanian: cașcaval pane; Hungarian: rántott sajt) is a popular Eastern and Central European dish, most common in Hungary, Romania, and Bulgaria. It typically consists of a thick slice of semi-hard cheese that is breaded and deep-fried until golden and crisp, producing a soft, partially melted interior and a crunchy coating.

== Regional variations ==
=== Hungary ===
In Hungary, the equivalent dish is called rántott sajt and is most commonly made with Trappist cheese (also known as Oka cheese). Trappist is milder, softer, and melts more readily than kashkaval or cașcaval. Because it has a higher tendency to ooze during frying, Hungarian cooks often use thicker slices, double-coat the breadcrumbs, or chill the cheese before frying to prevent leakage. Rántott sajt is generally served as a main course rather than an appetizer, usually accompanied by French fries, rice, or mixed salads, and traditionally paired with a Hungarian-style tartar sauce made from mayonnaise and sour cream.

=== Romania ===
In Romania, fried cheese is known as cașcaval pane and is traditionally prepared with cașcaval, a semi-hard yellow cheese similar to Gouda or kashkaval. Romanian cașcaval has a slightly sharper, saltier flavor than the cheeses commonly used in Central Europe, which gives the fried dish a more pronounced taste. The cheese is typically cut into thick slices or rectangles, coated in flour, egg, and breadcrumbs, and then deep-fried. It is often served as an appetizer alongside mămăligă (polenta), mujdei (garlic sauce), or French fries.

=== Bulgaria ===
In Bulgaria, a similar dish is prepared using kashkaval (Кашкавал), the Bulgarian variety of cașcaval. Bulgarian kashkaval is typically firmer and slightly more elastic, which helps it hold its shape during frying. As a result, Bulgarian fried kashkaval tends to leak less and produces a dense, chewy interior with a crisp crust. The preparation method—flour, egg, and breadcrumb coating—is similar to Romania’s, but the firmer texture of Bulgarian kashkaval creates a noticeably different consistency. It is commonly served as a starter or snack, often paired with salads, fries, or simple dipping sauces.

== See also ==
- Mozzarella sticks
- Trappist cheese
- Kashkaval
