= Scovardă =

Romanian pastry

Scovargă
- Type: Pastry
- Place of origin: Romania
- Region or state: Transylvania
- Main ingredients: Dough, cheese

Scovargă is a type of stuffed pastry similar to empanadas popular in Romania, mainly Transylvania. They are usually referred to by the plural form "scoverzi".

== Preparation ==
The dough is folded around the stuffing which usually consists of different types of cheese, including urdă. Dill can also be added to the cheese stuffing.

Variations include:

- fruit preserve filling
- no filling and the resulting scoverzi are covered with powdered sugar or jam, resembling pancakes or Crêpes.

They are cooked by pan frying in sunflower oil.
