= Halloumi =

East Mediterranean semi-hard, unripened brined cheese

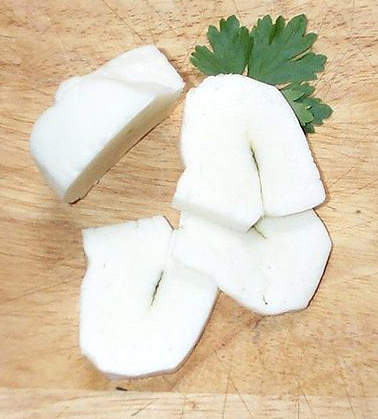
- Fresh sliced halloumi
- Place of origin: Cyprus
- Main ingredients: goat's, sheep's milk

Halloumi, or haloumi, (Note: /həˈluːmi/ hə-LOO-mee; also variably spelt hallumi, halumi, halloomi, haloomi and helloumi: Greek: χαλούμι, romanized: chaloúmi; Turkish: hellim; Arabic: حلوم, romanized: ḥalūm) is a type of dairy product made with milk originating from Cyprus. It is traditionally made from a mixture of goat milk and sheep's milk; however, due to lower cost of cow's milk and price sensitivity of consumers, modern halloumi increasingly contains cow's milk.

Halloumi has a high melting point and so can easily be fried or grilled, a property that makes it a popular meat alternative among vegetarians. Rennet (mostly vegetarian or microbial) is used to curdle the milk in halloumi production. No acid-producing bacteria are used in its preparation.

Because of halloumi's more basic pH, the protein casein is able to remain whole throughout the production process, forming dense networks that produce stick–slip friction against dental enamel. This gives halloumi a characteristic squeaky texture.

Due to trademark law, for a cheese to be called "halloumi" in the U.S. or the European Union, it must be produced in Cyprus. The global halloumi market is approximately US$500 million in sales per year; the UK is the largest importer. It is also imported by countries in Africa, the Middle East, Asia Pacific, and East Asia. Halloumi accounts for 13.4% of exports from the Republic of Cyprus.

== Etymology ==
The English name halloumi is derived from Modern Greek: χαλλούμι [xaˈlumi], khalloúmi, from Cypriot Maronite Arabic xallúm, which ultimately borrowed the word from Egyptian Arabic [ħalˈluːm]. The Egyptian Arabic word is itself a loanword from Coptic ϩⲁⲗⲱⲙ halōm (Sahidic) and ⲁⲗⲱⲙ alōm (Bohairic), and was used for cheese eaten in medieval Egypt. The name of it likely goes back to the Demotic word ḥlm 'cheese' attested in manuscripts and ostraca from 2nd-century Roman Egypt.

The Cypriot Turkish name hellim derives from this source, as does the name of the different modern Egyptian cheese hâlûmi.

== History ==
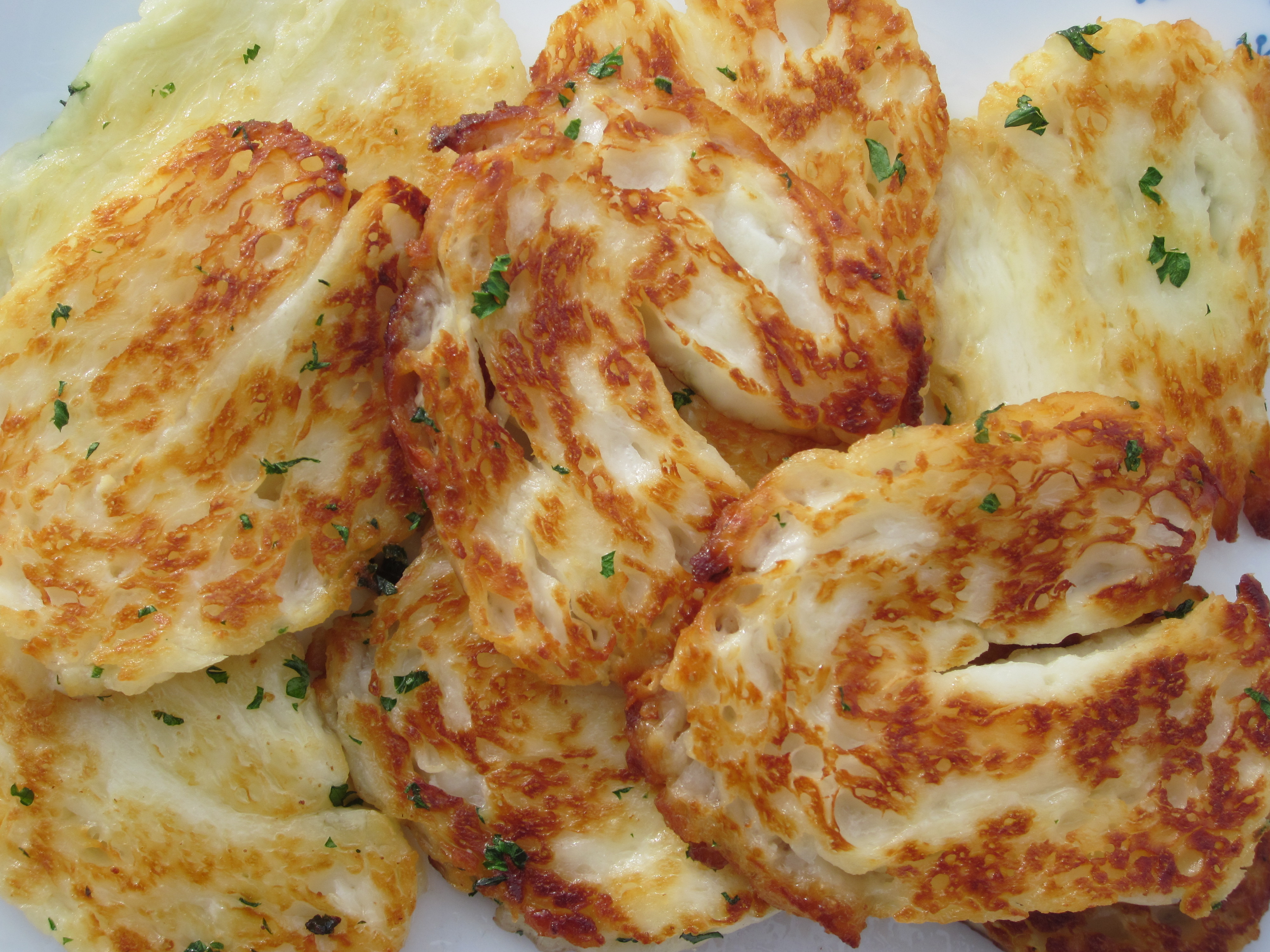
Fried halloumi

Halloumi is thought to have first been made by Bedouins, as its preserved qualities were ideal for a nomadic lifestyle. According to folklore, sometime between AD 395 and 867 a herder in Cyprus combined milk from sheep and goats. The herder then heated the mixture over a fire, sifted out the curds as they separated from the whey, then formed the curds into blobs and left them to cool.

A recipe for enhancing ḥalūm by brining is found in the 14th-century Egyptian cookbook كنز الفوائد في تنويع الموائد (Kanz al-Fawāʾid fī Tanwīʿ al-Mawāʾid).

The earliest known surviving descriptions of halloumi in Cyprus were recorded around 1554 by Florios Voustroniou, head of the Secretariat in the Venetian administration of Cyprus, where it was called "calumi". The manuscript was transcribed by Leonardo Donato, later Doge of Venice. In 1788, Archimandrite Kyprianos referred to the cheese in his book Chronological History of the Island of Cyprus, where he also noted that the cheese was exported.

Traditionally, Cypriot halloumi was made from goat’s and/or sheep milk, since there were few cows on the island until they were introduced by the British in the 20th century. It was typically made by cooperatives formed in villages, typically consisting of 10-15 women; the woman with the most goats led the cooperative. In the early 1940s, authorities began issuing licenses to produce it.

By 2013, demand in the UK had surpassed that in every other European country except Cyprus, where that year, the average resident ate 8 kilograms of halloumi per year.

In 2018, a protocol was signed for the export of halloumi to China and sales surged. This led to a shortage of halloumi, exacerbated by high temperatures that led animals to produce less milk.

As demand grew, industrial halloumi-makers began using more of the cheaper and more plentiful cow's milk; by 2019, almost all halloumi exported to the UK was composed of 80% cow's milk.

In 2023, annual production of the cheese exceeded 450,000 tons. The U.S. imported 5,000 tons of halloumi, Japan imported 2,500 tons, and the UK imported 18,000 tons.

== Overview and preparation ==
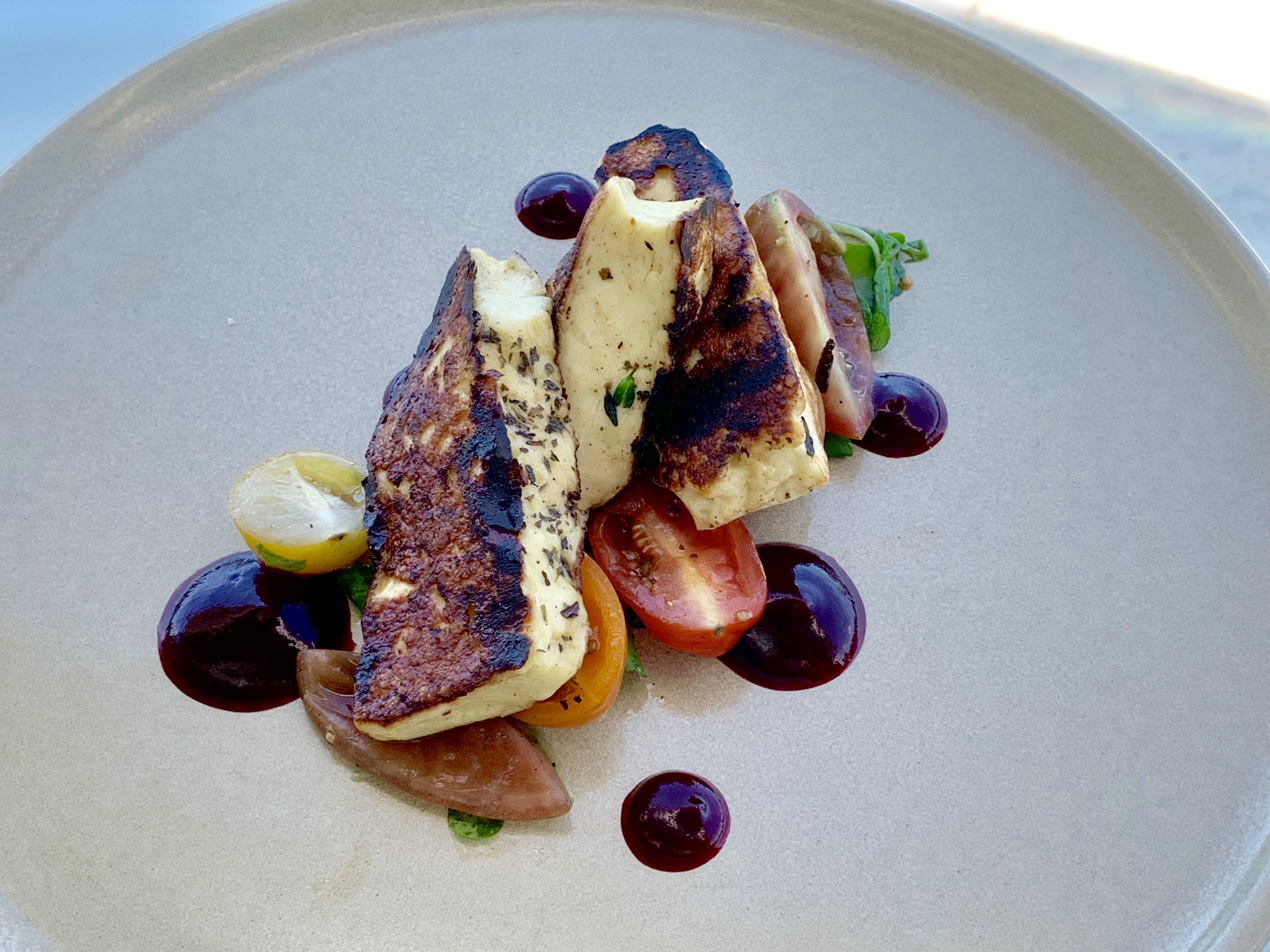
Halloumi dish at a five-star luxury hotel

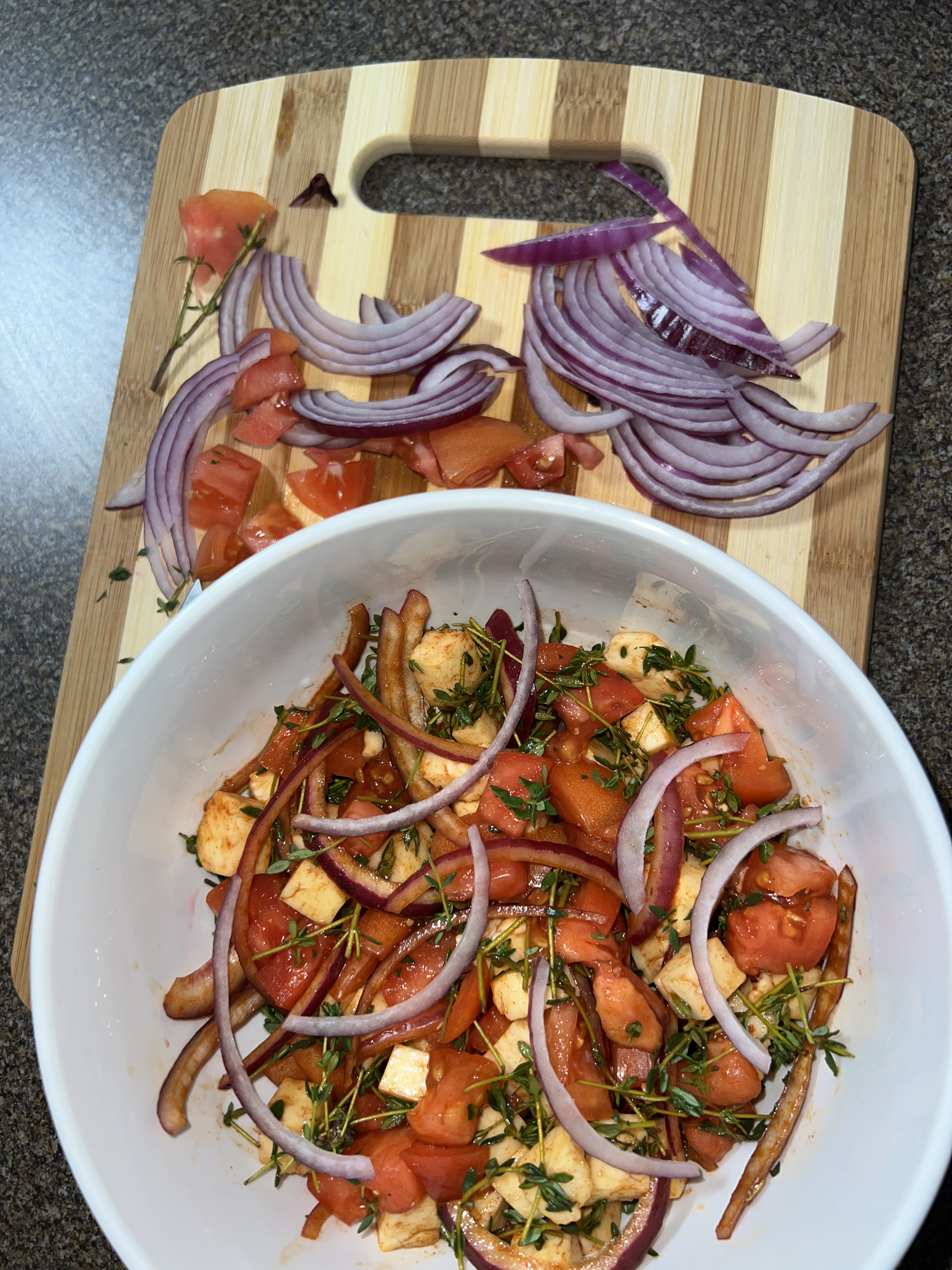
Thyme salad garnished with cubes of halloumi

Although it can be consumed raw, halloumi is often used in cooking and can be fried until brown (without melting) due to its higher-than-typical melting point. This makes it excellent for frying or grilling (as in saganaki) and serving either as is, or with vegetables, or as an ingredient in salads or sandwiches. There are many recipes that use halloumi beyond simple grilling. Halloumi can be marinated in oil and aromatics before cooking so it holds on to more flavor. It can also be grated and baked in fritters or fried to create crumbs for garnish.

Traditional halloumi is a hemispherical shape, weighing 220–270 grams (7.8–9.5 oz). The fat content is approximately 25% wet weight, 47% dry weight with about 17% protein. Its firm texture when cooked causes it to squeak on the teeth when being chewed.

Traditional halloumi is typically made from fresh, unpasteurized goat’s and/or sheep milk. However, for its commercial production a mixture of pasteurized cow’s, goat and sheep milk is used.

Two main types of halloumi exist: fresh and mature. Fresh halloumi has a semi-hard, elastic texture and a milder, less salty flavor compared to the aged version. As mature halloumi is stored in brine, it has a harder, drier texture, as well as a saltier flavor. Both versions have a slight minty flavor, due to the addition of spearmint during the production of the cheese.

If properly sealed and refrigerated, halloumi (both fresh and mature) can last for as long as a year.

== Production ==
Production of halloumi involves several key steps:

The first step of halloumi production involves the coagulation of the milk in order to make curds. This is done by stirring rennet into the milk mixture while keeping it at a temperature of 30–34 °C until the milk coagulates (a process which takes approximately 30–45 minutes). Once the curd is formed, it is then cut, reheated and stirred in order to increase its firmness. The curds are then added to special molds and pressed until a sufficient amount of whey has been removed.

The next step of production involves the boiling of the pressed curds in hot whey (collected during the pressing of the curds) for at least 30 minutes, during a process known as scalding. This is the most crucial step in the halloumi production, as it contributes to the characteristic texture of the cheese. The cooked pieces are then removed from the whey and are salted and garnished with fresh or dried mint (Mentha viridis) leaves. They are then folded and stored in salted whey for 1–3 days before being packed in airtight containers, ready to be sold and consumed.

For the production of mature halloumi, the cheese needs to be kept in the brine whey for at least 40 days.

== Nutritional facts ==
100 grams (3.5 oz) of commercially produced packaged halloumi branded by Tesco contains:

Fat	24.6 g
Saturated fat	17.0 g
Carbohydrates	0.8 g
Sugar	0.5 g
Protein	22.0 g
Energy	313 calories
Salt	3.0 g

== Legal issues ==
In the United States, Halloumi is a registered trademark owned by Cyprus, while in the UK it is owned by the Foundation for the Protection of the Traditional Dairy Product of Cyprus.

It is protected as a geographical indication in the European Union, as a protected designation of origin (PDO), which means, within the EU, only products made in certain parts of Cyprus can be called "halloumi". PDO protection for Halloumi was delayed largely by disagreements among farmers of cattle, sheep, and goats regarding the inclusion of and amount of cows' milk in it.

In 2006, a German enterprise registered the trademark "Gazi hellim"; hellim is the name of it in the Turkish language. The Cypriot dairy producers' organisation filed a complaint with the European Union Intellectual Property Office, which was rejected.

== In popular culture ==
- Georgios Vizyinos, who lived in Cyprus as a teenager, wrote a poem To Ptochon tis Kyprou (Το πτωχόν της Κύπρου) (1867) that describes eating halloumi in a village.
- The Cypriot surnames Halloumas, Hallouma, Halloumakis, and Halloumis likely relate to halloumi production.

== See also ==
- Fried cheese – Cheese dish fried in oil
- Bread cheese
- List of cheeses
- Queijo coalho – Brazilian cheese
- Saganaki – Greek fried cheese dish
