= Mozzarella sticks =

Fried breaded or battered mozzarella

- Mozzarella sticks and marinara sauce
- Alternative names: Hot Cheese Sticks
- Course: Hors d'oeuvre
- Serving temperature: Hot
- Main ingredients: Mozzarella, batter or breading

Mozzarella sticks are elongated pieces of battered or breaded mozzarella, usually served as hors d'oeuvre.

== Origins ==
The history of frying cheese in a batter dates back to at least 1393 in medieval France, when a recipe for fried cheese sticks appeared in Le Ménagier de Paris. However, food historians believe that medieval French fried cheeses had little in common with the preparation and development of modern mozzarella sticks.

Mozzarella sticks most likely have their origins in the United States during the 1970s, through a combination of two factors, as per historian Joel Jensen: "the increasing availability of mass-produced mozzarella cheese beginning in the 1960s", and the development of new efficient frying technologies to be used in fast-paced food-serving businesses (such as bowling alleys and sports bars). Food writer Arthur Schwartz describes mozzarella milanese, an Italian dish of mozzarella dredged in flour, egg, and breadcrumbs and then pan-fried as the "prototype" of the American mozzarella stick. He describes these as typically made from older mozzarella as a midweek meal, and as being eaten "within seconds" of emerging from the pan.

== Preparation ==
Mozzarella sticks are prepared by coating cheese strings in breadcrumbs or batter. They may be baked or fried in oil. Mozzarella sticks are often served with tomato sauce or marinara sauce. However, they may be served with other dipping sauces such as plum sauce, jalapeño jelly, ketchup, barbecue sauce, honey mustard, and ranch dressing. Restaurants often serve fried mozzarella sticks with a marinara sauce.

== Variations ==
Popular fried cheeses other than mozzarella include provolone, Edam, cheddar, and American. Mozzarella sticks with raspberry sauce are part of the regional cuisine of New York's Capital District. In many public schools throughout the United States, Bosco pizza sticks—soft breadsticks stuffed with mozzarella and served with a side of tomato sauce for dipping—have become a popular staple.
