= Bacon, egg and cheese sandwich =

Breakfast sandwich

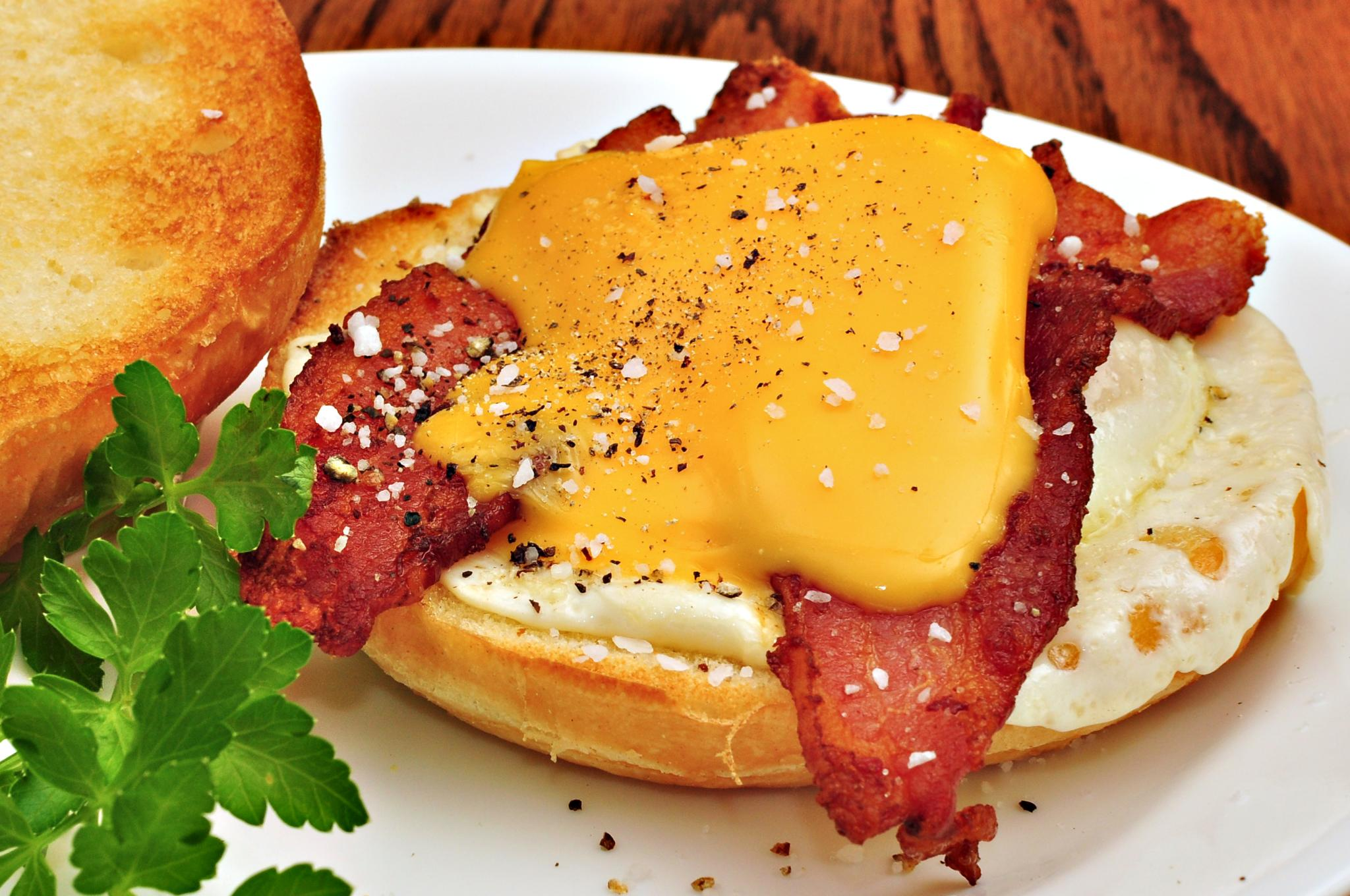
- An open bacon, egg, and cheese sandwich
- Type: Breakfast sandwich
- Main ingredients: Bread, bacon, eggs (fried or scrambled), cheese

A bacon, egg, and cheese sandwich is a breakfast sandwich made with bacon, eggs (most often fried or scrambled), cheese and bread. It is popular in the United States and Canada.

== Description ==
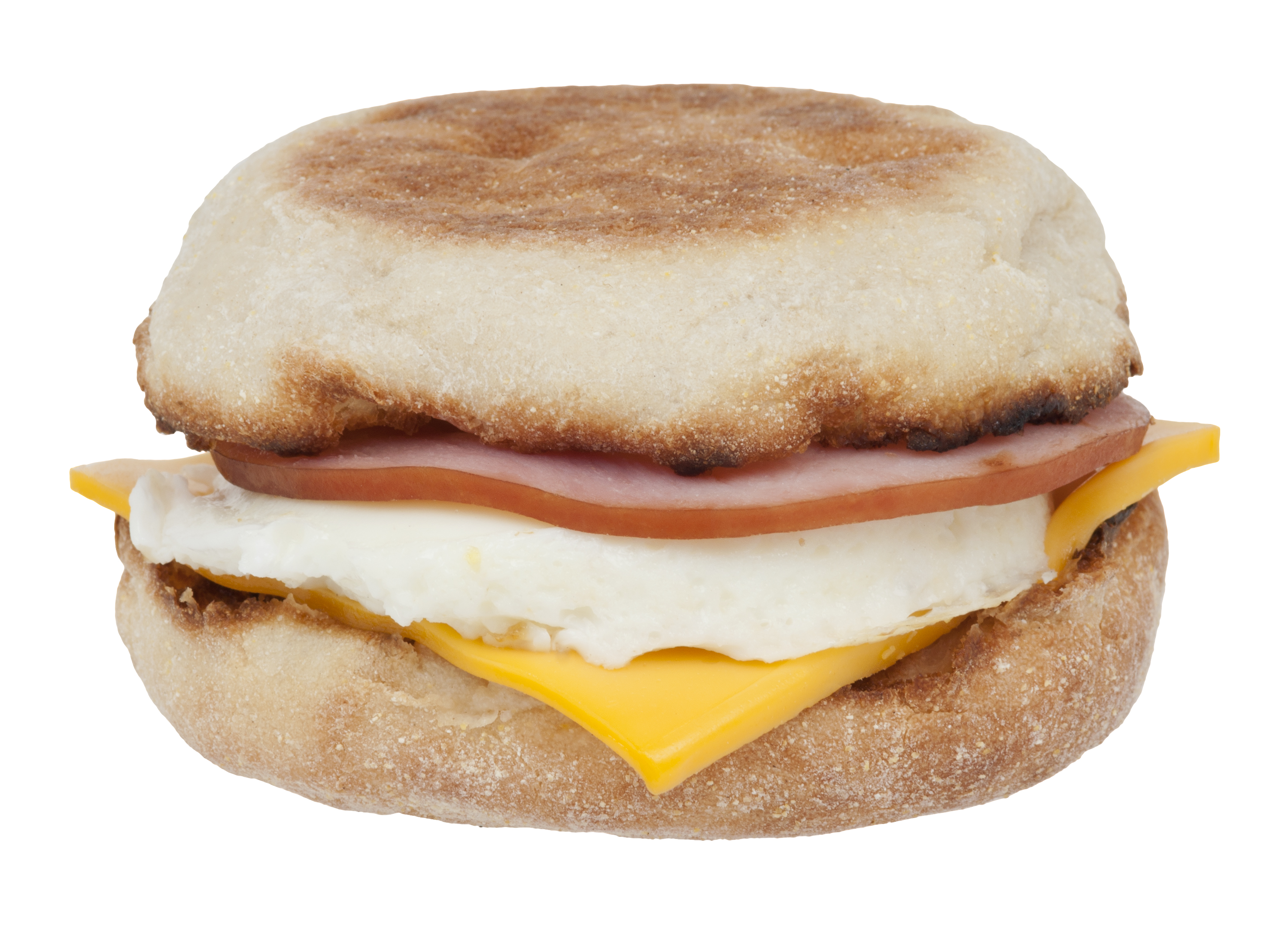
McDonald's Egg McMuffin, a bacon, egg and cheese sandwich using Canadian bacon

A bacon, egg, and cheese sandwich is a sandwich made with bacon, eggs (usually fried or scrambled), cheese, and bread, which may be buttered and toasted. The sandwich, usually eaten for breakfast, is popular in the United States and Canada. It is particularly culturally significant in New York City, where it is typically served on a kaiser roll.

It is sometimes abbreviated as BEC in the U.S.

== Variations ==
Many similar sandwiches exist, substituting alternative meat products for the bacon, or using different varieties of cheese or bread.

A typical sandwich with these ingredients has about 20 grams of fat and 350 kilocalories (1,500 kilojoules) of food energy. A version has been adapted to make a low-carbohydrate meal. In the United States, the bacon egg and cheese sandwich has also been modified into a prepackaged food product as a Hot Pocket (170 kcal or 710 kJ and 7 grams of fat) and a Lean Pocket (150 kcal or 630 kJ and 4.5 grams of fat).

== See also ==
- Bacon sandwich
- List of sandwiches
