= Herb Peterson =

American businessman (1919–2008)

Herb Petersen
- Born: Herbert Ralph Petersen; January 5, 1919; Chicago, Illinois, U.S.
- Died: March 25, 2008 (aged 89); Santa Barbara, California, U.S.
- Occupations: Businessman, Entrepreneur, early McDonald's restaurant franchisee
- Known for: Created the Egg McMuffin sandwich (1971)
- Spouse(s): Barbara (?-2008), his death
- Children: 3 daughters, and 1 son

Herbert Ralph Peterson (January 5, 1919 – March 25, 2008) was an American fast food advertising executive best known for inventing the McDonald's Egg McMuffin in 1972. The sandwich pushed McDonald's to expand into breakfast, which by 1993 accounted for an estimated 20–25% of the company's revenue.

== Early life ==
Herb Petersen was born and raised in Chicago. He served in the United States Marine Corps during World War II, where he attained the rank of major in three years.

== Career ==
Herb Petersen began his advertising career with McDonald's as vice president at D'Arcy Advertising in Chicago, which became McDonald's ad arm.

Peterson coined McDonald's first national advertising slogan, "Where Quality Starts Fresh Every Day."

He later became a franchise co-owner and the operator of six McDonald's restaurants in and around Santa Barbara, California.

Peterson developed the Egg McMuffin, which has become a McDonald's breakfast signature item, in 1972. Peterson was said to be fond of eggs benedict, so he worked to develop a breakfast item which was similar to it for the fast food chain. Peterson eventually came up with an egg sandwich consisting of an egg formed in a Teflon ring with its yolk broken, topped with grilled Canadian bacon and a slice of American cheese. The Egg McMuffin was served as an open faced sandwich on a buttered and toasted English muffin.

The Egg McMuffin was created and first sold at a McDonald's in Goleta, California, at a Fairview Avenue location which Peterson co-owned with his son, David.

== Death ==
Peterson died in Santa Barbara on March 25, 2008, at the age of 89. He was survived by his wife Barbara, son David and three daughters. A memorial service was held on April 23, 2008, in Montecito, California. Peterson is the grandfather of professional surfer Lakey Peterson.
