= Street Disco =

Restaurant and wine bar in Portland, Oregon, U.S.

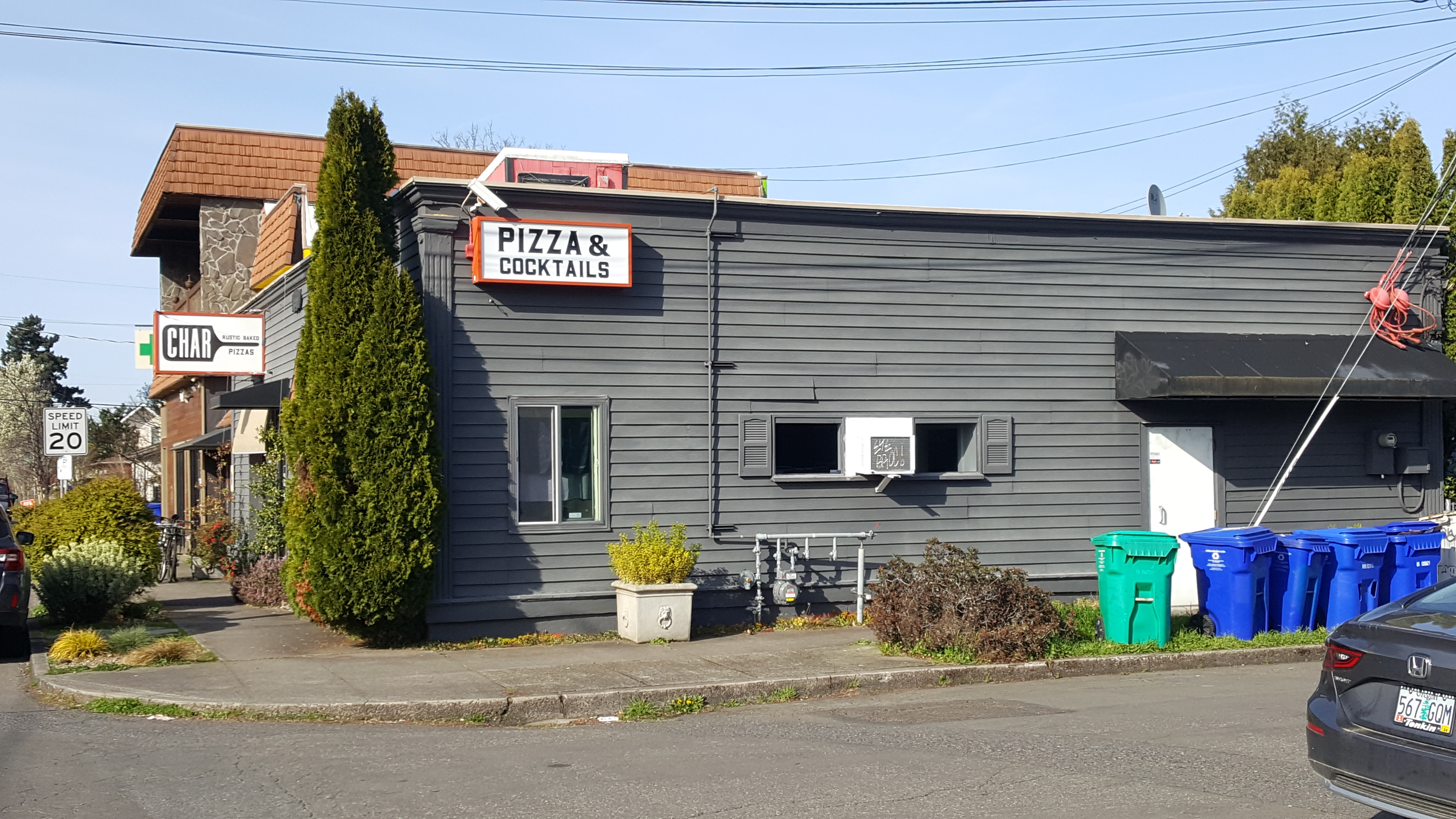
- Exterior of Char Pizza (pictured in 2022), which operated in the building later occupied by Street Disco
- Interactive map of Street Disco

Restaurant information
- Owners: Kyle Christy; Jessie Manning
- Location: 4144A Southeast 60th Avenue, Portland, Multnomah, Oregon, 97206, United States
- Coordinates: 45.4926°N 122.6016°W
- Website: street-disco.com

Street Disco is a restaurant and wine bar in Portland, Oregon, United States. Owners Kyle Christy and Jessie Manning started the business as a pop-up restaurant before moving into the brick and mortar space in southeast Portland's Foster-Powell neighborhood in 2022.

== Description ==
The restaurant and wine bar Street Disco operates on 60th Avenue, near Foster Road, in southeast Portland's Foster-Powell neighborhood. The interior has a dining area with booths and small tables, as well as a bar area with "serious retro vibes thanks to the arched painted brick windows and walls", according to Andrea Damewood of the Portland Mercury. The seating capacity is approximately sixty people.

The menu has included cheeseburger pizza, "bougie" versions of McGriddles, tacos al pastor with grilled octopus, lamb neck, steaks with cacio e pepe compound butter, and European-inspired options such as cavatelli with rabbit ragu and meatballs in tomato sauce. Seafood options include albacore tartare, canned fish with saltine crackers, and oysters on the half shell. For brunch, Street Disco has served omelettes with roe, "seafood towers", bourbon whiskey-fried chicken and waffles, espresso martinis, and drinks similar to an Orange Julius.

== History ==
Street Disco began as a food and wine pop-up restaurant, hosted in establishments Bar Dune and 5 & Dime. Street Disco is owned by former Dame head chef Kyle Christy and former Dame server Jessie Manning. As of mid 2022, Street Disco planned to open a brick and mortar restaurant in the space previously occupied by Char Pizza, in September. The restaurant opened on October 21, 2022.

Bakari Berry is a sous-chef. Street Disco has hosted pop-ups, including Native American restaurant Javelina and The Tender Carp in 2024.

== Reception ==
Following the restaurant's move into Foster-Powell, Andrea Damewood of the Portland Mercury wrote, "Street Disco, an industry fave pop-up, finally opened its brick-and-mortar this fall, and everything from the neighborhood (Foster-Powell), to the dishes (ever-changing and inventive), and the wine (tons by the glass, quirky) points to a sign that independent restaurants are back, baby. It's young, it's loud, it's a little crowded, and it's a lot of fun." Bon Appétit included Street Disco in a list of the seven "most exciting" new restaurants of October 2022. Christy and Manning were named "rising stars" by the trade publication StarChefs in 2023.

Nathan Williams and Janey Wong included Street Disco in Eater Portland's 2023 list of recommended restaurants in Foster-Powell. The website's Asia Alvarez and Brooke Jackson-Glidden included the business in a 2024 list of "foolproof first date spots for every kind of Portlander". They called the food "approachable" and "inventive", writing: "There's often something special going on at this jade-hued Foster-Powell restaurant, whether it's a pop-up, an Italian American night, or a collaborative dinner with another Portland spot. Even on the nights Street Disco runs its standard menu, however, you're still in for a treat." In 2024, Jackson-Glidden and Rebecca Roland included Street Disco in Eater Portland's overview of the city's "next-level" restaurants for brunch, and the business was included in a list of Portland's 38 best eateries.
