= Kangaroo Brands =

American food manufacturing company

Kangaroo Brands is an American food manufacturing company specializing in frozen breakfast sandwiches. It is headquartered in Milwaukee, Wisconsin. Kangaroo Breads and Sandwich Bros. are two brands that stemmed from Kangaroo Brands.

== History ==
Brothers John and George Kashou founded Kangaroo Brands in 1979 to create a bread alternative which was patented in 2004 as Pita Pocket Bread. Kangaroo distributes to retailers nationwide.

A US patent for "Omelet in a pita pocket bread" was granted to George Kashou in 2010. A Canadian patent was also granted in 2010.

In 2005, Kangaroo Brands launched a pita chip division. The pita chip division was sold to ConAgra Brands in 2012.

Also in 2005, George Kashou teamed up with Froedtert and Community Health and wrote the first edition of The Pocket Diet book with co-author Caitlyn Lorenze.

Salem Kashou became President of Kangaroo Brands in 2016.

On December 21, 2017, ConAgra Brands announced plans to acquire Sandwich Bros. of Wisconsin, a Milwaukee-based maker of frozen flatbread sandwiches. The deal was expected to close in early 2018, subject to regulatory approval. Financial terms were not disclosed.

On February 5, 2018, ConAgra Brands completed the acquisition of Sandwich Bros. of Wisconsin.[7]

The Sandwich Bros plant was sold for $87 million. On April 2, 2021, ConAgra Brands closed the Kangaroo/Sandwich Bros. plant in Milwaukee, eliminating 190 jobs.
