= Chlebíček =

Open-faced sandwiches

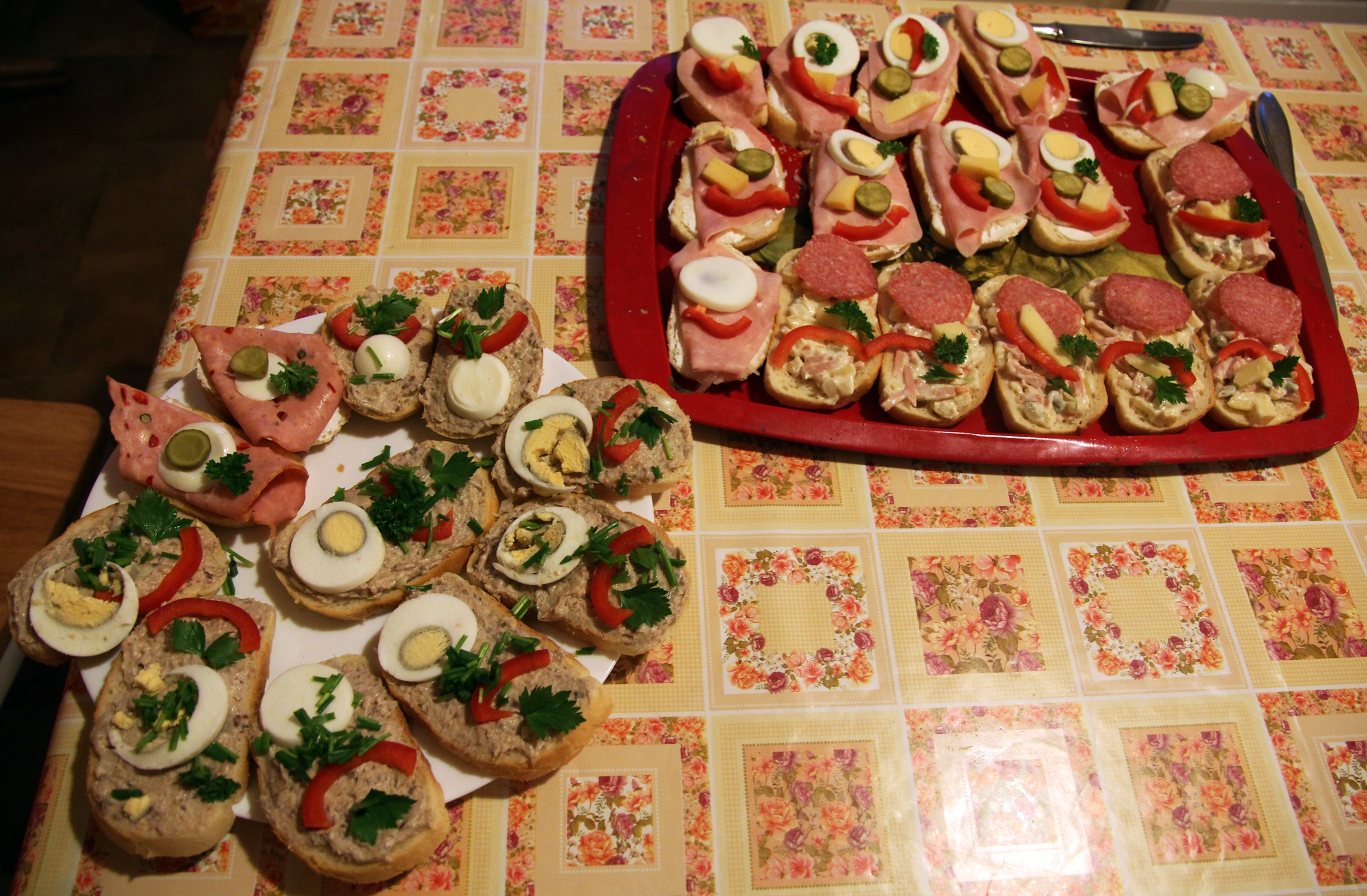
Chlebíčeks are an appetizer or snack.

Obložený chlebíček or just chlebíček (lit. 'little bread') is a dish in Czech and Slovak cuisines also common in other former Austro-Hungarian countries. It is a type of open sandwich with various toppings and garnishes. It is often served as an appetizer dish or as a snack.

== Overview ==
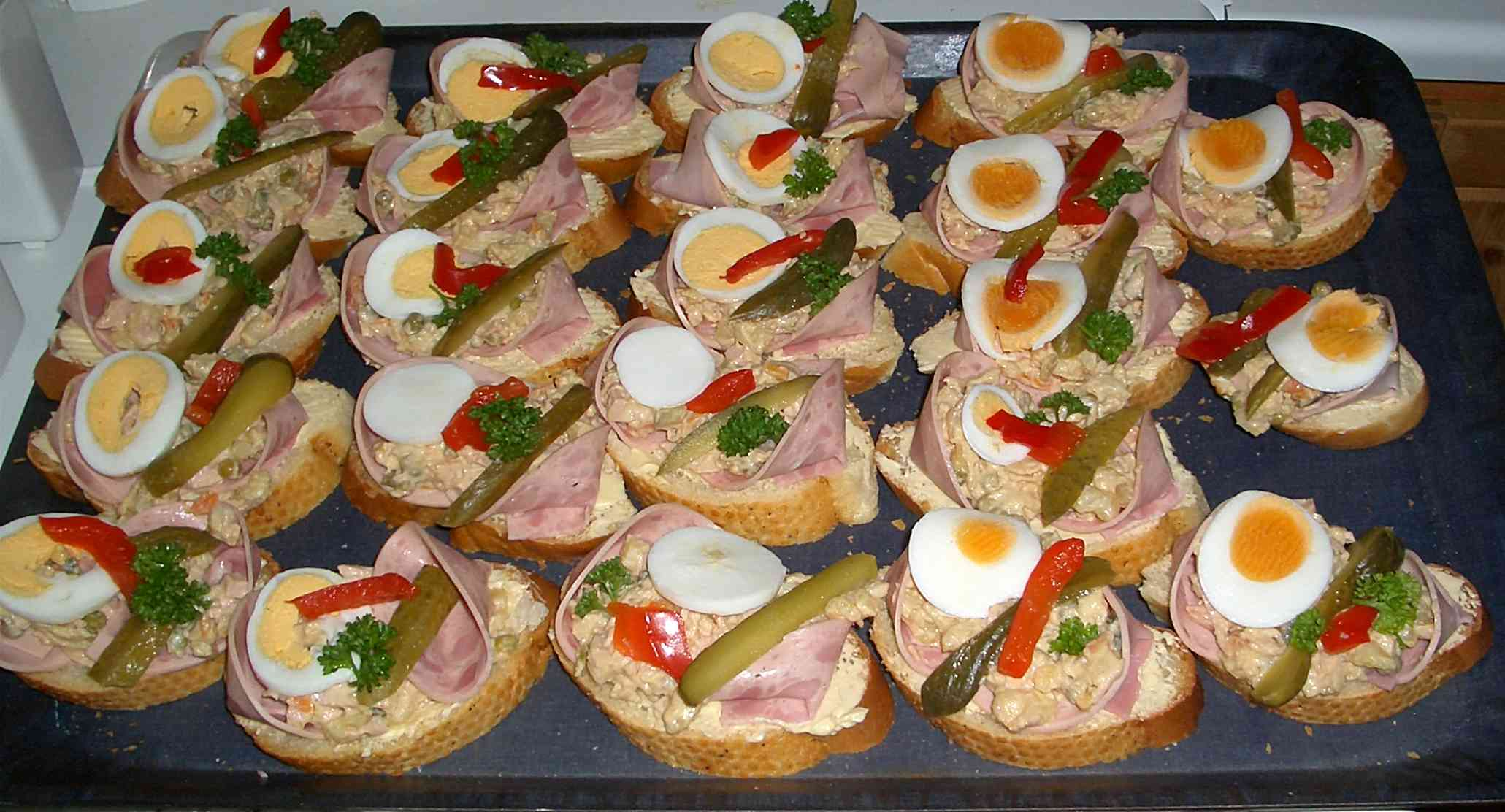
Chlebíček prepared with a spread, ham, hard-boiled egg, red bell pepper, pickle and parsley

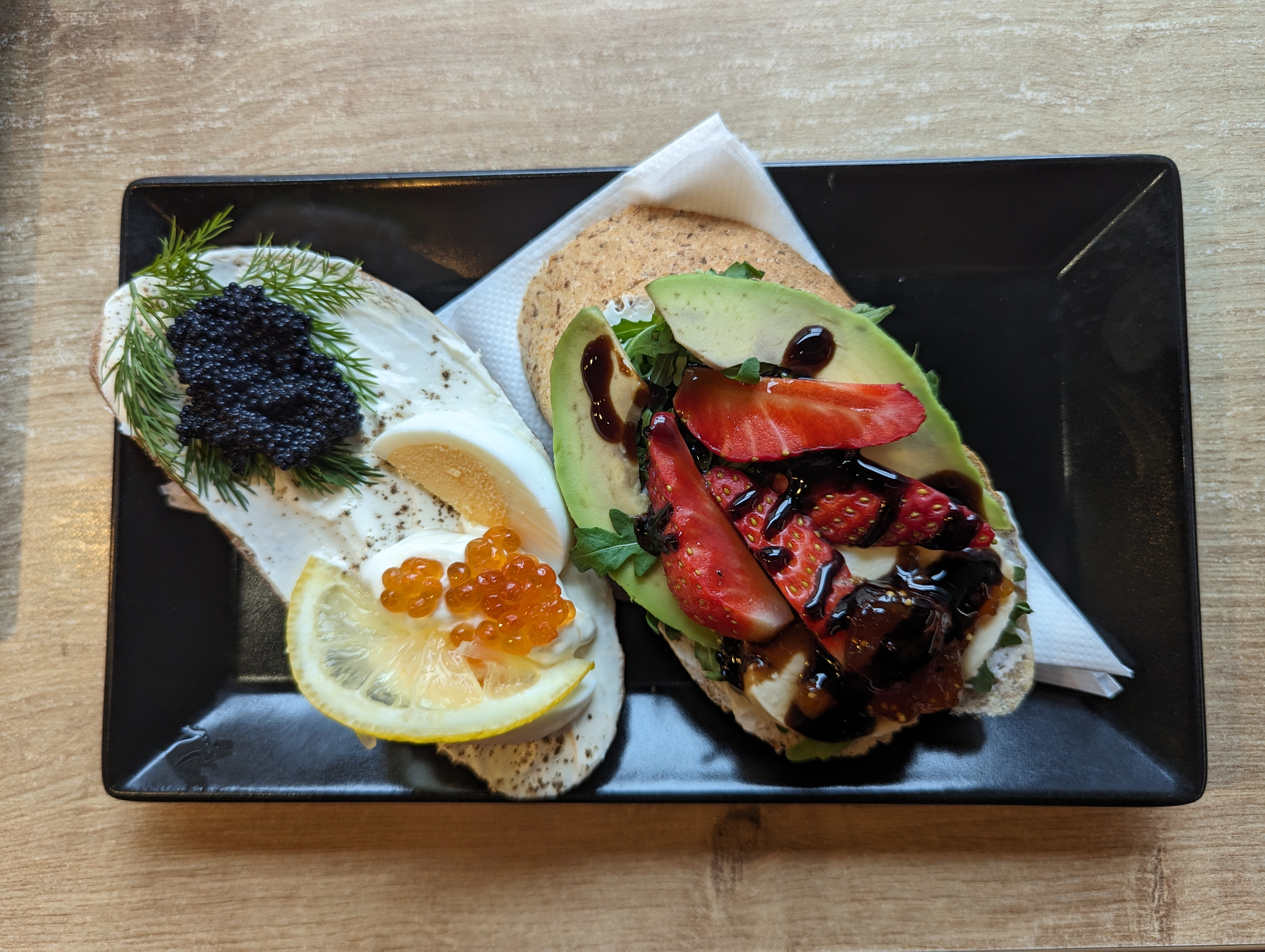
Fancy variations

Chlebíček is a type of open sandwich. It consists of sliced bread that has butter or another kind of spread on it, atop which a variety of toppings may be added. Toppings used on chlebíček include various cured meats such as ham, salami and sausage, sliced hard-boiled egg, cheeses, cream cheese, cucumber, tomato, fish paste, salads and various spreads prepared with meat, vegetables or cheeses. Some vegetables such as bell pepper, pickle, tomato, radish and parsley may be used as a garnish. Veka or baguette bread may be used in their preparation. They are sometimes sold as a snack food at food stalls during festivals and in bars.

== Origin ==
Chlebíčeks date to the year 1916, when the famous Paukert's Deli Store was founded at Národní boulevard in Prague. The original salami and egg variant, called Paukert, was made famous during the First Czechoslovak Republic.

== See also ==
- List of hors d'oeuvre
- List of sandwiches
