= Bacon sandwich =

Sandwich of cooked bacon

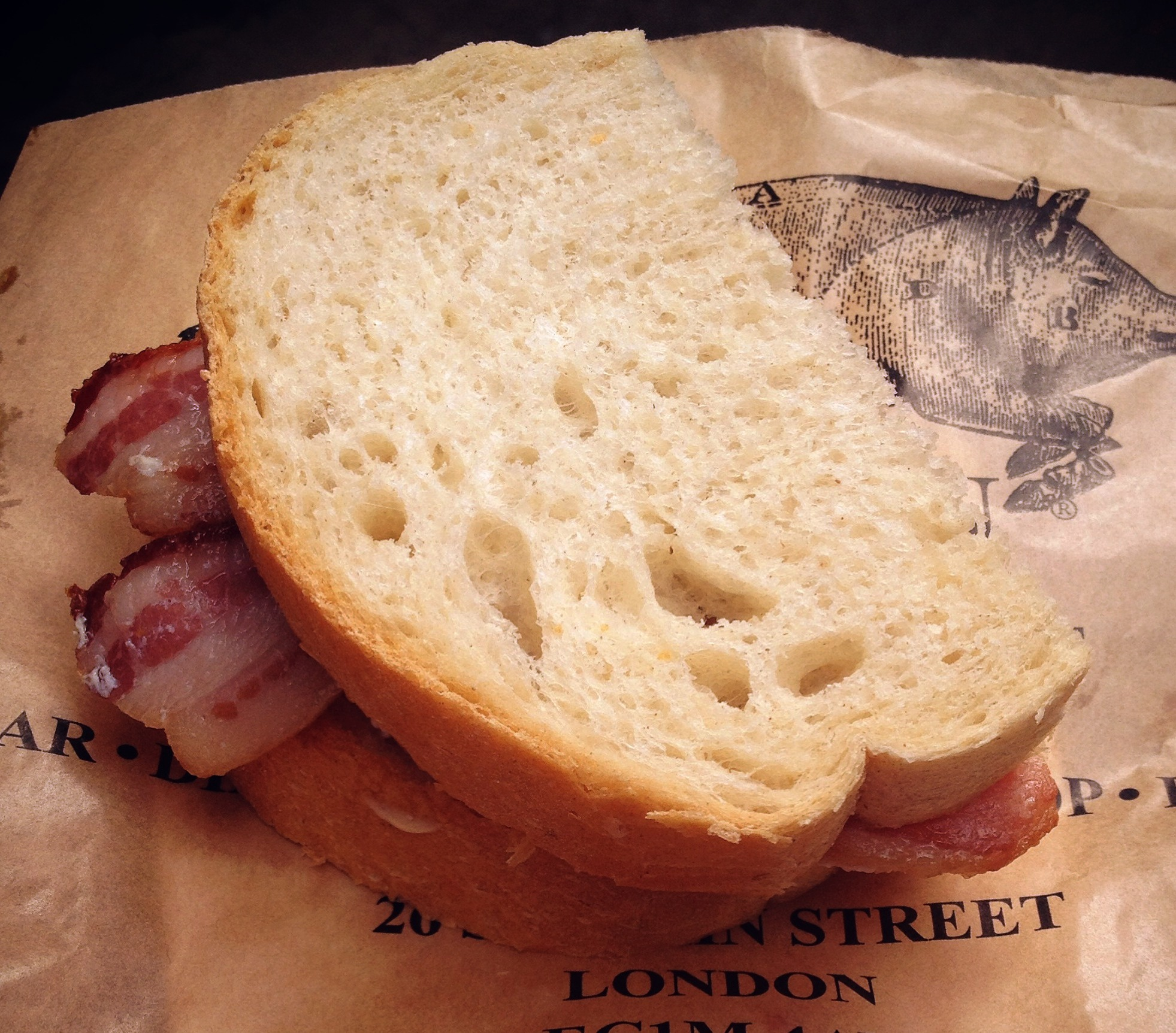
- A bacon sandwich
- Alternative names: Bacon butty, bacon sarnie, rasher sandwich, bacon cob, bacon barm, bacon muffin, rasher sandwich
- Type: Sandwich
- Place of origin: United Kingdom
- Serving temperature: Hot
- Main ingredients: Bread and bacon, with a condiment, often tomato ketchup or brown sauce
- Variations: BLT

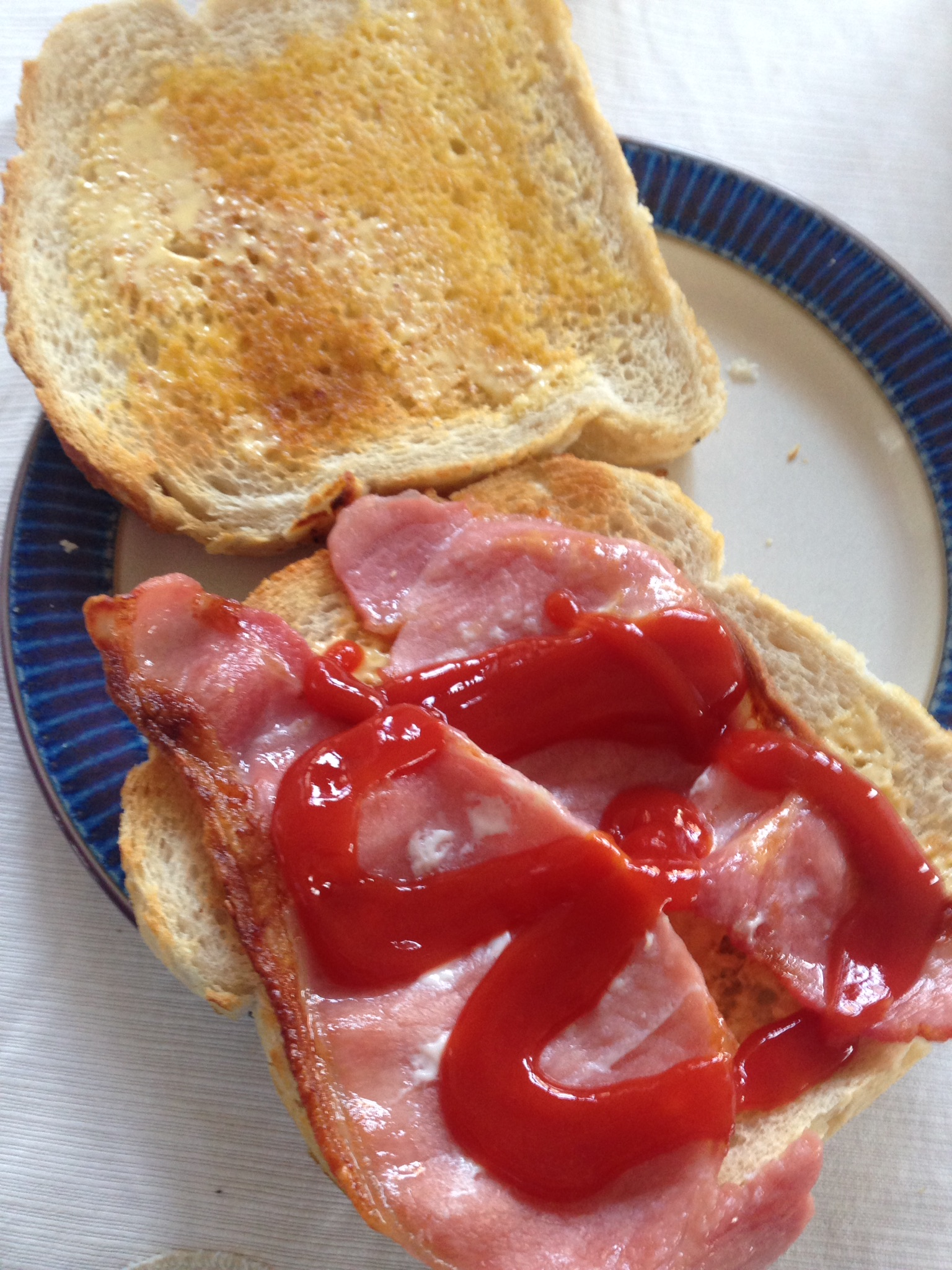
A toasted bacon sandwich with butter and tomato ketchup

A bacon sandwich (also known in parts of the United Kingdom and New Zealand as a bacon butty, bacon bap, bacon cob, or bacon sarnie) is a sandwich of cooked bacon. It may be spread with butter, and may be seasoned with brown sauce or tomato ketchup. It is generally served hot. In some establishments the sandwich will be made from bread toasted on only one side, while other establishments serve it on a similar roll as is used for hamburgers.

Bacon sandwiches are an all-day favourite throughout the United Kingdom and Ireland. They are often served in British cafes and delis, and are anecdotally recommended as a hangover cure.

== Variants ==
In 2007, researchers at Leeds University evaluated 700 variants of the sandwich, experimenting with different cooking styles, types of bacon, breads, oils, and special additions. Each variant was then ranked by 50 tasters. In conclusion, the best bacon sandwiches are made with "crispy, fried, and not-too-fat bacon between thick slices of white bread."

Another study by the Direct Line for Business listed the top additions to the traditional bacon butty in England. Although the original was still the preferred sandwich, the next top contender was the "breggy" which adds an egg. The next-most-popular accessory was mushrooms, followed by cheese. For sauces, brown sauce was slightly favoured over ketchup. However, food writer Felicity Cloake recommends neither, favouring marmalade and mustard instead.

The BLT is a popular variant of the bacon sandwich with the additional ingredients of lettuce and tomato, but typically served cold.

Bacon is a common ingredient in breakfast sandwiches, with the bacon, egg and cheese sandwich as a particularly common variation in New York City.

Fool's Gold Loaf is a sandwich made by the Colorado Mine Company, a five-star restaurant in Denver, Colorado. The sandwich consists of a single warmed, hollowed-out loaf of bread filled with one jar of creamy peanut butter, one jar of grape jelly, and a pound of bacon.

== See also ==
- Breakfast sandwich
- Bacon, egg and cheese sandwich
- BLT
- Club sandwich
- Chip butty
- Ed Miliband bacon sandwich photograph
- List of sandwiches
- Peameal bacon sandwiches
