= McMuffin =

Breakfast sandwich sold by McDonald's

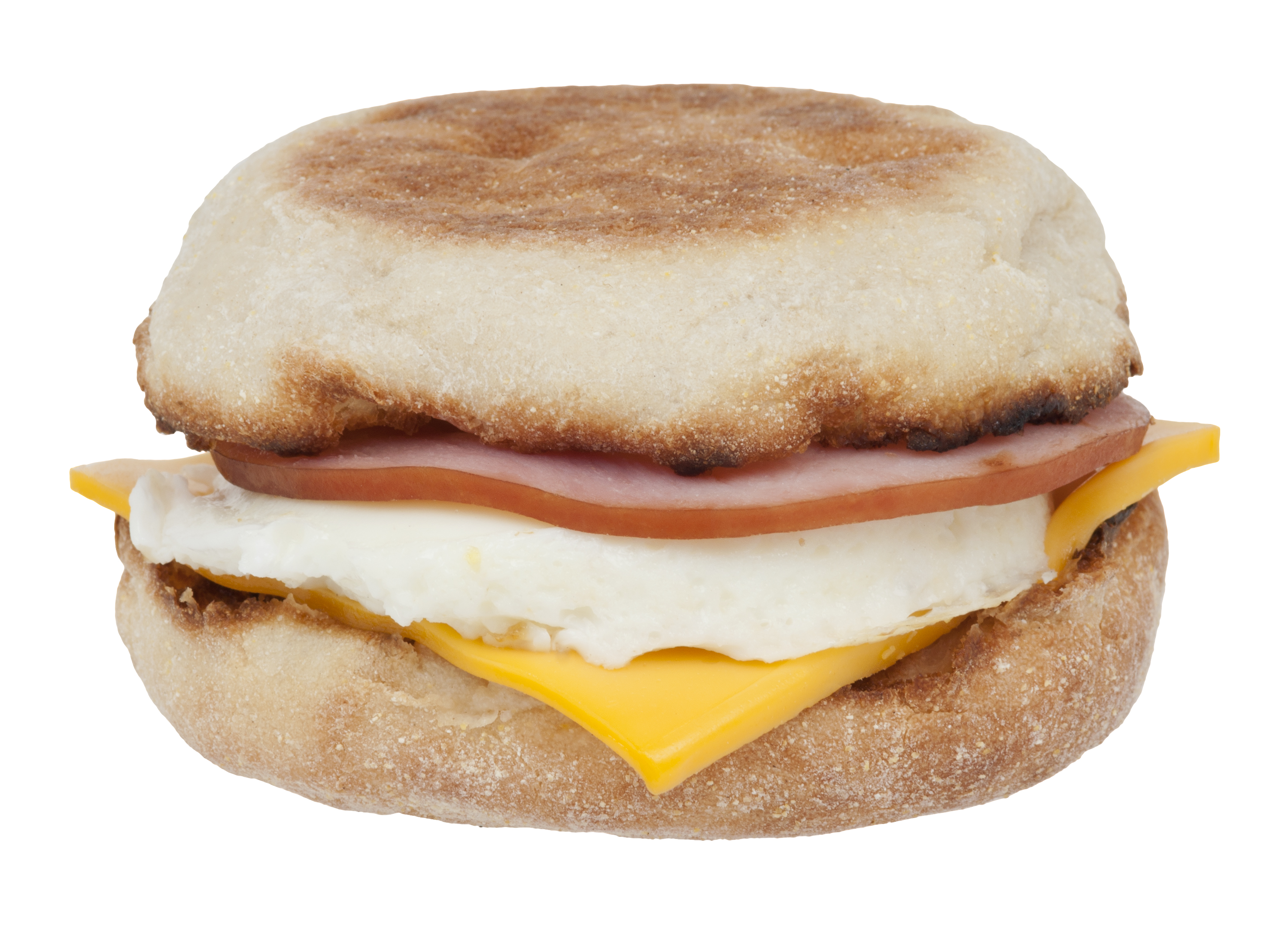

Nutritional value per 1 sandwich, 7.1 oz (200 g)
- Energy: 300 kcal (1,300 kJ)
- Carbohydrates: 30 g (10%)
- Sugars: 16 g
- Dietary fiber: 2 g (8%)
- Fat: 18 g (37%)
- Saturated: 5 g (24%)
- Trans: 0^{†}
- Protein: 18 g
Vitamins and minerals
Vitamins	Quantity %DV^{†}
Vitamin A equiv.	10% 90 μg
Vitamin C	0% 0 mg
Vitamin E	0% 0 mg
Minerals	Quantity %DV^{†}
Calcium	23% 300 mg
Iron	14% 2.5 mg
Sodium	36% 820 mg
- Other constituents: Quantity
- Energy from fat: 110 kcal (460 kJ)
- Cholesterol: 260 mg (80%)
- May vary outside US market.^† Zero indicates no significant measurable trace.
- ^{†}Percentages estimated using US recommendations for adults. Source: McDonald's Nutritional Facts

McMuffin is a family of breakfast sandwiches sold by the international fast food restaurant chain McDonald's. The Egg McMuffin is the signature sandwich, which was invented in 1972 by Herb Peterson to resemble eggs benedict, a traditional American breakfast dish with English muffins, Canadian bacon, eggs and hollandaise sauce.

== Product description ==
In the United States and Canada the standard McMuffin consists of a slice of Canadian bacon, a griddle-fried egg, and a slice of American cheese on a toasted and buttered English muffin. The round shape of the egg is achieved by cooking it in a ring mold.

Versions with sausage and chicken instead of Canadian bacon and egg, named respectively Sausage McMuffin and Chicken McMuffin, were released alongside the original. The Sausage and Egg McMuffin, a version of the Sausage McMuffin with an egg, is also popular. The McGriddles are a variant of the McMuffin with a scrambled egg flap and American cheese between two maple-flavored griddle pancakes, with the same variants as the McMuffin.

There is also a vegetarian version named "McMuffin Egg & Cheese", in countries like France and Germany. Since 2019, it is available all day long in France.

== History ==
The sandwich was invented in 1972. Former McDonald's President Ray Kroc wrote that Herb Peterson and his assistant, Donald Greadel, the operator of a McDonald's Santa Barbara franchise in Goleta, California, asked Kroc to look at something, without giving details because it was:

... a crazy idea — a breakfast sandwich. It consisted of an egg that had been formed in a Teflon circle with the yolk broken, and was dressed with a slice of cheese and a slice of grilled ham. It was served open-faced on a toasted and buttered English muffin. The advent of the Egg McMuffin opened up a whole new area of potential business for McDonald's, the breakfast trade.

The first McDonald's corporate-authorized Egg McMuffin was served at the Belleville, New Jersey, McDonald's in 1972.

== See also ==
- Croissan'wich
- List of sandwiches
