= Beef tongue =

Food made from cow tongue

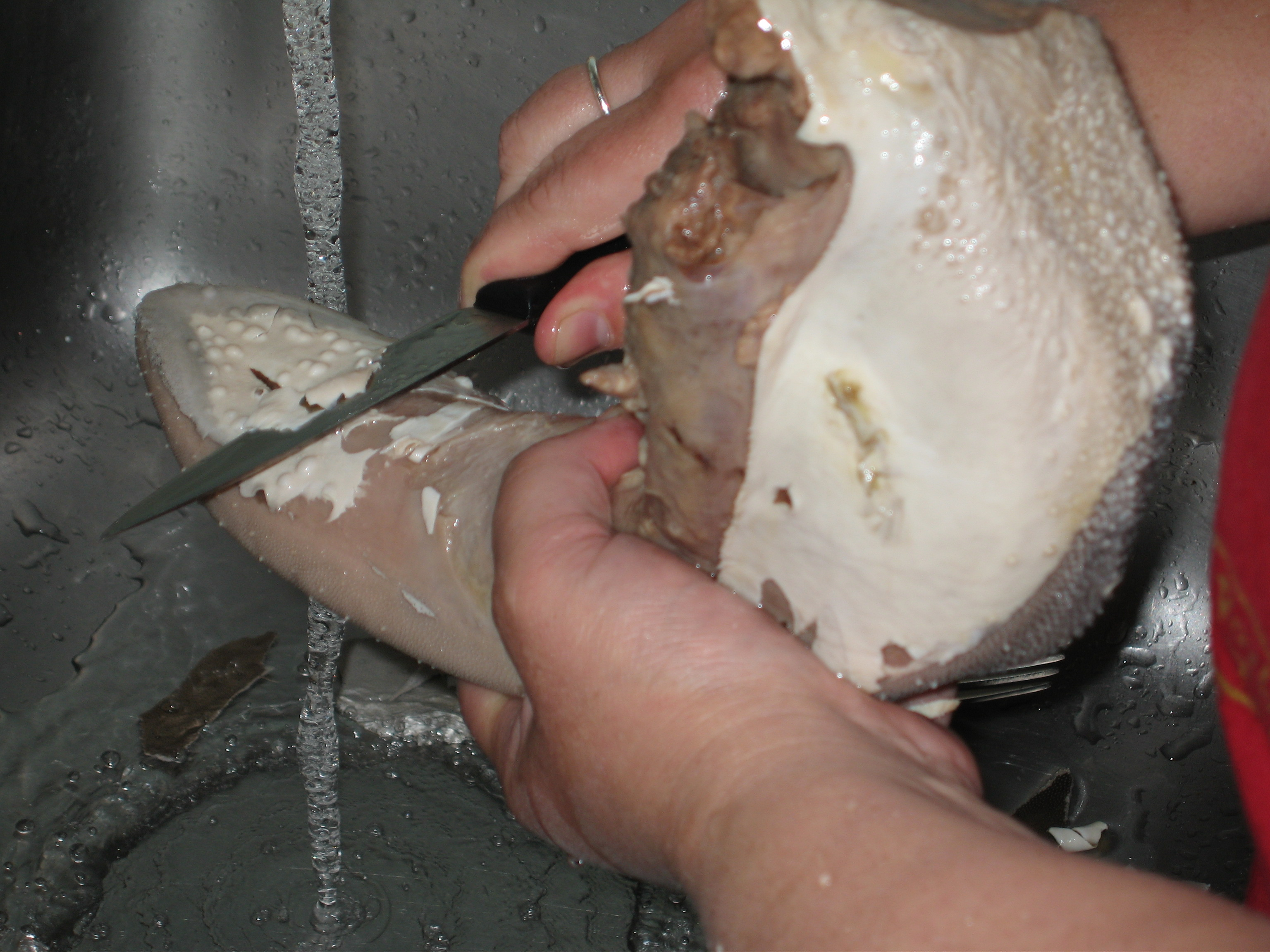
Removing skin from boiled beef tongue

Beef tongue (also known as neat's tongue or ox tongue) is a cut of beef made of the tongue of a cow. It can be boiled, pickled, roasted or braised in sauce. It is found in many national cuisines, and is used for taco fillings in Mexico and for open-faced sandwiches in the United Kingdom. In France and Belgium it is served with Madeira sauce, while chrain is the preferred accompaniment in Ashkenazi and Eastern European cuisines. Germans make white roux with vinegar and capers, or horseradish cream, which is also popular in Polish cuisine.

Beef tongue is very high in fat, which contributes up to 72% of its caloric content. Some countries, including Canada and specifically the province of Alberta, export large quantities of beef tongue.

== Preparation ==
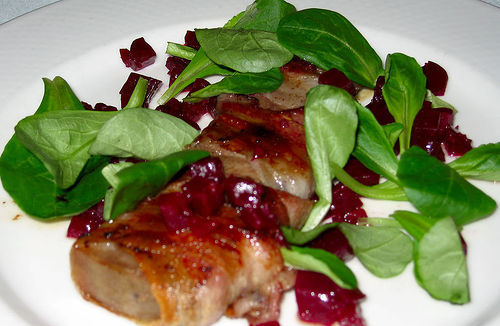
Tongue and pancetta with mâche

Beef tongue is often seasoned with onion and other spices, and then placed in a pot to boil. After it has cooked the skin is removed. Pickled tongue is often used because it is already spiced. If cooked in a sauce, it can then later be reused as a sauce for meatballs or any other food item.

Another method of preparing beef tongue is to scald it in hot water, remove the skin, and then roast it in the oven while making a gravy with the pan drippings.

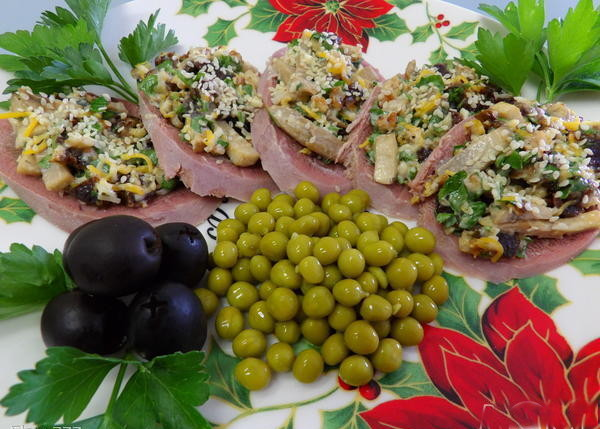
Russian zakuski: cold cuts of tongue topped with mushrooms, cheese, nuts and prunes

Beef tongue is used in North America as a major ingredient of tongue toast, an open-faced sandwich prepared for breakfast, lunch, or dinner and sometimes offered as an hors d'oeuvre. It is widely used in Mexican cuisine, and often seen in tacos and burritos (lengua). In Puerto Rican cuisine, lengua al caldero, pot roast tongue, and lengua rellena, braised stuffed tongue, are both served with pique criollo.

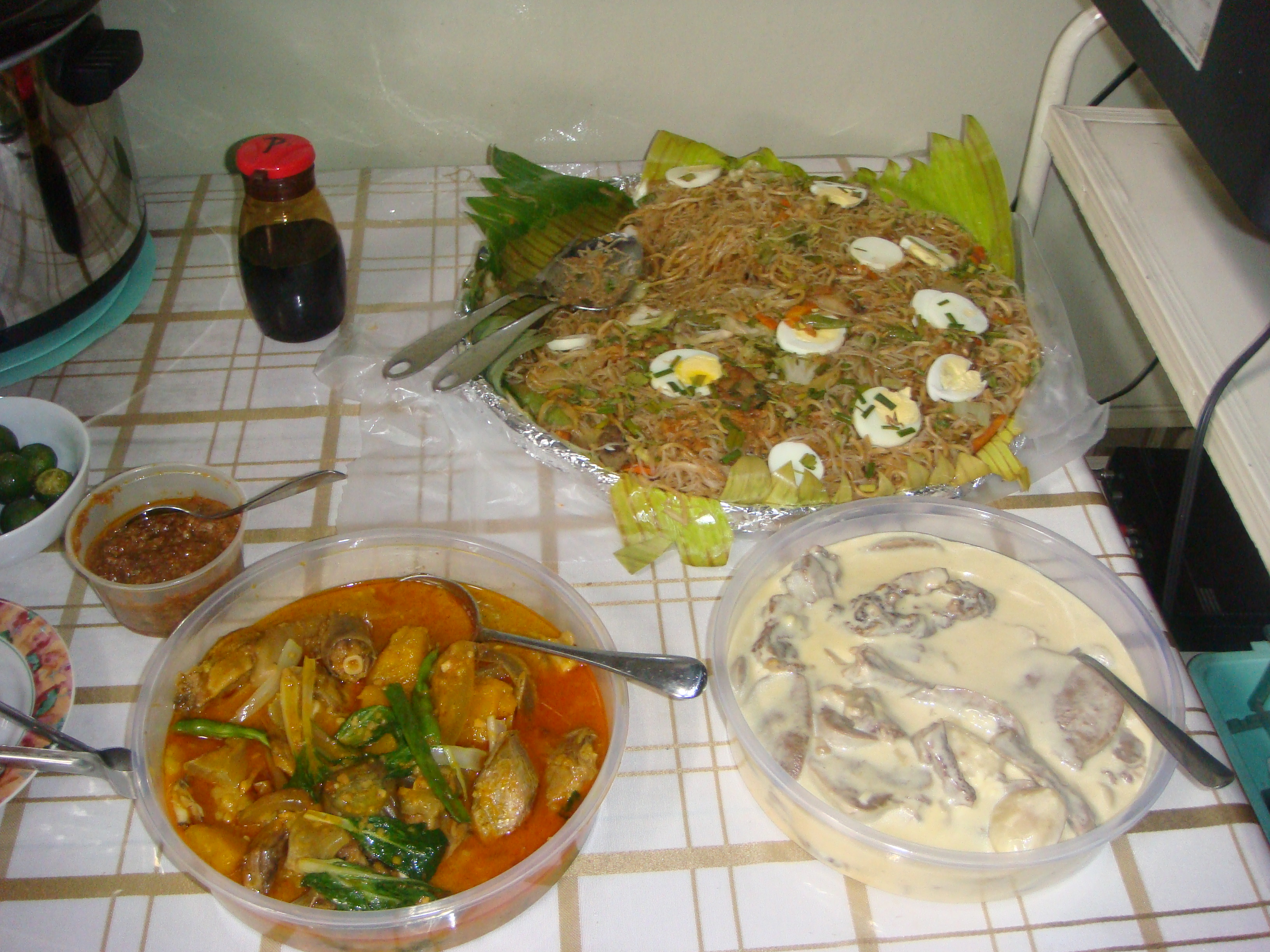
Filipino dishes: kare-kare, lengua with white sauce and pancit canton-bihon

In France and Belgium, boiled beef tongue is often prepared with mushrooms in a Madeira sauce but can also be served with a vinaigrette. In Ashkenazi Jewish, Russian and Ukrainian cuisine, boiled tongue is often served with chrain. Beef tongue or veal tongue is also found in classic recipes for Russian salad. In Austria, Germany, Czechia and Poland, it is commonly served either with chrain or with horseradish cream sauce. The traditional Berlin or North German variant adds capers and vinegar to the sauce based on the broth with white roux.

In Japanese cuisine, the dish gyūtan, originating in the city of Sendai, is made of grilled tongue.

Also, tongue is a part of Albanian, Argentine, Brazilian, Bulgarian (tongue with butter), British, French, Indonesian (semur lidah or beef tongue stew), Italian (typical dish in Piemonte, Liguria and Veneto), Colombian, Chinese (braised), Japanese, Kenyan, Korean (hyeomit gui), Filipino, Lithuanian, Latvian, Norwegian, Mexican, Mongolian, Nicaraguan, Persian (as forms of fried, roasted, boiled and eaten cold in a sandwich), Polish, Portuguese, Romanian, Spanish, South African, Turkish, and Uruguayan cuisine.

== See also ==
- List of beef dishes
- Foreleg, cheeks and maw
