= Felicity Cloake =

English food writer

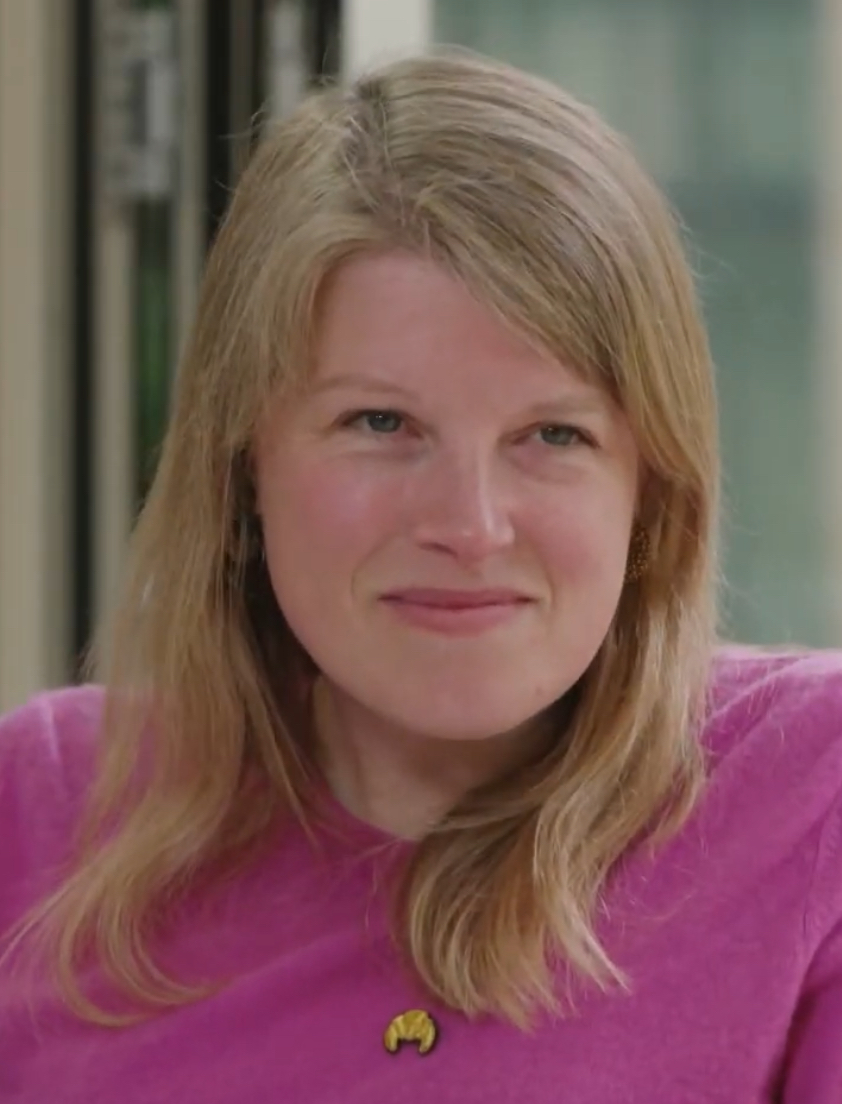
- Cloake in 2021
- Born: 1982 or 1983 (age 43–44); Hertfordshire
- Education: St Peter's College, Oxford
- Occupation: Food writer
- Writing career
- Language: English
- Notable work: How to cook the perfect... (column in The Guardian)
- Website: felicitycloake.com

Felicity Cloake (born 1982 or 1983) is an English food and travel writer, and a novelist. She writes for The Guardian and the New Statesman. She came to prominence writing a weekly column for The Guardian.

Her books include The A–Z of Eating: A Flavour Map for the Adventurous Cook (2016), Completely Perfect (2018), One More Croissant for the Road (2019), and Red Sauce, Brown Sauce: A British Breakfast Odyssey (2022).

== Early life ==
Cloake grew up in Hertfordshire; her father was a John Lewis executive and her mother taught French. She has Irish heritage on her maternal side. Cloake attended Rugby School before studying English at St Peter's College, Oxford. She began her writing career in the Oxford Student.

== Career ==
Cloake is best known for her weekly How to cook the perfect... column in The Guardian, starting online in 2009 and then in print, where she attempts to create the best possible version of a popular dish. She sparked a minor controversy in 2022 when she recommended garnishing bacon butties with marmalade rather than the traditional condiments of brown sauce or ketchup.

She has published a series of cookbooks based on her Guardian column, including Perfect, Perfect Too, Perfect Host, and Completely Perfect. In 2019 she published her first travelogue, One More Croissant for the Road, describing her 3,500 km bicycle journey around France in search of the perfect croissant. In 2022 she published a sort of sequel, Red Sauce, Brown Sauce, in which she cycles around Great Britain sampling breakfast foods.

She has also appeared on television as guest host on Great British Menu in 2015. In October 2020, Cloake hosted an online livestream event in conversation with food writer Grace Dent for The Guardian.

Her first novel, The Underdog, was published in 2026.

== Books ==
- — (2011). Perfect: 68 Essential Recipes For Every Cook's Repertoire. London: Fig Tree. ISBN 9781905490837. OCLC 747915329.
- — (2013). Perfect Host: 162 Easy Recipes For Feeding People and Having Fun. Photographed by Joe Woodhouse. Fig Tree. ISBN 9780241145692. OCLC 879333191.
- — (2014). Perfect Too: 92 More Essential Recipes For Every Cook's Repertoire. London: Fig Tree. ISBN 9780241003121. OCLC 868378302.
- — (2016). The A–Z of Eating: A Flavour Map for the Adventurous Cook. Photographed by Helen Cathcart. London: Fig Tree. ISBN 9780241003138. OCLC 948790165.
- — (2018). Completely Perfect: 120 Essential Recipes for Every Cook. London: Penguin. ISBN 9780241377826. OCLC 1053855037.
- — (2019). One More Croissant for the Road. Harper Collins. ISBN 978-0008304935. OCLC 1035749288.
- — (2022). Red Sauce, Brown Sauce: A British Breakfast Odyssey. Harper Collins. ISBN 978-0008413651.
- — (2025). Peach Street to Lobster Lane: Coast to Coast in Search of Real American Cuisine. Harper Collins. ISBN 978-0008687656.
- — (2026). The Underdog. Fourth Estate. ISBN 978-0008695293.

== Awards ==
- New Media of the Year Award, Guild of Food Writers, 2011
- Food Journalist of the Year Award, Guild of Food Writers, 2011
