= Tongue toast =

Open sandwich of beef tongue and eggs

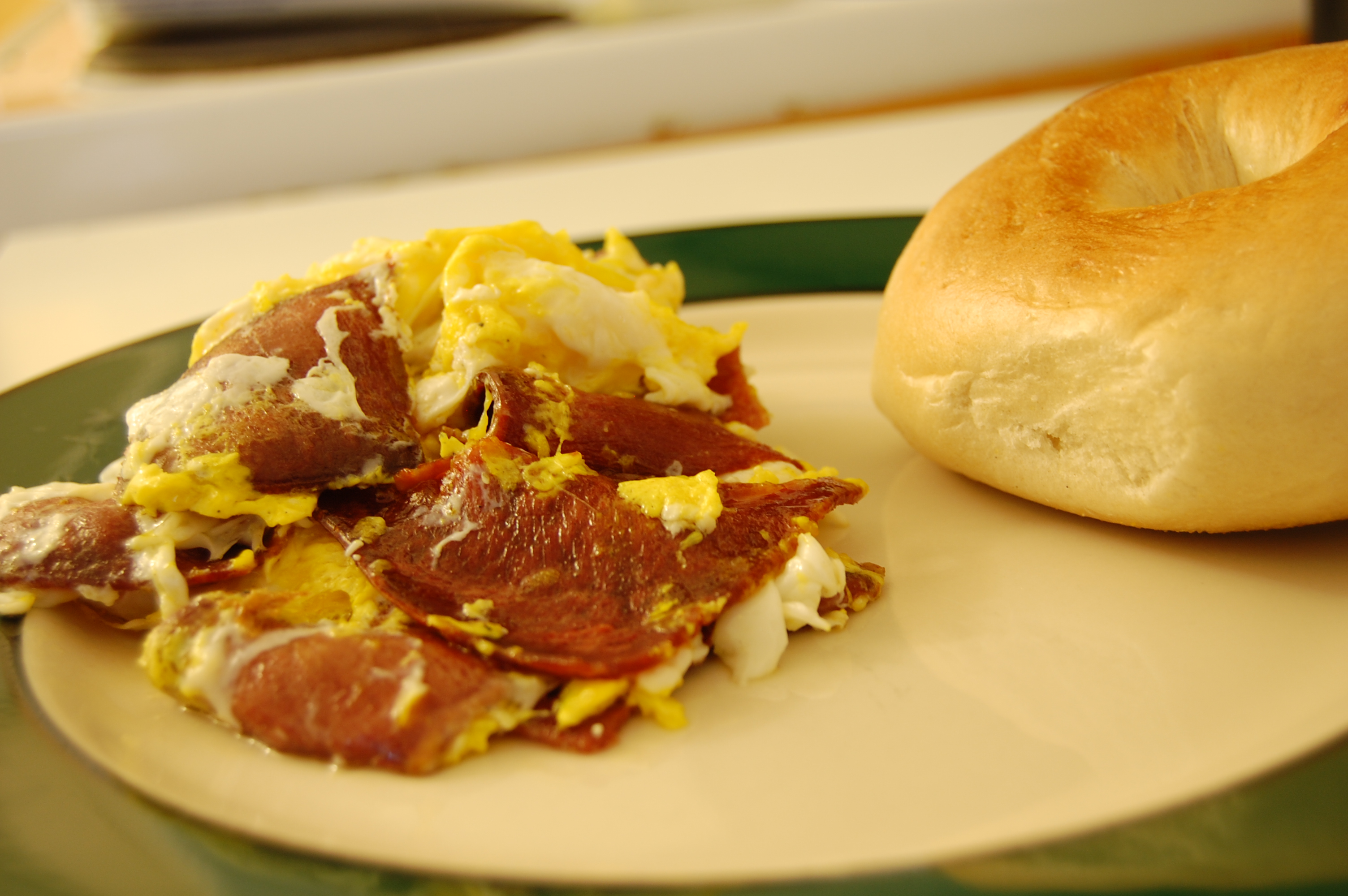
- Type: Open sandwich
- Course: Breakfast or hors d'oeuvre
- Main ingredients: Bread, beef tongue, scrambled eggs, onions

Tongue toast is a traditional open sandwich prepared with sauteed beef tongue and scrambled eggs. It is seasoned to taste with black pepper and onions. The tongue is sometimes served on buttered toast with a poached egg instead of a scrambled one. While it was primarily prepared as a dish for breakfast, the meal can also be eaten for lunch and dinner.

A variant served for breakfast involved the use of boiled, smoked beef tongue, cream, scrambled egg, and seasoned to taste with nutmeg, pepper, chopped parsley, and chopped green peppers. A modern variant involved the use of reindeer tongue instead of beef tongue.

Tongue toast was also served as an hors d'oeuvre, prepared in a similar fashion to a French toast preparation, as a star-shaped appetizer stamped out of buttered toast with mustard butter added to it.

== See also ==
- List of sandwiches
- List of toast dishes
