= McGriddles =

Breakfast sandwich sold by McDonald's

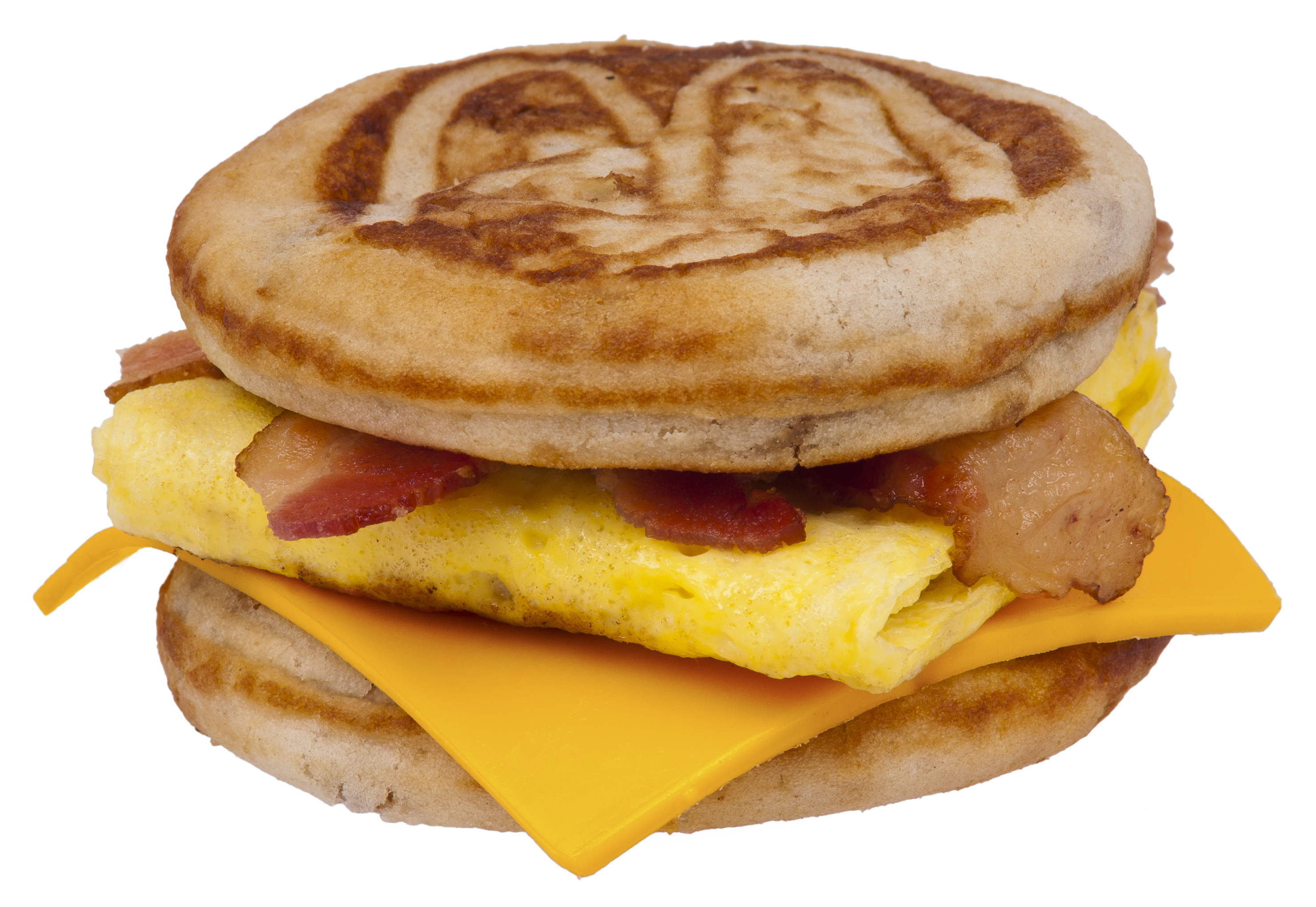
- A bacon, egg & cheese McGriddle

Nutritional value per 1 sandwich (175 g)
- Energy: 450 kcal (1,900 kJ)
- Carbohydrates: 48 g (16%)
- Sugars: 15 g
- Dietary fiber: 2 g (10%)
- Fat: 21 g (32%)
- Saturated: 9 g (45%)
- Trans: 0 g
- Protein: 19 g
Vitamins and minerals
Vitamins	Quantity %DV^{†}
Vitamin A	410 IU
Vitamin C	7% 6 mg
Minerals	Quantity %DV^{†}
Calcium	15% 190 mg
Iron	14% 2.5 mg
Sodium	54% 1240 mg
- Other constituents: Quantity
- Cholesterol: 230 mg (76%)
- Energy from fat: 190 kcal (790 kJ)
- May vary outside US market
- ^{†}Percentages estimated using US recommendations for adults.

The McGriddles sandwich (colloquial singular form McGriddle) is a type of breakfast sandwich sold by the international fast food restaurant chain McDonald's. Introduced in 2003, it is available in the following markets: United States, Canada, Japan, Guatemala, Mexico, Philippines, Hong Kong, Ireland, United Kingdom, and as of 2026 New Zealand.

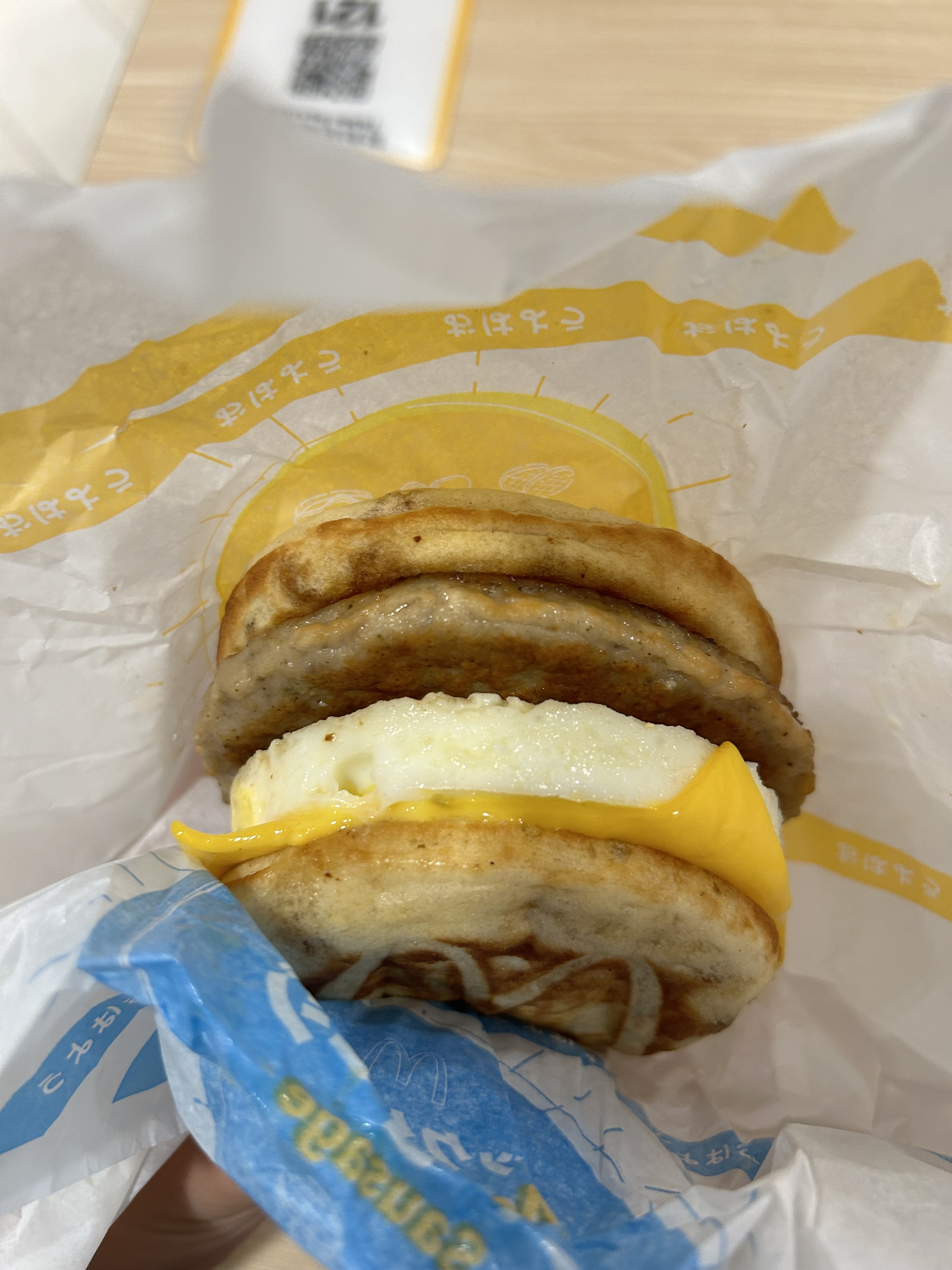
A Sausage, Egg & Cheese McGriddle sold in Hong Kong

== Product description ==
The standard McGriddles sandwich consists of fried bacon, a round egg or folded scrambled egg depending on the region, and American cheese between two maple-flavored griddle pancakes embossed with the McDonald's logo.

=== Variants ===
- Sausage
- Sausage, egg, and cheese
- Bacon, egg, and cheese
- Spam, egg and cheese (served in Hawaii)
- Chicken (initially for a limited-time trial in Kansas, Ohio, and Florida; available across the U.S. as of 2025)

== History ==
The McGriddles was conceptualized in 1999 by Gerald Tomlinson, at the time executive chef of McDonald's, as a variant of the McMuffin series with pancakes. A technology patented by a supplier which allowed the crystallization of syrup was necessary for production, where the crystals are mixed and heated to ensure all syrup goes into the pancakes. The product was introduced in June 2003.

== See also ==
- McMuffin
- List of McDonald's products
- List of sandwiches
