= Breakfast sandwich =

Sandwich with breakfast foods

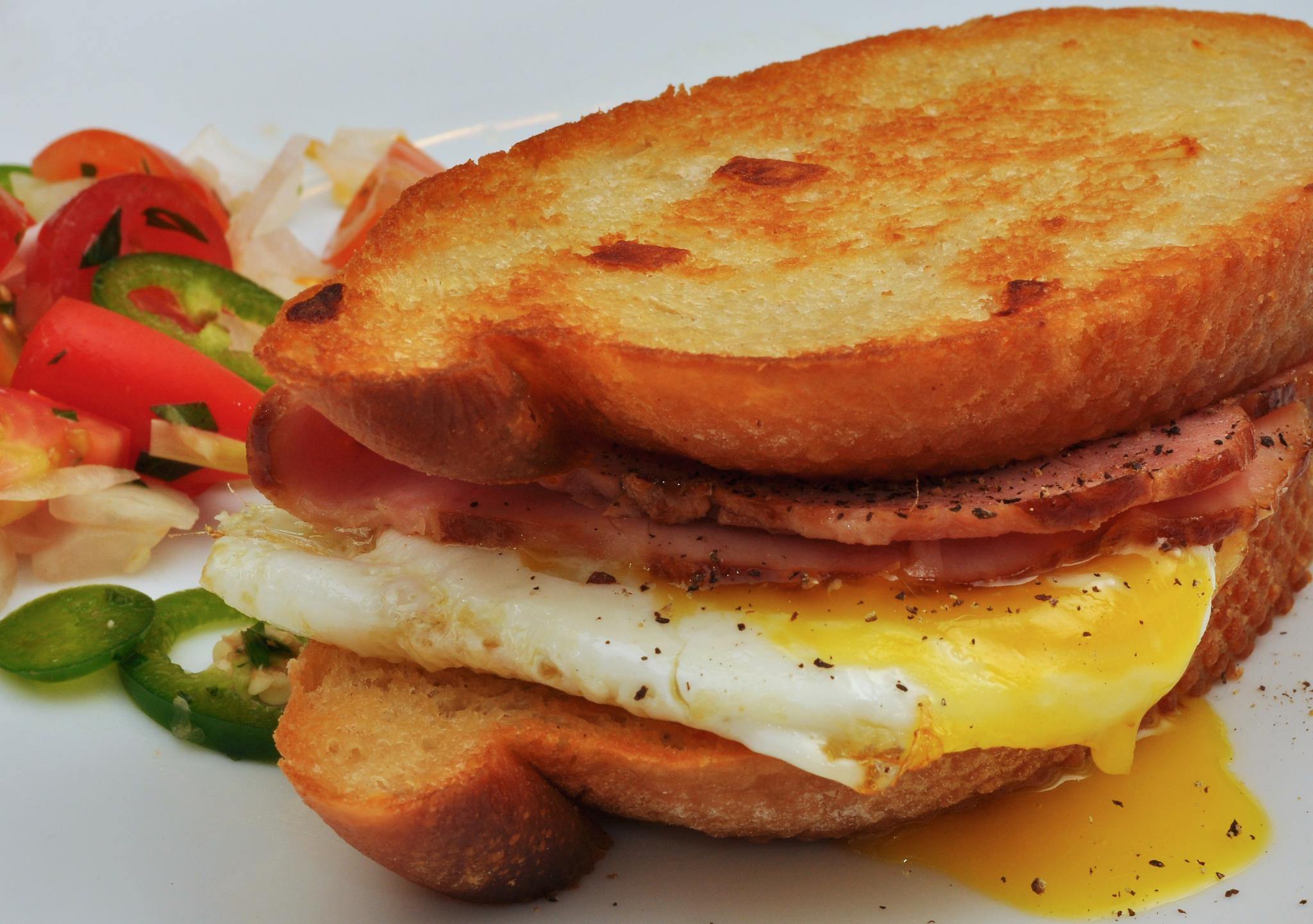
- A breakfast sandwich on sourdough bread
- Type: Sandwich
- Main ingredients: Bread; breakfast meats; eggs; cheese; spices

A breakfast sandwich is any sandwich filled with foods associated with breakfast. Breakfast sandwiches are served at fast food restaurants and delicatessens, sold in supermarkets, and commonly made at home. Different types of breakfast sandwich include the bacon sandwich, the egg sandwich, the sausage sandwich, and various combinations like the bacon, egg and cheese sandwich. The breakfast sandwich is related to the breakfast roll.

== Overview ==
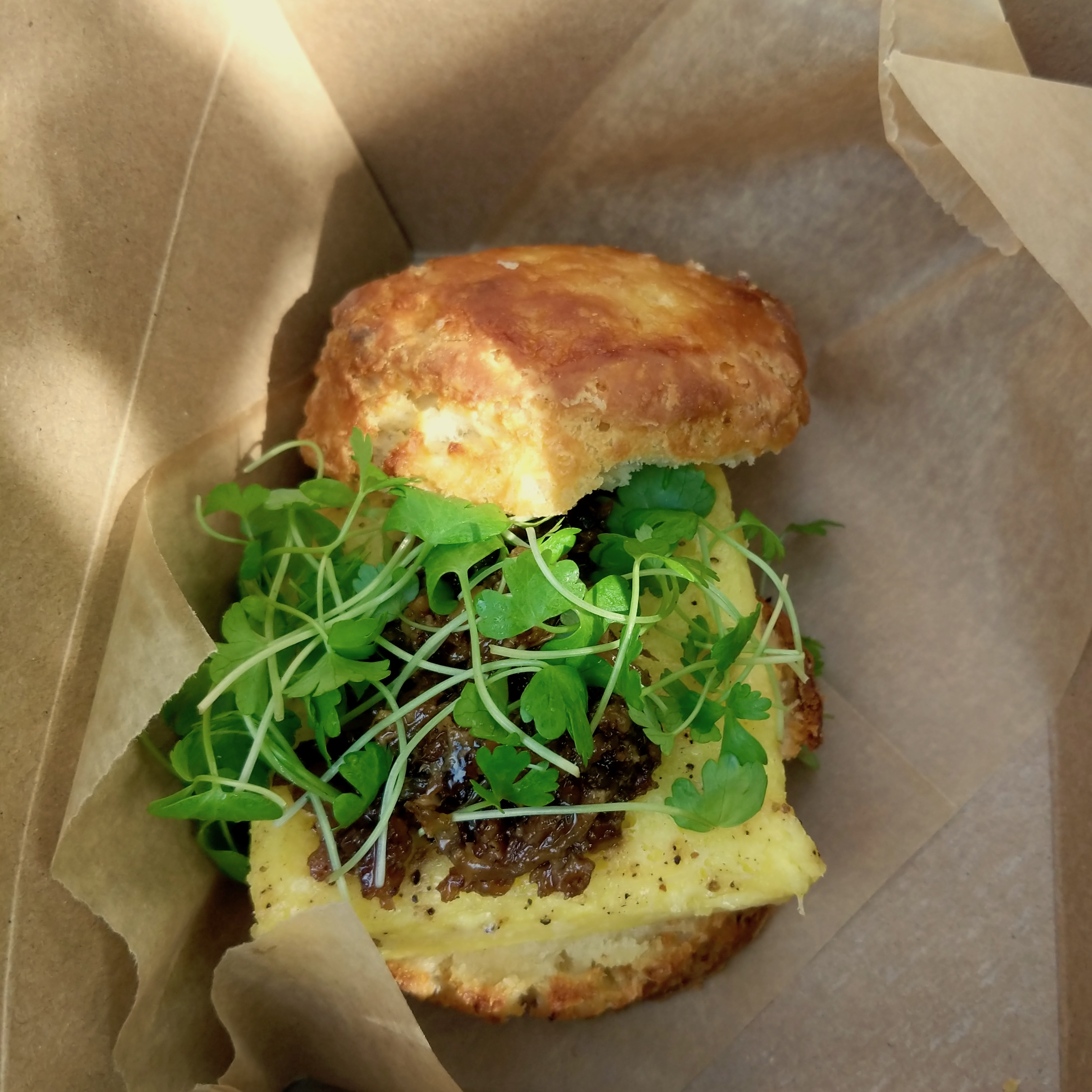
A breakfast sandwich featuring eggs, bacon jam, and microgreens on a buttermilk biscuit

Breakfast sandwiches are typically made using breakfast meats (generally cured meats such as sausages, patty sausages, bacon, country ham, scrapple, Spam, and pork roll), breads, eggs and cheese. These sandwiches were typically regional specialties until fast food restaurants began serving breakfast. Because the common types of bread, such as biscuits, bagels, and English muffins, were similar in size to fast food hamburger buns, they made an obvious choice for fast food restaurants. Unlike other breakfast items, they were perfect for the innovation of the drive-through. These sandwiches have also become a staple of many convenience stores.

== History ==
Although the ingredients of the breakfast sandwich have been common elements of breakfast meals in the English-speaking world for centuries, it was not until the 19th century in the United States that people began regularly eating eggs, cheese, and meat in a sandwich. Sandwiches with eggs, which would later become known as "breakfast sandwiches", became increasingly popular after the American Civil War, and were a favorite food of pioneers during American westward expansion. The first known published recipe for a "breakfast sandwich" was in an 1897 American cookbook.

== Types of bread used ==
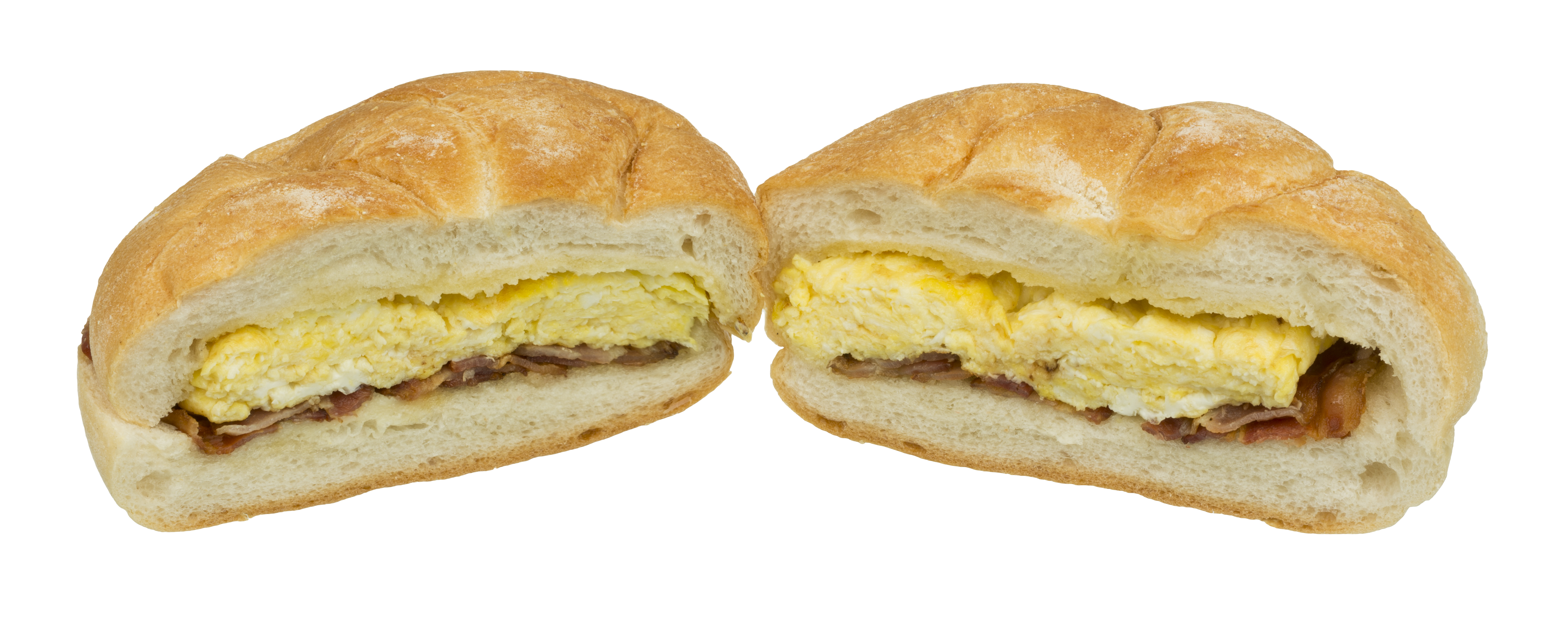
A New-York–style bacon and egg sandwich on a roll

There are several types of bread used to make breakfast sandwiches:

- Hard roll: The traditional breakfast sandwich of New York, New Jersey, and Connecticut consists of a hard roll; eggs; cheese; and sausage, bacon, or ham. This is considered one of the earliest forms of the breakfast sandwich in the United States. In New Jersey, a common breakfast sandwich is the Jersey breakfast which consists of pork roll, egg, and cheese on a hard Kaiser roll. In Ireland, a breakfast roll contains fillings such as sausages, bacon, white or black pudding, butter, mushrooms, tomatoes and tomato sauce or brown sauce. In some cases a hash brown or fried egg may be added; these fillings vary between cooks and restaurants.
- Biscuit: Consists of a large sliced biscuit, on which meat, cheese, or eggs are served. Popular biscuits include: Sausage biscuit, bacon, tomato, and country ham. Some fast food restaurants serve small fried chicken fillets on biscuits. Scrambled eggs and/or American cheese are often added.
- Bagel sandwiches: Due to their connection with German and Jewish ethnic groups, bagel sandwiches often have fillings that are popular in these communities. Deli meats, Canadian bacon, lox or other smoked fish, and cream cheese are popular.
- English muffin: Generally contains egg and cheese with either breakfast sausage or ham. Often served in US fast food outlets such as McDonald's and Starbucks.
- Toast: Toasted bread is one of the oldest forms of breakfast sandwich, and the closest to the original sandwich in form. While a variety of items can be served on toast, eggs and bacon are the most commonly associated with breakfast.
- Specialty breads: Burger King uses a croissant to make a breakfast sandwich marketed as the Croissan'wich, or as a croissant sandwich in some regions. McDonald's offers its traditional biscuit fillings on sandwiches made from maple-flavored pancakes called McGriddles. Dunkin' Donuts has a waffle sandwich that is similar to the McGriddles. These can be found at American fast food franchises worldwide. Kangaroo Brands makes a variety of breakfast sandwiches with pita bread.

== See also ==
- Breakfast burrito
