= Open sandwich =

Single slice of bread with food items on top

- Scandinavian smørrebrød at a cafeteria in Norway
- Alternative names: Open-face sandwich, open-faced sandwich, tartine, bread baser, bread platter
- Type: Sandwich
- Main ingredients: Bread, topping
- Variations: Many variations exist

An open sandwich, also known as an open-face/open-faced sandwich, bread baser, bread platter or tartine, consists of a single slice of bread or toast with one or more food items on top. It has half the number of slices of bread compared to a typical closed sandwich and has toppings rather than fillings.

== History ==
During the start of the Middle Ages, thin slabs of coarse bread called "trenches" (late 15th century English) or, in its French derivative, "trenchers", were used as plates. At the end of the meal, the food-soaked trencher was eaten by the diner (from which the expression "trencherman" may come), or perhaps fed to a dog or saved for beggars. Trenchers were as much the harbingers of open-face sandwiches as they were of disposable crockery.

A direct precursor to the English sandwich may be found in the Netherlands of the 17th century, where the naturalist John Ray observed that in the taverns, beef hung from the rafters "which they cut into thin slices and eat with bread and butter laying the slices upon the butter". These explanatory specifications reveal that the Dutch belegde boterham, open-faced sandwich, was as yet unfamiliar in England.

== Terminology ==
In countries like Denmark, where smørrebrød is common, smørrebrød is not considered a form of sandwich; rather, a sandwich is considered a form of smørrebrød with an extra piece of bread on top. In a US context, open sandwiches are sandwiches that are made with only a single slice of bread. It has given rise to some controversy in the philosophy of language study of meaning underdetermination after a judge had to consider whether a burrito was a sandwich for the purposes of enforcing an exclusive use clause in an American legal case. The judge followed the definition of Merriam-Webster's Dictionary: "two thin pieces of bread, usually buttered, with a thin layer (as of meat, cheese or savory mixture) spread between them." Because the burrito was "typically made with a single tortilla," the judge said it was not a sandwich.

== Presentation ==
Open sandwiches allow for an arrangement of different types of sandwiches to be served with afternoon teas or as an accompaniment to salads. They can be cut into fancy shapes of triangles, stars, rounds and crescents, and arranged in an attractive platter for presentation. Common ingredients for open sandwiches are jam, stuffed olives, chopped herbs, cream cheese, hard-boiled eggs and pimiento. Any ingredients can be used to add flavor and color to enhance the presentation of the sandwich platter.

== In various countries ==
An open sandwich is a slice of fresh bread or, e.g. in Germany, a bread roll half, with different spreads, butter, liver pâté, cheese spreads, cold cuts such as roast beef, turkey, ham, bacon, salami, beef tongue, mortadella, head cheese or sausages like beerwurst or kabanos, fish such as smoked salmon, gravadlax, herring, eel and bell pepper, tomato, radish, scallion and cucumber.

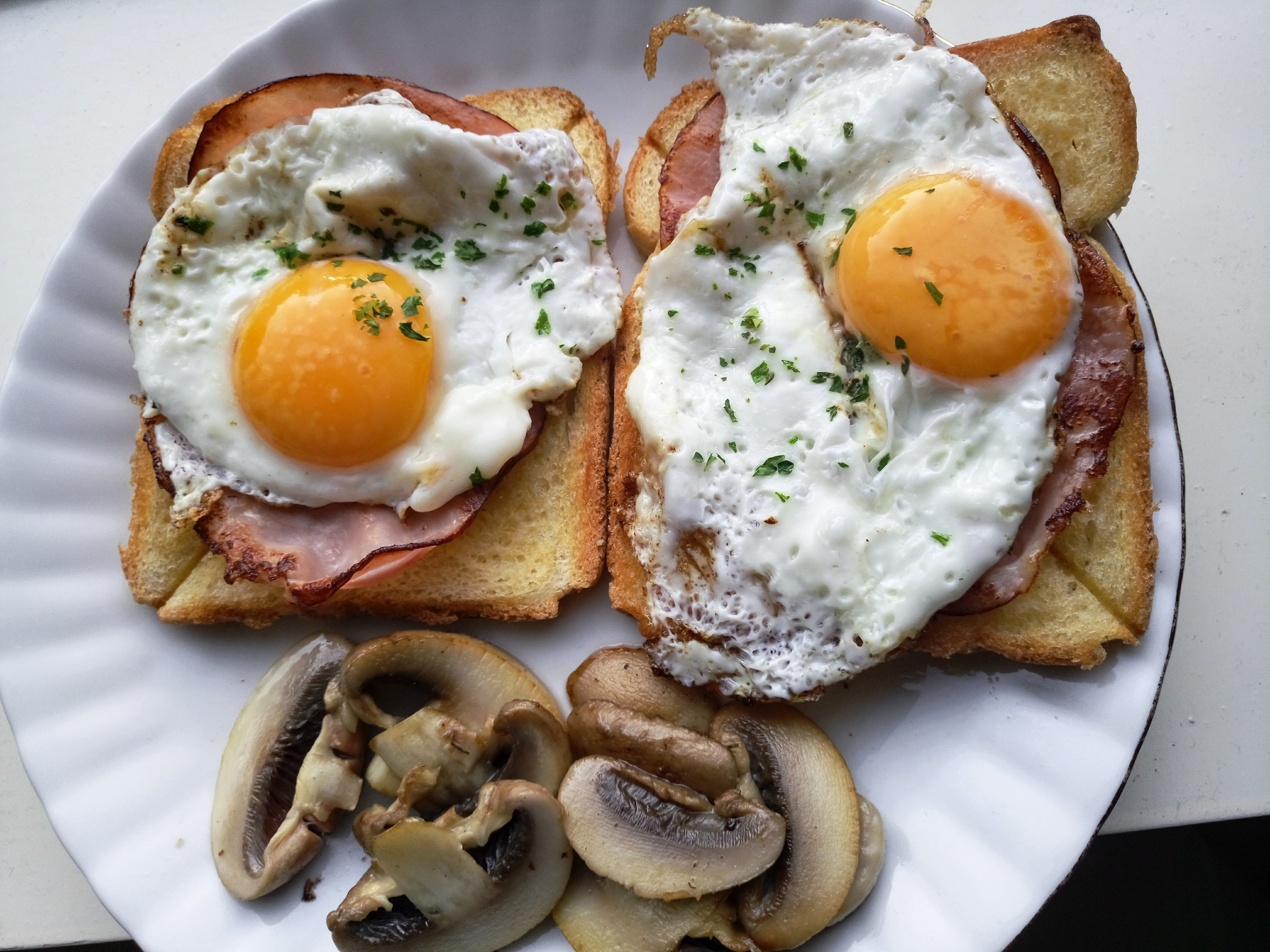
A Dutch ham and egg open sandwich with sliced mushroom

Open sandwiches like this are consumed in France, Belgium, Denmark, Norway, Sweden, Finland, Estonia, Austria, Germany, the Czech Republic, Hungary, the Netherlands, Poland and Bulgaria as well as other parts of Europe, and North America as a regular breakfast and supper food item. The American tongue toast was offered as an entrée for breakfast, lunch, and supper and as an hors d'œuvre for formal parties.

In former Czechoslovakia, a popular type of open sandwich is called obložené chlebíčky (pl., sg. obložený chlebíček) - slantways cut slice of veka (long narrow white bread) spread with butter or with various combinations of mayonnaise salads and hard boiled egg, cheese, ham, salami, smoked fish (salmon or sprats or pickled herring), tomato, pickled cucumber, lettuce, raw onion or other vegetable, etc.

The open sandwich is the common, traditional sandwich type in the Nordic countries, Estonia, Latvia, Lithuania, the Netherlands, Belarus, Russia, Poland, Ukraine, Kazakhstan where it is typically eaten at breakfast, lunch, supper, or as a snack. In Finland the sandwich is called voileipä, and in Estonia similarly võileib, which also means "butter bread".

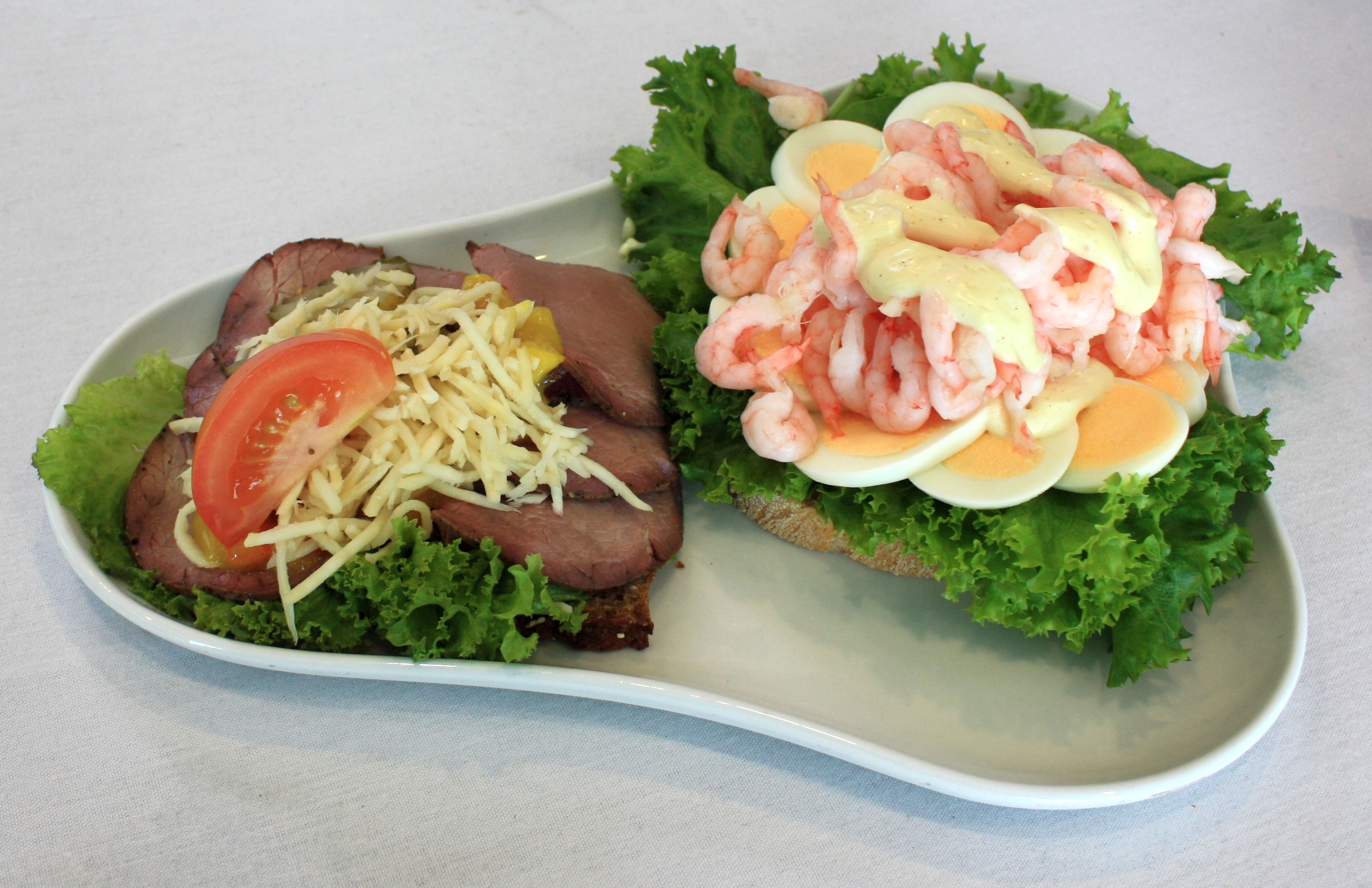
Danish Smørrebrød with eggs, shrimp and roast beef

The Scandinavian open sandwich (Danish: smørrebrød, Norwegian: smørbrød, Swedish: smörgås or macka) consists of one piece of buttered bread, often whole-grain rye bread (Danish: rugbrød, Swedish: rågbröd, Finnish: ruisleipä), topped with, for instance, cheese, cold steak, ham, turkey, shrimps, smoked salmon, caviar, hard boiled eggs, bacon, herring, fish fillets, liver pâté (Danish: leverpostej, Norwegian: leverpostei, Swedish: leverpastej), or small meatballs. This is typically complemented by some herbs and vegetables such as parsley, cold salad, thinly sliced cucumber, tomato wedges or pickled beets, etc. on the same slice of bread.

A condiment, such as mayonnaise, or mayonnaise-based dressing is also often included in some form. An old traditional replacement for butter on a piece of bread with herring is pig fat. There are many variations associated with the smørrebrød/smørbrød/smörgås and there are even special stores, cafés and restaurants (especially in Denmark) that specialize in them.

The Dutch and Flemish Uitsmijter consists of one or more slices of bread topped with fried eggs (one per slice of bread), and can be accompanied by slices of cheese or meat (roast beef or ham). The dish is often served as a hearty breakfast. Sweet toppings are commonly used for breakfast in the Netherlands and Belgium: e.g. sprinkles, vlokken, or muisjes, next to the more widespread peanut butter, honey, jam, and chocolate spread.

In Great Britain, open sandwiches are rare outside of Scandinavian delicatessens. The open sandwiches found in Great Britain are the Welsh rarebit and other "on toast" dishes (e.g., cheese on toast), and the Scotch woodcock, an open sandwich served historically at the colleges of the University of Cambridge and University of Oxford and in the refreshment rooms of the House of Commons of the United Kingdom as late as 1949.

In North America, an open faced sandwich may also refer to a slice of bread topped with warm slices of roasted meat and gravy. Examples include a beef Manhattan, a hot chicken sandwich in Canada, or Welsh rarebit. This is also done in Scandinavian countries, where they also eat open faced sandwiches with fried meat and fried fish.

== Examples and varieties ==
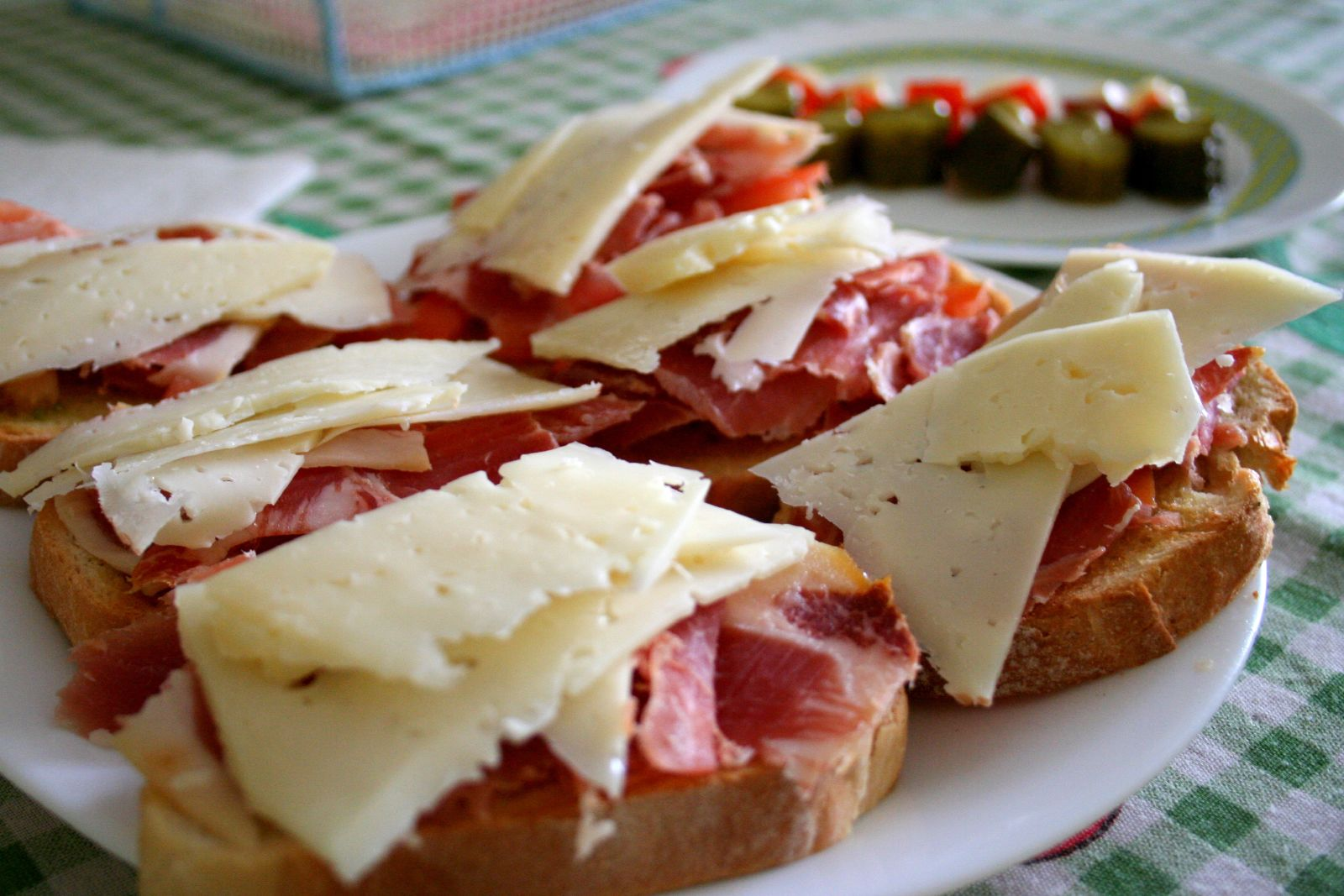
Open-faced ham and cheese tapas-style sandwiches

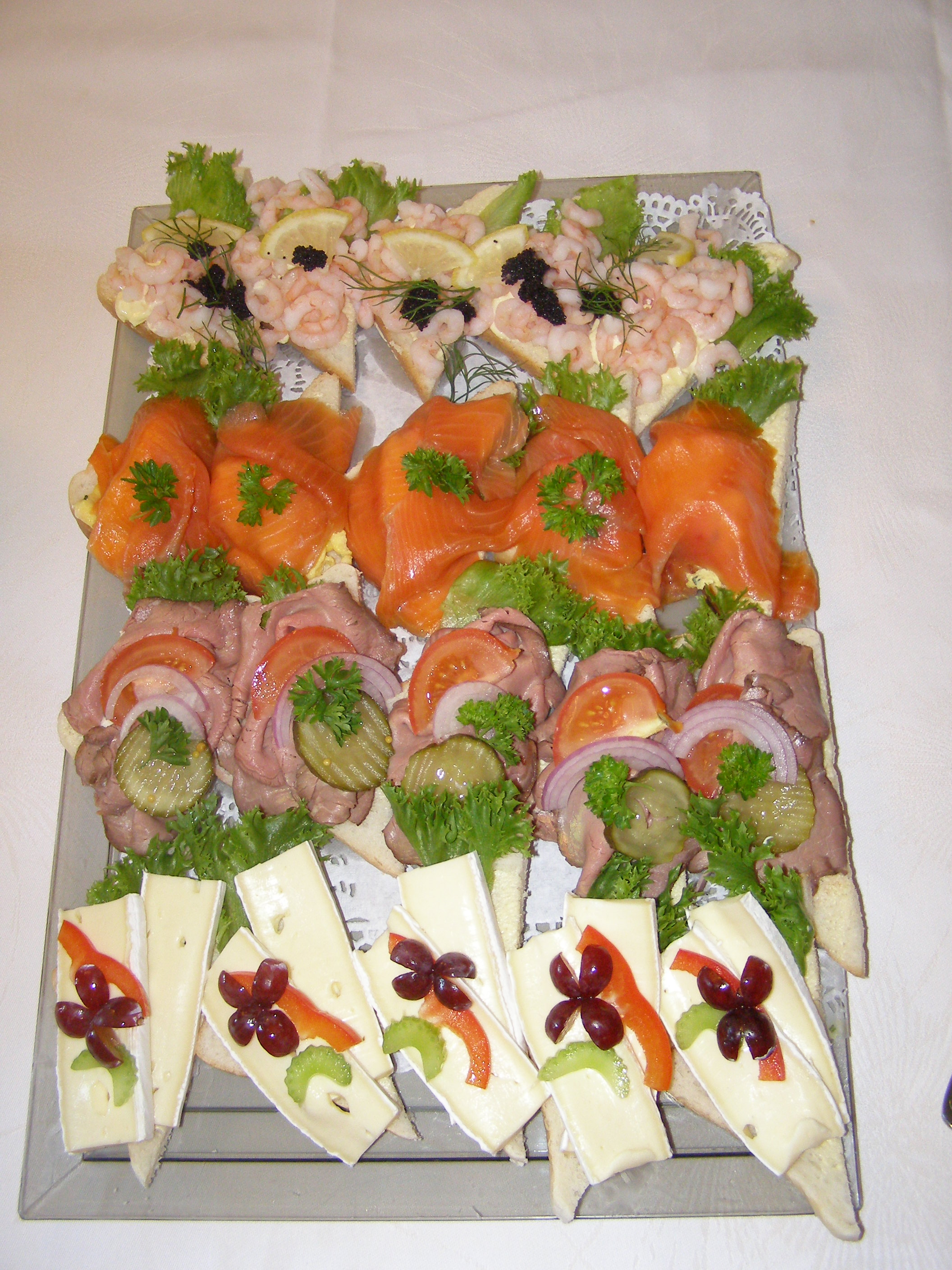
Smørbrød, Norwegian open sandwich

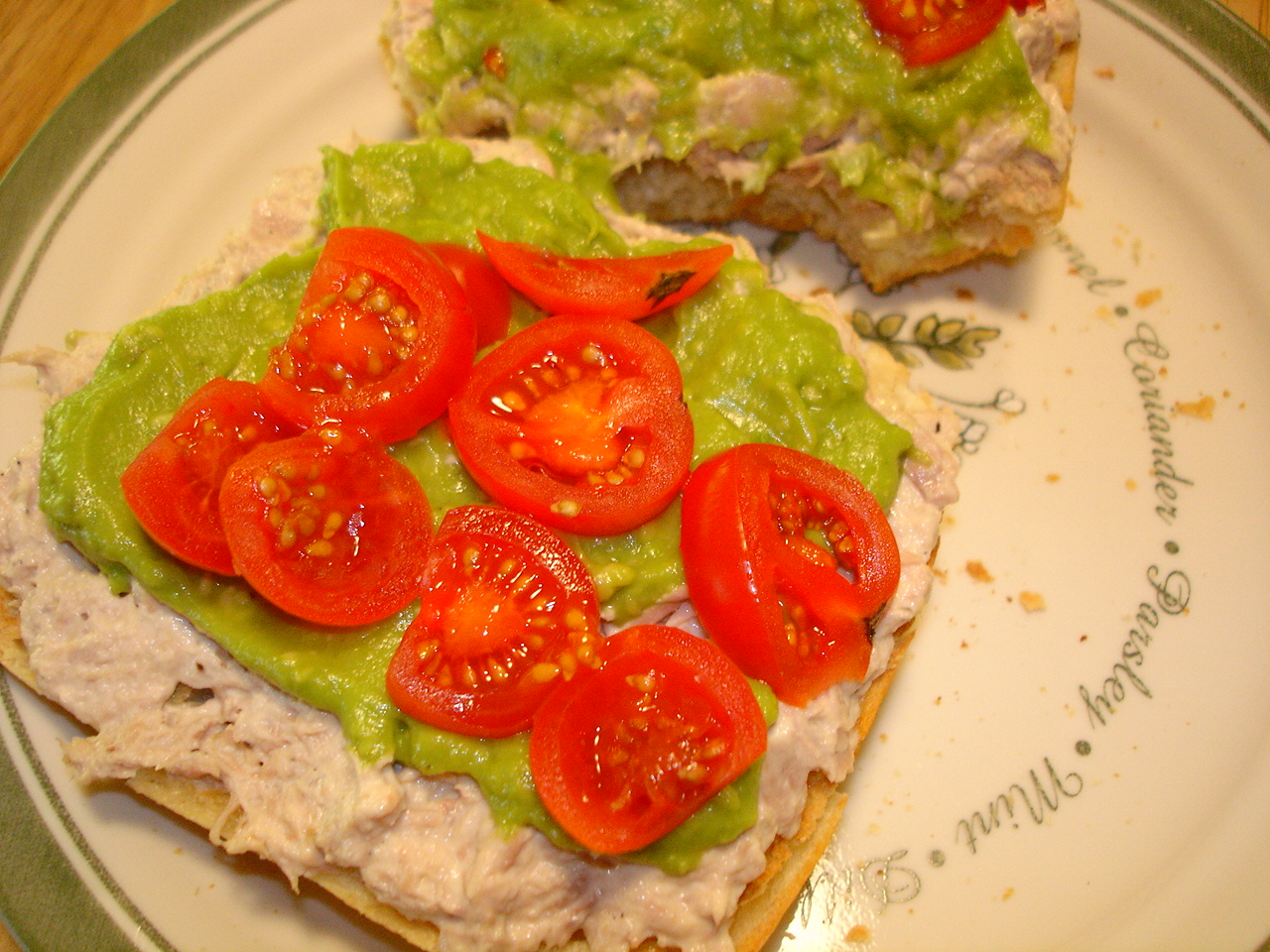
Open-faced tuna sandwich with guacamole and cherry tomatoes

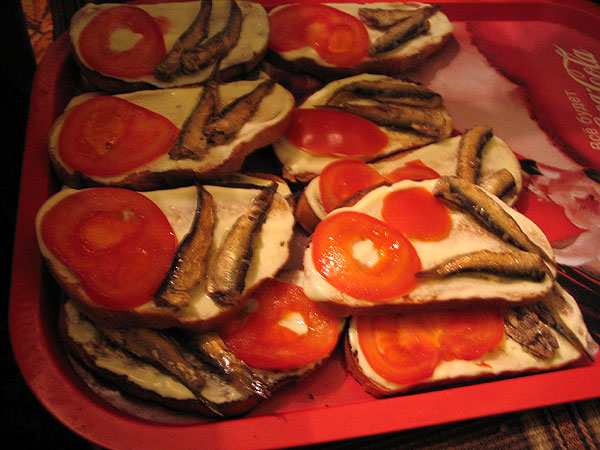
Russian buterbrod with tomatoes and Latvian sprat

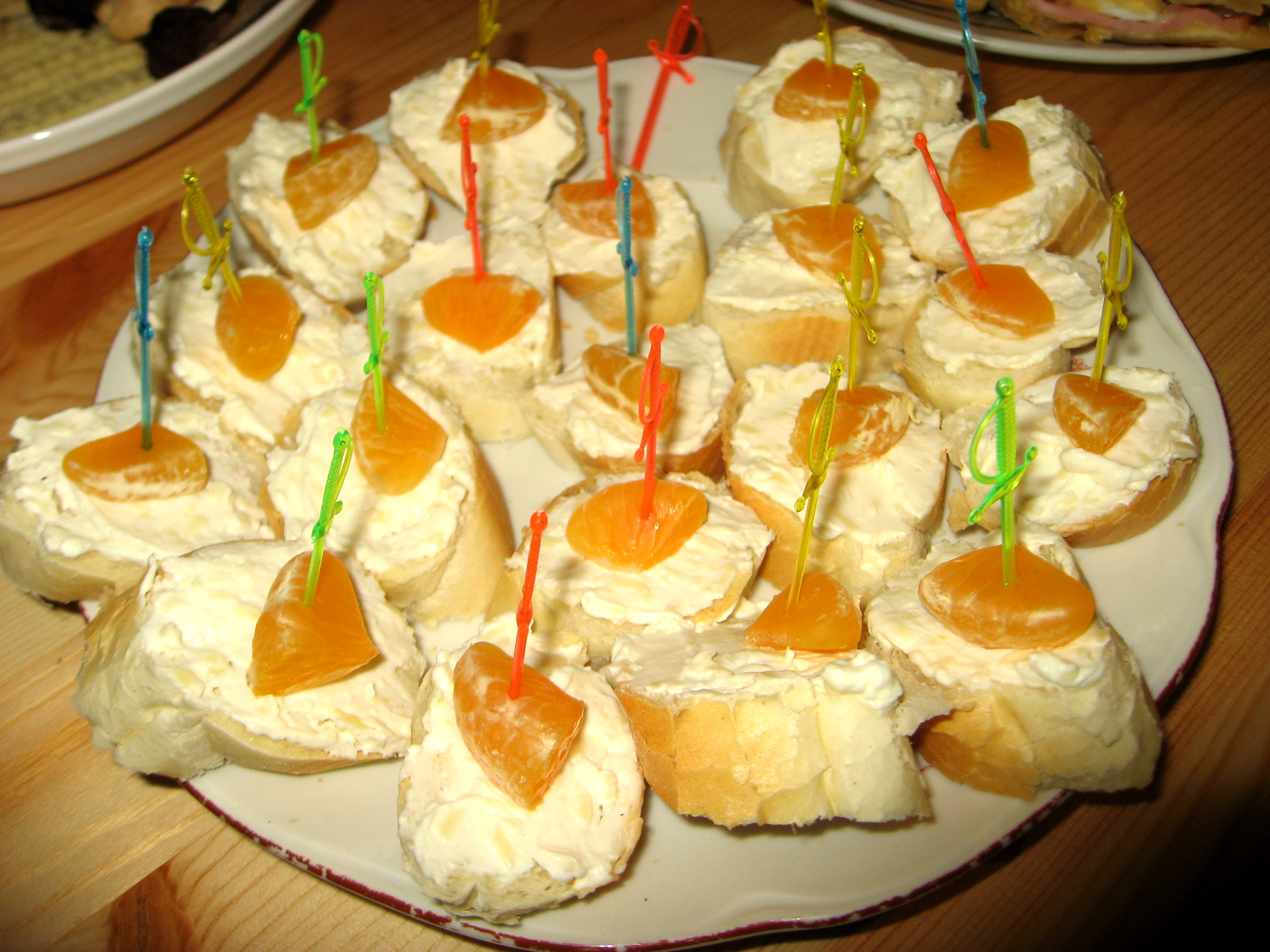
Czech jednohubky

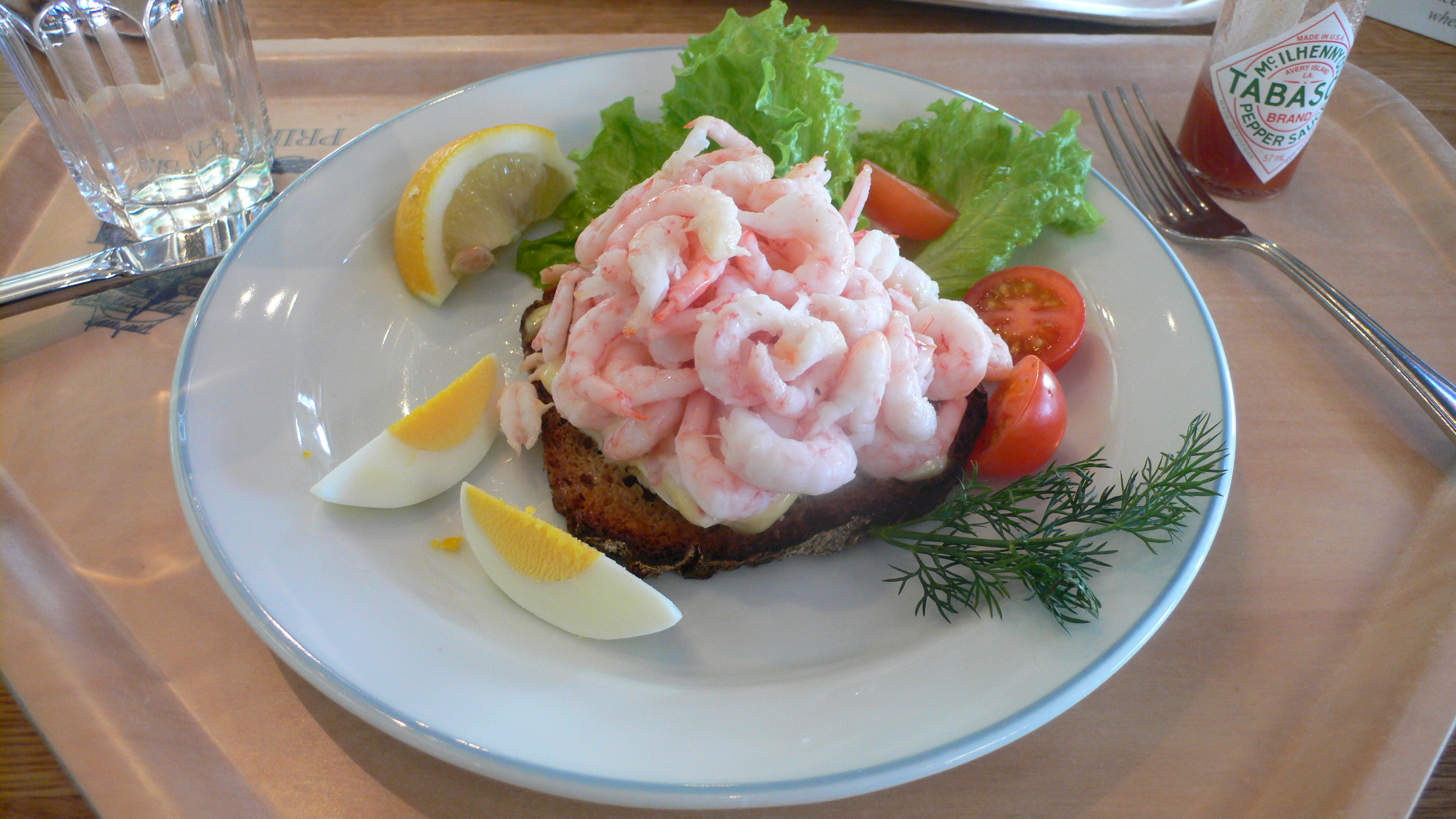
Scandinavian räksmörgås (open faced shrimp sandwich) in Stockholm

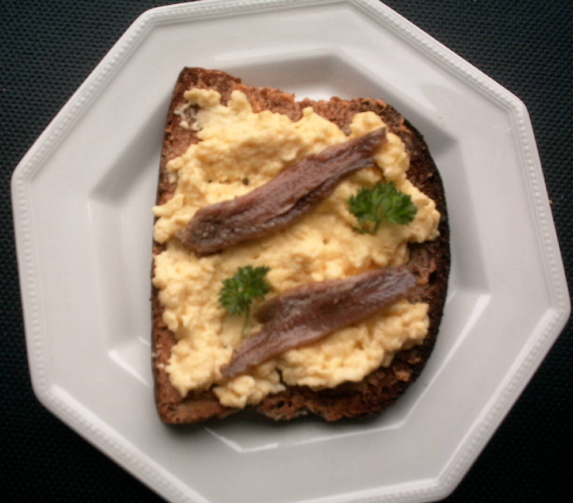
Scotch woodcock, scrambled eggs on toast garnished with anchovy fillets and parsley

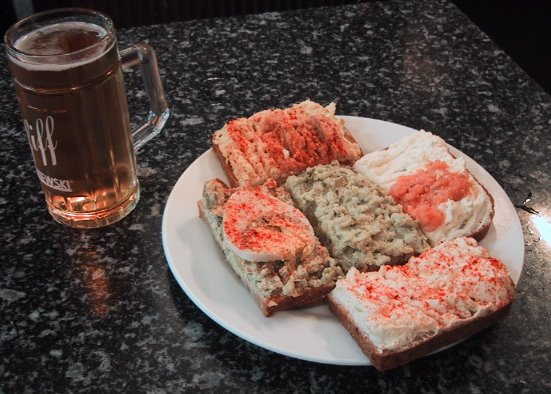
Open sandwiches in Vienna, with a Pfiff-size beer

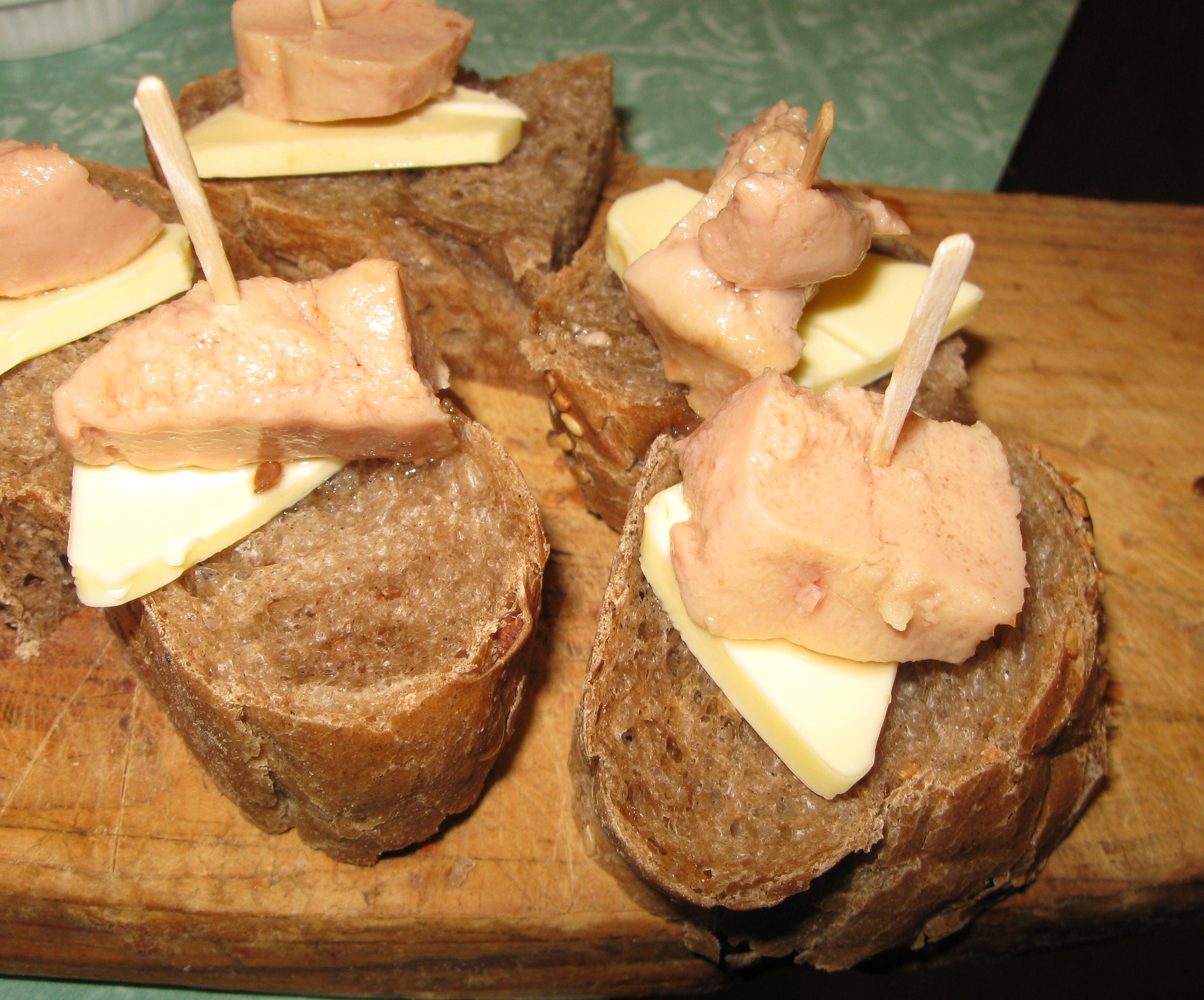
Small open sandwiches. Bread, butter and codfish liver paste.

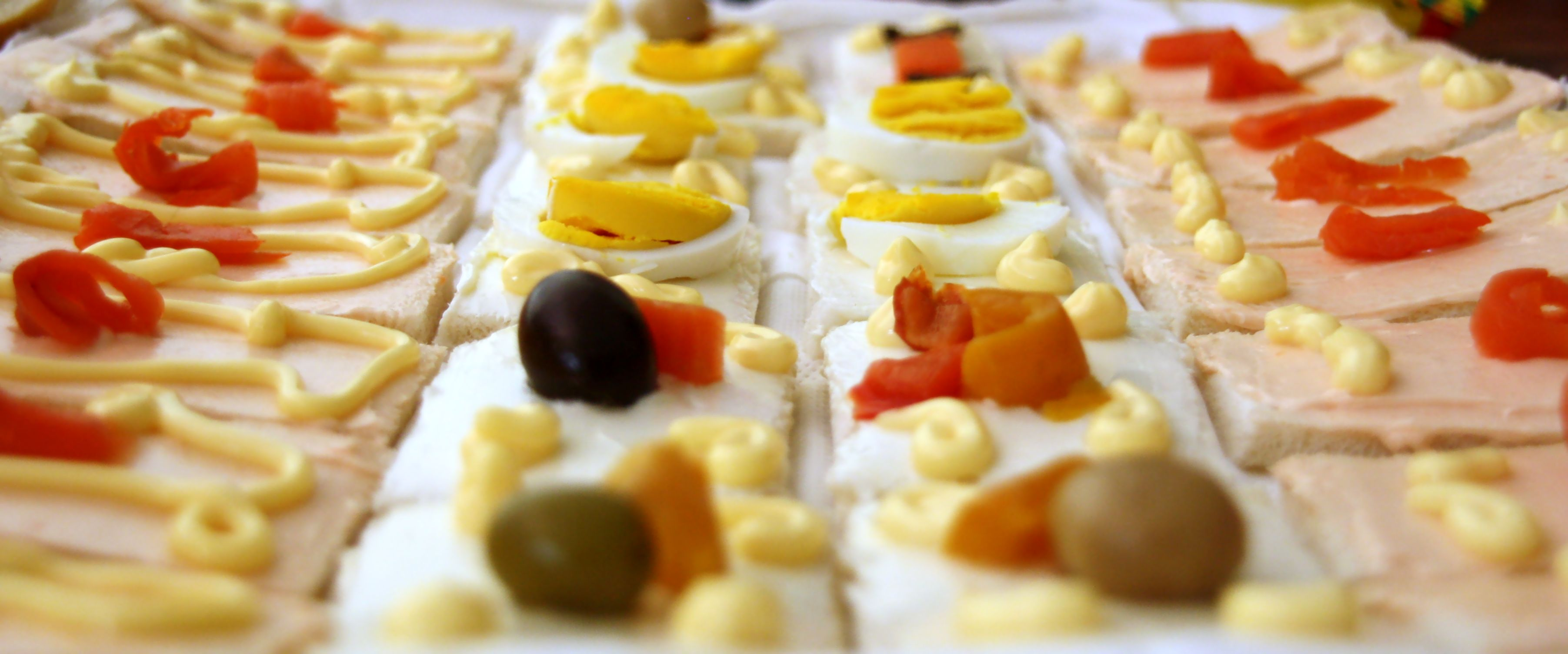
Parata di gola

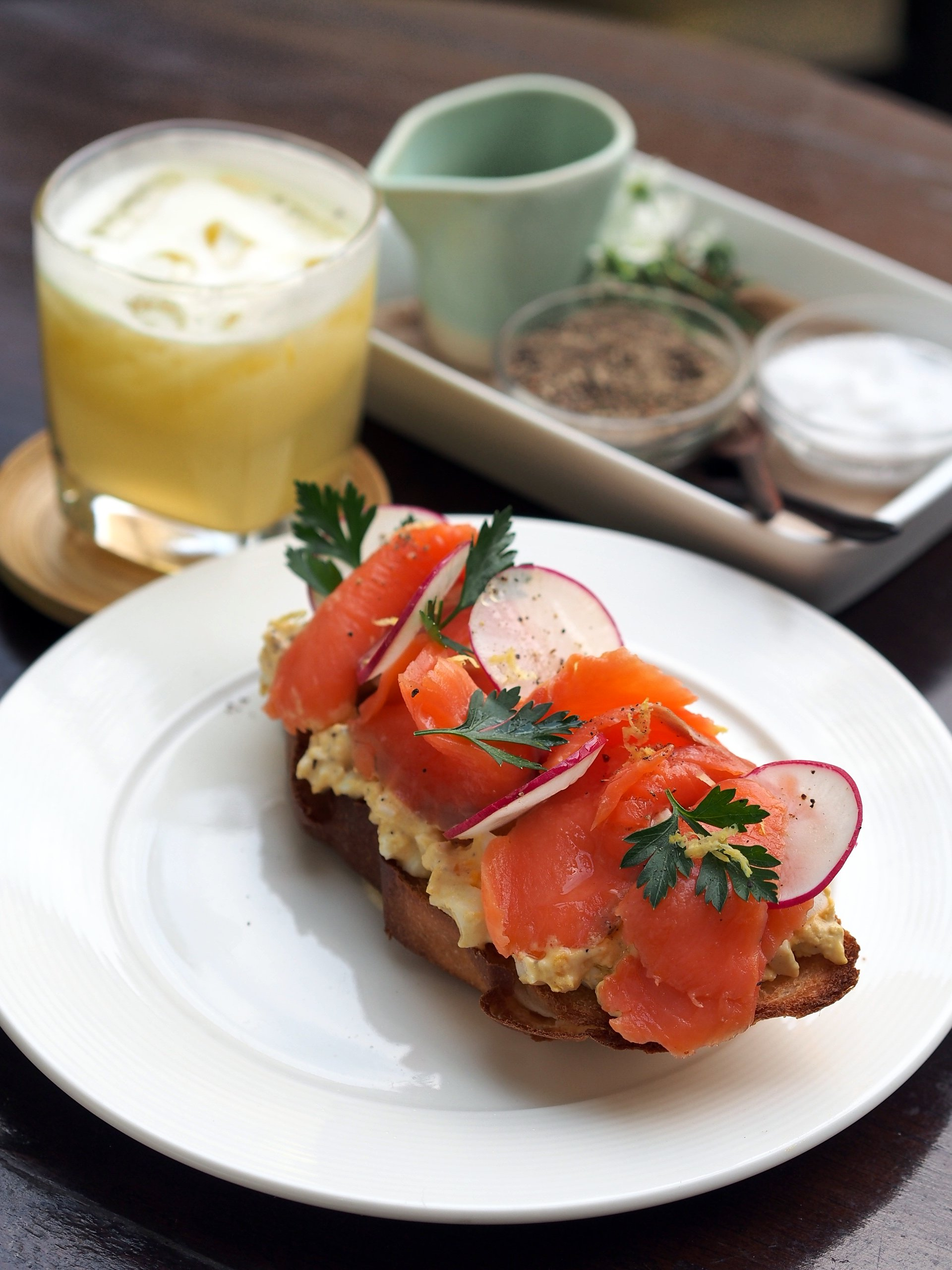
Egg salad and smoked salmon on a slice of toasted baguette

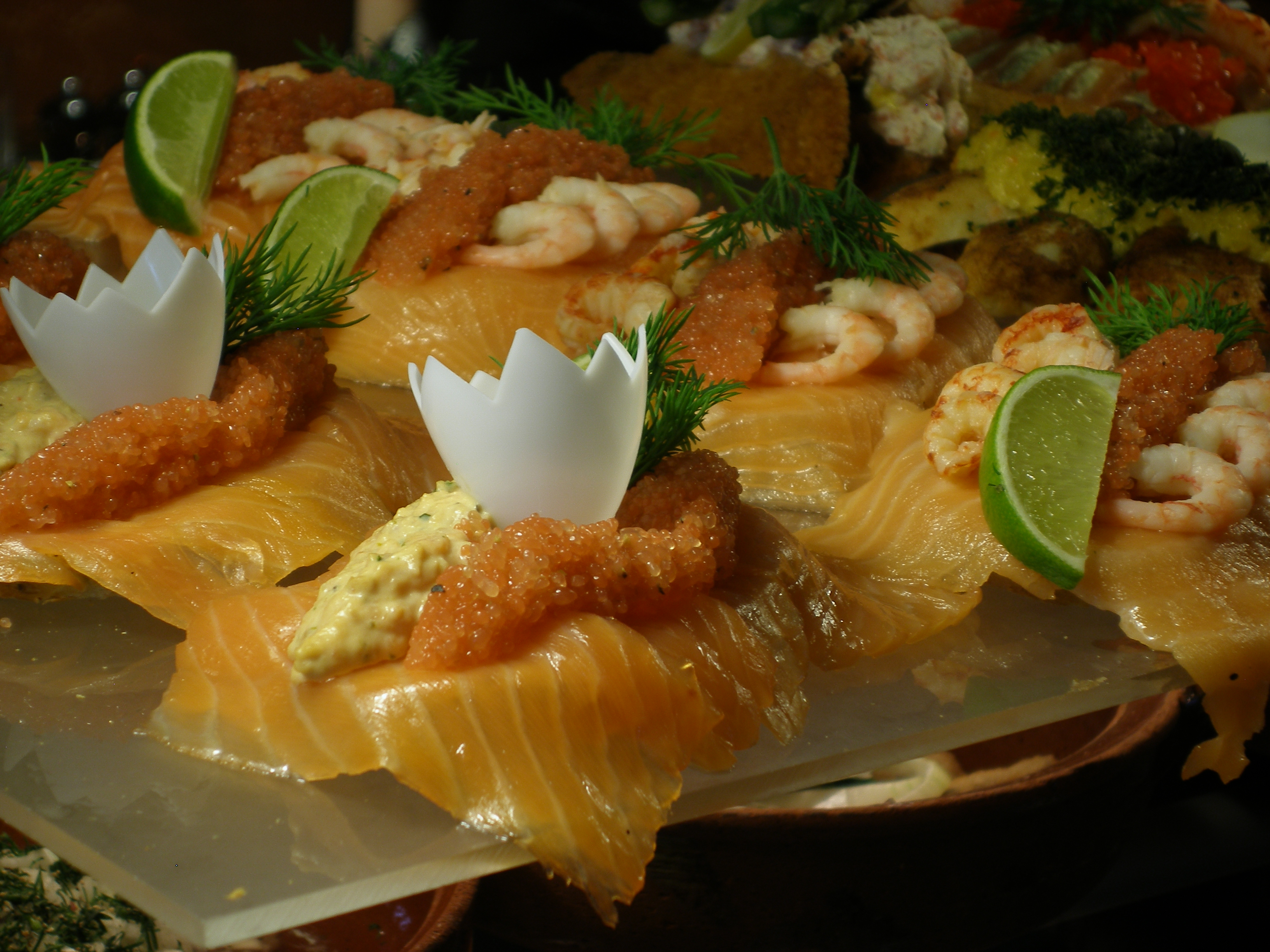
Smørrebrød with salmon and caviar

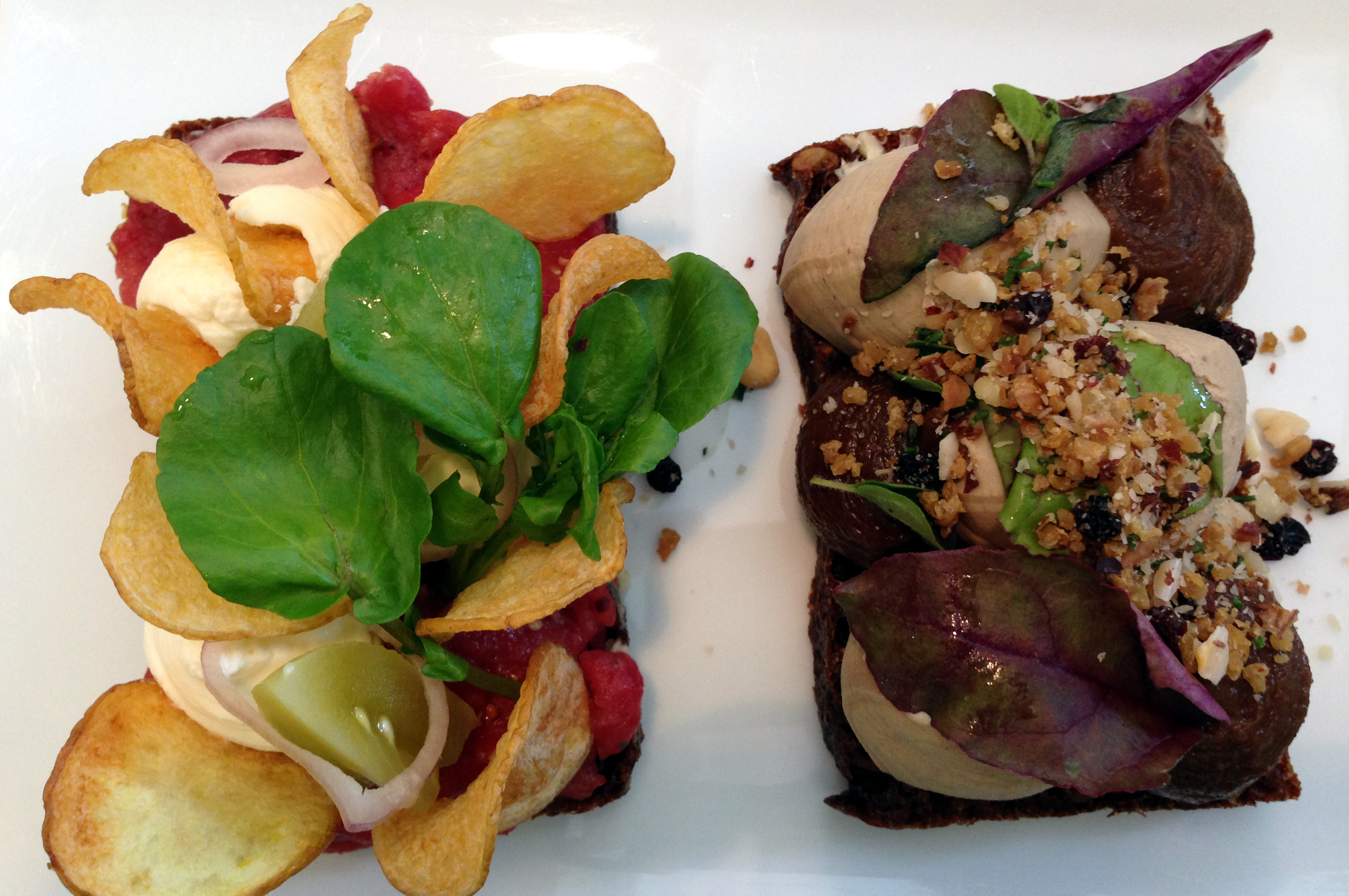
Smørrebrød with green and red salad, chicken liver and tartar sauce

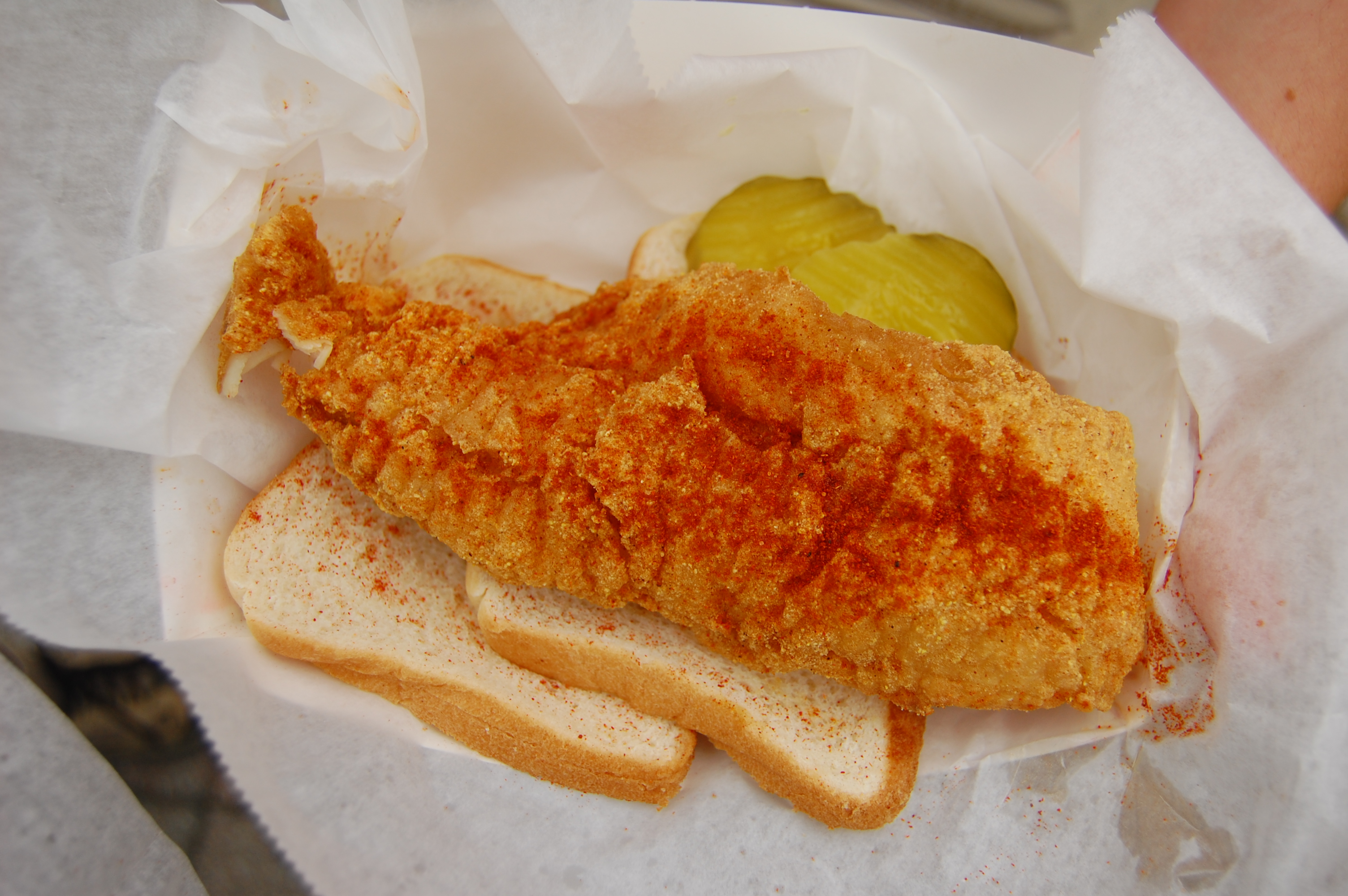
A hot fish sandwich from Bolton's Spicy Chicken & Fish at the Franklin Food & Spirits Festival in Franklin, Tennessee

== See also ==
- Butterbrot
- Canapé
- Croque-monsieur
- French toast
- Francesinha
- Grilled cheese sandwich
- Hors d'oeuvre
- Hot Brown
- Ham and cheese sandwich
- List of sandwiches
- Monte Cristo sandwich
- Obložené chlebíčky
- Sandwich
- Strammer Max
- Smörgåsbord
- Smörgåstårta
- Smørrebrød
- Tongue toast
- Welsh rarebit
