= Monte Cristo sandwich =

American fried ham and cheese sandwich

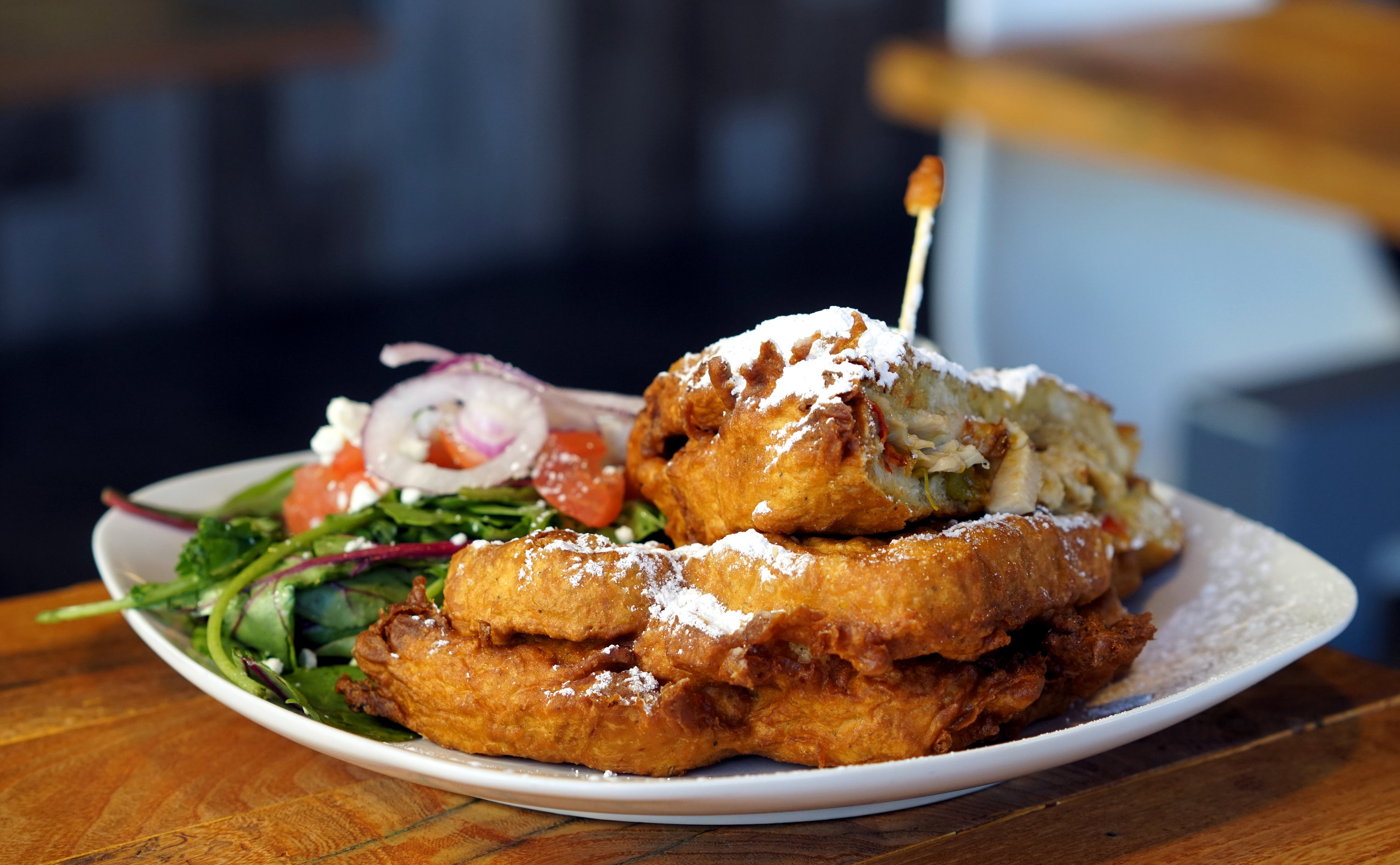
- Type: Sandwich
- Place of origin: United States
- Main ingredients: Bread, ham, cheese (Emmental or Gruyère), egg or batter

A Monte Cristo sandwich is a ham and cheese sandwich dipped in egg and pan-fried. It is a variation of the French croque monsieur.

== History ==
The first documented reference to a "Monte Cristo Sandwich" was in an American restaurant industry publication in 1923, despite the common claim that it was developed in the 1960s in Southern California. From the 1930s to the 1960s, American cookbooks commonly had recipes for similar croque monsieur variants, under such names as "French sandwich", "toasted ham sandwich", and "French toasted cheese sandwich". It was especially popular in southern California, and became more broadly popular after the Blue Bayou Restaurant in Disneyland began serving it.

== Description ==
The sandwich can either be savory or a mixture of savory and sweet. In its most basic form, it is dipped in beaten egg and pan-fried, though it may also be deep-fried in beer or pancake batter. Regional variations may include sliced turkey or caramelized onions. Some variants are served grilled; in others, it is served as an open sandwich, with only the bread egg-dipped and pan fried. In such cases, the fully assembled sandwich is then usually heated slightly under a grill or broiler. In sweeter versions, it is often covered in powdered sugar and served with maple syrup or preserves.

== See also ==
- Cheese dream
- French toast
- Grilled cheese
- List of sandwiches
- Welsh rarebit
