= Savoury toast =

Australian food

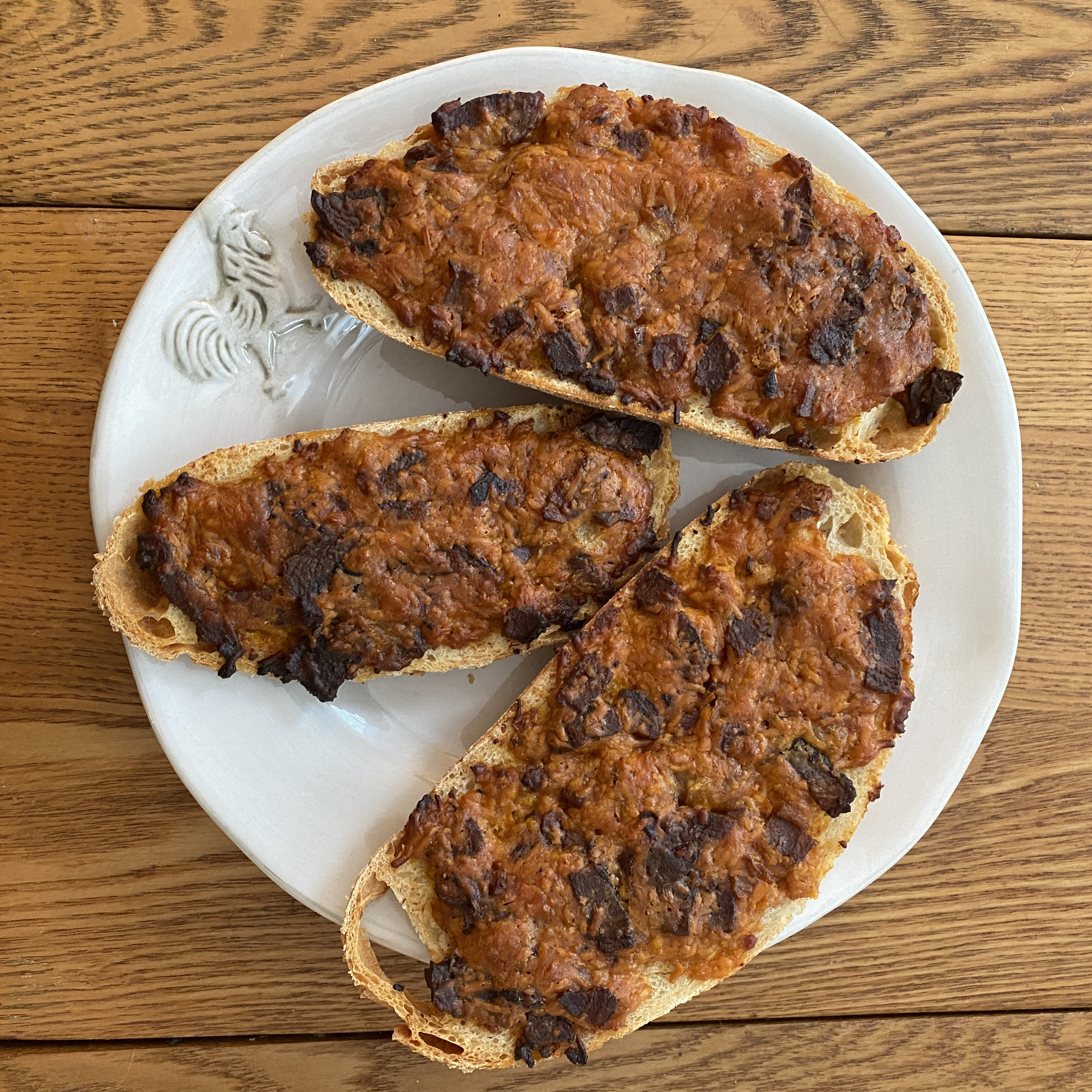
- Course: Snack
- Place of origin: Australia
- Main ingredients: Bread, bacon, egg, cheese

Savoury toast is a Tasmanian snack food made by covering a slice of bread with a prepared topping, commonly consisting of beaten egg, bacon pieces, diced onion, cheese, tomato sauce and Worcestershire sauce, and then baking.

Recipes date from at least the 1860s.

== Preparation and ingredients ==
The dish commonly consists of bread topped with a combination of beaten egg, bacon pieces, diced onion, cheese, tomato sauce and Worcestershire sauce. The mix of ingredients is spread onto the bread slices before it is baked in a moderate oven. Savoury toast is often sold in local bakeries and is also commonly made at home. Despite its popularity in Tasmania, it is not a well-known food item on the Australian mainland.

== History ==
Recipes for savoury toast vary and can be found in early copies of Australian newspapers and women's magazines. The earliest dated recipe can be found from 1865 in the Australasian Post weekly periodical in the Ladies' Column and describes a similar recipe utilising fewer ingredients. The first known mention of savoury toast from a Tasmanian publication was in the Launceston Examiner on the 14 March 1885. Despite early recipes for savoury toast being found nationwide, it was only in Tasmania where the recipe remained popular and evolved to today's version of the recipe.

== Similar dishes ==
- Cheese roll
- Hot Brown
- Welsh rarebit
