= Grilled cheese =

Hot melted cheese sandwich

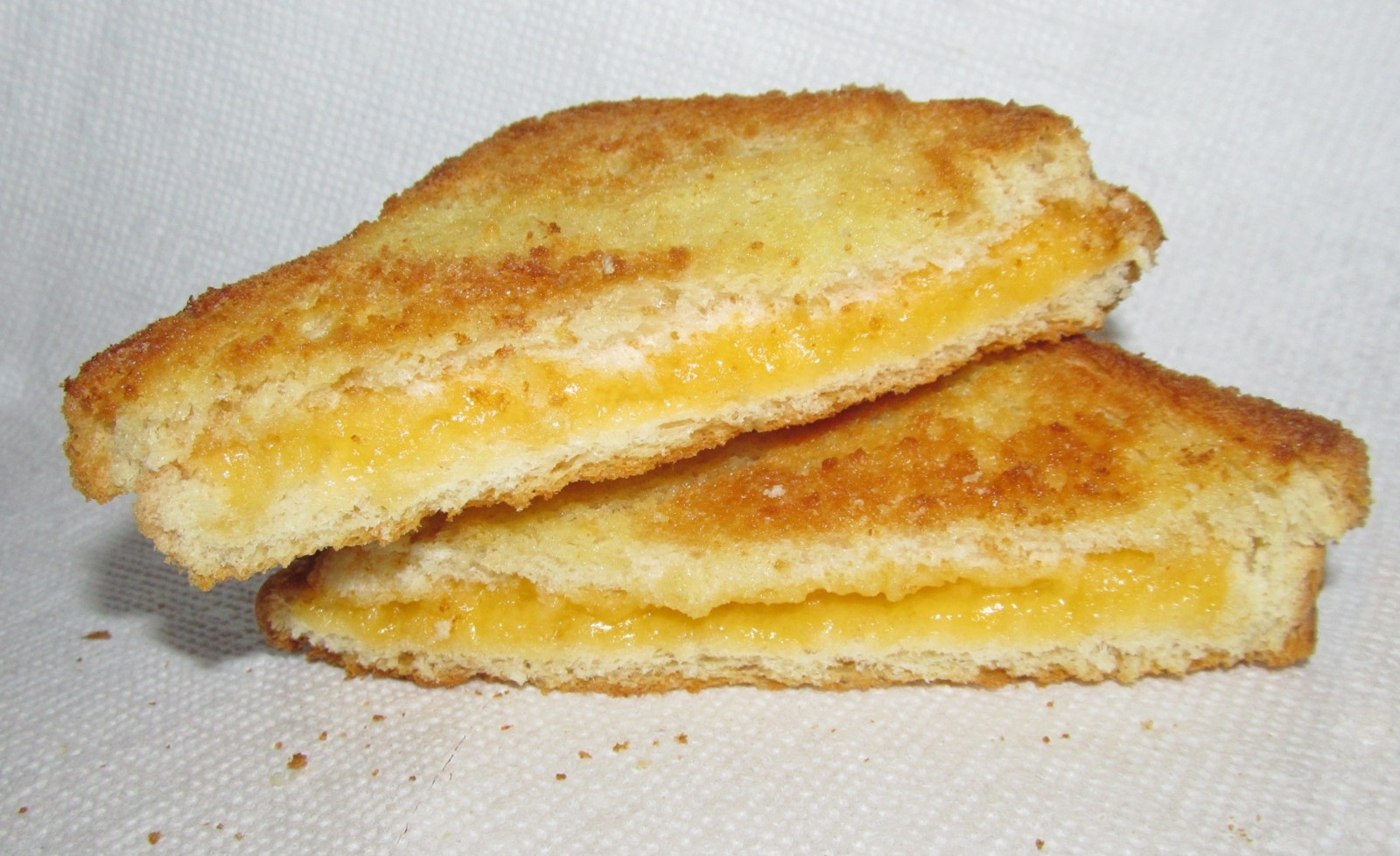
- Cross section of a grilled cheese
- Alternative names: Toasted cheese sandwich, cheese toastie, cheese jaffle
- Place of origin: United Kingdom
- Main ingredients: Cheese, bread
- Ingredients generally used: Butter, margarine, mayonnaise
- Variations: Cheese dream
- Other information: Traditionally served with tomato soup

A grilled cheese, toasted cheese sandwich, cheese toastie (UK), cheese jaffle (NZ/AU) or toastie (AU) is a hot cheese sandwich typically prepared by placing cheese between slices of bread and cooking with butter or mayonnaise on a frying pan, griddle, or pie iron, until the bread browns and the cheese melts. Despite its name, it is rarely prepared through grilling.

== History ==
The 1861 English recipe book Mrs. Beeton's Book of Household Management includes a recipe for placing sandwiches of brown bread and butter with 1/2-inch (13 mm) slices of "a nice fat Cheshire or any good rich cheese" into an oven, and serving when the bread becomes toasted.

The cheese dream, an open-faced grilled cheese sandwich (a close variation of cheese on toast), became popular in the United States during the Great Depression. Cookbooks produced by the U.S. federal government describe U.S. Navy cooks grilling "American cheese filling sandwiches" during World War II.

== Preparation ==
Instructional video for making a grilled cheese sandwich

A grilled cheese sandwich is made by placing a cheese filling, often cheddar or American cheese, between two slices of bread, which is then put on a pan to heat until the bread browns and the cheese melts. A layer of butter or mayonnaise is usually added to the outside of the bread for additional flavor and texture. Alternatives may include additional ingredients such as peppers, tomatoes, or onions. Although cheddar and American cheese are used most widely, other variations of cheese like provolone or gouda are also used depending on the region and the local influences. A grilled cheese may also be made in a pie iron, particularly in the United Kingdom where the dish is normally called a toasted cheese sandwich or cheese toastie.

== Retail ==
Some restaurants, food carts, and food trucks in the United States specialize in the grilled cheese sandwich. The Grilled Cheese Grill restaurants were a combination of reclaimed vehicle and food cart restaurants that focused on gourmet grilled cheese sandwiches in Portland, Oregon, US. The Grilled Cheese Truck was an American food truck company serving gourmet "chef driven" grilled cheese sandwiches. Variations include a rainbow grilled cheese, using colored cheese.

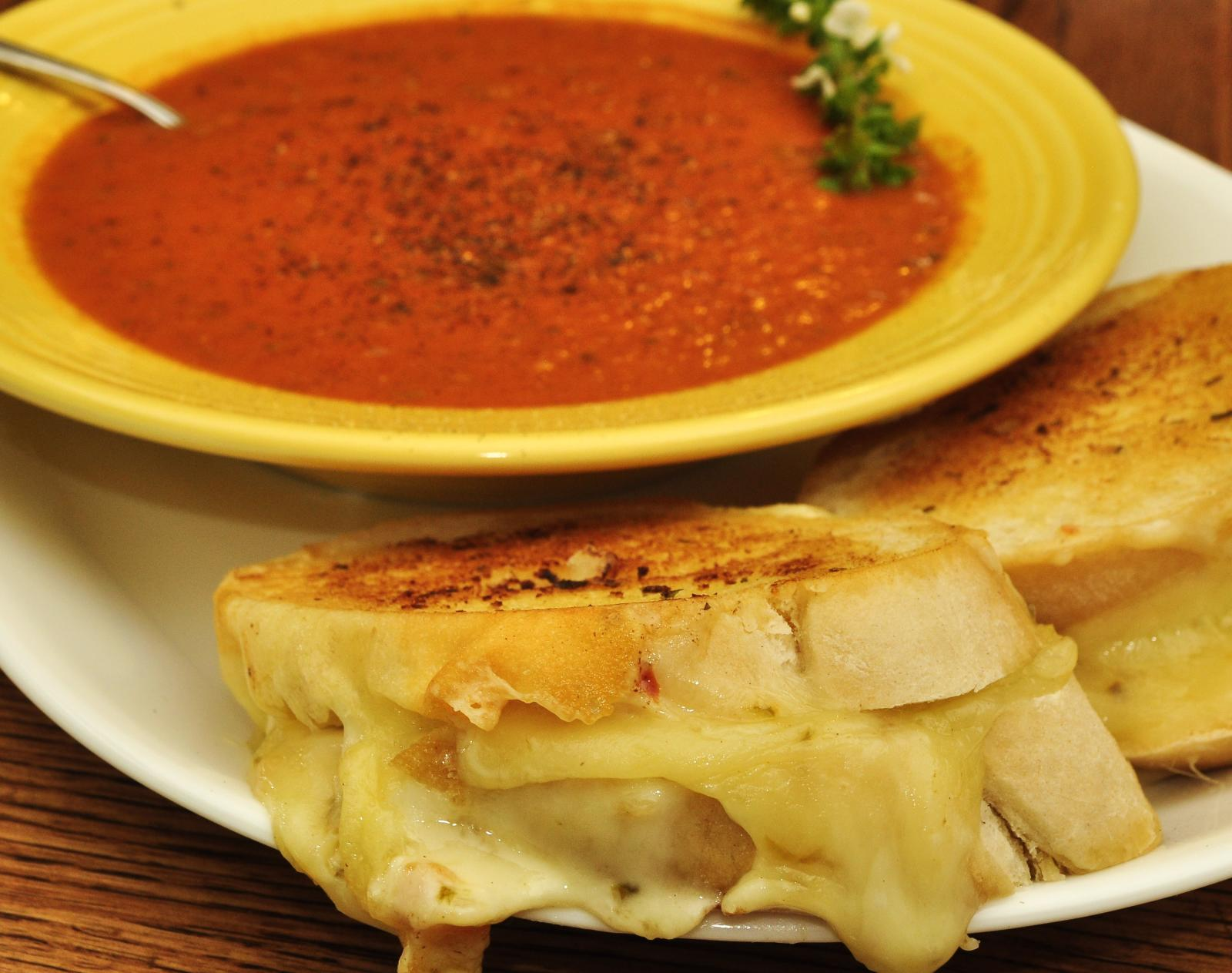
A grilled cheese served with tomato soup

Microwavable frozen toasted sandwiches are available in supermarkets in a variety of locations. One example is the McCain Micro Toastie, which was launched in supermarkets in the UK in 2002.

== See also ==
- Cheese sandwich
- Bruschetta
- Carrozza (sandwich)
- Cheese dream
- Cheese on toast
- Comfort food
- Croque monsieur
- Fried cheese
- Gözleme
- Khachapuri
- List of sandwiches
- Melt sandwich
- Monte Cristo sandwich
- Panini
- Patty melt
- Pie iron
- Quesadilla
- Reuben sandwich
- Welsh rarebit
