= Chreese =

Vegan cheese substitute

Cheddar Chreese sauce mix

Chreese is a vegan cheese substitute made with nutritional yeast. The product is manufactured by Road's End Organics, a U.S. company that specializes in food for people with special dietary needs. Chreese is organic, lactose-free, cholesterol and saturated fat-free. It comes in a number of varieties, including a powder mix, a queso dip alternative, and as part of a "Mac & Chreese" line of pasta products.

There are currently four different styles of Chreese powder mixes with a modified version for children: "Cheddar Style" and gluten-free cheddar style (used in grilled cheese sandwiches), "Mozzarella Style" (used on pizza), "Gluten Free Alfredo Style", and "KIDz Chreese" (less garlic and bright orange color). To make chreese, the powder mix is combined with boiling water and blended in a food processor which can then be stored in the refrigerator for up to two weeks.

The queso dip (nacho cheese) alternative is called "Nacho Chreese". It comes in mild and spicy flavors and may be used as a dip with tortilla chips. There are also five different "Mac & Chreese" pasta products, made with either semolina, whole wheat, or brown rice noodles.

Similar soy cheeses are also available from European manufacturers.
