= Pinkie Pride =

- My Little Pony: Friendship Is Magic episode
- Cheese Sandwich (left) and Pinkie Pie before competing in a "goof-off"
- Episode no.: Season 4 Episode 12
- Directed by: Jayson Thiessen
- Story by: Jayson Thiessen
- Teleplay by: Amy Keating Rogers
- Editing by: Margaret Reid; Meghan McCarthy (story)
- Original air date: February 1, 2014
- Running time: 22 minutes

Guest appearance
- "Weird Al" Yankovic as Cheese Sandwich

Episode chronology
← Previous "Three's a Crowd"	Next → "Simple Ways"
- My Little Pony: Friendship Is Magic (season 4)

"Pinkie Pride" is the twelfth episode of the fourth season of the animated television series My Little Pony: Friendship Is Magic, and the seventy-seventh episode of the series overall. It aired on February 1, 2014. It was directed by Jayson Thiessen, co-directed by Jim Miller, and its screenplay was written by Amy Keating Rogers from a story by Thiessen. It was produced by Sarah Wall and Devon Cody.

The episode centers on Pinkie Pie (voiced by Andrea Libman), whose plans to organize a birthday party for Rainbow Dash (voiced by Ashleigh Ball) are interrupted by a similarly energetic pony, Cheese Sandwich ("Weird Al" Yankovic), leading Pinkie Pie to defend her pride as a party planner in a "goof-off".

Yankovic's involvement in the episode was the result of interactions on Twitter between him and Jayson Thiessen. Aired on February 1, 2014, on the Hub Network, "Pinkie Pride" was viewed by 459,000 people and garnered acclaim from critics, who praised Pinkie Pie and Cheese Sandwich's characterizations.

== Plot ==
External videos
- Pinkie Pride (full episode) — Official upload of the episode onto YouTube

As he oversees an extravagant party he has thrown in Appleloosa, party planner Cheese Sandwich senses a "doozy" of a party being thrown in Ponyville, where Pinkie Pie is organizing her friend Rainbow Dash a party, celebrating both the latter's birthday and anniversary of her move to Ponyville. Pinkie promises to throw Rainbow Dash the best "birthiversary" party ever when Cheese appears and introduces himself as the premier party planner in Equestria. Though initially delighted to meet a party planner like herself, Pinkie is upset as Cheese enraptures the townsfolk with his party-throwing skills, causing her friends to desert her for Cheese's party.

Cheese begins building a massive set for Rainbow Dash's party, while almost all help him build it. Doubting her own partying skills, Pinkie attempts several odd-end jobs around Ponyville that fail. She returns home dejected and begins to put her party supplies away before looking through framed pictures showing various parties she has thrown in the past. With renewed confidence, Pinkie challenges Cheese to a goofing showdown ("goof-off"), declaring the winner will be dubbed the single best party planner and headline Rainbow Dash's party. Cheese accepts and Rainbow Dash becomes the judge of the competition. The two try to outdo each other with increasingly silly and elaborate performances until Pinkie accidentally drops a giant piñata on top of Rainbow Dash. Pinkie realizes her pride has gotten in the way of Rainbow Dash's party and forfeits the goof-off to Cheese.

Pinkie packs up her belongings and prepares to leave Ponyville, deciding to let Cheese take her place. She is stopped by Rainbow Dash and her other friends, who apologize for neglecting her, but Pinkie counters that it is her fault instead, apologizing for her destructive pride. However, her friends affirm that, while both are talented party planners, Cheese could never replace her as their friend. Cheese arrives and apologizes as well, assuring that he never meant any harm, but rather wanted to impress her with his partying; he confesses that, contrary to his previous claims of being a partier all his life, he was extremely shy as a colt until he stumbled upon a party thrown by Pinkie, which inspired him to become a party planner. Pinkie and Cheese make amends and work together to throw Rainbow Dash a party before Cheese departs, leaving Pinkie his valued rubber chicken "Boneless" as a gift.

== Production ==
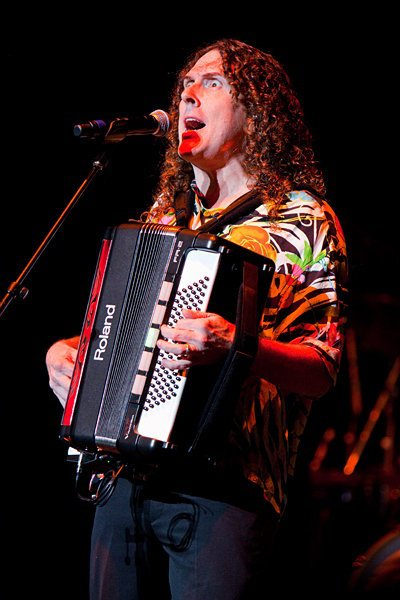
"Weird Al" Yankovic, as seen in 2010, guest stars as the voice of Cheese Sandwich

The episode was first teased by Hasbro Vice President of Development Mike Vogel during a panel at San Diego Comic-Con in July 2013, where he hinted about a musical season 4 episode where "somebody will give [Pinkie Pie] a run for her partying money." The involvement of "Weird Al" Yankovic in the episode stemmed from a Twitter post by the parody musician, where he had linked to a user-created music video with scenes from Friendship Is Magic episodes set to "Polkarama!", one of his polka medleys. The tweet was discovered by co-executive producer Jayson Thiessen, who posted a reply asking the musician if he would be interested in the idea of guest voicing a character on the show since "Weird Al and My Little Pony seem to go together really well." After being met with a positive response from fans of the series, Thiessen received a private message from Yankovic about a year later, expressing his interest in participating. In the episode, Yankovic voiced a character named Cheese Sandwich, who is portrayed as being a rival to Pinkie Pie in the realm of party service. In a Reddit "Ask me Anything" on the release of his subsequent album, Mandatory Fun, Yankovic stated that he "had a blast" performing as Cheese Sandwich and was "extremely happy" with the episode, and would be glad to reprise the role if the showrunners asked. Yankovic would later reprise the character in 2019 for the season 9 episode "The Last Laugh".

The episode was written by Amy Keating Rogers based on a story idea by Jayson Thiessen. In an interview with USA Today, Thiessen went on to say that they had gone "all out" with the episode's animation, that it contained "a couple special things that we've never done before", and that the episode had "a lot of great songs" as well. A short live-action cutaway with a dancing, live-action balloon animal version of Cheese Sandwich's rubber chicken Boneless (made using balloons and rice) was filmed in Thiessen's basement.

=== Featured songs ===
The episode is a musical featuring six songs with music provided by Daniel Ingram. Lyrics for the songs were originally penned by Amy Keating Rogers and reworked by Ingram. Rogers wrote the lyrics for the various songs with other melodies in mind: "Pinkie the Party Planner" was based on "Belle" from Beauty and the Beast; "The Super Duper Party Pony" on "Supercalifragilisticexpialidocious" from Mary Poppins; "Pinkie's Lament" on "Don't Cry for Me Argentina" from Evita, "The Goof Off" on "Together (Wherever We Go)" as performed on The Brady Bunch, and "Make a Wish" on Pink's "Raise Your Glass". While Shannon Chan-Kent sang as Pinkie for most of the songs, the character's regular voice actress, Andrea Libman, performed the character during "The Goof Off". Ingram recorded the character Cheese Sandwich's songs with Yankovic in Los Angeles. A full version of the song "Make a Wish" is included on the album Songs of Ponyville.

1. "Pinkie the Party Planner"
2. "The Super Duper Party Pony"
3. "Pinkie's Lament"
4. "The Goof Off"
5. "Cheese Confesses"
6. "Make a Wish"

Steffan Andrews and David Corman helped with the orchestration and arrangements of every song except "Make a Wish".

== Broadcast and reception ==
"Pinkie Pride" aired on February 1, 2014, on the Hub Network. According to the Nielsen household ratings, the episode was viewed by 459,000 people and watched by approximately 0.3 percent of households in the United States.

The episode received positive reviews from critics. Daniel Alvarez of Unleash the Fanboy gave the episode a rating of 4.5 out of 5 stars, calling it a "really good episode and a very nice look at Pinkie Pie as a character", and praising the characterization of Cheese Sandwich and his rivalry with Pinkie, while noting the "mean" portrayal of Pinkie's friends as a minor setback. Raymond Gallant from Freakin' Awesome Network awarded the episode a rating of 10 out of 10, considering it "one of the season's best". Noting Pinkie's "moronic" portrayal in other episodes, Gallant praised her "good heart", which he thought gave her more characterization. He also praised the episode's humor, Yankovic's role as "a male version of Pinkie Pie", and the episode's use of musical sequences compared to the earlier musical episode "Magical Mystery Cure", writing, "the story had a chance to breathe, and be built up far better with all the songs added." Ingram and Andrews were nominated for a 2014 Leo Award for "Best Musical Score in an Animation Program or Series". Rae Grimes of Comic Book Resources ranked "Pinkie's Lament" as the eighth best song in Friendship Is Magic. She wrote that the sorrowful tone of the song was starkly different from the rest of her songs, which tend to be upbeat and happy.

== Home media ==
The episode was part of the Season 4 DVD set from Shout! Factory that was released on December 2, 2014, as well as the "Adventures of the Cutie Mark Crusaders" DVD, which was released on February 24, 2015. "The Super Duper Party Pony" is also part of Yankovic's Medium Rarities album which is part of Squeeze Box: The Complete Works of "Weird Al" Yankovic.
