= Welsh rarebit =

British dish of cheese sauce on toast

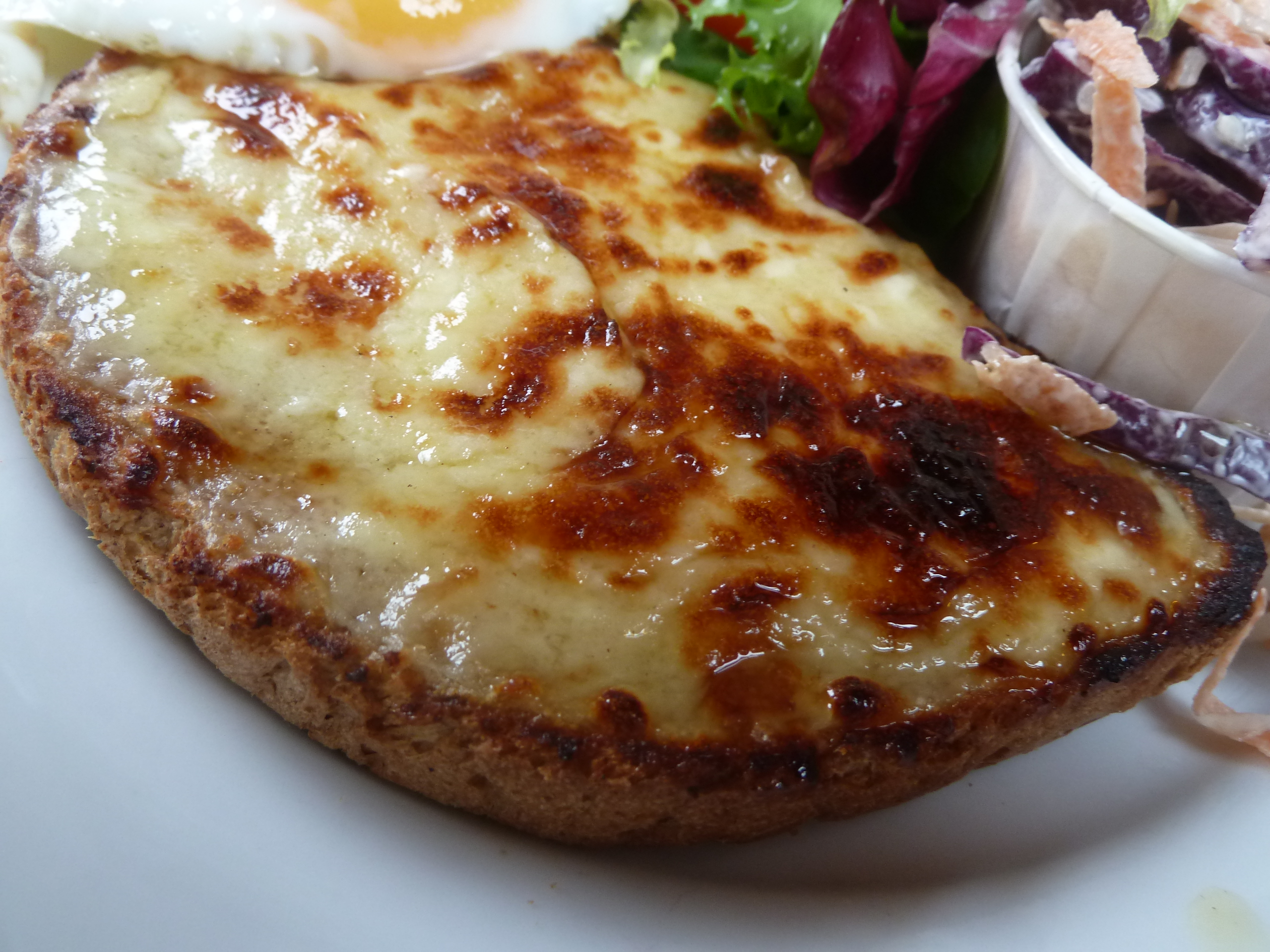
- Alternative names: Welsh rabbit
- Type: Savoury
- Place of origin: United Kingdom
- Main ingredients: Cheese, bread
- Variations: English rabbit, Scotch rabbit, buck rabbit, golden buck, blushing bunny, Hot Brown

Welsh rarebit, (Note: Pronounced /ˈrɛərbɪt/ RAIR-bit, also /ˈræbɪt/ RAB-it) also spelled Welsh rabbit, is a dish of hot cheese sauce, often including ale, mustard, or Worcestershire sauce, served on toasted bread. The origins of the name are unknown, though the earliest recorded use is 1725 as "Welsh rabbit", a jocular name as the dish contains no rabbit; the earliest documented use of "Welsh rarebit" is in 1781.

Though there is no strong evidence that the dish originated in Welsh cuisine, it is sometimes identified with the Welsh dish caws pobi, (Note: Welsh pronunciation: [kaus ˈpɔbɪ], lit. 'baked cheese') documented in the 1500s.

== Sauce ==
Some recipes simply melt grated cheese on toast, making it identical to cheese on toast. Others make the sauce of cheese, ale, and mustard, and garnished with cayenne pepper or paprika. Other recipes add wine or Worcestershire sauce. The sauce may also blend cheese and mustard into a béchamel sauce.

== Variants ==
Hannah Glasse, in her 1747 cookbook The Art of Cookery, gives close variants "Scotch rabbit", "Welsh rabbit" and two versions of "English rabbit".

To make a Scotch rabbit, toast a piece of bread very nicely on both sides, butter it, cut a slice of cheese about as big as the bread, toast it on both sides, and lay it on the bread.

To make a Welsh rabbit, toast the bread on both sides, then toast the cheese on one side, lay it on the toast, and with a hot iron brown the other side. You may rub it over with mustard.

To make an English rabbit, toast a slice of bread brown on both sides, lay it in a plate before the fire, pour a glass of red wine over it, and let it soak the wine up; then cut some cheese very thin and lay it very thick over the bread, and put it in a tin oven before the fire, and it will be toasted and browned presently. Serve it away hot.

Or do it thus. Toast the bread and soak it in the wine, set it before the fire, cut your cheese in very thin slices, rub butter over the bottom of a plate, lay the cheese on, pour in two or three spoonfuls of white wine, cover it with another plate, set it over a chafing-dish of hot coals for two or three minutes, then stir it till it is done and well mixed. You may stir in a little mustard; when it is enough lay it on the bread, just brown it with a hot shovel.

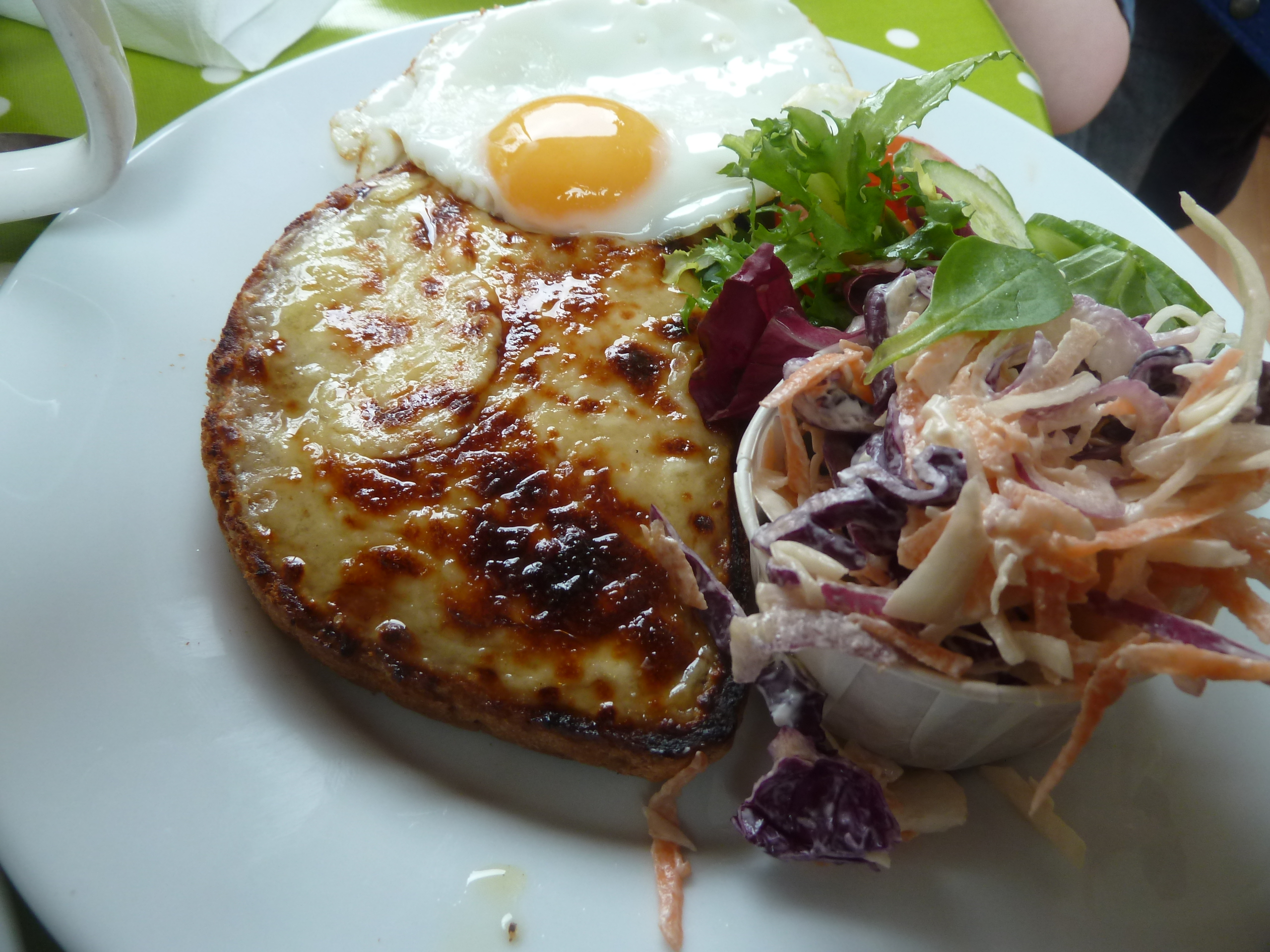
Buck rarebit (Welsh rarebit with an egg)

Served with an egg on top, it makes a buck rabbit or a golden buck.

Welsh rarebit blended with tomato (or tomato soup) makes a blushing bunny.

In France, un Welsh is popular in the Nord-Pas-de-Calais and Côte d'Opale regions.

== Name ==
The first recorded reference to the dish was "Welsh rabbit" in 1725 in an English context, but the origin of the term is unknown. It was probably intended to be jocular.

=== Welsh ===
"Welsh" was probably used as a pejorative dysphemism, meaning "anything substandard or vulgar", or that "the closest thing to rabbit the Welsh could afford was melted cheese on toast". Or it may simply allude to the "frugal diet of the upland Welsh". Other examples of such jocular food names are Welsh caviar (laverbread); Essex lion (calf); Norfolk capon (kipper); Irish apricot (potato); Rocky Mountain oysters (bull testicles); and Scotch woodcock (scrambled eggs and anchovies on toast).

The dish may have been attributed to the Welsh because they were fond of roasted cheese: "I am a Welshman, I do love cause boby, good roasted cheese." (1542) "Cause boby" is Welsh caws pobi 'baked cheese', but it is unclear whether this is related to Welsh rabbit.

=== Rabbit and rarebit ===
The word rarebit is a corruption of rabbit, "Welsh rabbit" being first recorded in 1725, and "rarebit" in 1781. Rarebit is not used on its own, except in alluding to the dish. In 1785, Francis Grose defined a "Welch rabbit" [sic] as "a Welch rare bit", without saying which came first. Later writers were more explicit: for example, Schele de Vere in 1866 clearly considers "rabbit" to be a corruption of "rarebit".

Many commentators have mocked the misconstrual of the jocular "rabbit" as the serious "rarebit":

- Brander Matthews (1892): "few [writers] are as ignorant and dense as the unknown unfortunate who first tortured the obviously jocular Welsh rabbit into a pedantic and impossible Welsh rarebit..."
- Sir John Rhŷs (1901): "It is best known to Englishmen as 'Welsh rabbit', which superior persons 'ruling the roast' in our kitchens choose to make into rarebit: how they would deal with 'Scotch woodcock' and 'Oxford hare,' I do not know."
- Sivert N. Hagen (1904): "Welsh rabbit... is of jocular origin... Where, however, the word is used by the sophisticated, it is often 'corrected' to Welsh rarebit, as if 'rare bit'"
- Ambrose Bierce (1911): "Rarebit n. A Welsh rabbit, in the speech of the humorless, who point out that it is not a rabbit. To whom it may be solemnly explained that the comestible known as toad in the hole is really not a toad, and that ris de veau à la financière is not the smile of a calf prepared after the recipe of a she banker."
- H. W. Fowler (1926): "Welsh Rabbit is amusing and right. Welsh Rarebit is stupid and wrong."

Welsh rabbit has become a standard savoury listed by culinary authorities including Auguste Escoffier, Louis Saulnier and others; they tend to use rarebit, communicating to a non-English audience that it is not a meat dish.

"Eighteenth-century English cookbooks reveal that it was then considered to be a luscious supper or tavern dish, based on the fine cheddar-type cheeses and the wheat bread [...]. Surprisingly, it seems there was not only a Welsh Rabbit, but also an English Rabbit, an Irish and a Scotch Rabbit, but nary a rarebit."

== In culture ==
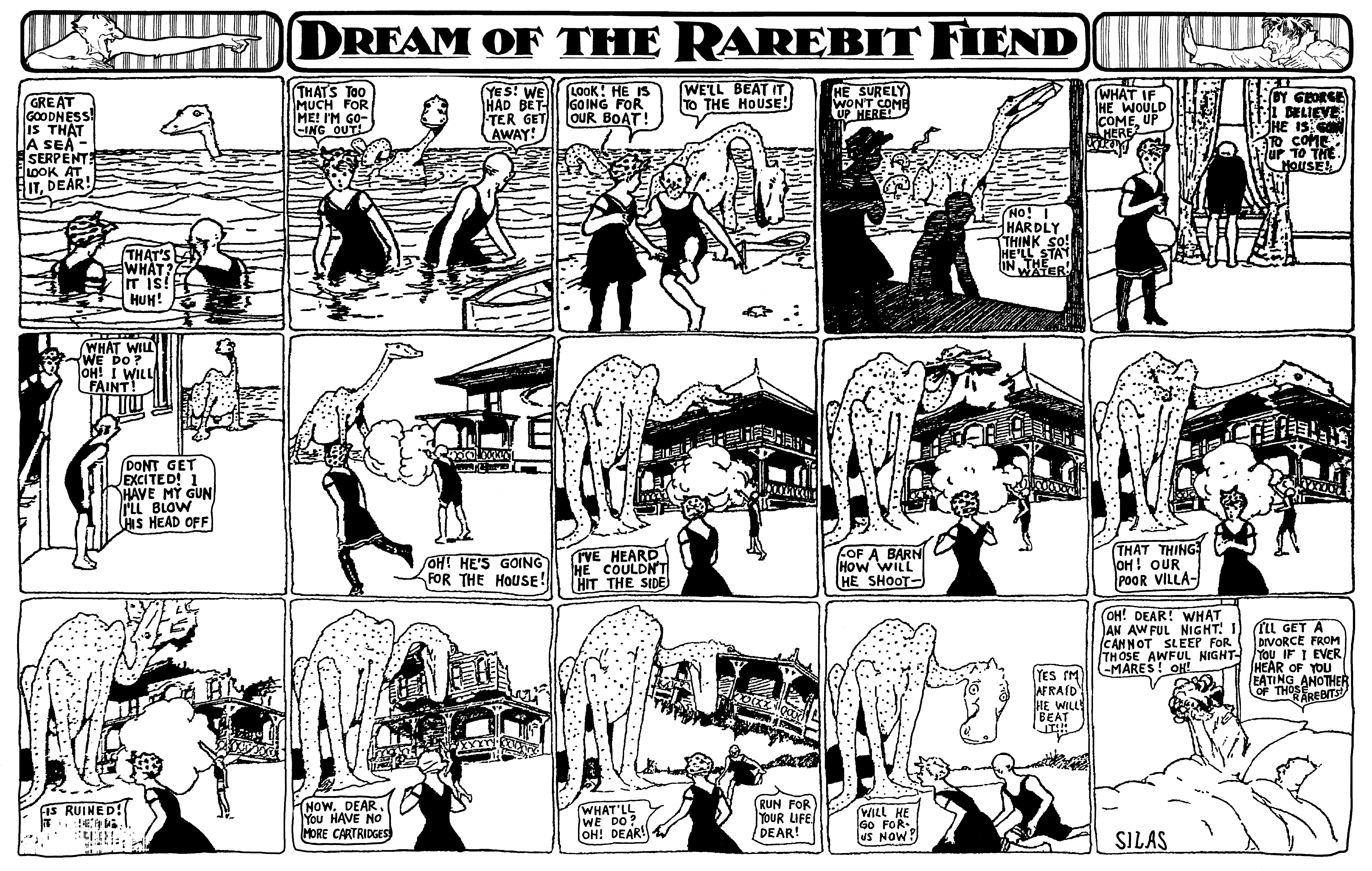
Dream of the Rarebit Fiend by Winsor McCay

The notion that toasted cheese was a favourite dish irresistible to the Welsh has existed since the Middle Ages. In A C Merie Talys (100 Merry Tales), a printed book of jokes of AD 1526, it is told that God became weary of all the Welshmen in Heaven, 'which with their krakynge and babelynge trobelyd all the others', and asked the Porter of Heaven Gate, St Peter, to do something about it. So St Peter went outside the gates and called in a loud voice, 'Cause bobe, yt is as moche to say as rostyd chese', at which all the Welshmen ran out, and when St Peter saw they were all outside, he went in and locked the gates, which is why there are no Welshmen in heaven. The 1526 compiler says he found this story 'Wryten amonge olde gestys'.

Welsh rarebit supposedly causes vivid dreams. The 1902 book Welsh Rarebit Tales is a collection of short horror stories supposedly from members of a writing club who ate a dinner which included a large portion of rarebit immediately before sleeping in order to give themselves inspiring dreams. Winsor McCay's comic strip series Dream of the Rarebit Fiend recounts the fantastic dreams that various characters have because they ate a Welsh rarebit before going to bed.

A humorous appendix of anonymous authorship is sometimes added to the end of Thomas Browne's Pseudodoxia Epidemica, debating the existence and nature of the 'Welsh Rabbit' as though it were a real animal.

== See also ==
- Other dishes of toasted bread and melted cheese:
  - Cheese roll
  - Croque-monsieur and croque-madame
  - Grilled cheese sandwich
  - Horseshoe sandwich
  - Hot Brown
  - Khachapuri
  - Mollete
  - Monte Cristo sandwich
  - Quesadilla
  - Savoury toast
- Welsh cuisine
