= Len Fisher =

Australian physicist (born 1942)

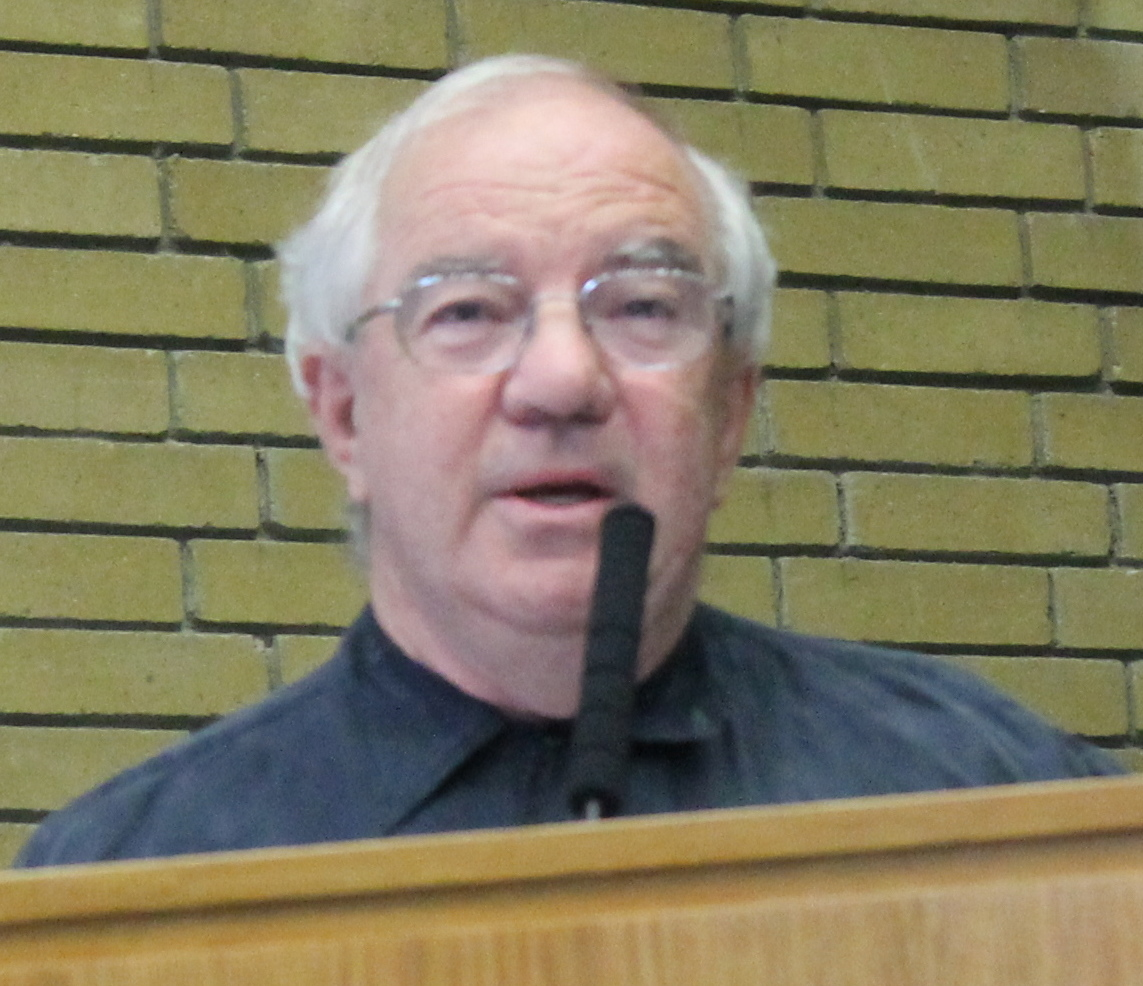
- Len Fisher presenting a paper on mummia at the Oxford Symposium on Food and Cookery in 2012
- Born: Leonard Ross Fisher; 1942 (age 83–84)
- Awards: Order of Australia, Ig Nobel Prize

Academic background
- Education: University of Sydney, University of New South Wales, Macquarie University, University of Bristol

Academic work
- Discipline: Physicist
- Institutions: University of Bristol
- Website: Official website

Leonard Ross Fisher OAM (born 1942) is an Australian physicist, and visiting senior research fellow at the University of Bristol, UK. He is known for his research into everyday topics, such as the optimal way to dunk a biscuit, and the optimum use of cheese in a cheese sandwich.

== Education ==
Fisher received a BSc in chemistry and pure mathematics, and an MSc in radiation chemistry from the University of Sydney. He has a PhD in physics of surfaces from the University of New South Wales.

== Career ==
Fisher has been a visiting senior research fellow in the school of physics at the University of Bristol since 1992.

=== Research ===
In 1998, Fisher published a study on the optimal way to dunk a biscuit. The study concluded that 10 times more flavour is released from a biscuit if it has first been dunked in a hot drink. This research was funded by McVities.

In 2000, Fisher studied the absorption of gravy by a roast dinner. He found that 700,000 litres of gravy is wasted every week in the UK when it is poured on food and not consumed. He also calculated a gravy absorption index, and published a set of rules to maximise the absorption of gravy by food. Following on from this work, in 2001, he researched the best bread to absorb gravy with, concluding that ciabatta soaks up the most.

In 2003, Fisher produced a report for the British Cheese Board, titled "Optimum Use of Cheese in a Cheese Sandwich". He found that the optimum thickness for the filling in a cheese sandwich is dependent on the type of cheese used, and that the sandwich should be made with a light spread of butter or margarine to enhance the flavour of the cheese. This research has drawn criticism for being 'frivolous'.

== Publications ==
- How to Dunk a Doughnut: The Science of Everyday Life (2002)
- Weighing the Soul: The Evolution of Scientific Ideas (2004)
- Rock, Paper, Scissors: Game Theory in Everyday Life (2008)
- The Perfect Swarm: The Science of Complexity in Everyday Life (2009)
- Crashes, Crises and Calamities: How We Can Use Science to Read the Early-Warning Signs (2011)

== Awards ==
Fisher was presented with the Ig Nobel Prize for Physics, in 1999, for calculating the optimal way to dunk a biscuit.

In 2004, Fisher was named Science Writer of the Year by the American Institute of Physics for How to Dunk a Doughnut: The Science of Everyday Life.

In 2019, Fisher was awarded the Medal of the Order of Australia for his contribution to science.

== See also ==
- List of Ig Nobel Prize winners
