= Cheese on toast =

British dish of melted cheese

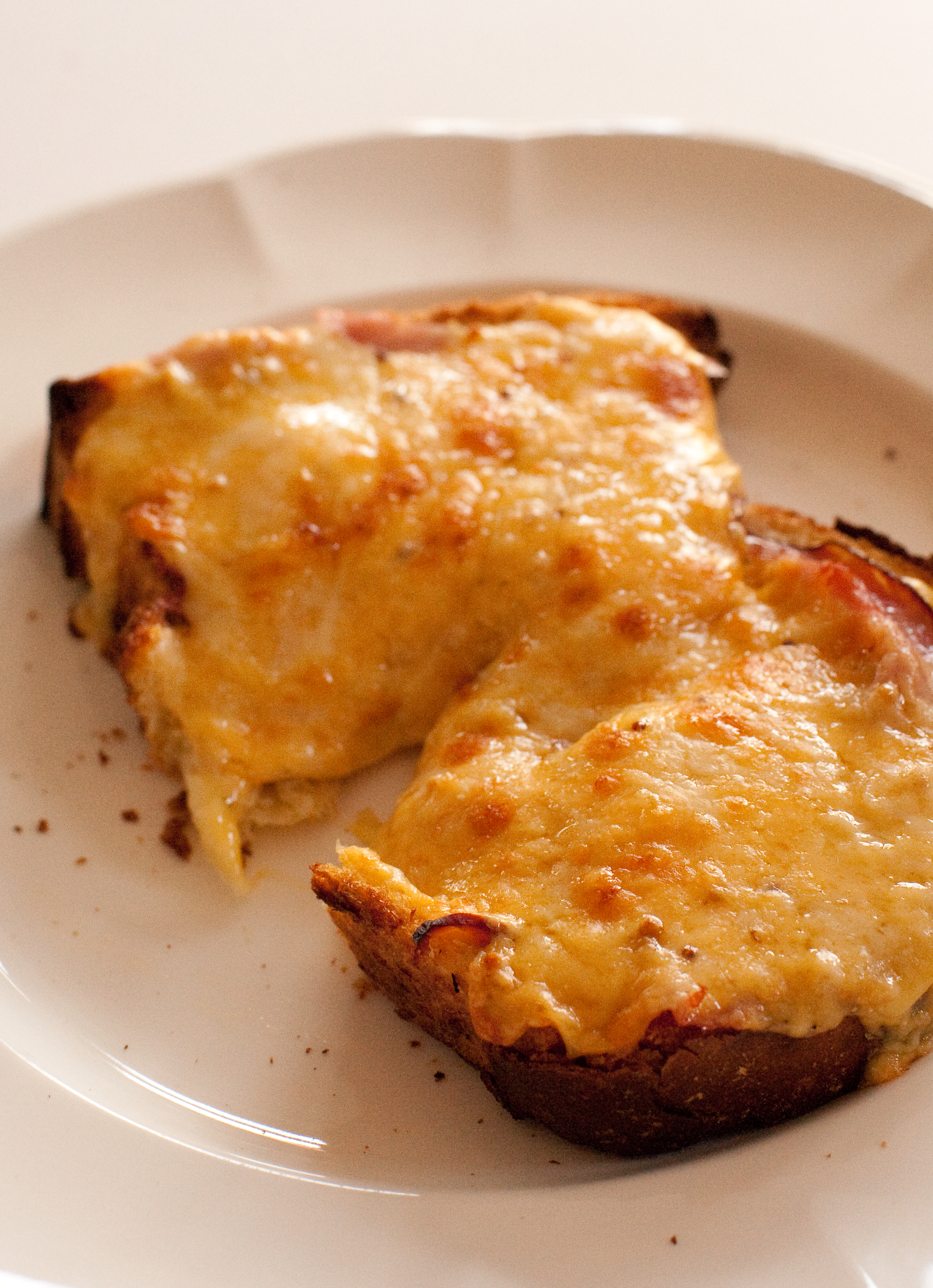
- Cheese on toast, on a plate
- Place of origin: United Kingdom
- Main ingredients: Sliced bread, cheese, sometimes butter

Cheese on toast is made by placing sliced or grated cheese on toasted bread and melting it under a grill. It is popular in the United Kingdom, Ireland, Australia, New Zealand, the Caribbean, the United States, and in African countries. A similar American meal is the cheese dream, an open-faced version of a grilled cheese sandwich.

== Recipes ==
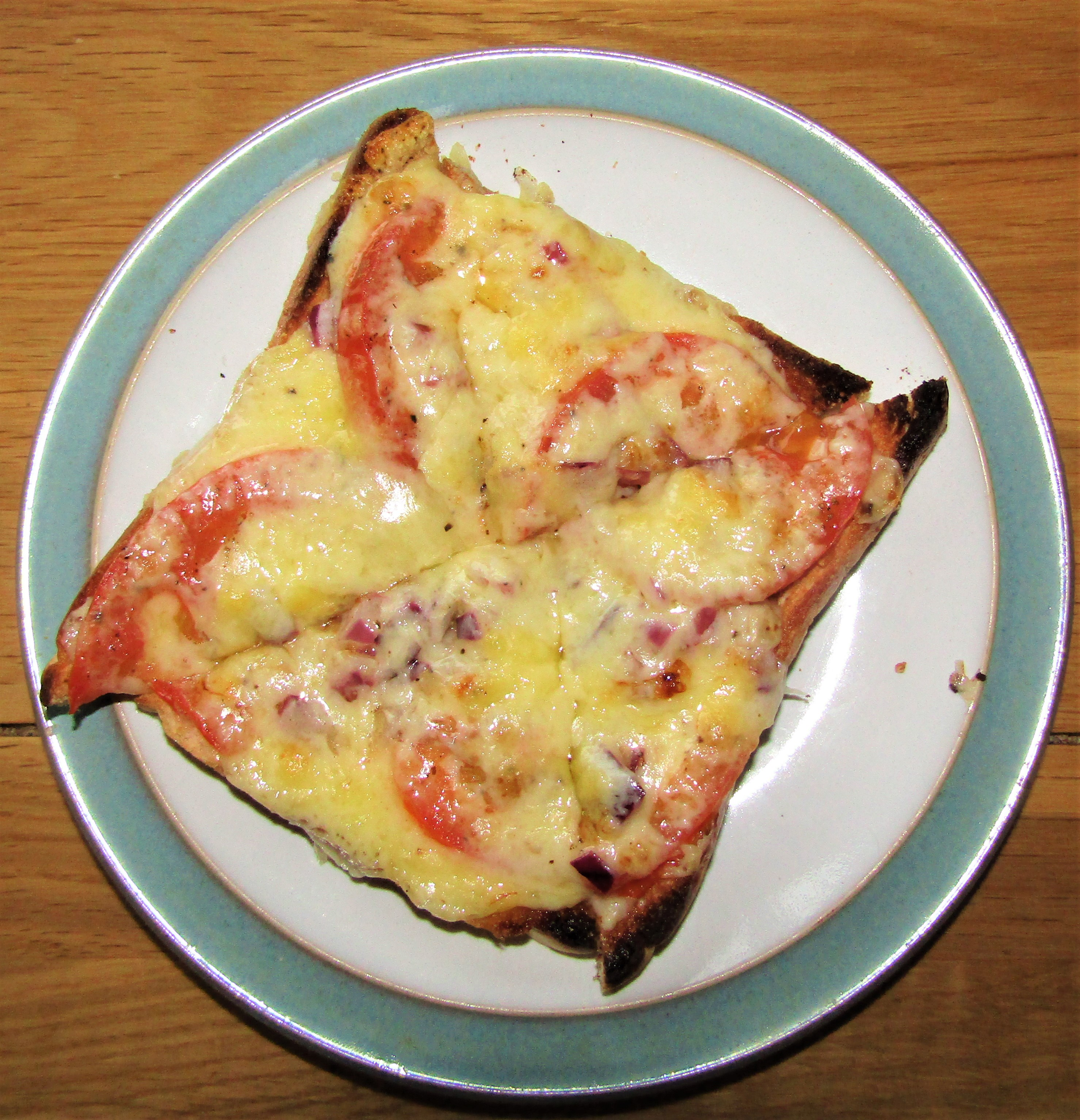
Cheese on toast, with tomato and red onion

Cheese on toast consists of toast (toasted on both sides or just one side), with cheese placed on it and then grilled. Further toppings are optional, such as chopped spring onions or Worcestershire sauce.

Recipe books and internet articles tend to elaborate on the basics, adding ingredients and specifying accompaniments to make more interesting reading. Consequently, published recipes seldom deal with the most basic form of the dish and frequently refer to the similar dish of Welsh rarebit as "posh cheese on toast".

Cheddar cheese is most commonly used for cheese on toast, as it is a particularly good cheese for toasting. Lancashire dairies, in conjunction with a "National Cheese Toast Day", have promoted Lancashire cheese as the best cheese to use.

== Cheese dream ==
The cheese dream is an open-faced version of the American grilled cheese sandwich made with bread and cheese, cooked with oil, margarine, or butter. Optional additions on include bacon, avocado, pineapple, eggs, sliced tomato, olives and pickles. James Beard described it as "a slice of tomato on bread, covered with American cheese which was melted under the broiler and then graced with crisp bacon". One 1932 recipe suggests sprinkling the cheese "very sparingly" with a bit of mustard, cayenne "and a little minced red sweet pepper"; it was browned on both sides and served with "very hot, rich tomato sauce."

It can be cooked in a pan or skillet on the stove top, under a broiler or using a pan in the oven. In its simplest form, it consists of a slice of bread, topped with American cheese, and broiled until the cheese puffs up and browns.

The cheese dream is said to have originated during the Great Depression, as "an inexpensive company supper dish" and an inexpensive option for feeding friends and family at Sunday supper. But it was already mentioned in 1918 recipe as a luncheon dish, "our teahouse friend."

Cheese dreams were advertised in 1957 as a 55-cent (equivalent to $6.30 in 2025) luncheonette lenten special in Daytona Beach, Florida's Sunday News Journal.

The term cheese dream has also been used to describe grilled cheese sandwiches, and, in one instance, to croque monsieur.

== See also ==
- Beans on toast, another simple dish made with slices of bread and a topping
- Cheese sandwich
- Grilled cheese, a hot cheese sandwich in the United States
- Hot Brown
- Open sandwich
- Parmo, a chicken cutlet topped with grilled cheese
- Uunijuusto, a Finnish speciality based on bovine colostrum
- Welsh rarebit, the cheese sauce based dish
- List of bread dishes
- List of toast dishes
