= Cheese roll =

New Zealand snack food

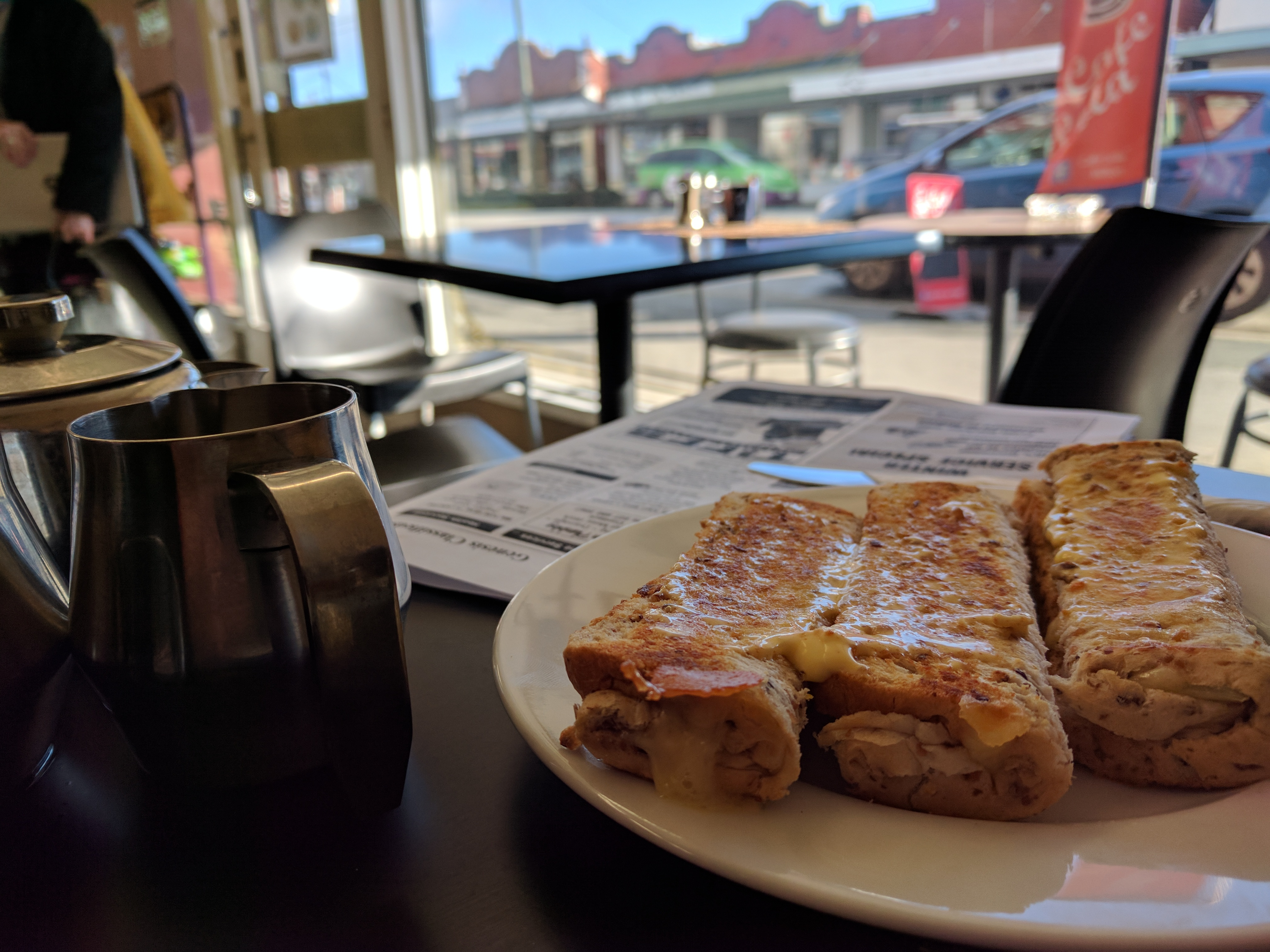
- Cheese rolls at a café in Milton, Otago, New Zealand
- Alternative names: Cheese roll-up Southern sushi
- Place of origin: New Zealand
- Region or state: Southland
- Main ingredients: Bread, cheese

A cheese roll (occasionally known by the older name of cheese roll-up) is a New Zealand snack food similar to Welsh rarebit, but created by covering a slice of bread in a prepared filling consisting mainly of grated or sliced cheese, and then rolling it into a tube shape before toasting. Cheese rolls are a very popular food in Otago and Southland Region, where they are commonly found as a menu item at cafeterias and similar food outlets. They are one of a small number of recipes which are specific to only one of New Zealand's two main islands.

== Recipes ==
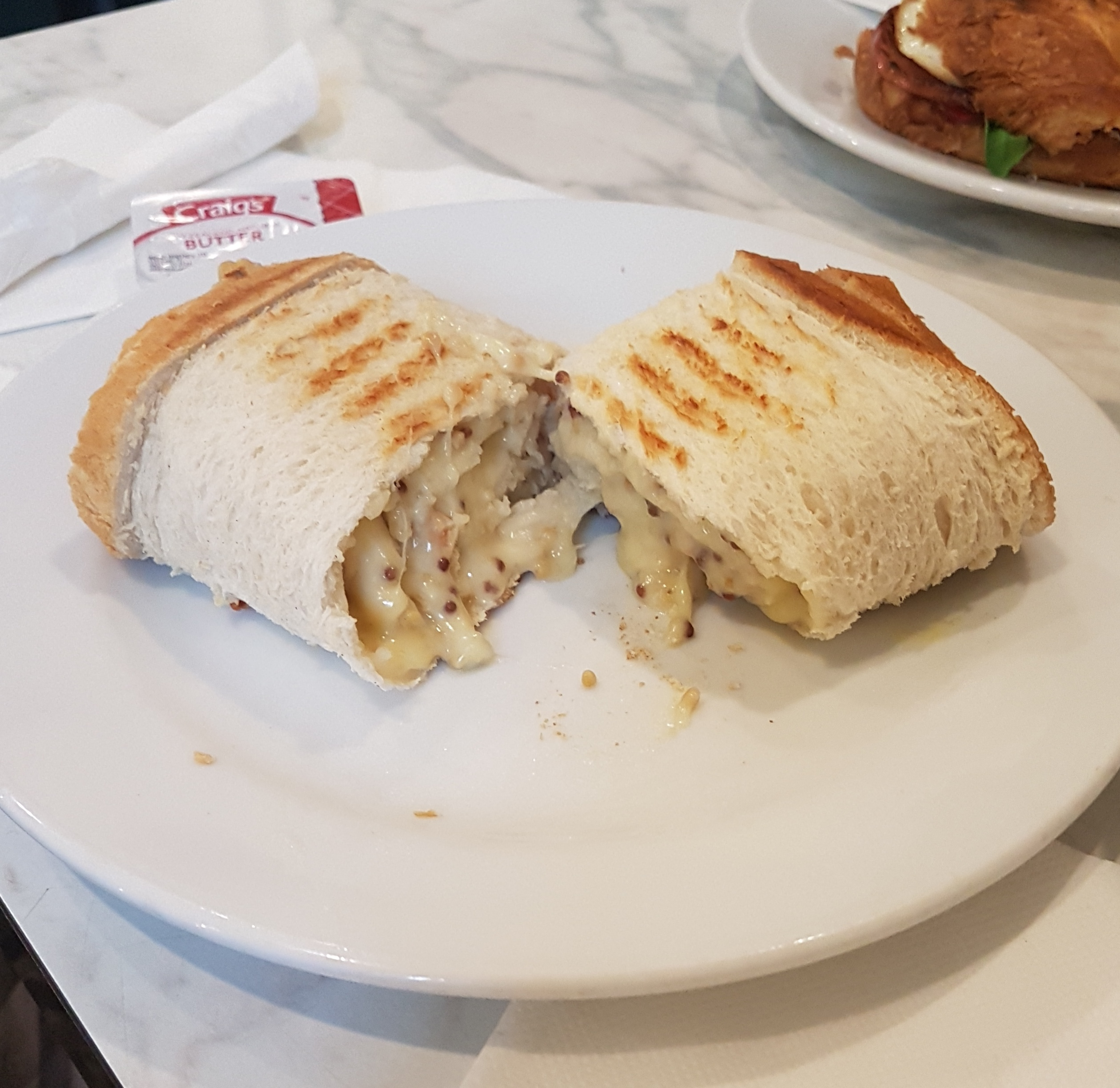
Cheese roll

The dish is simple to prepare, involving at minimum a slice of bread and cheese. More often, added ingredients are placed into a filling mixture, which is prepared earlier. These ingredients typically include onion, Worcestershire sauce, and onion soup mix, though other fillings, such as crushed pineapple or sweet corn are also known. This filling mixture is prepared separately before being added to the bread.

The bread is kept in a rolled shape either by breaking the crust so that the slice does not spring back into a flattened shape or by skewering the bread with toothpicks. The outer side of the roll is occasionally coated thinly in butter before toasting to add to the flavour and give the toasted roll a more golden appearance.

Food researchers, notably Professor Helen Leach of the University of Otago, have identified three basic traditional styles of filling, with all known recipes seemingly a variant of these three. The first of these recipes developed as a spread in the 1920s, prior to the invention of cheese rolls, using a specific spicy Australia cheese, Rex Cheese. Variants on this style of filling include the use of spicy or strong cheese with mustard, Worcestershire sauce, and even liqueurs such as Kahlúa. A second basic recipe again used spicy cheese, but this time mixed with savoury ingredients such as onion, which was cooked in butter or milk, mixed with the cheese, then thickened with flour or cornflour. A third version is similar to the second, but uses pre-processed food items as major ingredients, most notably dried onion soup mix and evaporated milk.

== History ==
Early recipes for the dish date from the 1930s, with the earliest appearing in the New Zealand newspaper New Zealand Truth in 1935. The popularity of the dish seems to have taken off with the widespread availability of sliced bread from the 1950s. Early recipes referred to the dish under the seemingly disparaging name of "rat traps", a play on the longstanding nickname of "mouse traps" used for cheese on toast, but also likely a reference to the cylindrical shape, which was similar to commercial rodent traps of the era. The earliest known cookbook recipe for cheese rolls dates from Dunedin's Roslyn Church Jubilee Cookery Book in 1951, with numerous other South Island community cookbooks listing the recipe in the decade that followed. Cheese rolls were not found in any North Island cookbooks, however, until the late 1970s, and the food is still little known north of Waitaki River. The roll gained popularity in the south due to the cold climate and prevalence of soup as a meal option, especially during the frigid winter months. Artisan variations using different cheese and bread varieties have now become a regional feature in restaurants.

In 2010 a local referred to the food as southern sushi on a blog. The term has been used by Auckland comedian Rhys Darby, although an Invercargill cafe owner disputed the usage of the term.

== Fundraisers ==
Occasionally "cheese roll fundraisers" are held, especially by schools and sports groups, similar to sausage sizzles or barbecues. Recent rises in the cost of dairy products have made these fundraisers less profitable than before.

== See also ==
- List of stuffed dishes
