= Cheese sandwich =

Sandwich with cheese as the main ingredient

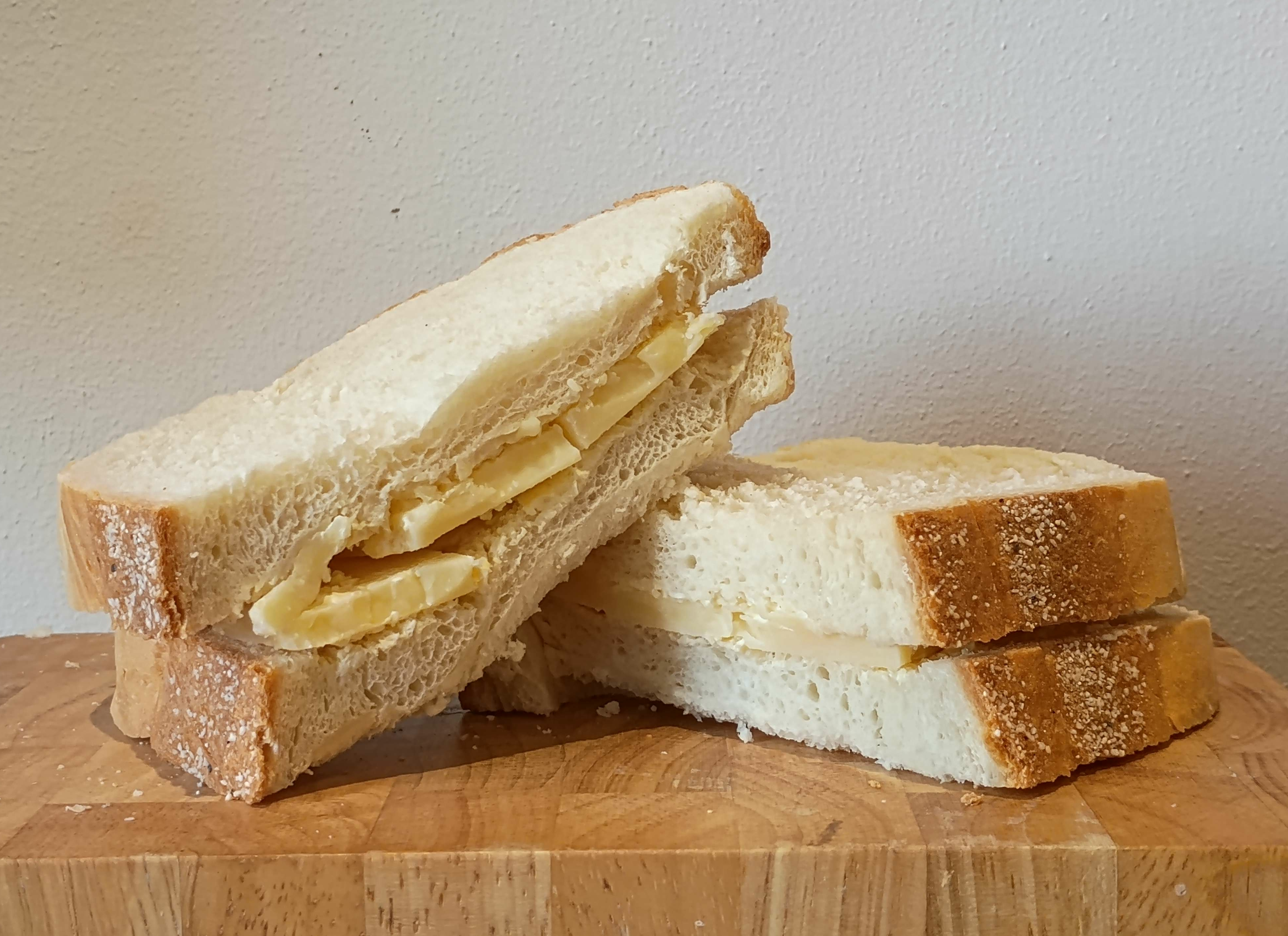
- A cheddar cheese sandwich, sliced in half
- Main ingredients: Cheese, bread, sometimes butter
- Variations: Grilled cheese, cheese dream, cheese toastie

A cheese sandwich is a sandwich made with cheese between slices of bread, sometimes buttered. Typically, semi-hard cheeses are used for the filling, such as cheddar, Red Leicester, or Double Gloucester. A Guardian article described the cheese sandwich as a "British lunchtime staple." Using a pie iron or frying pan can transform the cheese sandwich into a grilled cheese.

When a meat sandwich is prepared, the cheese becomes an accompaniment, and the sandwich is known by other names such as a ham sandwich or tuna fish sandwich. If the cheese is melted on such a sandwich, it is often referred to as a melt sandwich.

== History ==
While the origin of the cheese sandwich is not known, some interpretations of William Shakespeare's 1602 play, The Merry Wives of Windsor, report that the line "I love not the humour of bread and cheese" was the first written reference to a cheese sandwich.

In January 1889, in Greenville, Pennsylvania, Henry Hoffman, George Smith, and Teddy Atkins participated in a cheese sandwich eating contest. Hoffman won the contest by eating 16 sandwiches in 15 minutes.

== Variants ==
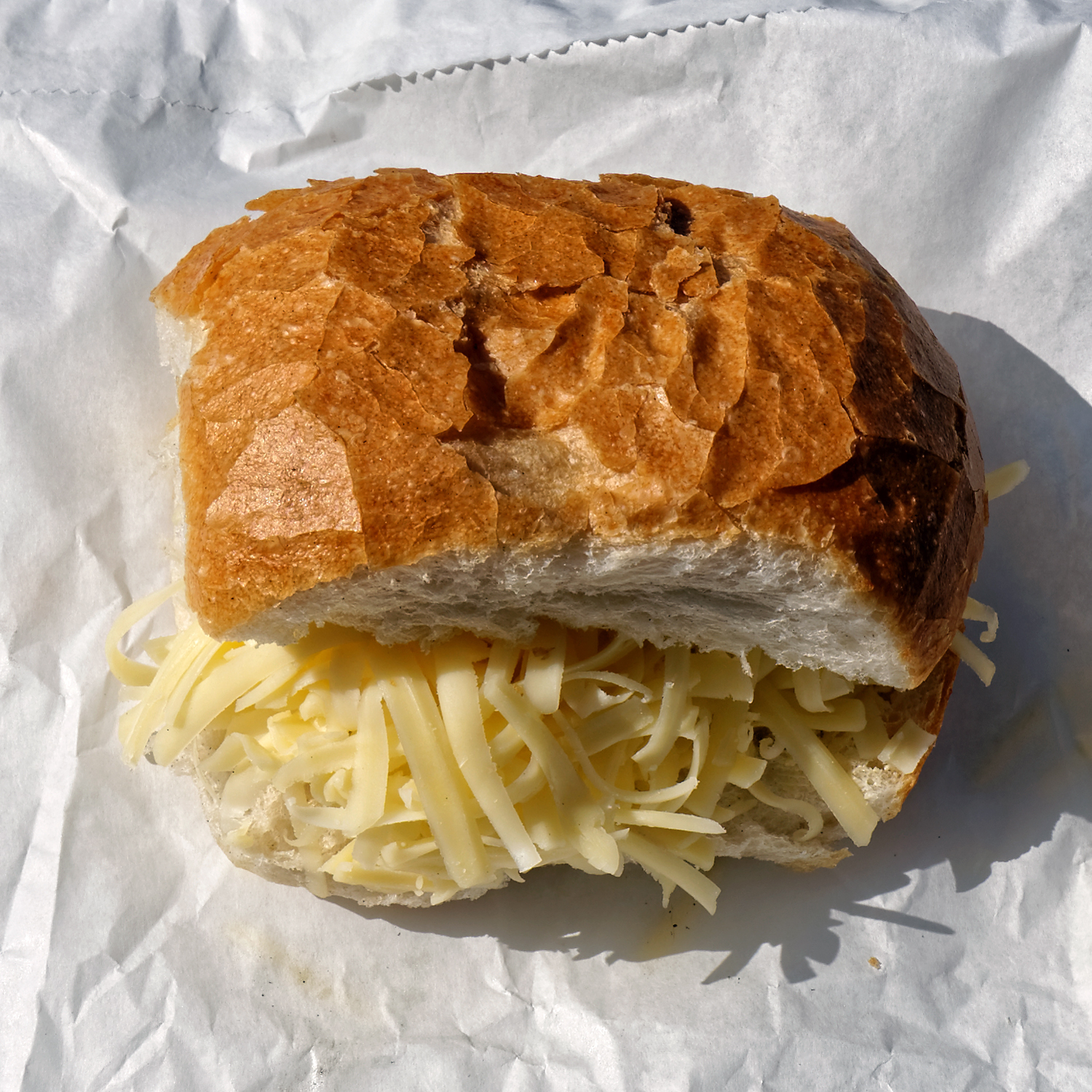
Grated cheese in a bread roll

Popular British variants of the cheese sandwich include the cheese and pickle sandwich, the cheese and tomato sandwich, and the cheese and onion sandwich.

The grilled cheese is a popular variation of the cheese sandwich, in which the sandwich is heated until the cheese melts. In the southern United States, the pimento cheese sandwich is a traditional favorite.

An Italian variation is the carrozza, a mozzarella cheese sandwich coated in egg and flour and then fried.

== Popularity ==
By 2014, the cheese sandwich was declining in popularity in the United Kingdom. A survey of 2,000 adults' eating habits conducted by YouGov in December 2014 found that 55% of British adults had not eaten a cheese sandwich during the previous week. In response, in 2015, Anchor Cheddar launched a campaign using a bus designed to look like a cheese sandwich to encourage the consumption of this food.

In 2017, a survey by YouGov found that 36% of British people said cheese was their favorite sandwich filling. In 2018, another survey of 2,000 British people found that a plain cheese sandwich was the most popular type of sandwich. However, by 2020, a similar study showed that the plain cheese sandwich had become less popular, with the bacon sandwich emerging as the new favorite.

== Health warnings ==
In 2008, the Food Standards Agency warned that a cheese sandwich contains more than half the recommended daily amount of saturated fat.

In 2012, Action on Salt campaigned for cheese sandwiches to carry a health warning. The group reported that the high quantities of salt in the main ingredients of a cheese sandwich could lead to children consuming an excessive amount. In response, the Dairy Council stated that it was incorrect to claim that cheese sandwiches are not healthy. Action on Salt later retracted the press release, citing an error.

== Research ==
A study by the Australian physicist Len Fisher at the University of Bristol in 2003 found that the optimal thickness for the filling in a cheese sandwich depends on the type of cheese used, and that the sandwich should be made with a light spread of butter or margarine to enhance the flavor of the cheese.

This research has been criticized as "frivolous".

== In popular culture ==
The 1903 British short silent documentary film, The Cheese Mites, features a man making a cheese sandwich and examining it with a magnifying glass as its main storyline.

In the 2001 film Freddy Got Fingered, the main character, Gord (played by Tom Green), works at a cheese sandwich factory.

The My Little Pony: Friendship Is Magic character Cheese Sandwich (voiced by "Weird Al" Yankovic) has a cheese sandwich as his cutie mark.

== See also ==
- Grilled cheese
- List of sandwiches
