= American cookbooks in the 1950s =

Cookbooks over the span of a decade

In the 1950s, commercial cookbooks gained popularity in the United States. These cookbooks frequently suggested the use of packaged food and electric appliances, which had become more available due to the post-war economic boom. Cookbooks reflected these changes. Betty Crocker and Julia Child became popular icons in American culture through their cookbooks and the media during this era. Cookbooks also reflected many cultural trends of the 1950s, especially typical gender roles and racial identities. Many cookbooks were addressed to the white, middle-class housewife who cooked for her family in their suburban home. These cookbooks often excluded African-American, immigrant, and rural women. For them, handwritten cookbooks served as both personal histories and a means to express their views on politics and society. Meanwhile, advertisements promoted the racial stereotype of the “black mammy” that de-feminized African-American cooks in white households. Ethnic immigrants were also debased as European Americans baked their distinct cuisines into generic casseroles.

== Background ==
The 1950s were a time of great economic prosperity in America. It is estimated that disposable income in America increased by five times from 1940 to 1955. This prosperity was evident in an abundance of consumer goods, especially food. For example, the average grocery store in 1952 stocked 4,000 items, compared to the average store in 1928, which only stocked 870. More options and more food on the shelf combined with the encouraged gender-roles of the era created a “boom” in the cookbook industry, mostly targeted at housewives. Kitchenware also diversified as manufacturers marketed everything from electric toasters and microwaves to cherry pitters and ice cream molds as gadgets for the convenience of women.

== Notable cookbooks ==
=== Betty Crocker’s Picture Cook Book (1950) ===
Also known as “Big Red,” this cookbook was a national bestseller, becoming the most popular non-fiction book of the year. Between 1951 and 1958, the second edition sold 732,004 copies. The book featured step-by-step photographs to accompany the instructions and many of the recipes recommended the use of various pre-packaged foods. While the Betty Crocker brand had existed since the 1920s, this cookbook was the first of many Betty Crocker cookbooks. Others included Betty Crocker’s Cookbook for Boys and Girls and various updated editions of the picture cookbook released subsequently.

Betty Crocker's Cook Book for Boys and Girls, published 1957

== Cookbook varieties ==
=== Handwritten cookbooks and rural women's history ===
Farm life in the 1950s is often idealized, but these families faced isolation, disease, and natural disasters. For rural women, cookbooks were an outlet for their experiences — the only piece of writing they produced. Cookbooks improved female literacy and served as a medium for the social commentary of rural women. Evelyn Birkby's Up A Country Lane Cookbook is not only a compilation of recipes, but also a description of life in a rural town in Iowa in the mid-twentieth century. In contrast to suburban housewives, rural women relied on handwritten cookbooks. Handwritten cookbooks better preserved the individual identities of women, but also gave women the freedom to express their views on politics, culture, and their community.

=== Mass-produced cookbooks and American icons ===
Most American women could not achieve the ideal of the ‘genteel’ housewife as portrayed by mass-produced cookbooks. As an upper-middle class suburban housewife, the fictional Betty Crocker had the advantage of electronic appliances galore, pre-packaged foods, and plastic cookware. Meanwhile, most women lived in rural areas and were lower-middle class or impoverished. Icons like Crocker promoted cooking as “fun,” “creative,” and “professional." With packaged, canned, frozen, and pre-prepared food at their disposal, and outfitted with electrical appliances, cooking could be a luxury for elite women. While electricity was installed in 80 percent of American homes by 1941, it was costly, as well as the appliances that drew on it in the kitchen. Consequently, rural women did not have the time or resources for cooking to be an experimental endeavor.

A successor of Betty Crocker, American icon Julia Child not only promised middle-class women that she could make cooking easy, but that she could make the cook strong and capable. She never explicitly referred to her audience as female, but called them "home cooks." While home cooking was the domain of the women in the mid-twentieth century, the position of the chef was one held almost exclusively by the male sex. Child was a proponent of male involvement in the kitchen both at home and in public.

== Social implications of cookbooks ==
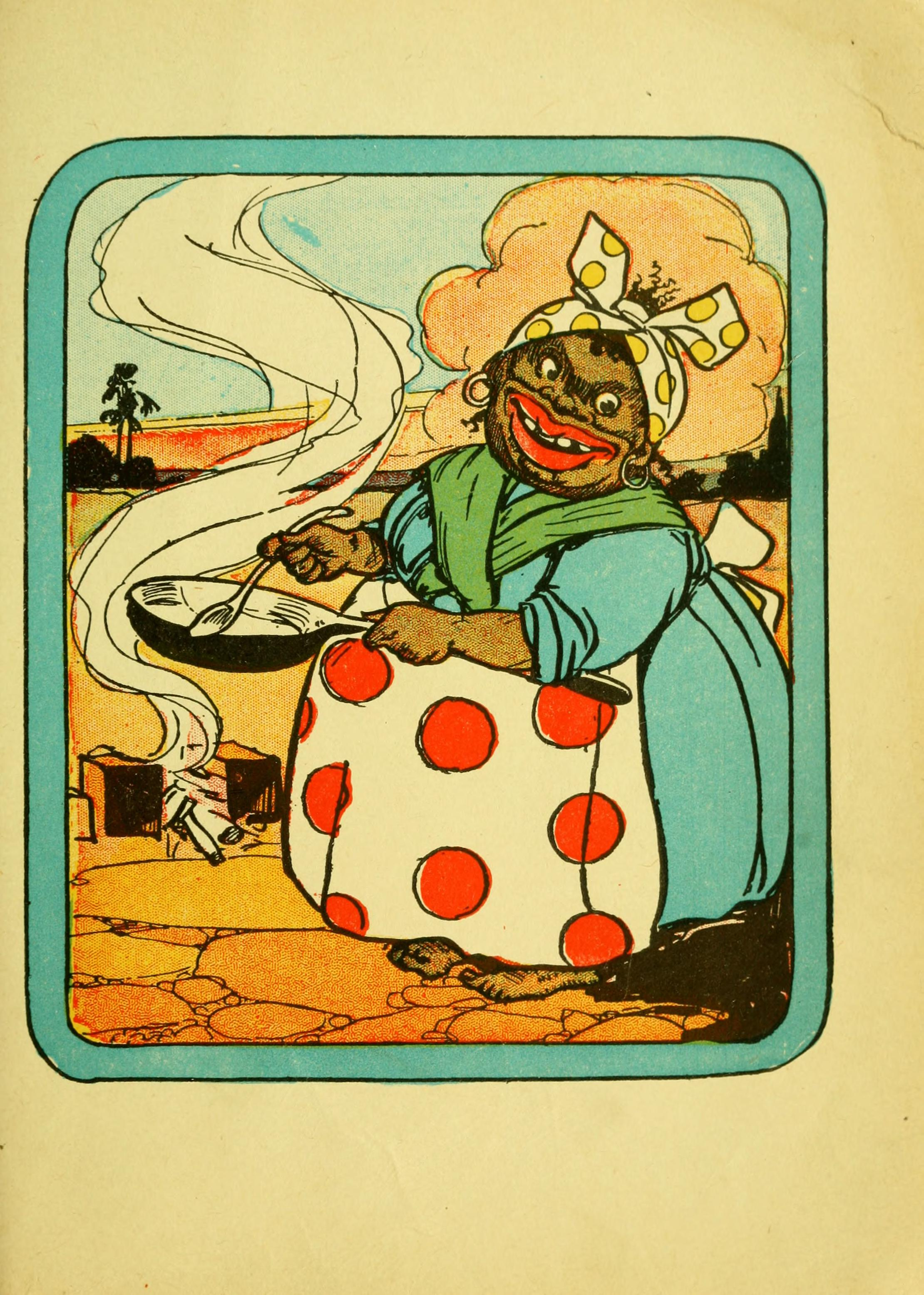
Black Mumbo in the story of Little Black Sambo is emblematic of the Black Mammy. While this version was published in 1908, Little Black Sambo was republished with different versions of Black Mumbo through the 1950s.

=== Women ===
Most 1950s cookbooks were targeted at a female audience. The language and purpose of many cookbooks reflected the gender roles of the era. For example, The Seventeen Cookbook encouraged teenage girls to learn how to cook in order to attract boys: “To many men (and most teen-age boys) cooking is one of the feminine mysteries, one they can heartily appreciate. With an ever-hungry young man, few things enhance a girl's stock as a girl as swiftly, as surely, as something that she made herself." By the 1950s, juvenile cookbooks like Betty Crocker’s Cookbook for Boys and Girls represented both boys and girls on their covers. However, their usage in the home instilled the gender norms of American society in the emerging generation.

Other cookbooks reminded women that it was their responsibility to provide their husband with delicious meals upon his return from work. Historian Jessamyn Neuhaus has pointed out that the perceived necessity of reinforcing gender roles through culinary literature could be evidence of anxiety and uncertainty among women regarding their prescribed roles as housewives and mothers.

=== African Americans ===
In the 1950s, marketing in cookbooks and food packaging was used to differentiate between the superiority of the white housewife and the inferiority of the black ‘mammy cook.’ African-American women were believed to be ‘innate’ cooks, but naturally subject to servitude. Down to the paper identifying a can of beans, black women were characterized as sexual brutes, ugly, strong, and resistant to patriarchal authority. American cookbooks instructed southern women to beat dough for biscuits with all of their human strength for half an hour: alluding, but not directly mentioning, the role of slave women in the making of ‘beat biscuits’. The absence of African-American women from the authors of American cookbooks of the twentieth century reflects their continued social and cultural alienation. While much of American cuisine was drawn from black culture, the distorted icon of the ‘mammy cook’ overrode this contribution in the collective memory of American society.

=== Immigrants ===
Casserole recipes were appealing to middle-class women because they invited experimentation with foreign cuisine. In her cookbook Casserole Specialities, Nedda C. Anders tries her hand at Mexican, Swedish, Armenian, Danish, and Indian cuisine. However, most of these dishes did not call for exotic seasonings: primarily chili powder and salt. This demonstrates how Americans reformulated the cuisine of immigrants to fit their culture through cookbooks in the 1950s. By “going native,” Americans could show off their sophistication and refinement.

== Suburbanization: cooking with kitchenware and boxed food ==
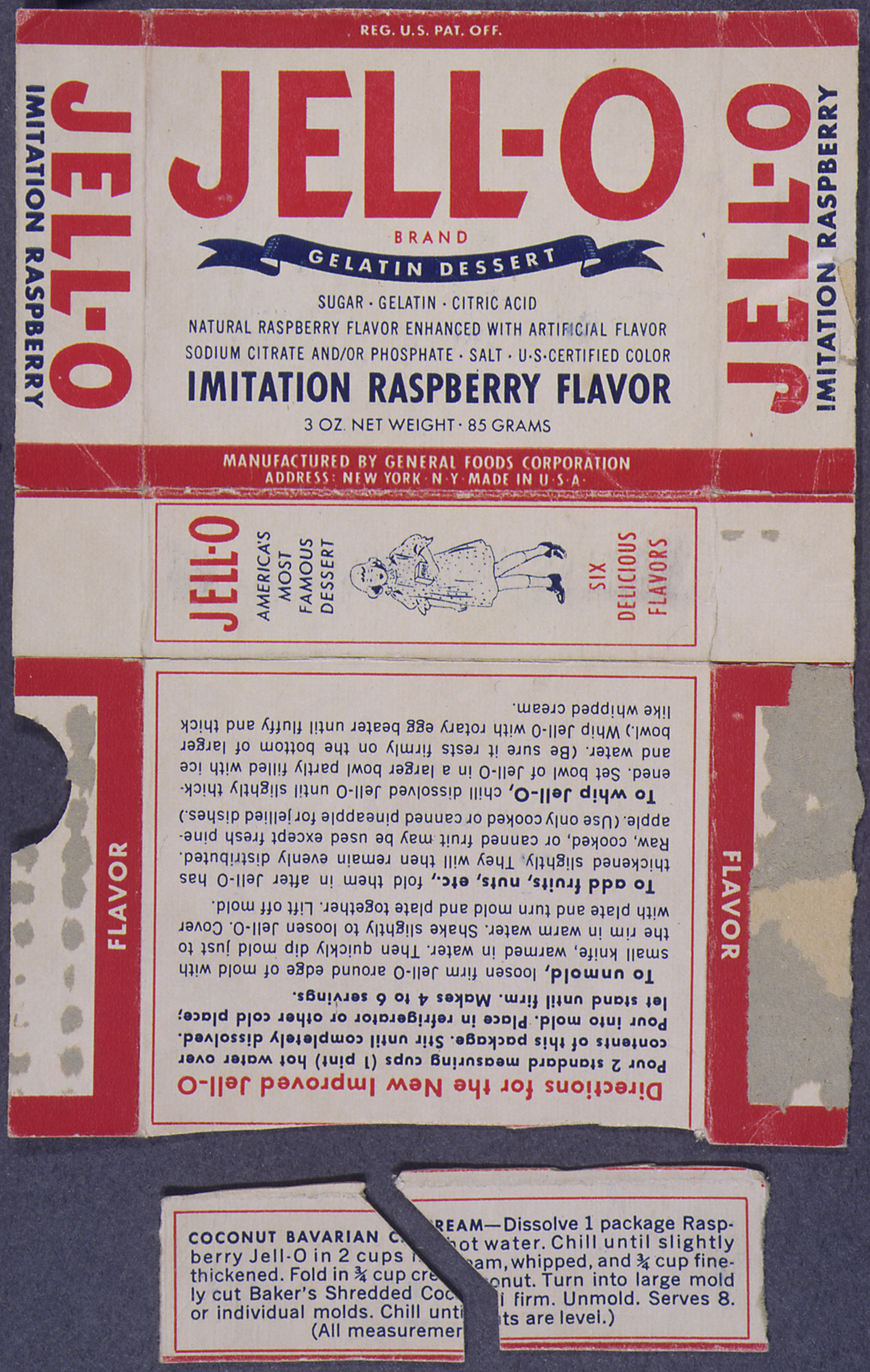
The Jell-O box used to convict Julius and Ethel Rosenberg in 1951.

American cookbooks in the 1950s relied heavily on the abundance of frozen, canned, or boxed food available. While many recipes provided instructions on cooking from scratch, they also included ideas for “doctoring up” pre-packaged soups and meat products. Jell-O, the quintessential American dessert, became increasingly popular in the 1950s as a creative ingredient for salads, puddings, and molded meat dishes.

Advertisements and cookbooks also marketed appliances like the refrigerator. By 1941, 3.5 million electric refrigerators had been sold in the United States, and 52 percent of Americans owned them. Waffle irons, electric mixers, electric ranges, toasters, kettles, and grills soon followed suit. These appliances simplified cooking for women, but also became an indicator of social class and prosperity.

== Gendered recipes ==
=== Dainty dishes ===
Delicate dishes were desirable for women but distasteful for men. Female hosts were expected to serve savory tartlets, sweet tarts, jellies, merengues, macaroon cream, gelatin, and teacakes at their tea parties or other gatherings of women. One such a recipe was a handwritten gift from a grandmother to her granddaughter:

"Kisses for Bessie"

Beat the white of five Eggs with two pounds

Of sugar, and a little citric acid.

Flavor with lemon and drop on buttered

Paper until cold

From Nannie

=== Manly meals ===
1950s cookbooks and magazines instructed women to feed their husbands food they could "sink their teeth into." Women were to avoid "sissy foods" that would insult their husband's masculinity. "Men's foods" were hearty, greasy, and spicy: sausage and corned beef hash, spaghetti with chili, stuffed cabbage, mutton chops, fried potatoes, and broiled pork chops. Recipes for men emphasized the barbecuing of meat and the use of exotic ingredients. In the Robertshaw Measured Heat Cookbook, this recipe for "Wieners Royale"—hot dogs stuffed with cheese and wrapped in bacon—gave masculine instructions for its preparation:

"But let's start with husky, meat-filled Franks—none of the puny, anemic, cereal stuffed dogs will do. With a sharp knife incise lengthwise about halfway through your Frankfurter, and press from both end to make the gaping wound grin at you...[after they are cooked] pop a sizzling Frank into the bun. Pull out toothpicks, slosh with mustard to taste, clamp both pieces of the bun together, and fling your lips over as delicious a dish as Hebe ever served on Olympus."

== List of 1950s cookbooks ==
- Modern Homemaker's Cookbook (1950) by Beth McLean
- Betty Crocker's Picture Cook Book (1950)
- Better Homes and Gardens Cook Book (1951)
- Peggy Put the Kettle On (1951) by Blanche C. Firmin
- Cooking It Ahead (1951) by Elinore Marvel
- The Man's Cookbook (1953) by Arthur H. Deute
- The Bride's Cookbook (1954) by Poppy Canon
- The Queen is in the Kitchen (1954) by Marguerite McCarthy
- Food for Men (1954) by Glenn Quilty
- Better Homes and Gardens Junior Cook Book (1955)
- Casserole Specialties (1955) by Nedda C. Anders
- Cooking With the Experts (1955) edited by William A Kaufman
- Cocktail-Supper Cookbook (1955) by Marion W. Flexner
- Cookbook for Two (1957) by Ida Bailey Allen
- Thoughts for Buffets (1958)
- Picture Cookbook (1958)
- Cook, My Darling Daughter (1959) by Mildred Knopf
- The General Mills Kitchens Cookbook (1959)
