= Carrozza (sandwich) =

Italian dish

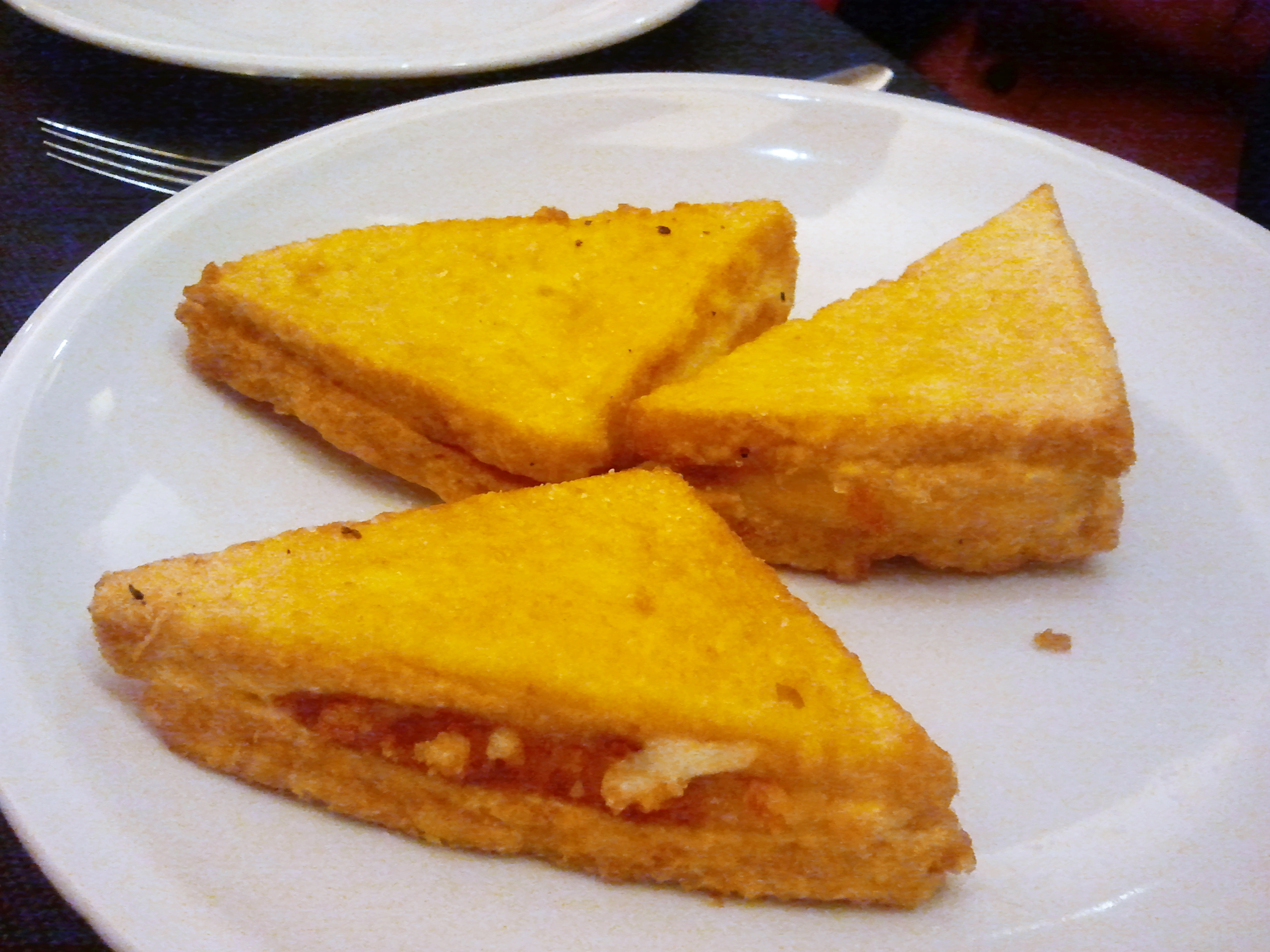
Mozzarella in carrozza

A carrozza, also referred to as mozzarella in carrozza (lit. 'mozzarella in a carriage'), is a type of fried cheese sandwich or pastry in Italian cuisine. It is prepared by coating a mozzarella cheese sandwich in egg and flour, and frying it. It is a popular dish in the Campania region of Italy and in areas of New York City. Mozzarella fritta is a variation of the dish that consists of battered cheese, without any bread.

== Preparation ==
The carrozza is prepared with mozzarella cheese, an egg wash and bread slices. It can be prepared with various breads, such as Italian bread and sandwich loaf, among others. The bread crust is sometimes removed before it is fried, and the bread can be slightly toasted before the sandwich is fried. Preparation involves assembling the sandwich, dredging it in egg wash, dipping it in flour, then pan or deep frying it. Bread crumbs are sometimes used to coat the sandwich. Olive oil is typically used for frying the carrozza. Additional ingredients are sometimes used, such as ham, anchovies, eggplant, green tomatoes and basil. After being cooked, it has a crisp or crunchy texture. It can be served as an antipasto dish.

== By region ==
The carrozza is a street food and popular dish in Campania, a region in southern Italy. Buffalo mozzarella, which is prepared using the milk from the Italian Mediterranean Buffalo, is typically used in Campania to prepare the sandwich.

It is also a popular dish in Italian-American restaurants in New York City, where it is typically deep fried.

== Variations ==
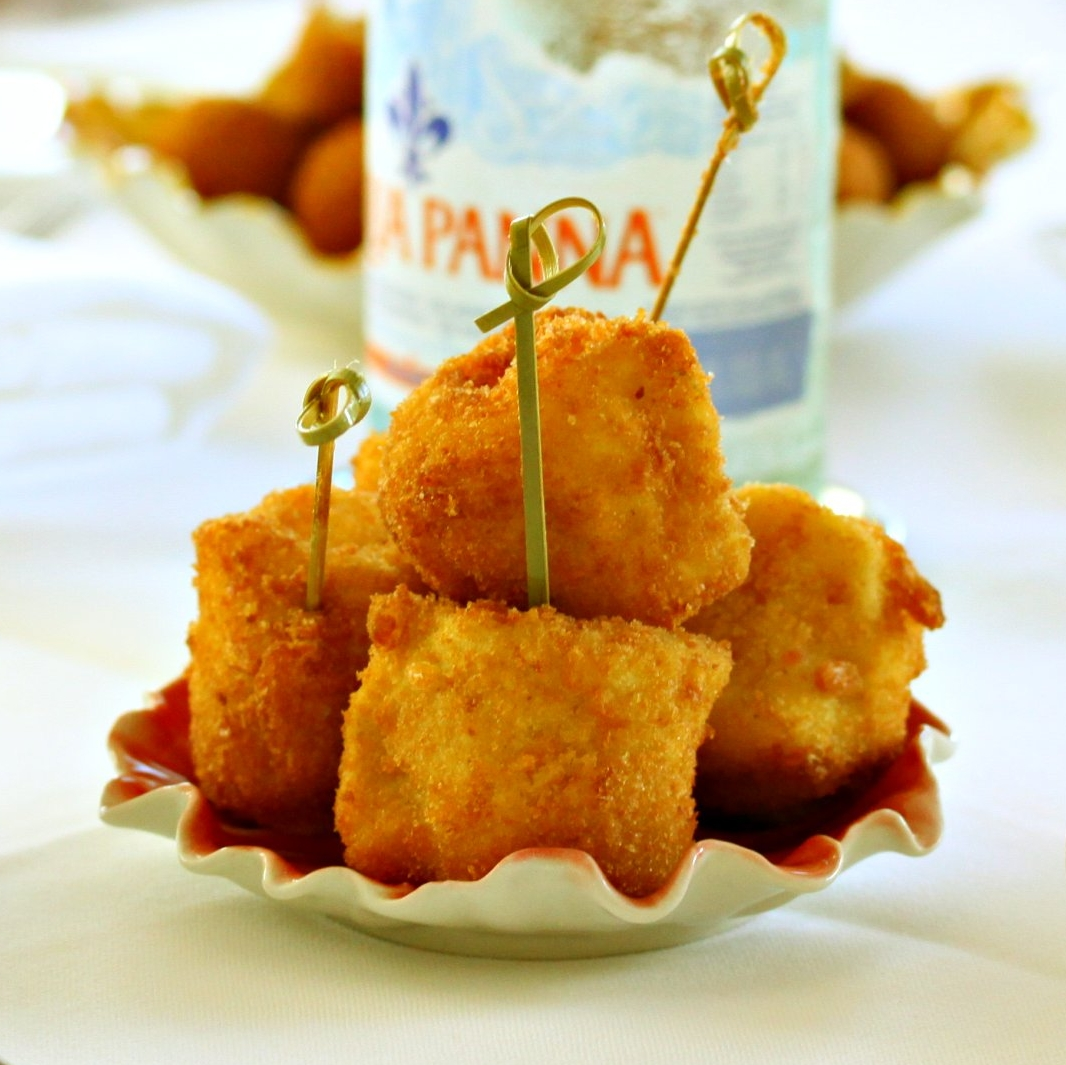
Mozzarella fritta

A variation of the carrozza is mozzarella fritta (lit. 'fried mozzarella'), which is simply the battered and fried cheese without the bread. Another version of the carrozza uses eggplant slices instead of bread.

== See also ==
- List of cheese dishes
- List of sandwiches
- List of street foods
- Toasted ravioli
