= Cheese Sandwich (My Little Pony) =

Fictional character from My Little Pony

- My Little Pony character
- Cheese Sandwich as he appears in "Pinkie Pride"
- First appearance: "Pinkie Pride" (2014)
- Created by: Amy Keating Rogers; Jayson Thiessen
- Voiced by: "Weird Al" Yankovic

In-universe information
- Species: Earth Pony
- Title: Super Duper Party Pony
- Occupation: Traveling party planner
- Spouse: Pinkie Pie (finale)
- Children: Lil' Cheese (son; finale)

Cheese Sandwich is a fictional character who appears in the fourth incarnation of Hasbro's My Little Pony toyline and media franchise, specifically in My Little Pony: Friendship Is Magic (2010–2019). He is voiced by "Weird Al" Yankovic and serves as a rival to Pinkie Pie. The character made his debut in the fourth season episode "Pinkie Pride" and later appears in the ninth season episode "The Last Laugh" and the series finale.

An energetic and eccentric anthropomorphic earth pony with a talent for party planning and entertainment that rivals Pinkie Pie's abilities, Cheese Sandwich travels across Equestria as a professional party planner, earning the title "Super Duper Party Pony."

== Appearances ==
=== Fourth My Little Pony incarnation (2010–2019) ===
==== My Little Pony: Friendship Is Magic ====
Cheese Sandwich makes his first appearance in the fourth season episode "Pinkie Pride" as a traveling party planner who arrives in Ponyville to organize a birthday party for Rainbow Dash. Pinkie Pie is threatened by his reputation as the "Super Duper Party Pony", leading to a party-planning competition between them. It is later revealed through a flashback that Cheese had been inspired to become a party pony after attending one of Pinkie's parties as a colt, where she gave him his first smile.

During the "goof off" competition, Pinkie’s elaborate party threatens to overwhelm Rainbow Dash, causing Pinkie to realize that a simpler, more personal celebration would be more appropriate. This leads to Pinkie graciously conceding and the two party ponies becoming friends. He gifts his rubber chicken, Boneless, to Pinkie as a gesture of friendship before departing Ponyville.

== Development ==
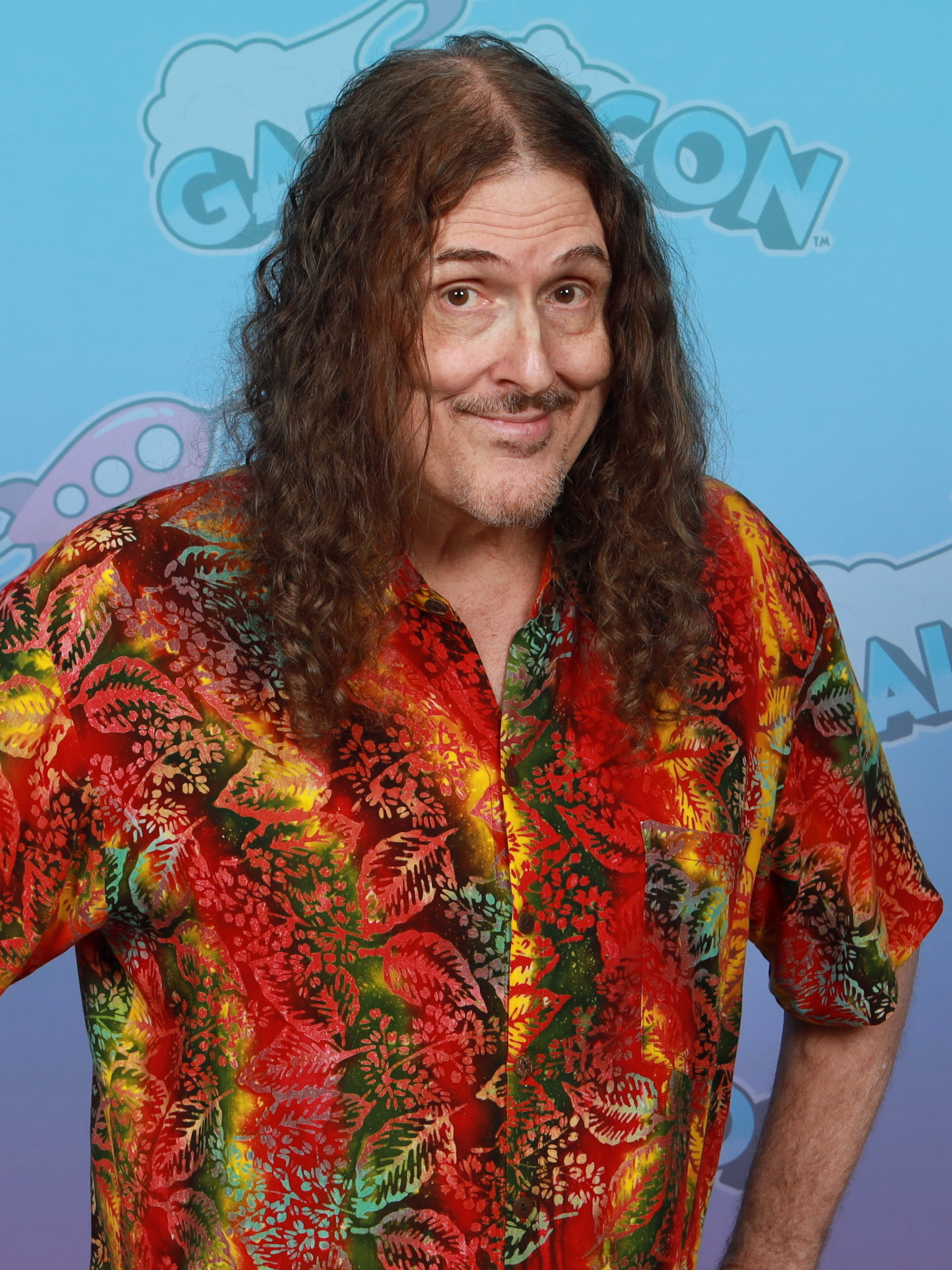
"Weird Al" Yankovic provided the voice for Cheese Sandwich.

In April 2011, Yankovic posted a Twitter link to a user-created pony music video featuring scenes from Friendship Is Magic episodes set to "Polkarama!", one of his polka medleys. Co-executive producer Jayson Thiessen discovered the tweet and asked if Yankovic would be interested in guest voicing a character—"Weird Al and My Little Pony seem to go together really well." After receiving positive fan response, Yankovic privately messaged Thiessen about a year later expressing his interest in participating. Series writer Amy Keating Rogers and Thiessen developed Cheese Sandwich as a character who could rival Pinkie Pie in the realm of party planning.

Following the positive reception of his debut episode "Pinkie Pride", Yankovic expressed enthusiasm for the role in a Reddit "Ask me Anything" session, stating that he "had a blast" performing as Cheese Sandwich and was "extremely happy" with the episode. He indicated willingness to reprise the role if asked by the showrunners. The character would later return in the season 9 episode "The Last Laugh".

== Reception and analysis ==
Author Samuel Oatley identified Cheese Sandwich as one of three male characters (along with Quibble Pants and Filthy Rich) who escape the show's typical pattern of either othering single fathers or creating symbiotic fathers who lose their individual identity within marriage. Oatley wrote that Cheese Sandwich's fatherhood is "painted as a mere facet of his personality rather than the totality of his narrative importance," arguing that because his marriage to Pinkie Pie and their child are only revealed in the series finale, his earlier appearances focus on his life as a party planner pony rather than his romantic or paternal relationships. According to Oatley, this narrative approach allows Cheese Sandwich to maintain "a stronger individual presence than many of the other Symbiotic Fathers" by establishing his character before "being pushed into fatherhood after the fact."

Author Jen A. Blue wrote that while Cheese Sandwich "appears straightforwardly to just be a regular, mirror-image foil to Pinkie Pie," his character serves a deeper function in the episode's exploration of concealment and revelation. Blue highlighted how Cheese Sandwich's concealment of his past creates a meaningful connection between the characters that transcends simple rivalry. Blue argued that Cheese Sandwich's revelation provides Pinkie Pie with an important part of her development: approval in the present for a past achievement, as she learns that one of the first parties she had even thrown had a transformative impact on someone else.

Carly Olsen of Screen Rant ranked the pairing between Cheese Sandwich and Pinkie Pie the third best pairing in the series.

== See also ==
- List of My Little Pony: Friendship Is Magic characters
- Pinkie Pie
- My Little Pony: Friendship Is Magic fandom
