= List of films based on Hasbro properties =

This is a list of films that are based on properties owned by international toy and entertainment company Hasbro. This includes films owned originally by Hasbro as well as properties the company has since acquired.

== Animated films ==
Theatrical films

- GoBots: Battle of the Rock Lords (1986)
- My Little Pony: The Movie (1986)
- The Transformers: The Movie (1986)
- G.I. Joe: The Movie (1987) (Planned for theatrical release)
- Pound Puppies and the Legend of Big Paw (1988)
- My Little Pony: The Movie (2017)
- Peppa Pig: The Golden Boots (2015) (British, theatrical)
- Peppa Pig: My First Cinema Experience (2017) (British, theatrical)
- My Little Pony: A New Generation (2021)
- Transformers One (2024)
- Peppa Pig: Perfect Holiday (2026)

Direct-to-Video

- Inhumanoids: The Movie (1986)
- G.I. Joe: Spy Troops (2003)
- G.I. Joe: Valor vs. Venom (2004)
- G.I. Joe: Ninja Battles (2004)
- Tonka Tough Truck Adventures: The Biggest Show on Wheels! (2004)
- Action Man: Robot Atak (2004)
- Weebles: Welcome to Weebleville! (2005)
- Candy Land: The Great Lollipop Adventure (2005)
- Beyblade: Fierce Battle (2005)^{1}
- Weebles: Sharing in the Fun! (2005)
- My Little Pony: A Very Minty Christmas (2005)
- Action Man: X Missions – The Movie (2005)
- My Little Pony: The Princess Promenade (2006)
- My Little Pony Crystal Princess: The Runaway Rainbow (2006)
- My Little Pony: A Very Pony Place (2007)
- My Little Pony: Twinkle Wish Adventure (2009)
- My Little Pony: Equestria Girls (2013)^{1}
- My Little Pony: Equestria Girls – Rainbow Rocks (2014)^{1}
- My Little Pony: Equestria Girls – Friendship Games (2015)^{1}

TV specials

- My Little Pony: Rescue at Midnight Castle (1984)
- My Little Pony: Escape from Catrina (1985)
- Star Fairies (1985)
- Furby Island (2005)
- Transformers Prime Beast Hunters: Predacons Rising (2013)
- My Little Pony: Equestria Girls – Legend of Everfree (2016) (also streaming)
- My Little Pony: Equestria Girls – Magical Movie Night (US) / Tales of Canterlot High (UK) (2017)
- My Little Pony: Equestria Girls – Forgotten Friendship (2018)
- My Little Pony: Equestria Girls – Rollercoaster of Friendship (2018)
- My Little Pony: Best Gift Ever (2018)
- My Little Pony: Equestria Girls – Spring Breakdown (2019)
- My Little Pony: Rainbow Roadtrip (2019)
- My Little Pony: Equestria Girls – Sunset's Backstage Pass (2019)
- My Little Pony: Equestria Girls – Holidays Unwrapped (2019)

^{1} : Limited theatrical release.

=== Animated shorts ===
Direct-to-Video

- A Charming Birthday (2003)
- Dancing in the Clouds (2004)
- Friends are Never Far Away (2005)
- Greetings from Unicornia (2006)
- Pinkie Pie and the Ladybug Jamboree (2006)
- My Little Pony: Meet the Ponies (2008)
- Waiting for the Winter Wishes Festival (2009)

Theatrical

- Hanazuki: Full of Treasures short film (2017) (Double billed with My Little Pony: The Movie (2017)
- Optimus Prime: Awakening (2026)

== Live-action films ==
=== Feature-length films ===
Title	Production by	Year
Clue	Paramount Pictures; PolyGram Filmed Entertainment	December 13, 1985
Mighty Morphin Power Rangers: The Movie	Saban Entertainment; Toei Company; 20th Century Fox	June 30, 1995
Turbo: A Power Rangers Movie	Saban Entertainment; Toei Company; 20th Century Fox	March 28, 1997
Dungeons & Dragons	New Line Cinema; Behavior Worldwide; Silver Pictures; Sweetpea Entertainment	December 8, 2000
Dungeons & Dragons: Wrath of the Dragon God	Sci Fi Pictures; Warner Home Video	October 8, 2005
Transformers	DreamWorks Pictures; Paramount Pictures; Hasbro Studios; di Bonaventura Pictures	July 3, 2007
Transformers: Revenge of the Fallen	DreamWorks Pictures; Paramount Pictures; Hasbro Studios; di Bonaventura Pictures	June 24, 2009
G.I. Joe: The Rise of Cobra	Paramount Pictures; Spyglass Entertainment; Hasbro Studios; di Bonaventura Pictures	August 7, 2009
Transformers: Dark of the Moon	Paramount Pictures; Hasbro Studios; di Bonaventura Pictures	June 29, 2011
Battleship	Universal Pictures; Hasbro Studios; Bluegrass Films; Film 44	May 18, 2012
Dungeons & Dragons 3: The Book of Vile Darkness	Zinc Entertainment Inc.	August 9, 2012
G.I. Joe: Retaliation	Paramount Pictures; Metro-Goldwyn-Mayer Pictures; Skydance Productions; Hasbro Studios; di Bonaventura Pictures	March 28, 2013
Transformers: Age of Extinction	Paramount Pictures; Hasbro Studios; di Bonaventura Pictures; China Movie Channel; Jiaflix Enterprises	June 27, 2014
Ouija	Universal Pictures; Hasbro Studios; Blumhouse Productions; Platinum Dunes	October 24, 2014
Jem and the Holograms	Universal Pictures; Allspark Pictures; Blumhouse Productions; SB Projects	October 23, 2015
Ouija: Origin of Evil	Universal Pictures; Allspark Pictures; Blumhouse Productions; Platinum Dunes	October 21, 2016
Power Rangers	SCG Films; Lionsgate; Temple Hill Entertainment	March 24, 2017
Transformers: The Last Knight	Paramount Pictures; Hasbro Studios; di Bonaventura Pictures; Huahua Media	June 21, 2017
Bumblebee	Paramount Pictures; di Bonaventura Pictures; Allspark Pictures; Tencent Pictures; Bay Films	December 21, 2018
Snake Eyes: G.I. Joe Origins	Paramount Pictures; Metro-Goldwyn-Mayer Pictures; Skydance Media; Entertainment One; di Bonaventura Pictures	July 16, 2021
Dungeons & Dragons: Honor Among Thieves	Paramount Pictures; Entertainment One; Hasbro; Sweetpea Entertainment	March 31, 2023
Transformers: Rise of the Beasts	Paramount Pictures; Skydance Media; Hasbro; di Bonaventura Pictures; New Republic Pictures; Bayhem Films	June 9, 2023

=== Live-action shorts ===
Title	Production by	Year	Note
Power Rangers: Legacy Wars - Street Fighter Showdown	Allspark Pictures; Lionsgate Games; Bat in the Sun; nWay Games; Capcom	October 11, 2018	

== See also ==
- Allspark
- Hasbro Entertainment
- List of television programs based on Hasbro properties
