= List of My Little Pony: Equestria Girls animations =

The following is a list of animated works as commissioned by Allspark Animation (a subsidiary of American toy company Hasbro; previously credited under Hasbro Studios) as a part of My Little Pony: Equestria Girls toy line and media franchise, which is a spin-off of the 2010 incarnation of Hasbro's main My Little Pony franchise.

The productions, especially films (2013–2016) and specials (2017–2019), are tie-ins to the yearly theme of Equestria Girls line-up of toys. The animations revolve around the main cast of My Little Pony: Friendship Is Magic (the main My Little Pony line's television series), normally ponies, as teenage humanoid characters in a high school setting in an alternate universe.

Most of animated media were produced by DHX Studios Vancouver's 2D animation team in Canada, with the exception of Canterlot Shorts from 2017, which were produced by Boulder Media in Ireland (a company acquired by Hasbro in 2016).

The following works were produced under this scope:

Films

- Equestria Girls (2013)
- Rainbow Rocks (2014)
- Friendship Games (2015)
- Legend of Everfree (2016)

Specials

- Magical Movie Night (2017)
  - "Dance Magic"
  - "Movie Magic"
  - "Mirror Magic"
- Forgotten Friendship (2018)
- Rollercoaster of Friendship (2018)
- Spring Breakdown (2019)
- Sunset's Backstage Pass (2019)
- Holidays Unwrapped (2019)

Shorts

- Rainbow Rocks prelude shorts (2014)
- Rainbow Rocks encore shorts and Friendship Games prelude shorts (2015)
- Canterlot Shorts (2017)
- Music videos (2017)
- Better Together shorts (2017–2020)

In the United States, the Equestria Girls animations were broadcast on television on Discovery Family (a joint venture between Discovery, Inc. and Hasbro) and/or released online on its TV Everywhere platform Discovery Family Go, and released on the physical home media by Shout! Factory. The first three films, Equestria Girls, Rainbow Rocks and Friendship Games, each had a premiere screening event held prior to the release, with the first two films additionally having limited release in select theaters. Animated shorts (and, later, certain specials) were released freely worldwide on YouTube through Hasbro's official channels, and previously on the toy line's official website.

This list does not include Equestria Girls Minis animated shorts, the production company behind which is yet to be identified; see My Little Pony: Equestria Girls#Equestria Girls Minis shorts for details about the particular shorts.

== Premise ==
As with the toy line, the animations are primarily set in a fictional world parallel to the pony-inhabited fantasy setting of the 2010 incarnation of My Little Pony, accessible via a magic mirror. The media additionally features alternate humanoid versions of pony characters in roles similar to the counterparts in Equestria; characters as depicted in the Friendship Is Magic television series who travel between worlds assume similar forms in the alternative setting.

The first film, Equestria Girls, follows Equestria's Twilight Sparkle in the parallel world, which is accessed through a magic mirror. Together, with the counterparts of her pony friends, Rainbow Dash, Pinkie Pie, Applejack, Rarity, and Fluttershy, along with her assistant Spike, Twilight confronts Sunset Shimmer, who seeks to claim the Element of Magic.

Later works put Sunset Shimmer, introduced in the first film as the main antagonist who betrayed her former teacher Princess Celestia but later reformed, in a leading role in place of Equestria's Twilight Sparkle. Friendship Games formally introduced the parallel world counterpart of Twilight Sparkle (a.k.a. "Sci-Twi"). Following the events of the first film, the main seven characters gained magical powers from the Element of Magic, giving them the ability to assume anthropomorphic half-pony forms. Using these powers, they deal with the various magical happenings in Canterlot High, which primarily come from the mirror portal.

== Productions ==
Allspark Animation (previously credited as Hasbro Studios), a subsidiary of Hasbro responsible for non-toy multimedia strategies, commissioned the productions. DHX Studios Vancouver's 2D animation team, part of Canadian company DHX Media's DHX Studios division, produced most of animations. However, the Canterlot Shorts from 2017 were produced by Boulder Media, an animation studio located in Dublin, Ireland, that Hasbro acquired in 2016.

To maintain continuity of the films with the Friendship Is Magic television series, Hasbro used the same writing staff as the show, including the story editor Meghan McCarthy, who considered the story to be "an extension of our mythology". McCarthy stated that with the Equestria Girls setting, "we might explore different aspects of relationships that in the pony world don't quite work the same as they do when you set it in a high school setting", thus making the work more appealing to older girls who are in high or junior high school.

=== Films (2013–2016) ===
Four Equestria Girls animated feature films, each lasting around 70 minutes, were released between 2013 and 2016, promoting the year's particular line-up of Equestria Girls dolls. The films were then followed by the animated specials beginning in 2017 (the year My Little Pony: The Movie, a wide release animated feature film, was distributed by Lionsgate Films).

The first two films were written by Meghan McCarthy and directed by Jayson Thiessen; the third film was written by Josh Haber and directed by Ishi Rudell; the fourth film was written by Kristine Songco and Joanna Lewis, and directed by Ishi Rudell.

Hasbro Studios listed the films as "TV specials" in the company's sales guide. However, in the United States and Canada, the first two films, Equestria Girls and Rainbow Rocks, had limited theatrical screenings in select cities before they were released on home media (by Shout! Factory for the region) and broadcast on television. In the U.S., these films were screened in Screenvision theaters, without any rating from the MPAA, while in Canada, they were shown in Cineplex theaters, with classifications from provincial film boards. There are no box office records in either area are available for the two films. Internationally, there have been theatrical releases of the films in some areas, but in most cases the films were only shown on television before (or after) it was released on home media.

Overview of feature films
No.	Title	Directed by	Written by	Produced by	Edited by	U.S. release date	Duration
1	My Little Pony: Equestria Girls	Jayson Thiessen	Meghan McCarthy	Sarah Wall; Devon Cody	Mark Kuehnel	June 16, 2013 (Note: Premiere during Los Angeles Film Festival 2013.)	73 minutes
2	My Little Pony: Equestria Girls – Rainbow Rocks	Jayson Thiessen	Meghan McCarthy	Sarah Wall; Devon Cody	Rachel Kenzie	September 27, 2014 (Note: Released in select theaters.)	73 minutes
3	My Little Pony: Equestria Girls – Friendship Games	Ishi Rudell	Josh Haber	Devon Cody	Rachel Kenzie	September 26, 2015 (Note: Television premiere on Discovery Family.)	72 minutes
4	My Little Pony: Equestria Girls – Legend of Everfree	Ishi Rudell	Kristine Songco; Joanna Lewis	Angela Belyea	Shannon Archibald; Tom Harris	October 1, 2016 (Note: Availability on Netflix in the United States.)	73 minutes

==== Equestria Girls (2013) ====
In writing the script of the first film, Equestria Girls, Meghan McCarthy went back to the self-titled two-part pilot episodes of Friendship Is Magic, where Twilight Sparkle is sent to Ponyville for the first time and forced to meet new friends. She wanted to do the same with the film, in this case putting Twilight into a new world where she would again be forced to make new friends to succeed in her quest. Released in 2013, the film was premiered on June 16 as a part of Los Angeles Film Festival that year, before having limited theatrical releases in the United States and Canada the next day, and was released on home media on August 6.

==== Rainbow Rocks (2014) ====
The second film released in 2014, Rainbow Rocks centers around Twilight Sparkle, Sunset Shimmer and friends battling the Dazzlings, a trio of evil sirens who were banished to the human world long ago. On February 13, 2014, Meghan McCarthy wrote on Twitter that she had worked on the film during the summer of 2013. That same day, songwriter Daniel Ingram also wrote on the service that there would be a total of 12 songs in the film; however, only 11 songs were used in the film. The film had a limited theatrical release from September 27, 2014, before it was out on home media on October 28 that year.

==== Friendship Games (2015) ====
Released in 2015, the third installment, Friendship Games, was first teased by Rainbow Rocks co-director, Ishi Rudell on December 12, 2014. The film was first broadcast on September 26, 2015 on Discovery Family in the U.S. and Family Channel in Canada, and was released on home media on October 13 that year. In the film, the alternative universe counterpart of Twilight Sparkle, a student at Crystal Prep, begins investigating the magical occurrences at Canterlot High. After creating a device that can store magic, Twilight is forced by Principal Abacus Cinch to disrupt Friendship Games (a sporting event held every four years with Canterlot High) with magic.

==== Legend of Everfree (2016) ====
On October 3, 2015, CEO of Hasbro Studios Stephen Davis said that a fourth film, subtitled Legend of Everfree, was in development. The film was released on Netflix on October 1, 2016, and the home media release followed on November 1, 2016. In the film, the protagonists follow the damages at Camp Everfree caused by a creature so-called Gaea Everfree.

=== Specials (2017–2019) ===
Beginning in 2017, Hasbro released Equestria Girls animated specials in place of feature films. As with the four previous films, the specials promote the year's particular line-up of Equestria Girls dolls.

The three 22-minute specials were released in 2017. The following year, 2018, Hasbro began releasing extended specials. The original version of Forgotten Friendship (the first special to be produced under the current cycle) lasts around 50 minutes, but it was cut to around 44 minutes for television broadcasts. Subsequent specials (Rollercoaster of Friendship, Spring Breakdown, Sunset's Backstage Pass, Holidays Unwrapped) were produced to fit around the length of 44 minutes.

The specials since 2018 are also released freely worldwide on YouTube, after the initial release in the United States, through Hasbro's official channels. The YouTube release of specials are divided into parts, and released sequentially every week, in line with the Better Together shorts.

Overview of animated specials
No.	Release/Title	Episode title	Directed by	Written by	Produced by	Edited by	U.S. release date	Duration
2017 specials
1	2017 specials Magical Movie Night; Tales of Canterlot High	"Dance Magic"	Ishi Rudell; Katrina Hadley	G.M. Berrow	Angela Belyea	Shannon Archibald; Tom Harris	June 24, 2017	22 minutes
1	2017 specials Magical Movie Night; Tales of Canterlot High	"Movie Magic"	Ishi Rudell; Katrina Hadley	Noelle Benevuenti	Angela Belyea	Shannon Archibald; Tom Harris	July 1, 2017	22 minutes
1	2017 specials Magical Movie Night; Tales of Canterlot High	"Mirror Magic"	Ishi Rudell; Katrina Hadley	Rachel Vine; Dave Polsky	Angela Belyea	Shannon Archibald; Tom Harris	July 8, 2017	22 minutes
Specials since 2018
2	Forgotten Friendship; Most Likely to be Forgotten	N/A	Ishi Rudell; Katrina Hadley	Nick Confalone	Angela Belyea; Colleen McAllister	Nick Confalone	February 17, 2018	50 minutes (Note: Edited to 44 minutes for television broadcasts.)
3	Rollercoaster of Friendship	N/A	Ishi Rudell; Katrina Hadley	Nick Confalone	Angela Belyea; Colleen McAllister	Nick Confalone	July 6, 2018	44 minutes
4	Spring Breakdown	N/A	Ishi Rudell; Katrina Hadley	Nick Confalone	Angela Belyea; Katherine Crownover; Colleen McAllister	Nick Confalone	March 30, 2019	44 minutes
5	Sunset's Backstage Pass	N/A	Ishi Rudell; Katrina Hadley	Whitney Ralls	Angela Belyea; Katherine Crownover; Colleen McAllister	Nick Confalone	July 27, 2019	44 minutes
6	Holidays Unwrapped	N/A	Ishi Rudell; Katrina Hadley	Anna Christopher	Angela Belyea; Katherine Crownover	Nick Confalone	November 2, 2019	44 minutes

==== 2017 specials ====
Three animated specials, each lasting around 22 minutes, were first announced in October 2016. The specials were broadcast on Discovery Family on Saturdays from June 24 to July 8, 2017, as a part of the channel's "Summer Splash" seasonal event. The first of the specials, "Dance Magic", focuses on the protagonists' attempt to enter a music video contest to win an amount of prize money, which they plan to use to help repair Camp Everfree; the second, "Movie Magic", follows the protagonists, who were invited to a film studio tour, encounter a series of incidents while the filming was taking place, and begin a group investigation; in "Mirror Magic", the last of the specials, Sunset Shimmer takes Starlight Glimmer to a tour of the parallel universe, and a mirror corrupted by Equestrian magic slowly influences a girl.

==== Forgotten Friendship (2018) ====
Forgotten Friendship (a.k.a. Most Likely to be Forgotten), which succeeded the 2017 specials, was broadcast on February 17, 2018, on Discovery Family. The story follows Sunset Shimmer's discovery that her friends' memories of her have been mysteriously erased; she returns to Equestria and seeks help from Twilight Sparkle to find the real cause before the memories vanish forever.

==== Rollercoaster of Friendship (2018) ====
Rollercoaster of Friendship was broadcast on July 6, 2018, on Discovery Family as a part of its "Summer Surprises" seasonal event. The story follows Rarity's acceptance of a summer job as a costume designer for a new amusement park and the strain that it puts on her friendship with the other girls, particularly Applejack.

==== Spring Breakdown (2019) ====
Spring Breakdown was broadcast on Discovery Family on March 30, 2019. In this special, the girls take a luxury cruise for spring break, but wayward magic imperils the passengers and forces Sunset Shimmer, and the parallel universe counterpart of Twilight Sparkle and Rainbow Dash to visit Equestria for help from Ponyville's Twilight Sparkle.

==== Sunset's Backstage Pass (2019) ====
Sunset's Backstage Pass was broadcast on Discovery Family on July 27, 2019. It follows Sunset Shimmer as she attends a music festival along with other protagonists but finds herself stuck in a time loop.

==== Holidays Unwrapped (2019) ====
Holidays Unwrapped, a holiday season special, was broadcast on Discovery Family on November 2, 2019. Presented in an omnibus manner, the special follows the protagonists who prepare for, and enjoy, the parallel universe's equivalent of Christmas and holiday season.

=== Shorts (2014–2015; 2017–2020) ===
Overview of animated shorts
No.	Release	Portion(s)	Directed by	Year(s)	No. of episodes
Feature film complementary shorts (2014–2015)
1	2014 shorts	Rainbow Rocks prelude shorts	Ishi Rudell	2014	8
2	2015 shorts	Rainbow Rocks encore shorts	Ishi Rudell	2015	3
2	2015 shorts	Friendship Games prelude shorts	Jayson Thiessen	2015	5
Summer 2017 shorts
3	Canterlot Shorts	N/A	N/A	2017	10
4	Music videos	N/A	N/A	2017	6
Better Together shorts (2017–2020)
5	Better Together season 1	Normal shorts	Ishi Rudell	2017–2018	27
5	Better Together season 1	Interactive shorts	Ishi Rudell	2017–2018	10
6	Better Together season 2	Normal shorts	Ishi Rudell; Katrina Hadley	2019–2020	24
6	Better Together season 2	Interactive shorts	Ishi Rudell	2019–2020	9

==== Rainbow Rocks and Friendship Games complementary shorts (2014–2015) ====
Feature films Rainbow Rocks and Friendship Games are each accompanied by a series of animated shorts released online. 8 animated shorts which served as a prelude to Rainbow Rocks were released in 2014, followed by 3 encore shorts to Rainbow Rocks and 5 prelude shorts to Friendship Games (in total, 8 animated shorts) in 2015. The shorts are also included in physical home media releases of the films as a part of special features.

==== Summertime Shorts (2017) ====
===== Canterlot Shorts (2017) =====
The Canterlot Shorts (as referred by Hasbro, even though the title card for this series has nothing but an Equestria Girls logo) was premiered on July 30, 2017, on Discovery Family (where it is billed together with the music videos as Summertime Shorts) as a part of the channel's "Summer Splash" seasonal event. The series is the only animated media in the Equestria Girls franchise to be produced by Boulder Media in the Ireland (which Hasbro Studios acquired in 2016), and all episodes were written by Gillian M. Berrow (who also wrote the novelization of first Equestria Girls film as well as most of the Friendship Is Magic novels). The shorts were later released internationally on YouTube by Hasbro through its official channel.

Title	Writer	Original airdate
"Make Up Shake Up"	Mason Rather	July 30, 2017
While getting ready for the CHS Fall Formal, Applejack reluctantly agrees to let Rarity do her makeup. The end result is so garishly overdone that she persuades Rarity to take it off a little at a time until she is back to her normal appearance.
"A Photo Booth Story"	Gillian M. Berrow	July 30, 2017
At the CHS Fall Formal, the girls have their picture taken by Photo Finish, who insists that they use silly costumes and props to liven up the shoot. They have fun goofing around until Rarity's new pixie wings catch fire under the lights, and Photo declares that the shoot is her best work ever.
"Raise This Roof"	Gillian M. Berrow	July 30, 2017
At the CHS Fall Formal, Applejack hears her favorite song being played and has Apple Bloom do a line dance with her. Seeing a chance for a dance-off, Rainbow Dash has a hip-hop track put on and starts breakdancing with Scootaloo. The challenge shifts back and forth, with the two younger girls being pushed to the sidelines as the older ones' enthusiasm gets the better of them. Apple Bloom and Scootaloo show them both up by doing a funky dance of their own, for which Pinkie Pie awards them a trophy. Applejack and Rainbow Dash gracefully accept defeat, but the latter still asks the girls for a rematch.
"Steps of Pep"	Gillian M. Berrow	July 30, 2017
Pinkie Pie recruits Fluttershy to join the CHS cheering club and tries to get her to raise her soft voice as they cheer on the soccer team. They move on to root for a vocal quartet and then a chess match, to which Fluttershy's quietness is perfectly suited.
"Pet Project"	Gillian M. Berrow	August 5, 2017
After visiting Fluttershy at her job in a pet grooming salon, Sunset Shimmer decides to get a pet of her own so she can take part in a photo shoot with the other girls' pets (including Pinkie Pie's stuffed alligator doll Gummy). Fluttershy shows her around an animal shelter, and she adopts a tiny yellow gecko and names it Ray, returning just in time for the photo shoot.
"Subs Rock"	Gillian M. Berrow	August 5, 2017
Principal Celestia decides to fill in as substitute teacher for Twilight and Rarity's class. However, she is constantly interrupted by situations that include a cafeteria emergency and Rainbow Dash kicking a soccer ball against the outer wall of the building. By the time she takes care of all the problems, she is exhausted and the class ends.
"The Art of Friendship"	Gillian M. Berrow	August 12, 2017
Struggling to pick an idea for her painting in art class, Pinkie Pie takes Sunset Shimmer's suggestion to "get the creative juices flowing". She drinks some juice in the cafeteria, dresses up as a bird to watch and annoy the ones in her neighborhood and then plays a drum solo that ends with her pounding on a bucket in the art classroom, driving everyone to distraction. When Sunset explains that she likes to paint things that make her happy, Pinkie acts on that idea and sloshes paint all over herself and the other students' projects, resulting in her quickly turning out a simple portrait of Sunset.
"The Canterlot Movie Club"	Gillian M. Berrow	August 20, 2017
Apple Bloom, Scootaloo and Sweetie Belle are about to watch the new Daring Do movie when Pinkie Pie asks them for help in finding her stuffed alligator Gummy. Seeing a chance for adventure, the girls search the movie theater lobby and the trash cans behind the building, to which they then spot Gummy as one of the prizes inside a claw game. Scootaloo plays the game and successfully extracts Gummy, and the girls give the doll back to Pinkie just in time for the start of the movie.
"Leaping Off the Page"	Gillian M. Berrow	August 27, 2017
Rainbow Dash settles in to read one of her Daring Do novels and imagines herself as the protagonist. She flees through the jungle from a rival whose voice consists only of car honks, then encounters a bird whose call is a cell phone's ringtone. As the statue she is standing on crumbles under her feet, she snaps back to reality – now sitting on top of her wardrobe – as Twilight Sparkle and Rarity arrive in her bedroom. She was so engrossed in the story that she ignored both the honking of Applejack's horn and the ringing of her own phone before climbing onto the wardrobe. Rainbow climbs down, tosses the book aside, and leaves to join the girls to see a movie.
"Epic Fails"	Gillian M. Berrow	August 27, 2017
While the girls are eating lunch, Rarity shows them a gossip magazine that contains pictures of Countess Coloratura suffering an embarrassing fall during yoga class. They privately reflect on their own humiliating moments: an experiment blowing up and coating Twilight Sparkle and Spike in sludge, Applejack and Pinkie Pie accidentally burning a batch of pies and inadvertently setting off the smoke detector and sprinklers, Rainbow Dash knocking out a display at a sporting-goods store with a botched soccer kick, Fluttershy getting a bizarre hairdo from a flock of birds and Rarity and Sunset Shimmer both embarrassing themselves in front of a boy over a piece of lettuce stuck in Rarity's teeth. As the girls leave the cafeteria, they slip on a patch of wet floor and fall in a heap in full view of the other students, but they laugh off the fumble.

===== Music videos (2017) =====
A series of music videos was premiered on July 30, 2017, on Discovery Family (where it is billed together with the Canterlot Shorts as Summertime Shorts) as a part of the channel's "Summer Splash" seasonal event. The shorts share the same title sequence as the 2017 television specials. The shorts were later released internationally on YouTube by Hasbro through its official channel.

Title	Writer	Original airdate
"Mad Twience"	John Boyd	July 30, 2017
In a take-off of Frankenstein, Twilight Sparkle works on a secret project in her home laboratory during a stormy night with help from Spike. After a long session of poring over notes and schematics, debugging computer code and assembling hardware, she unveils the end result – a robotic puppy friend for Spike to play with.
"Monday Blues"	John Boyd	August 4, 2017
Monday morning starts very differently for Sunset Shimmer and Twilight Sparkle, with Sunset oversleeping and Twilight quickly getting ready. A storm hits as soon as they leave their homes to go to school, and both encounter various frustrations and obstacles along the way. When they arrive at Canterlot High, they find that the rest of their friends have had their own troubles in getting to school. The girls share a laugh over their misfortunes, and Pinkie Pie takes a selfie of the group with her smartphone.
"Shake Things Up!"	Mason Rather	August 11, 2017
Working at her part-time job at a juice bar in the Canterlot Mall, Applejack is bored and tired of making the same drinks every day. While slicing apples, she comes across a beet and decides to get creative with her drinks, mixing up new combinations of fruits and vegetables. Her flashy drink-mixing skills slowly draw in a crowd of customers who enjoy the new products.
"Get the Show on the Road"	Bill Sherman & Chris Jackson (song only)	August 27, 2017
The Rainbooms are about to go on tour, but the bus Applejack finds for them to use is a broken-down wreck. With Twilight Sparkle's planning and the help of their powers, they repair and repaint it in short order.
"Coinky-Dink World"	Mason Rather	September 22, 2017 (Note: Released on the Discovery Family Go! TV Everywhere platform.)
Pinkie Pie works as a waitress in a 1950s diner and attempts to play matchmaker to two nerdy patrons.
"Good Vibes"	Daniel Ingram	September 22, 2017
A glum Flash Sentry helps Trixie carry a load of props through the Canterlot Mall, setting off a domino effect of good deeds that improves a bad day for the Equestria Girls and some of their friends. The effect comes full circle when Sunset Shimmer gives Flash her order of take-out sushi to cheer him up.

==== Better Together shorts (2017–2020) ====
A plan to release a series of Equestria Girls animated shorts online sometime in 2018 was first mentioned at Hasbro's 2017 Investor Day event held in August that year. The plan was apparently brought forward, as the series (not to be confused with the Canterlot Shorts and the summer 2017 music videos that were released earlier in the same year), also known as Better Together shorts, was released on Discovery Family Go TV Everywhere platform in the United States in early November 2017, before having a worldwide debut on YouTube later in the same month. On YouTube, the shorts were released by Hasbro's official channel, before moving to My Little Pony's official channel.

As well as normal animated shorts, each season also includes a number of interactive shorts (initially labelled as "Choose Your Own Ending", before re-labelled as "You Choose the Ending") which utilize the interactivity function of Discovery Family Go platform (and previously that of YouTube, before such function was disabled for child-oriented videos in January 2020). In the shorts, viewers are offered three choices, each containing a different ending, at the end of the main video. Each ending can be watched by clicking (or tapping) a button onscreen. The endings do not affect the series' entire continuity, however.

== Home media releases ==
Title	Region 1 Release Date	Episodes	Additional Features
My Little Pony: Equestria Girls	August 6, 2013	Feature film	Through the Mirror of Equestria Girls; Karaoke Songs ("Cafeteria Song" and "A Friend for Life"); Pony-fy Yourself; Printable movie poster
Equestria Girls: Rainbow Rocks	October 28, 2014	Feature film	New featurette; Prelude shorts; Sing-alongs (Better Than Ever, Battle, and Rainbooms Battle) (Note: Instrumental is credited in the Bonus menu of both the DVDs and Blu-rays of the film; but the last section from "Welcome to the Show" is played, starting with Sunset's verse.); Audio commentary by Meghan McCarthy, Jayson Thiessen, Ishi Rudell, Michael Vogel, and Brian Lenard
Equestria Girls: Friendship Games	October 13, 2015	Feature film	Deleted scenes; Audio commentary; Sing-alongs; Animated shorts
Equestria Girls (Three Movie Gift Set)	October 13, 2015	Box set: Equestria Girls; Equestria Girls: Rainbow Rocks; Equestria Girls: Friendship Games	Lenticular Cover with Transforming Twilight Sparkle; Bonus features; Audio commentary on Rainbow Rocks and Friendship Games; Prelude shorts for Rainbow Rocks; Animated shorts for Friendship Games; Deleted scenes from Friendship Games; Sing-alongs
Equestria Girls: Legend of Everfree	November 1, 2016	Feature film	Audio commentary; Blooper reel; Sing-alongs
My Little Pony: Equestria Girls – Magical Movie Night	August 8, 2017	Specials: Equestria Girls: Dance Magic; Equestria Girls: Movie Magic; Equestria Girls: Mirror Magic	Sing Alongs
