= My Little Pony: Equestria Girls – Holidays Unwrapped =

2019 animated television special

- Title card
- Genre: Fantasy; Comedy; Magical girl
- Written by: Anna Christopher
- Directed by: Ishi Rudell; Katrina Hadley
- Starring: Rebecca Shoichet; Tara Strong; Ashleigh Ball; Andrea Libman; Tabitha St. Germain
- Composers: Matthew Sorensen; William Kevin Anderson
- Countries of origin: United States; Canada
- Original language: English

Production
- Executive producers: Stephen Davis; Meghan McCarthy; Kirsten Newlands; Sarah Wall
- Producers: Angela Belyea; Katherine Crownover
- Editor: Nick Confalone
- Running time: 44 minutes
- Production companies: DHX Media; Allspark Animation

Original release
- Network: Discovery Family
- Release: November 2, 2019

My Little Pony: Equestria Girls – Holidays Unwrapped is a 2019 animated holiday television special within Hasbro's My Little Pony: Equestria Girls franchise, itself a spin-off of the 2010 relaunch of the My Little Pony toy line. The special was directed by Ishi Rudell and Katrina Hadley, written by Anna Christopher, and produced by DHX Media Vancouver for Allspark Animation in the United States. Unlike the previous four one-hour specials, Holidays Unwrapped is a compilation of six seven-minute shorts instead of a single hour-long story, although story editor Nick Confalone had pitched a singular narrative exploring Sunset Shimmer's backstory.

Premiered on Discovery Family (a joint venture between Discovery, Inc. and Hasbro) on November 2, 2019, it is the fifth and final one-hour Equestria Girls special, following 2018's Forgotten Friendship and Rollercoaster of Friendship, and 2019's Spring Breakdown and Sunset's Backstage Pass. It is also the last piece of Equestria Girls content produced by DHX Media.

== Plot ==
=== Blizzard or Bust ===
At Twilight Sparkle's house, the seven friends wake up after spending the previous night studying for a school test. Despite their all-night study session, they are sleep-deprived and under-prepared for their test. After seeing light snowfall outside, Rainbow Dash comes up with the idea of making a fake snow day to get Principal Celestia to cancel school.

In the montage that follows, the girls set up a fake snow day display outside Canterlot High School. Pinkie Pie makes a snowman out of potatoes; Sunset Shimmer paints a large portrait of the school courtyard covered in snow; Fluttershy directs her animal friends to make snow from ice blocks delivered by Applejack, which Twilight then spreads across the courtyard; and Rarity spends the whole time knitting a scarf for Pinkie's potato snowman.

Principal Celestia and Vice Principal Luna see the result of the girls' work outside Celestia's office window. Before Celestia cancels school for the day, however, Cranky Doodle sees through the ruse, and the girls are caught and punished with detention after their test. It is revealed that Rainbow Dash's snow day project was actually a way to prepare her and her friends for their test on water vapor.

=== Saving Pinkie's Pie ===
At Pinkie Pie's house, Pinkie is baking a soufflé for Rarity. She explains to Sunset Shimmer that she bakes a soufflé for Rarity every year, but it always deflates before she can deliver it. This year, Pinkie plans out the perfect route to deliver the soufflé to Rarity's house within seven minutes, but she and Sunset discover a huge snowball fight taking place in the front yard.

Sunset and Pinkie attempt to break through the war-like battlefield, even trying to call a ceasefire, but the two sides refuse to stop hurling snowballs. After briefly incapacitating Applejack, Sunset recruits Flash Sentry's help in getting Pinkie across the yard, but Flash is quickly taken out. Sunset eventually sacrifices herself so that Pinkie can make it the rest of the way, but seven minutes pass, and Pinkie fears she will once again fail to deliver her soufflé in time.

Just then, Rarity unexpectedly appears, and Pinkie quickly gives her the soufflé before it deflates. Rarity finds the soufflé absolutely delicious, and Pinkie is happy that she has finally succeeded in delivering her gift. When Rainbow Dash pops out of a snowman and tries to hit Pinkie and Rarity with snowballs, Rarity shields them with her magical geode powers.

=== The Cider Louse Fools ===
Twilight Sparkle has been invited to attend the Apple family's annual holiday harvest and cider-making party at their house. Applejack mentions to Twilight that Flim and Flam swindle her and her family at the party every year. The Apples intend to out-swindle the Flim Flam brothers this year by setting traps for them, and Twilight offers to help.

Through Twilight's instruction, the Apple family sets up for their cider-making party and plans to sell Flim and Flam a jug of salt-and-pepper water instead of their signature apple cider. As the party gets underway, Flim and Flam arrive and, promising to have no tricks up their sleeves this year, offer to trade some of the Apple family's cider with a fake diamond. Once the trade is fulfilled, Flim and Flam drive off, and Twilight and her friends believe they have successfully swindled the brothers.

However, Flim and Flam, having seen through their deception, reappear and make off with the cider that Twilight and her friends had hidden away. Applejack and her family believe Flim and Flam have swindled them yet again, but Twilight reveals she predicted that the brothers would see through their deception. She set up cardboard standees of party guests and made Flim and Flam believe the party started earlier than usual, causing them to make off with salt-and-pepper water as originally planned. With their deception successful, Twilight and the Apples celebrate over cider.

=== Winter Break-In ===
Sunset Shimmer's friends go to her storage locker to retrieve bags of toys to give out to kids at the Toys for Kids Festival. After a brief period of figuring out who has the storage locker key, Sunset realizes she left it in her locker at school, which is closed for winter break. In front of the school, some of the girls come up with heist ideas to break into the school and retrieve the key.

Sunset comes up with an idea of sneaking in through the air vents, disabling the security system, and distracting the janitor before getting the key. Pinkie Pie comes up with the idea of luring Principal Celestia outside with a plate of cupcakes and sneaking into the school while she is distracted. Applejack comes up with the idea of using her super strength to lift the building off its foundations.

Twilight disapproves of all these ideas that amount to breaking and entering, and she comes up with the far simpler idea of calling Celestia's phone and asking her to open the school doors for Twilight and her friends. Once they have the key to Sunset's storage locker, they deliver the toys to the Toys for Kids Festival at the Canterlot Mall. Afterward, Sunset suggests they cash in their gift cards and go shopping. Twilight realizes she left the gift cards at school, but she has another idea for a heist.

=== Dashing Through the Mall ===
At the Canterlot Mall, the seven friends get together for a Secret Santa-like holiday gift exchange, but Rainbow Dash has forgotten to get a gift for Fluttershy. She races through the mall to find a last-minute present, but nearly every store has a long line of people waiting to shop. Luckily, Zephyr Breeze works at one of the stores, and he allows Rainbow Dash to cut to the front of the wait line. Rainbow decides to put up with Zephyr's obnoxiousness to get the perfect gift for Fluttershy.

Zephyr shows Rainbow a multitude of items, none of which Rainbow considers to be suitable for Fluttershy's tastes. He eventually suggests an instant camera to replace Fluttershy's camera that broke the previous year. Rainbow Dash approves of the camera, buys it from Zephyr, and thanks him for his help.

Upon returning to her friends, Rainbow Dash gives Fluttershy the instant camera only to discover that Zephyr has already replaced the broken one. Fluttershy still enjoys the gift and quickly puts it to use, taking pictures of herself and the others as they exchange gifts. Meanwhile, Snips and Snails are overjoyed to find that they have bought extendable high-five arms for one another.

=== O' Come All Ye Squashful ===
At Canterlot High, Applejack meets with her friends and suggests starting a new holiday tradition. She explains her family takes a theme photo every year to send to their friends, and she suggests she and her friends do the same with a "cornucopia" theme. Despite her friends' reluctance over the possibility of publicly embarrassing themselves, they agree to do it for Applejack's sake, and Rarity offers to design the girls' wardrobe.

Rarity spends the day fashioning elaborate fruit/vegetable costumes for herself and her friends. They try to reach the auditorium for the photo session without being noticed, but when the bell rings to mark the end of class, students emerge from the classrooms and immediately start laughing at the girls. Once they reach the auditorium, Applejack laughs at them as well and says that she only meant to use the cornucopia as a backdrop for a group photo with everyone in their regular clothes. Annoyed that they publicly embarrassed themselves for nothing, the girls dress Applejack up in a costume just like theirs, and Photo Finish takes the picture as the girls wish the viewer a Happy Holiday.

== Cast ==
- Rebecca Shoichet as Sunset Shimmer
- Tara Strong as Twilight Sparkle
- Ashleigh Ball as Rainbow Dash and Applejack
- Andrea Libman as Pinkie Pie and Fluttershy
- Tabitha St. Germain as Rarity, Granny Smith, Photo Finish, and Vice Principal Luna
- Nicole Oliver as Principal Celestia
- Michelle Creber as Apple Bloom
- Sam Vincent as Flim
- Scott McNeil as Flam
- Kathleen Barr as Trixie Lulamoon
- Ryan Beil as Zephyr Breeze
- Vincent Tong as Flash Sentry
- Richard Newman as Mr. Cranky Doodle
- Lee Tockar as Snips
- Richard Ian Cox as Snails
- Michael Dobson as Bulk Biceps

== Release ==
Holidays Unwrapped aired on November 2, 2019 on Discovery Family (a joint venture between Discovery, Inc. and Hasbro). On YouTube, My Little Pony's official channel has uploaded the special in six parts. Its first episode was uploaded on November 16, 2019 and its last episode on December 20.
