= My Little Pony: Rainbow Roadtrip =

- Title card
- Also known as: Rainbow Road Trip
- Genre: Fantasy
- Created by: Hasbro
- Based on: My Little Pony: Friendship Is Magic by Lauren Faust; My Little Pony by Bonnie Zacherle
- Written by: Kim Beyer-Johnson
- Directed by: Gillian Comerford
- Voices of: Tara Strong; Ashleigh Ball; Andrea Libman; Tabitha St. Germain; Ian Hanlin; Kelly Metzger
- Composers: William Anderson (score); Daniel Ingram (songs)
- Countries of origin: Ireland; United States
- Original language: English

Production
- Executive producers: Stephen Davis; Nicole Dubuc; Meghan McCarthy
- Producers: Eliza Hart; Peter Lewis; Therese Trujillo; Leslie Wishnevski
- Editors: Kevin O'Brien; Kimberly Cassano; Bradford Keatts; Nick Lennox; Aoife Maguire; Robbie O'Farrell; Priane Valerie Valoria
- Running time: 60 minutes
- Production companies: Boulder Media Limited; Allspark Animation

Original release
- Network: Discovery Family
- Release: June 29, 2019

My Little Pony: Rainbow Roadtrip is a 2019 one-hour television special based on the animated television series My Little Pony: Friendship Is Magic. Unlike Friendship Is Magic, it was not produced by DHX Studios Vancouver, instead by Boulder Media Limited in Ireland, and featured the same redesigned art style which was used in the 2017 theatrical film.

The special aired on Discovery Family on June 29, 2019.

== Plot ==
Rainbow Dash receives an invitation to be the guest of honor at the Rainbow Festival in Hope Hollow. She and her friends set out by hot air balloon, but collide with a rainbow billboard on near Hope Hollow. The billboard and balloon are damaged, but the ponies are unhurt. Petunia Petals puts them up at the hotel she runs.

The next morning, the friends find the town and residents totally devoid of color. The mayor, Sunny Skies, takes them on a tour. The Festival events are meager or nonexistent, and the mayor admits apathy has taken hold. Sunny's grandfather had set up the Festival and built a Rainbow Generator to fill the sky with color. When Sunny became mayor, the generator malfunctioned and drained all the color from the town, so Twilight and her friends agree to help him.

The Hoofingtons are bakers whose products suffer because without color, they cannot tell ripe from unripe fruit. Their neighbor Moody Root grows apricots, and once Fluttershy and Pinkie Pie encourage them to start talking, Moody agrees to give the Hoofingtons part of his crop in exchange for some pies. Applejack works with mechanic Torque Wrench to fix the billboard. Rainbow Dash mentors local youngsters Barley and Pickle Barrel in stunt flying, and Rarity collaborates with fashion designer Kerfuffle on designs for the Festival. As Twilight and her friends encourage the ponies, spots of color begin to manifest around town.

Twilight investigates how to bring color back. Torque repairs the generator, but it still fails to reverse the color loss. Twilight realizes that the generator was not at fault and the fading of the town's hopeful spirit had caused the colors to start disappearing even before the generator broke down. By working to revive the Festival, she and her friends have been bringing back that hope.

The Festival begins anew, with the Hoofingtons' pies, Kerfuffle's accessories, and Rainbow Dash leading Barley and Pickle in an airshow. In front of a cheering crowd, Petunia accepts Sunny's proposal of marriage. Community spirit and color return to Hope Hollow, and Twilight and her friends return to Ponyville with the town's gratitude.

== Voice cast ==
- Tara Strong as Twilight Sparkle
  - Rebecca Shoichet as Twilight Sparkle (singing voice)
- Ashleigh Ball as Rainbow Dash and Applejack
- Andrea Libman as Pinkie Pie and Fluttershy
  - Shannon Chan-Kent as Pinkie Pie (singing voice)
- Tabitha St. Germain as Rarity
  - Kazumi Evans as Rarity (singing voice)
- Cathy Weseluck as Spike
- Ian Hanlin as Mayor Sunny Skies
- Kelly Metzger as Petunia Petals
- Rhona Rees as Torque Wrench
- Terry Klassen as Moody Root
- Racquel Belmonte as Kerfuffle
- Michael Daingerfield as Mr. Hoofington
- Veena Sood as Mrs. Hoofington
- Sabrina Pitre as Barley Barrel
- David A. Kaye as Pickle Barrel

== Merchandise ==
A toyline collection pack tie-in, titled "Rainbow Tail Surprise", was announced at the 2019 Toy Fair in New York. This pack was made available in the third quarter of 2019.

Multiple books based on the special were released, including a "Passport to Reading" Level 2 My Little Pony: Road Trip Event reader on June 25, 2019. In the United Kingdom, My Little Pony Annual 2020 is set for an August 8 release and My Little Pony: Essential Handbook: A Magical Guide for Everypony on September 5.

== Release ==
Rainbow Roadtrip received a private screening at the Odeon Cinema theater on May 23, 2019 and premiered on June 29, 2019 on Discovery Family. A release on Netflix was also announced but never occurred. On February 7, 2025, the special was uploaded by a official My Little Pony channel on YouTube.
