= Rebecca Shoichet =

Canadian voice actress

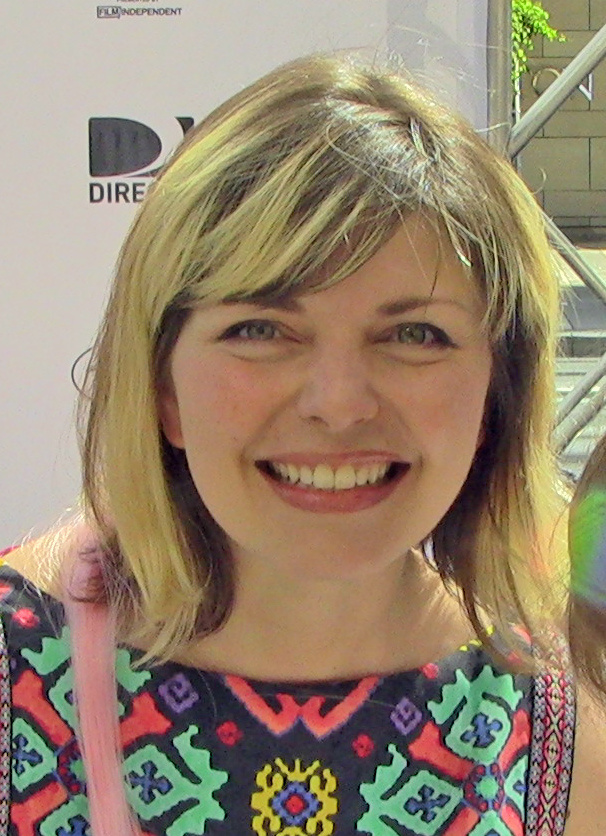
- Shoichet at the premiere of My Little Pony: Equestria Girls in 2013
- Occupation: Voice actress
- Years active: 1991–present
- Spouse: Randall Stoll (m. 2002)
- Children: 2

Rebecca Shoichet (/ʃɔɪkɛt/ shoy-ket) is a Canadian voice actress who has voiced in English dubs of Japanese anime and other shows for Ocean Productions in Vancouver, having moved there from Victoria in 2000. She took over Saffron Henderson's role of Sota Higurashi in Inuyasha after Henderson had moved to Los Angeles to do anime dubbing work in the United States. Other major roles include Mayura Labatt in Mobile Suit Gundam Seed and Nana Osaki in Nana. In animation, she voices Sunset Shimmer and sings for her and Twilight Sparkle in the My Little Pony: Friendship Is Magic series. Outside of voice acting, she has sung in the local bands Mimosa, Side One and Soulstream. She is also active in the theater productions at Vancouver Playhouse.

Shoichet also serves as a part-time instructor at the On the Mic Training voice-over training school in Vancouver.

== Filmography ==
=== Anime ===
List of dubbing performances in anime
Year	Title	Role	Notes	Source
2002–2004	Inuyasha	Sota Higurashi, Eri, Enju, Sōten, Jippō, Lady of the Infant's castle		CA
2003	Boys Over Flowers	Shigeru Okawahara		
2004	Mobile Suit Gundam SEED	Mayura Labatt		CA
2004	Hamtaro	Prince Bo	Original video animation	CA
2004	Popotan	Nurse, School Girl B		CA
2005	Star Ocean EX	Yuki		CA
2005	Tokyo Underground	Chelsea Rorec		CA
2005	Hikaru no Go	Yuri Hidaka, teacher		CA
2005	Starship Operators	Minase Shinohara, Dita Markov		CA
2006	Elemental Gelade	Rasati		CA
2006	Powerpuff Girls Z	Annie, Sedusa, Ken's mother		
2006	Shakugan no Shana	Rinne		CA
2006	.hack//Roots	Saburo		CA
2007	Ayakashi: Samurai Horror Tales	Osode Yotsuya, Jirokichi		CA
2008	Galaxy Angel X	Bomb, Reiko, Toshio's mother		CA
2009	Nana	Nana Osaki		
2014	Little Battlers Experience	Eeny		
2016	Beyblade Burst	Akio		
2017	Beyblade Burst Evolution	Clio Delon		

=== Animation ===
List of voice performances in animation
Year	Title	Role	Notes	Source
2007	Fantastic Four: World's Greatest Heroes	She-Hulk, Squirrel Girl	Episode: "The Cure"	Tweet
2008–2011	Kid vs. Kat	Lorne, Dr. K		
2009	Astonishing X-Men	Agent Brand		
2010–2019	My Little Pony: Friendship Is Magic	Sunset Shimmer, Twilight Sparkle (singing voice), Night Glider, Sugar Belle	Featured singer (Note: For My Little Pony cartoons released in the 2000s and 2010s, Shoichet is credited under Featured singers for Twilight Sparkle, and under Featured Voice Performers for Sunset Shimmer, Sugar Belle and other characters)	
2012	The New Adventures of Peter Pan	Mrs. Darling		
2012–2017	Maya the Bee	Willy, Princess Natalie and Zoot		
2014	Sabrina: Secrets of a Teenage Witch	Spella	Episode: "Spella"	
2014	Littlest Pet Shop	Featured Singer	4 episodes	
2015–2017	Bob the Builder	Mila (US) and Betsy (US)		
2015	Strawberry Shortcake's Berry Bitty Adventures	Apple Dumplin', Berrykin #2, Berrykin Tester #2, Rabbit, Postal Bee		
2015–2019	Supernoobs	XR4Ti, Mrs. Chihatte, Waitress, Toy Puppy Button Doki, Ms.Roachmont, Emma #2, The Operatior, Cheerleader		
2016	Da Jammies	Lady Lark	2 episodes	
2016	Beat Bugs	Connie		
2017	Tarzan and Jane	Jane	Netflix series	
2017	My Little Pony Equestria Girls television specials	Sunset Shimmer, Twilight Sparkle (singing voice)	Featured singer	
2017	My Little Pony: Equestria Girls web series	Sunset Shimmer, Twilight Sparkle (singing voice), Customer, Band Member, Security Guard		
2017	My Little Pony: Equestria Girls Canterlot shorts	Sunset Shimmer		
2017	Chuck's Choice	Lady, Girl #1, Cheerleaders, Ashley, Ms. McFarlane, Girl Student	4 episodes	
2017	Super Monsters	Molasses the Sloth		
2017–present	Enchantimals	Sage Skunk, Caper Skunk, Bren Bear, Bear Bestie, Preena Penguin, Jayla Penguin		
2018	Tobot	Ding-yo eomma (Mrs. Park)		
2018	Dinotrux	Rexxie	Episode: "Opposites"	
2018–2021	Corner Gas Animated	Shirley	Episode: "Rum Punch"	
2018–2019	Littlest Pet Shop: A World of Our Own	Udder Chaos, Ferocious Fran, Scapper #4, Wisteria, Stage Manager Spaniel, Frankie Puffer, Lola Sandloach, Bebe LaPoodle, Celestine Slothing		
2018–2019	Super Dinosaur	Mom		
2019	Molly of Denali	Dr. Antigone		
2020	The Last Kids on Earth	Evie Snark	Episode: "Stay Tuned"	
2020–2021	My Little Pony: Pony Life	Twilight Sparkle (singing voice), Pulverizer		
2022	Team Zenko Go	Kat	6 episodes	

=== Film ===
List of voice performances in feature films
Year	Title	Role	Notes	Source
2016	Ratchet & Clank	Stanley's Mom, Ship Computer		
2017	My Little Pony: The Movie	Twilight Sparkle (singing voice)		

List of voice and dubbing performances in direct-to-video and television films
Year	Title	Role	Notes	Source
2005	Inuyasha the Movie: Swords of an Honorable Ruler	Eri, Sōta		
2006	Inuyasha the Movie: Fire on the Mystic Island	Kanade, Asagi		CA
2008	Silent Möbius	Nami Yamigumo		CA
2008	Silent Möbius 2	Nami Yamigumo, Louie		CA
2012	Journey to GloE	Wartsenall		
2013	My Little Pony Equestria Girls	Sunset Shimmer, Twilight Sparkle (singing voice)	Featured singer	
2014	My Little Pony Equestria Girls: Rainbow Rocks	Sunset Shimmer, Twilight Sparkle (singing voice)	Featured singer	
2014	Barbie: The Pearl Princess	Queen Lorelei		
2015	Barbie & Her Sisters in The Great Puppy Adventure	Tiffany		
2015	My Little Pony Equestria Girls: Friendship Games	Sunset Shimmer, Twilight Sparkle (singing voice)	Featured singer	
2016	My Little Pony Equestria Girls: Legend of Everfree	Sunset Shimmer, Twilight Sparkle (singing voice)	Featured singer	
2017	Sinbad: A Flying Princess and a Secret Island	Latifa		
2017	Sinbad: Night at High Noon and the Wonder Gate	Latifa		
2018	My Little Pony Equestria Girls: Forgotten Friendship	Sunset Shimmer, Twilight Sparkle (singing voice)		
2018	My Little Pony Equestria Girls: Rollercoaster of Friendship	Sunset Shimmer, Twilight Sparkle (singing voice)		
2019	My Little Pony: Equestria Girls: Spring Breakdown	Sunset Shimmer, Twilight Sparkle (singing voice)		
2019	My Little Pony Equestria Girls: Sunset's Backstage Pass	Sunset Shimmer		
2019	My Little Pony: Equestria Girls: Holidays Unwrapped	Sunset Shimmer		
2019	Super Monsters Furever Friends	Molasses the Sloth		
