= My Little Pony: Equestria Girls – Forgotten Friendship =

2018 animated television special

- Netflix poster
- Also known as: Most Likely to be Forgotten
- Genre: Fantasy; Adventure; Comedy; Drama; Magical girl
- Written by: Nick Confalone
- Directed by: Ishi Rudell; Katrina Hadley
- Starring: Rebecca Shoichet; Tara Strong; Ashleigh Ball; Andrea Libman; Tabitha St. Germain; Cathy Weseluck; Shannon Chan-Kent
- Composer: William Kevin Anderson
- Countries of origin: United States; Canada
- Original language: English

Production
- Executive producers: Stephen Davis; Meghan McCarthy; Kirsten Newlands; Sarah Wall
- Producers: Angela Belyea; Colleen McAllister
- Editor: Nick Confalone
- Running time: 44 minutes (TV edit); 50 minutes (unedited)
- Production companies: DHX Media; Hasbro Studios

Original release
- Network: Discovery Family
- Release: February 17, 2018

My Little Pony: Equestria Girls – Forgotten Friendship (alternatively subtitled Most Likely to be Forgotten on the YouTube release) is a 2018 animated television special within Hasbro's My Little Pony: Equestria Girls franchise, itself a spin-off of the 2010 relaunch of the My Little Pony toy line. The special was directed by Ishi Rudell and Katrina Hadley, written and edited by Nick Confalone, and produced by DHX Media Vancouver for Hasbro Studios in the United States.

Premiered on Discovery Family (a joint venture between Discovery Communications and Hasbro) on February 17, 2018, it is the first one-hour Equestria Girls special, preceding Rollercoaster of Friendship (released later in July), Spring Breakdown (2019), Sunset's Backstage Pass (2019), and Holidays Unwrapped (2019).

== Plot ==
Sunset Shimmer and her friends, Pinkie Pie, Rarity, Applejack, Rainbow Dash, Fluttershy, and Twilight Sparkle, prepare Canterlot High School's yearbook. At the office, the group meets Wallflower Blush, a meek and quiet girl who has been ignored and forgotten by the school even though she has been there for years. Trixie then appears, demanding that Sunset puts her in the yearbook as "The Greatest and Powerfullest", which Sunset points out is not a real category. In a reference to the Sunset's attitude from the first Equestria Girls movie, Trixie responds that Sunset was selected as "Biggest Meanie" in first year. Pinkie Pie comically points out it was because the whole school voted for her in that category as a product of her previous actions as a bully. (Note: As depicted in the 2013 film My Little Pony: Equestria Girls.) Angered, Trixie claims that she will have her revenge, before leaving.

The next day, Sunset goes to the beach to hang out with her friends. However, upon arriving, she discovers that most of her friends' memories of her have been erased, with Rarity, Rainbow Dash, Pinkie Pie, Fluttershy and Applejack only remembering her misdeeds as a bully, and Twilight merely remembering the time she yelled at her during the Friendship Games. (Note: As depicted in the 2015 film My Little Pony: Equestria Girls – Friendship Games.) After failing to convince her friends that she's their friend, she writes to Ponyville's Twilight Sparkle a message asking if she remembers her. When Twilight answers positively, Sunset asks her to meet her in Equestria. Once she returns to Equestria, Sunset explains everything to Twilight's Ponyville counterpart. With no other options available, the two travel to Canterlot to consult Princess Celestia, Sunset's former mentor whom she betrayed before traveling to the parallel world. Once in Celestia's castle, Sunset apologizes for her actions and the two reconcile, after which they, Princess Luna, and Twilight go to the castle's library's restricted section to investigate, suspecting Equestrian magic to be behind everything.

After hours of research, Twilight and Sunset find ancient writings about the "Memory Stone", a magical artifact capable of erasing both memories and fragments of memories, and ended up in the parallel world after Clover the Clever defeated a sorceress using it. Realizing somebody is using the stone to make everyone hate her again, Sunset returns to the parallel world, where she once again tries to explain her friends everything, only for Trixie to refute her claims. Suspecting Trixie is using the Memory Stone as her revenge for what happened the previous day, Sunset confronts Trixie in the school, only to realize she is innocent. After Sunset explains her situation, Trixie offers her help in exchange of appearing in the yearbook, which Sunset agrees. The two interrogate students throughout the school, but fail to find out anything about the stone or who has it. Meanwhile, in Equestria, Twilight discovers that the stone's effects become permanent if the stone isn't destroyed by the third day after its use, after which she sends a warning to Sunset.

In the school's yearbook office, Sunset reads Twilight's warning, which also includes a drawing of the stone's possible location. Realizing that the drawing is strikingly similar to a picture in Wallflower's screensaver, which Wallflower says she took at the school's garden, Sunset reads her mind and discovers that Wallflower is the culprit, having erased everyone's good memories of Sunset as revenge for her never noticing her and overall as jealously. As Wallflower explains her motives, Sunset tries to steal it, but Wallflower grabs it in time as Sunset furiously threatens her. In order to prevent them from trying to take the stone again, Wallflower erases Sunset and Trixie's memories of their meeting, and locks them in the office. However, Sunset had previously recorded everything in a drone the parallel world's Twilight previously made, making the two remember the incident. Trixie then uses one of her stage tricks to help Sunset escape, but is forced to remain behind.

Sunset confronts Wallflower at the school's parking lot only to talk to her instead this time, where Wallflower accidentally reveals her actions in front of Sunset's friends. After Sunset fails to reason with her, Wallflower tries to erase all of Sunset's friends' memories of high school, thus destroying their friendship. Sunset, however, jumps in and lets herself getting hit instead, erasing all of her memories of the parallel world. Feeling remorseful, seeing that Sunset was telling the truth the whole time, but touched by her sacrifice, Sunset's friends openly declare her their friend once again. After this, their geodes activate, transforming them into their powered forms, after which they destroy the stone, restoring everybody's memories. The six friends then apologize to Sunset for being unfriendly to her when they had their memories erased, but Sunset is just glad to have them back to normal. Wallflower then apologizes, explaining that she became corrupted by the stone's power after continuously using it to erase embarrassing memories of herself from others, and the group forgives her.

The next day, Sunset informs Twilight of the stone's destruction while thanking her. The school's yearbooks are released, with Trixie discovering that Sunset kept her part of their deal, and Wallflower discovers that her picture as best gardener contains the signatures of Sunset and her friends.

== Cast ==
- Rebecca Shoichet as Sunset Shimmer
- Tara Strong as Twilight Sparkle and Princess Twilight Sparkle
- Kathleen Barr as Trixie Lulamoon
- Ashleigh Ball as Rainbow Dash, Applejack and Nurse Redheart
- Andrea Libman as Pinkie Pie and Fluttershy
- Tabitha St. Germain as Rarity and Princess/Vice Principal Luna
- Cathy Weseluck as Spike the Dog
- Shannon Chan-Kent as Wallflower Blush
- Nicole Oliver as Princess Celestia
- Ingrid Nilson as Maud Pie
- James Kirk as Micro Chips

=== Featured Singers ===
- Rebecca Shoichet - Twilight Sparkle
- Shannon Chan-Kent - Pinkie Pie
- Kazumi Evans - Rarity

== Release and other media ==
Forgotten Friendship premiered on Discovery Family (a joint venture between Discovery Communications and Hasbro) on February 17, 2018.

=== Home media and streaming ===
On YouTube, the original 50-minute version of the special (now titled Most Likely to be Forgotten) was released by Hasbro's channel, divided into five parts. Its first episode was uploaded on March 9, 2018, and its last episode on April 6.

On October 1, 2018, the special was made available on the Netflix video streaming service in the United States alongside Rollercoaster of Friendship.

It was bundled with Rollercoaster of Friendship and released on DVD on November 1, 2018 in the United Kingdom.

=== Novelization ===
A novelization by author Perdita Finn, titled A Friendship to Remember, was published on December 5, 2017.
