= My Little Pony: Equestria Girls (web series) =

Canadian-American animated web series

- Genre: Animation; Adventure; Children's series; Comedy; Musical; Magical girl
- Based on: My Little Pony: Friendship Is Magic by Lauren Faust
- Directed by: Ishi Rudell; Katrina Hadley (season 2)
- Voices of: Rebecca Shoichet; Tara Strong; Ashleigh Ball; Andrea Libman; Tabitha St. Germain; Cathy Weseluck
- Composers: Matthew Sorensen (season 2); William Kevin Anderson (season 1–2)
- Countries of origin: United States; Canada
- Original language: English
- No. of seasons: 2
- No. of episodes: 70

Production
- Executive producers: Stephen Davis; Meghan McCarthy; Kirsten Newlands; Sarah Wall
- Producers: Angela Belyea; Colleen McAllister
- Running time: 2-3 minutes
- Production companies: DHX Media; Hasbro Studios

Original release
- Network: Discovery Family; YouTube
- Release: November 17, 2017 – June 23, 2020

My Little Pony: Equestria Girls is an animated web series based on the eponymous toyline and media franchise, itself being a spin-off of the 2010 relaunch of Hasbro's My Little Pony toyline franchise. It refocuses on the main characters from the My Little Pony: Friendship Is Magic television series, re-envisioned as human teenagers attending high school. The series premiered on November 17, 2017, on YouTube. The first season was marketed with the theme "Better Together".

The series ended its run following its second season on June 23, 2020, after WildBrain (operating at the time as DHX Media Vancouver) had left its production in 2019.

== Production and release ==
This series marks the debut of a new wardrobe for the main characters. The girls' new clothing were designed by celebrity fashion stylist Laura Schuffman.

In January 2020, YouTube amended its policies regarding child-oriented videos, after the service was fined by the United States Federal Trade Commission for violating Children's Online Privacy Protection Act (COPPA) in September 2019. Under the revised policies, the operators of a YouTube channel need to mark a child-oriented video (or entire channel aimed at children) as such; the marked videos are restricted from utilizing certain functions of YouTube, including on-screen interactivity. The "You Choose the Ending" interactive shorts as uploaded on YouTube were affected by the change.

In March 2021, writer and story editor Nick Confalone revealed that the writing staff had plans for a third season as well as an official ending for the series, but Hasbro was uninterested.

== Character voices ==
=== Main character voices ===
Voice actor	Primary characters	Additional roles
Rebecca Shoichet	Sunset Shimmer (speaking/singing), Twilight Sparkle (singing)	Customer, Band Member, Security Guard
Tara Strong	Twilight Sparkle (speaking)	Carrot Bun (credited as "Attendant"), Rosette Nebula
Ashleigh Ball	Rainbow Dash and Applejack (speaking/singing)	Prim Hemline, Female Director, Prom Girl, Doo Wop, Nurse Redheart, Employee, Girl #1
Andrea Libman	Pinkie Pie (speaking) and Fluttershy (speaking/singing)	Old Lady, Lighting Girl, Pinkie Pie (rapping in "I'm on a Yacht")
Shannon Chan-Kent	Pinkie Pie (singing)	Sonata Dusk (singing)
Tabitha St. Germain	Rarity (speaking)	Student, Lily Pad, Granny Smith, Sunny Sugarsocks, Photo Finish, Taxi Driver, Girl #2
Kazumi Evans	Rarity (singing)	Adagio Dazzle
Cathy Weseluck	Spike	

=== Supporting character voices ===
Voice actors	Characters
Ingrid Nilson	Maud Pie, Young Girl
Vincent Tong	Flash Sentry, Sandalwood, Cashier, Jewelry Store Owner, Thief
Kathleen Barr	Trixie Lulamoon, Child's Mom
Michelle Creber	Apple Bloom
Claire Corlett	Sweetie Belle
Madeleine Peters	Scootaloo
Ryan Beil	Zephyr Breeze
Nicole Oliver	Ms. Cheerilee, Principal Celestia
Brian Doe	Timber Spruce
Peter New	Victor (credited as "Museum Employee"), Goldie Delicious, Big Mac
Richard Newman	Mr. Cranky Doodle
Michael Dobson	Bulk Biceps
Chantal Strand	Diamond Tiara
Shannon Chan-Kent	Silver Spoon
James Kirk	Micro Chips, Fan Boy
Lee Tockar	Snips
Richard Ian Cox	Snails
Tegan Moss	Vignette Valencia
Mariee Devereux	Supernova Zap (Su-Z)
Scott Perrie	Dirk Thistleweed
Shylo Sharity	Aria Blaze (singing)

== Series overview ==
Season	Episodes		Originally released		Runtime	Total runtime
Season	Episodes		First released	Last released	Runtime	Total runtime
1	37	27 (Main)	November 17, 2017	October 5, 2018	72 minutes	134 minutes
1	37	10 (CYOE)	February 2, 2018	August 24, 2018	62 minutes	134 minutes
2	33	24 (Main)	January 11, 2019	March 8, 2020	55 minutes	107 minutes
2	33	9 (CYOE)	September 3, 2019	June 23, 2020	52 minutes	107 minutes

== Episodes ==
=== Season 1 (2017–2018) ===
Season 1 contains 37 episodes (including the 10 interactive episodes), with the first episode premiering on November 17, 2017. The season took a short break in Spring 2018, and an extended summer break before the final short, which broadcast on October 5, 2018.

==== Shorts ====
No. overall	No. in season	Title	Directed by	Written by	Length	Original release date
1	1	"A Fine Line"	Ishi Rudell	Gillian M. Berrow and Sam To	2:44	November 17, 2017
At the Canterlot Mall, Sunset Shimmer gets in line for the new video game Tirek's Revenge but finds it to be exceedingly long. As time passes, Sunset gets stir-crazy and jealous of the fun that other people in line are having with their friends. Just then, Rainbow Dash arrives, and upon realizing that Sunset is waiting in line by herself, she uses her super speed to get the rest of their friends, making Sunset's wait in line more bearable. By the time she gets to the front of the line, the game is completely sold out. Luckily, Pinkie Pie had pre-ordered the game for her a few weeks ago, and the girls go home to play it together.
2	2	"School of Rock"	Ishi Rudell	Gillian M. Berrow and Tori Grant	2:35	November 24, 2017
At the Canterlot Natural History Museum, Maud Pie gives a boring lecture about rocks. As the museum patrons become bored to tears, Pinkie Pie, Rarity, and Twilight Sparkle use their geode powers to give the lecture some pizzazz. At the lecture's conclusion, the patrons cheer with excitement, and a young girl in Maud's fan club asks for her autograph.
3	3	"Queen of Clubs"	Ishi Rudell	Gillian M. Berrow and Selena Marchetti	2:39	December 1, 2017
Applejack brings a pig to school, explaining to her friends that she needs it for the Young Farmers' Club yearbook photo. When Rainbow Dash brags about being in five different school clubs, Applejack boasts that she is in six. Despite Rarity insisting it is not a competition, Rainbow and Applejack join as many clubs as possible to see who will be in the most yearbook photos. When the yearbook is published, their competition ends in a tie. As it turns out, there was one school club left that neither of them joined: an exclusive fashion club in which Rarity is the president and Applejack's pig is the vice-president.
4	4	"Pinkie Sitting"	Ishi Rudell	Gillian M. Berrow and Tori Grant	2:46	December 8, 2017
Pinkie Pie fills in for Rarity as babysitter for a little girl named Lily Pad when Rarity gets invited to a fashion designers' gala at the last minute. Pinkie suggests some fun activities for them to do, but Lily would rather sit quietly and read a book. As time passes by, Pinkie gets bored and asks Lily what she's reading. As Lily explains the premise of the pirate-themed story, Pinkie starts spontaneously acting out the scenes. Later that evening, Lily finishes reading the book out loud, and Pinkie compliments Lily on her babysitting skills before falling asleep.
5	5	"The Finals Countdown"	Ishi Rudell	Gillian M. Berrow and Selena Marchetti	2:36	December 15, 2017
In Miss Cheerilee's class, Cheerilee reminds the students that final exams are two weeks away. The Equestria Girls are stressed about their finals, but Twilight is confident they can pass. Over the next couple of weeks, she helps her friends study and set aside all distractions while singing the song "Rise Up!". When conventional studying doesn't work, she helps them learn by catering to their individual styles and interests. On the day of their finals, the girls pass with flying colors.
6	6	"Overpowered"	Ishi Rudell	Gillian M. Berrow and Sam To	2:42	December 22, 2017
One day at school, Sunset Shimmer's empathy powers get so out of control that she starts hearing others' thoughts without touching them, and she discovers her friends are experiencing the same thing. As they wonder why, Rainbow Dash zooms in with her super speed, bragging about using her powers to do everything. Twilight theorizes that, because their magical geodes are connected, the more each of the girls use their powers for everyday tasks, the more they get supercharged. So they agree to use their geodes in moderation. When Zephyr Breeze enters and asks Rainbow out on a date, Rainbow is about to use her super speed to run away, but her friends warn her not to, and she simply walks away from Zephyr. Later, Sunset's powers return to normal.
7	7	"Star Crossed"	Ishi Rudell	Gillian M. Berrow and Tori Grant	2:57	December 29, 2017
Twilight is excited about her upcoming date with Timber Spruce at the planetarium, which she insists is merely a "hang-out". She has the entire evening planned out, and Fluttershy gives her something special for the occasion: a jar of bugs. At the planetarium, Twilight and Timber start their evening together, but all of Twilight's planning ends up being in vain: the exhibit on gravitational fields has been removed, the planetarium show has been canceled, and the sky is overcast with clouds, preventing them from seeing the stars and constellations with the telescope. Twilight is disappointed that she wasn't able to impress Timber, and Timber is equally disappointed about not being able to impress her with his new knowledge on astronomy. When Twilight lightly kicks her backpack, the bugs in the jar Fluttershy gave her fly out, revealed to be fireflies, and they light up the night by forming the constellations. Starstruck, the two spend the rest of the evening looking at the fireflies.
8	8	"My Little Shop of Horrors"	Ishi Rudell	Gillian M. Berrow and Selena Marchetti	2:53	January 5, 2018
Principal Celestia leaves Twilight Sparkle and Spike in charge of tending to her garden while she's on vacation. Unbeknownst to Twilight, some Equestrian magic enchants her watering can. As Twilight begins watering and singing to the plants, the plants start to grow and come to life, singing along to Twilight's song. As Twilight gives them more and more water, the singing plants become increasingly aggressive and demand more. Twilight sends an SOS text to Applejack, and when she arrives, she turns on the sprinklers to turn the plants back to normal. Just then, Celestia returns and warns Twilight not to over-water the plants.
9	9	"A Little Birdie Told Me"	Ishi Rudell	Gillian M. Berrow and Gloria Jenkins	2:50	January 12, 2018
In Cranky Doodle's class, Mr. Doodle administers a pop quiz to his students. As the students begin, Trixie Lulamoon catches Fluttershy talking math with her bird friends and openly accuses her of cheating on the quiz. Fluttershy explains that she was just settling an argument about nests, but Trixie doesn't believe her. So Fluttershy goes up to the chalkboard and solves a complex math equation without the help of her bird friends, much to Trixie's embarrassment. Later, Trixie approaches the birds and asks one of them to be her tutor.
10	10	"Display of Affection"	Ishi Rudell	Gillian M. Berrow and Sam To	2:47	January 19, 2018
During her fashion internship at Prim Hemline's boutique, Rarity is tasked with designing a new window display for a visiting Fashion Week style scout. Unfortunately, the pressure starts to get to her, and she confides in Sunset Shimmer. As they walk through the city, they come upon some graffiti drawn by a mysterious and popular street artist named "Flanksy", and Rarity gets inspiration. Later that night, she is dissatisfied with her finished work, but Sunset gets an idea. The next day, Rarity returns to the shop and sees a crowd of people impressed by the now improved window display, including Prim Hemline. Looking behind her, Rarity sees Sunset in an alleyway with paint on her cheek and realizes that Sunset is in fact "Flanksy".
11	11	"Super Squad Goals"	Ishi Rudell	Gillian M. Berrow and Tori Grant	2:47	January 26, 2018
In a comic book-style setting, the Equestria Girls discuss their big-city plans for the day when they witness a jewelry store being robbed. Using their magical geodes, the girls transform into their Crystal Guardian outfits and chase after the thief, superhero style. After a while of chasing, the girls catch the thief and send him to prison. They return the stolen jewels to the jewelry store owner and celebrate with treats. In the end, the whole affair is revealed to be a comic book drawn by Sunset Shimmer.
12	12	"Road Trippin'" (Note: The episode is part of a bonus feature to the My Little Pony: The Movie DVD, which was released on January 9, 2018.)	Ishi Rudell	Gillian M. Berrow and Sam To	2:45	March 2, 2018
Granny Smith drives the Rainbooms' tour bus to their scheduled appearance at Goldie Delicious' party. Along the way, Granny takes a "shortcut" past a traffic jam, Applejack and Twilight fix a flat tire, Fluttershy redirects a herd of cattle in the road, and Pinkie Pie clears away a fallen tree with her explosion powers. As the bus drives toward a broken bridge, Granny speeds up and goes through what is actually a movie set. The bus finally makes it to the party in time for Goldie to introduce the Rainbooms to the stage.
13	13	"X Marks the Spot"	Ishi Rudell	Kara Lee Burk and Selena Marchetti	2:27	April 13, 2018
While playing a game on her smartphone at the beach, Sunset Shimmer discovers a message in a bottle. She shows it to Twilight and Pinkie Pie, and they realize it's a treasure map that looks like the beach they are on. When they follow the map to a treasure chest under the pier, they discover a second message in a bottle that's encoded and a decoder ring. Sunset decodes the message using the decoder ring, and it tells them to follow a trail of seashells to an "X" at "the end of the rainbow". The "rainbow" in question is revealed to be an ice cream truck, and the "X" turns out to be a Rollin' Sushi Truck. The sushi truck attendant congratulates the girls on solving their promotional treasure hunt, for which they win sushi at a discounted price. The girls are a little disappointed at not finding real treasure, but they enjoy the sushi anyway.
14	14	"Aw...Baby Turtles"	Ishi Rudell	Kara Lee Burk and Tori Grant	2:59	April 20, 2018
While sunbathing at the beach, Fluttershy hears the sound of recently hatched and crying baby sea turtles. Fluttershy wants to help them get to the water, and Rainbow Dash uses Tank's help to find them. They and their friends then spend the afternoon clearing a path for the sea turtles to get to the water. However, by the time they finish clearing a path, Tank has already led the baby turtles to the ocean. Having imprinted onto Tank and believing him to be their parent, the sea turtles bid him farewell and swim off into the sea.
15	15	"The Salty Sails"	Ishi Rudell	Whitney Ralls and Jeff Bittle	2:51	April 27, 2018
Twilight, Pinkie, and Rarity prepare to go sailing at the beach, with Twilight having memorized a nautical dictionary just for the occasion. Rarity overpacks for the trip, and Twilight is forced to leave her luggage behind due to the extra weight on the boat. When the sea winds carry the boat in the wrong direction, Twilight guides her friends in correcting their course, but the turbulent waters cause her to lose her map. As the boat heads on a collision course with a large rock, Pinkie uses her geode powers to create a wave that brings the boat back to the pier. With the three girls soaked, Rarity produces some towels, and they share a laugh over their exciting adventure.
16	16	"Lost and Found"	Ishi Rudell	Kate Leth and Selena Marchetti	2:44	May 4, 2018
Rarity interrupts Applejack and Rainbow Dash in the middle of their lounging on the beach and tells them she lost one of her one-of-a-kind earrings. Applejack and Rainbow agree to help her find it, and she supplies them with some metal detectors. Rarity, Applejack, and Rainbow spend all afternoon looking for Rarity's missing earring, but all they find is a variety of other lost beach junk. Rarity apologizes for wasting her friends' day, but they've enjoyed the thrill of discovering things under the sand. When Rainbow Dash sees how distraught Rarity is over her lost earring, she uses her super speed to look through the pile of junk one more time. She finds an earring, but it's not the one Rarity lost. Rarity thanks her friends for their help and decides to do one more search with the metal detector. Just then, she discovers her earring was never missing—it had gotten tangled in her hair, much to her embarrassment.
17	17	"Too Hot to Handle"	Ishi Rudell	Laura Hooper Beck and Tori Grant	2:18	May 11, 2018
As Fluttershy and her friends organize an adoption for all the crabs on the beach, Pinkie Pie decides to get some shaved ice for them. On her way back from the shaved ice truck, Pinkie gives one of her cones away to a little boy who accidentally drops his on the ground, and another gets snatched by a seagull. In order to get across the hot beach sand, Pinkie rolls on a beach ball, jumps across beach umbrellas, and sails on a kite before returning to her friends. As the crabs get irritable from the heat, Pinkie gives them her last shaved ice cone so they can cool down. With no cool treats left, Rainbow Dash zooms over to the shaved ice truck to buy a second batch.
18	18	"Blue Crushed (a.k.a. Baewatch)"	Ishi Rudell	Kate Leth and Jeff Bittle	2:21	May 18, 2018
Rainbow Dash and Applejack invite Fluttershy to go surfing with them, but she doesn't know how to surf. Her brother Zephyr Breeze suddenly arrives, bragging to Rainbow about being a long-time surfer, but Fluttershy knows for a fact he is lying. When Rainbow and Applejack invite him to show them his surfing skills, he instantly loses much of his confidence but joins them anyway. Out on the waves, Rainbow and Applejack surf with ease, but Zephyr wipes out almost immediately. Back on the shore, he admits he actually doesn't know how to surf, and he begs Rainbow Dash for forgiveness and surfing lessons. Begrudgingly, Rainbow agrees to give Zephyr some pointers.
19	19	"Unsolved Selfie Mysteries"	Ishi Rudell	Nina Daniels and Selena Marchetti	2:12	May 25, 2018
Pinkie Pie, Twilight Sparkle, Sunset Shimmer, and Fluttershy take a selfie at the beach, and Twilight notices a black splotch in the photo's background. Sunset and Pinkie believe it to be a sea monster, but Twilight and Fluttershy are more skeptical. They each decide to do their own investigations into the matter. Twilight views the ocean from the lifeguard stand, accompanied by Timber Spruce. Just as Sunset and Pinkie approach the ocean, Pinkie realizes she doesn't have her floatie. Suddenly, something rises out of the water and approaches the shore, and even Twilight and Timber begin to believe it is a sea monster. It turns out to be Fluttershy, and she reveals the true identity of the "sea monster": Pinkie's missing floatie.
20	20	"Friendship Math"	Ishi Rudell	M.J. Offen and Tori Grant	2:32	June 1, 2018
Pinkie Pie picks up a magazine Rarity left behind on her beach chair and finds a "best friends" quiz inside, and she decides to take the quiz with Twilight. Unfortunately, they keep coming up with the wrong answers to questions such as "What is your best friend's favorite food?" and "What is your friend's biggest fear?", and they both score a zero. Unable to accept the idea of failing a test, Twilight decides to run her own equations to prove that she and Pinkie are best friends. After several hours of writing equations in the sand, Twilight finally comes up with the answer, but the ocean tide washes her equations away. Pinkie fears all of Twilight's work was for nothing, but Twilight tells her their friendship cannot be measured by numbers.
21	21	"Turf War"	Ishi Rudell	Laura Hooper Beck and Jeff Bittle	2:35	June 8, 2018
Applejack is the substitute lifeguard on duty at the beach. Usual lifeguard Timber Spruce tells her lifeguard duty is typically uneventful, but Applejack resolves to be prepared for anything. When someone cries out for help, Applejack is the first to respond. When someone else gets in trouble, Timber Spruce springs to action so that Applejack doesn't make him look bad. This turns into a light competition between the two to see who can respond to trouble the fastest. When Bulk Biceps cries out for help in the water, Applejack and Timber both swim out to save him, but they pull him in opposite directions. Bulk starts to cry, not wanting to see Applejack and Timber fight. The two lifeguards realize their competition has been silly and that they actually make a good team, and they pull Bulk to shore together. Their determination to save people on the beach thus turns more friendly than competitive, much to Bulk's joy.
22	22	"The Last Day of School"	Ishi Rudell	Kate Leth and Selena Marchetti	2:35	June 15, 2018
It's the last day of school at Canterlot High, and while Rainbow Dash is excited, Twilight is dismayed. 4 hours before the last school bell, Twilight tries to get in as much extra credit work as possible and write thank-you letters to all of her teachers. Meanwhile, Rainbow Dash wants the school day to be over as soon as possible. In their last class of the day with Miss Cheerilee, Rainbow Dash convinces her to play a Daring Do movie during class. Throughout the film, Twilight rushes to finish her extra credit projects, and Rainbow Dash keeps looking at the clock. When the bell rings, Twilight wails in despair over not finishing her projects. Fortunately, Rainbow Dash points out that she can read anything she wants during the summer and even go to the library. Twilight's mood instantly turns around, and she is excited for summer vacation.
23	23	"Outtakes"	Ishi Rudell	Whitney Ralls and Tori Grant	2:32	June 22, 2018
At the Canterlot Animal Shelter, Fluttershy sets up a camera to shoot an adoption commercial for the shelter animals. As soon as she finishes setting up, however, she gets nervous at the thought of hundreds of people watching her on TV. This nervousness causes her to film several bad camera takes. Changing her approach, she decides to film the animals from behind the camera, but the animals act rowdy and unpredictable all throughout her filming. When Twilight and Applejack arrive later, Fluttershy loses all hope for making a good commercial. But after seeing the footage she already took, Twilight and Applejack tell her she perfectly captured the fun of having a pet. With a little editing, Fluttershy finishes making her commercial.
24	24	"Pinkie Pie: Snack Psychic"	Ishi Rudell	Laura Hooper Beck and Jeff Bittle	2:19	June 29, 2018
During her job at the Sweet Snacks Cafe, Pinkie Pie helps out her troubled customers based on what they order. She figures out that Flash Sentry has a big math test coming up and gets Twilight to be his tutor. When "Blueberry Cake" stains her prom dress, Pinkie gets Rarity to fix it. When the Crystal Prep swimming team loses the swim meet, Pinkie gets Rainbow Dash to help them with their training. Sunny Sugarsocks asks Pinkie how she always knows exactly what her customers need, and Pinkie says it is just a gut feeling. When Pinkie's stomach suddenly growls with hunger, Sunny makes her a giant ice cream sundae.
25	25	"'Five to Nine' Music Video"	Ishi Rudell	Gillian M. Berrow and Selena Marchetti	2:38	July 6, 2018
A music video in which Applejack puts in a full day's work to get the barn ready for a hoedown party with her friends that evening.
26	26	"'So Much More to Me' Music Video"	Ishi Rudell	Kate Leth and Tori Grant	3:00	July 13, 2018
A music video in which Fluttershy puts on a private singing performance for the animals at the Canterlot Animal Shelter.
27	27	"'The Other Side' Music Video"	Ishi Rudell	John Jennings Boyd, Lisette Bustamante and Selena Marchetti	2:49	October 5, 2018
A music video in which Rarity struggles to rekindle her creativity.

==== You Choose the Ending ====
No. overall	No. in season	Title	Directed by	Written by	Featured character	Duration (w/ endings)	Original release date
12	12	"Fluttershy's Butterflies"	Ishi Rudell	Nick Confalone	Fluttershy	5:57	February 2, 2018
13	13	"Text Support"	Ishi Rudell	Jim Martin	Twilight Sparkle	5:45	February 9, 2018
14	14	"Driving Miss Shimmer"	Ishi Rudell	Kate Leth	Sunset Shimmer	5:38	February 16, 2018
15	15	"Best Trends Forever"	Ishi Rudell	Whitney Ralls	Rarity	6:32	February 23, 2018
31	31	"Stressed in Show"	Ishi Rudell	Kelly D'Angelo	Twilight Sparkle	6:20	July 20, 2018
32	32	"Rarity Investigates: The Case of the Bedazzled Boot"	Ishi Rudell	Julia Prescott	Rarity	6:41	July 27, 2018
33	33	"All the World's Off Stage"	Ishi Rudell	Christopher Godfrey	Sunset Shimmer	6:09	August 3, 2018
34	34	"Constructive Criticism"	Ishi Rudell	Jim Martin	Applejack	6:12	August 10, 2018
35	35	"Opening Night"	Ishi Rudell	Kelly D'Angelo	Fluttershy	6:22	August 17, 2018
36	36	"Happily Ever Afterparty"	Ishi Rudell	Whitney Ralls	Cutie Mark Crusaders	6:40	August 24, 2018

=== Season 2 (2019–2020) ===
Season 2 began shortly after the end of the first season, on January 11, 2019. The season had a mini break from April 12 until May 17, and again from July 12 to August 23, 2019, before taking a six-month hiatus in September 2019. The season resumed in March 2020, with a music video in commemoration of International Women's Day. The season finally ended with the special "Tip Toppings", which aired on June 23, 2020.

==== Shorts ====
No. overall	No. in season	Title	Directed by	Written by	Length	Original release date
38	1	"Reboxing with Spike!"	Ishi Rudell and Katrina Hadley	Gillian M. Berrow and Jeff Bittle	1:57	January 11, 2019
Spike records an unboxing video of a batch of upscale dog toys he has ordered for himself, including an old and dirty sock. When Twilight Sparkle finds out how much he spent though, she makes him send the toys back.
39	2	"D.I.Y. with Applejack"	Ishi Rudell and Katrina Hadley	Laura Hooper Beck, Bevin Brand and Sara Kim	2:29	January 18, 2019
Applejack tries to record a video of the steps involved in building a dressing room for Rarity, but assorted mishaps and Rarity's interruptions complicate the project.
40	3	"The Craft of Cookies"	Ishi Rudell and Katrina Hadley	Laura Hooper Beck and Selena Marchetti	2:31	January 25, 2019
Pinkie Pie records a cooking video in which she makes a batch of cookies. Rainbow Dash's pet tortoise Tank keeps trying to eat the ingredients to no avail, but Pinkie gives him a cookie to thank him.
41	4	"Street Magic with Trixie!"	Ishi Rudell and Katrina Hadley	Laura Hooper Beck and Jeff Bittle	1:16	February 1, 2019
Twilight Sparkle surreptitiously uses her telekinesis to liven up Trixie's street magic show.
42	5	"Sic Skateboard"	Ishi Rudell and Katrina Hadley	Gillian M. Berrow and Selena Marchetti	2:01	February 8, 2019
Rainbow Dash records a video of herself and Tank showing off tricks at a skateboarding park.
43	6	"Street Chic"	Ishi Rudell and Katrina Hadley	Laura Hooper Beck and Jeff Bittle	2:19	February 15, 2019
Rarity dresses Applejack, Fluttershy and Rainbow Dash in new summer outfits, unaware of the cold and windy fall weather.
44	7	"Game Stream"	Ishi Rudell and Katrina Hadley	Katie Chilson and Gemma Findlay	2:09	February 22, 2019
Fluttershy surprises Sunset Shimmer with her amazing gaming skills as she and Sunset record a video game playthrough video together.
45	8	"Best in Show: The Pre-Show"	Ishi Rudell and Katrina Hadley	Gillian M. Berrow and Selena Marchetti	2:04	March 1, 2019
Applejack and Fluttershy go backstage at a pet show, showcasing several Canterlot High School students and their pets.
46	9	"Best in Show: The Victory Lap"	Ishi Rudell and Katrina Hadley	Katie Chilson and Selena Marchetti	2:14	March 8, 2019
Applejack and Fluttershy present the winners of the pet show.
47	10	"Schedule Swap"	Ishi Rudell and Katrina Hadley	Gillian M. Berrow and Jeff Bittle	2:39	March 15, 2019 (Note: Released on the Discovery Family Go! mobile application on March 9, 2019.)
The girls complain to Principal Celestia after discovering that their class schedules keep them from being together during the school day. Sunset's with Principal Celestia in her office.
48	11	"Twilight Under the Stars"	Ishi Rudell and Katrina Hadley	Gillian M. Berrow and Gemma Findlay	2:21	March 22, 2019 (Note: Released on the Discovery Family Go! mobile application on March 16, 2019.)
Pinkie Pie tries to help Twilight overcome her nervousness so she can meet one of her favorite scientists.
49	12	"Five Stars"	Ishi Rudell and Katrina Hadley	Gillian M. Berrow, Kate Chilson and Jeff Bittle	2:42	March 29, 2019
After reading a bad review online about her work at Sweet Snacks Café, Pinkie Pie tries to provide a better dining experience to a picky patron.
50	13	"FOMO"	Ishi Rudell and Katrina Hadley	Gillian M. Berrow, Kate Chilson and Selena Marchetti	2:20	April 5, 2019
Rarity becomes determined to find out what her friends are doing after school.
51	14	"I'm on a Yacht"	Ishi Rudell and Katrina Hadley	John Boyd, Lisette Bustamante and Jeff Bittle	2:44	May 24, 2019 (Note: Released on the Discovery Family Go! mobile application on May 5, 2019.)
The Equestria Girls perform a music video parody of The Lonely Island's "I'm on a Boat".
52	15	"Run to Break Free"	Ishi Rudell and Katrina Hadley	Jess Furman, Jessica Vaughn, Dan Whittemore and Selena Marchetti	2:45	May 31, 2019
A music video in which Rainbow Dash sings about constantly living life in slow motion.
53	16	"Camping Must-Haves"	Ishi Rudell and Katrina Hadley	Katie Chilson and Megan Parker	2:28	June 7, 2019 (Note: Released on the Discovery Family Go! mobile application on May 12, 2019.)
Applejack and Rarity host an internet video about camping essentials as they prepare for an overnight music festival.
54	17	"Festival Filters"	Ishi Rudell and Katrina Hadley	Katie Chilson and Selena Marchetti	2:07	June 14, 2019
At the music festival, Sunset takes a selfie with her friends; when Rarity asks what kind of photo filter she will use, Sunset considers not using one, much to her friends' shock.
55	18	"How to Backstage"	Ishi Rudell and Katrina Hadley	Katie Chilson and Jeff Bittle	2:03	June 21, 2019 (Note: Released on the Discovery Family Go! mobile application on May 19, 2019.)
Sunset Shimmer gains a V.I.P. (Very Important Price) pass to the music festival's backstage area and uses Twilight Sparkle's selfie drone to film a tour of the various rooms.
56	19	"Festival Looks"	Ishi Rudell and Katrina Hadley	Katie Chilson and Roxy Beiklik	1:55	June 28, 2019 (Note: Released on the Discovery Family Go! mobile application on May 26, 2019.)
Rarity hosts an internet video, with all of her friends contributing, about achieving the perfect music festival look.
57	20	"Five Lines You Need to Stand In"	Ishi Rudell and Katrina Hadley	Katie Chilson and Sara Kim	2:18	July 5, 2019 (Note: Released on the Discovery Family Go! mobile application on June 2, 2019.)
Using Twilight's selfie drone, Pinkie Pie does a "Top 5" countdown list of the best lines to stand in at the music festival.
58	21	"Do It For the Ponygram!"	Ishi Rudell and Katrina Hadley	Nick Confalone and Sara Kim	3:04	August 30, 2019
A collection of brief video clips recorded by the girls at home and school, interspersed with bloopers from past shorts.
59	22	"Find the Magic"	Ishi Rudell and Katrina Hadley	Jarl Aanestad, Jess Furman, Jessica Vaughn and Megan Parker	2:29	September 1, 2019 (Note: Released on the Discovery Family Go! mobile application on June 9, 2019.)
A music video in which the Dazzlings start to look for beauty and wonder in simple things.
69	32	"Let It Rain"	Ishi Rudell and Katrina Hadley	John Boyd, Jess Furman, Jessica Vaughn and Selena Marchetti	2:38	February 4, 2020 (Note: Released on the Discovery Family Go! mobile application on August 25, 2019.)
A music video in which Sunset Shimmer sings about how everyone at the Starswirl Music Festival should experience in weather.
70	33	"Cheer You On"	Ishi Rudell and Katrina Hadley	John Boyd, Jess Furman, Jessica Vaughn and Jeff Bittle	2:48	March 8, 2020 (Note: Released on the Discovery Family Go! mobile application on September 1, 2019.)
A music video in which Flash Sentry expresses his admiration and respect for the Equestria Girls as they fight a school-destroying robot.

==== You Choose the Ending ====
No. overall	No. in season	Title	Directed by	Written by	Featured character	Duration (w/ endings)	Original release date
60	23	"Wake-Up!"	Ishi Rudell	Kate Leth	Sunset Shimmer	6:00	September 3, 2019 (Note: Released on the Discovery Family Go! mobile application on June 16, 2019.)
61	24	"The Last Drop"	Ishi Rudell	Whitney Ralls	DJ Pon-3	5:36	September 6, 2019 (Note: Released on the Discovery Family Go! mobile application on June 23, 2019.)
62	25	"Inclement Leather"	Ishi Rudell	Anna Christopher	Rarity	5:36	September 8, 2019 (Note: Released on the Discovery Family Go! mobile application on June 30, 2019.)
63	26	"Lost and Pound"	Ishi Rudell	Jim Martin	Thunder Guts	6:13	September 10, 2019 (Note: Released on the Discovery Family Go! mobile application on July 7, 2019.)
64	27	"Accountibilibuddies"	Ishi Rudell	Jim Martin	Applejack	6:12	September 13, 2019 (Note: Released on the Discovery Family Go! mobile application on July 14, 2019.)
65	28	"The Road Less Scheduled"	Ishi Rudell	Anna Christopher	Twilight Sparkle	6:13	September 15, 2019 (Note: Released on the Discovery Family Go! mobile application on July 21, 2019.)
66	29	"Costume Conundrum"	Ishi Rudell	Jim Martin	Fluttershy	4:58	February 17, 2020 (Note: Released on the Discovery Family Go! mobile application on August 21, 2019.)
67	30	"Sock It To Me"	Ishi Rudell	Katie Chilson	Rainbow Dash	5:43	April 5, 2020 (Note: Released on the Discovery Family Go! mobile application on August 4, 2019.)
68	31	"Tip Toppings"	Ishi Rudell	Kate Leth	Pinkie Pie	4:50	June 23, 2020 (Note: Released on the Discovery Family Go! mobile application on August 11, 2019.)
