= My Little Pony: Equestria Girls – Sunset's Backstage Pass =

2019 animated television special

- Title card
- Genre: Fantasy; Comedy; Magical girl
- Written by: Whitney Ralls
- Directed by: Ishi Rudell; Katrina Hadley
- Starring: Rebecca Shoichet; Andrea Libman; Ashleigh Ball; Tara Strong; Tabitha St. Germain; Lili Beaudoin; Mariee Devereux
- Composers: Matthew Sorensen; William Kevin Anderson; Jessica Vaughn, Jess Furman, her0ism and Jarl Aanestad (songs)
- Countries of origin: United States; Canada
- Original language: English

Production
- Executive producers: Stephen Davis; Meghan McCarthy; Kirsten Newlands; Sarah Wall
- Producers: Angela Belyea; Katherine Crownover; Colleen McAllister
- Editor: Nick Confalone
- Running time: 44 minutes
- Production companies: DHX Media; Allspark Animation

Original release
- Network: Discovery Family
- Release: July 27, 2019

My Little Pony: Equestria Girls – Sunset's Backstage Pass is a 2019 animated television special within Hasbro's My Little Pony: Equestria Girls franchise, itself a spin-off of the 2010 relaunch of the My Little Pony toy line. The special was directed by Ishi Rudell and Katrina Hadley, written by Whitney Ralls, and produced by DHX Media Vancouver for Allspark Animation in the United States.

Sunset's Backstage Pass premiered on Discovery Family (a joint venture between Discovery, Inc. and Hasbro) on July 27, 2019. It is the first one-hour Equestria Girls special not to be written by Nick Confalone, though he continued his editing duties from the previous specials. It is also the last special to feature an hour-long story, much like predecessors Forgotten Friendship (2018), Rollercoaster of Friendship (2018), Spring Breakdown (2019). The final Equestria Girls special, Holidays Unwrapped (released later in November), is a compilation of six seven-minute shorts.

== Plot ==
The protagonists travel to the Starswirled Music Festival, a two-day live music event. Sunset Shimmer and Pinkie Pie are excited at the prospect of a reunion performance by PostCrush, their favorite pop duo, comprising vocalist/guitarist Kiwi Lollipop (K-Lo) and drummer Supernova Zap (Su-Z). Throughout the first day, Sunset deals with a number of minor annoyances, many of which involve an easily distracted Pinkie. The two are kicked out of the festival after Pinkie destroys a churro vendor's cart, and Sunset angrily rejects Pinkie's attempted apology. As she sits despondently on a hilltop overlooking the site, a blast of magical energy suddenly washes over her.

When Sunset wakes up the next morning, she finds that she is reliving the first day of the festival. She tries to keep Pinkie from being sidetracked, but Pinkie again breaks the churro cart and gets both of them kicked out. On the next repetition of the day, Sunset leaves Pinkie behind and gets a front-row spot to see PostCrush perform, unaware of Pinkie's heartbreak and the other girls' disapproval of her decision.

Sunset is shocked to discover that she is still reliving the same day time after time, despite having achieved her goal, and blames Pinkie for the situation. After experiencing the same days for two weeks, Sunset tries to break the loop by driving Rarity's RV away from the festival in the middle of the night, but it breaks down and leaves her stuck in the loop. The next day, Sunset sends a message to Princess Twilight Sparkle in Equestria. Twilight replies by telling Sunset the loop is caused by a magical Equestrian artifact called the Time Twirler. Sunset decides to find whoever is using the artifact and break the loop.

The lyrics of a song by the Sirens/Dazzlings lead Sunset and her friends to believe that they are using the Time Twirler, but Adagio Dazzle explains to Sunset that they never regained their magic after losing it and have nothing to do with the time loop. Resolving to treat Pinkie better, Sunset indulges her in a range of activities on the next repetition. The two sneak backstage to meet PostCrush and discover the pair found the Time Twirler on the night before the festival. They have been using its spell to reset the day every time something goes wrong with their set, in order to deliver a flawless performance.

A security guard kicks Sunset and Pinkie out at PostCrush's request, but later readmits them. They confront the duo just as the show begins; Pinkie knocks the Time Twirler off K-Lo's hair bow and Sunset smashes it on the ground, finally breaking its spell. K-Lo and Su-Z despair over no longer being able to repeat the day, but Sunset reassures them that their fans just want to see them performing and having fun. The duo expresses remorse for their actions and reconcile, putting on a lively show with Sunset and Pinkie.

The next morning, Sunset is delighted to discover it is now the second day of the festival. Remarking that she has been stuck in the loop for three weeks, she sets out to enjoy the day with Pinkie.

== Cast ==
- Rebecca Shoichet as Sunset Shimmer
- Andrea Libman as Pinkie Pie, Fluttershy and Sweetie Drops
- Ashleigh Ball as Applejack, Rainbow Dash and Lyra Heartstrings
- Tara Strong as Twilight Sparkle and Princess Twilight Sparkle
- Tabitha St. Germain as Rarity and PostCrush Announcer
- Lili Beaudoin as K-Lo
- Mariee Devereux as Su-Z
- Kazumi Evans as Adagio Dazzle
- Diana Kaarina as Aria Blaze
- Maryke Hendrikse as Sonata Dusk
- Kathleen Barr as Puffed Pastry
- Lee Tockar as Snips, Festival Artist, Festival Intern
- Michael Dobson as Security Guard

=== Featured Singers ===
- Marie Hui - K-Lo
- Arielle Tuliao - Su-Z
- Shylo Sharity - Aria Blaze
- Shannon Chan-Kent - Pinkie Pie, Sonata Dusk

== Release and other media ==
Sunset's Backstage Pass aired on July 27, 2019, on Discovery Family (a joint venture between Discovery, Inc. and Hasbro). On YouTube, My Little Pony's official channel has uploaded the special into six parts. Its first episode was uploaded on September 17, 2019, and its last episode on October 13.

A novelization titled My Little Pony: Equestria Girls: Make Your Own Magic: Starswirl Do-Over was published on February 5, 2019.
