= My Little Pony: Equestria Girls – Rollercoaster of Friendship =

2018 television special of My Little Pony: Equestria Girls

- Netflix poster
- Genre: Fantasy; Comedy; Magical girl
- Written by: Nick Confalone
- Directed by: Ishi Rudell; Katrina Hadley
- Starring: Tabitha St. Germain; Ashleigh Ball; Rebecca Shoichet; Tara Strong; Andrea Libman; Tegan Moss
- Composers: William Kevin Anderson; John Jennings Boyd and Lisette Bustamante (song)
- Countries of origin: United States; Canada
- Original language: English

Production
- Executive producers: Stephen Davis; Meghan McCarthy; Kirsten Newlands; Sarah Wall
- Producers: Angela Belyea; Colleen McAllister
- Editor: Nick Confalone
- Running time: 44 minutes
- Production companies: DHX Media; Hasbro Studios

Original release
- Network: Discovery Family
- Release: July 6, 2018

My Little Pony: Equestria Girls – Rollercoaster of Friendship is a 2018 animated television special within Hasbro's My Little Pony: Equestria Girls franchise, itself a spin-off of the 2010 relaunch of the My Little Pony toy line. The special was directed by Ishi Rudell and Katrina Hadley, written and edited by Nick Confalone, and produced by DHX Media Vancouver for Hasbro Studios in the United States.

Premiered on Discovery Family (a joint venture between Discovery, Inc. and Hasbro) on July 6, 2018, it is the second one-hour Equestria Girls special, following Forgotten Friendship (released earlier in February) and preceding Spring Breakdown, Sunset's Backstage Pass, and Holidays Unwrapped (all 2019).

== Plot ==
Rarity takes a summer job as a costume designer for a new amusement park, Equestria Land. Meanwhile, the chief costume designer and Equestria Land's public relations manager, Vignette Valencia, is once seen trying to have a salad, and when she tries to post a picture on social media, her smartphone sucks the salad into it, having been enchanted with stray Equestrian magic. Vignette wonders how it is possible, and thinks it is a new application. Rarity meets Vignette and designs costumes for a special parade at the amusement park. On the day of the parade, she invites her friends, Applejack, Rainbow Dash, Pinkie Pie, Fluttershy, Sunset Shimmer and Twilight Sparkle. Vignette then decides to put up the Rainbooms on the parade.

When Fluttershy and Rainbow Dash meet with Vignette, Vignette puts up her suggestion on their looks for the parade, but they disapprove and are teleported into the phone unexpectedly by Vignette. The two end up in a white place with the salad that Vignette sucked up in the beginning. Applejack looks for Fluttershy, but cannot find either of them. Applejack then sees footage that exposes Vignette's true colors to her. She now looks for Rarity to warn her about Vignette but she does not believe her, which turns into a confrontation after Vignette denies any sort of such magical incidents, upsetting them both. In the mean time, she teleports Pinkie Pie, Sunset and Twilight when they disapprove of some over-the-top looks. They are all locked in the white place and meet Rainbow Dash and Fluttershy, sharing each other's stories and trying to get out. Vignette prepares for the parade by projecting fake versions of the Rainbooms and designing them the way she wants. She then reveals her plan to Rarity and tries to teleport her when she angrily demands Vignette to somehow give her her friends back, but gets away.

Rarity finds Applejack and tells her that they cannot let Vignette perform at the cost of losing their friends. They call their friends, and when Applejack opens a door, they find her friends trapped in a room in the park. Believing Vignette will teleport anything she does not like into the room, they head to the parade to stop her. The Rainbooms use their magic to transform, defeat Vignette, and destroy her phone. Vignette feels devastated, and tells that she did this because she had the philosophy of "BYBB" ("Be Yourself But Better"). Vignette then reveals that despite having so many fans, she does not have any friends. Rarity and Applejack offer her genuine friendship, and the group performs a lively show at the parade, set to a montage of them playing at the amusement park.

== Cast ==
- Tabitha St. Germain as Rarity
- Ashleigh Ball as Applejack and Rainbow Dash
- Rebecca Shoichet as Sunset Shimmer, Costume Designer in a special appearance in the song "Photo Booth"
- Tara Strong as Twilight Sparkle
- Andrea Libman as Pinkie Pie and Fluttershy
- Tegan Moss as Vignette Valencia
- James Kirk as Micro Chips
- Sam Vincent as Flim
- Scott McNeil as Flam
- Richard Newman as Security Guard

=== Featured Singers ===
- Kazumi Evans as Rarity
- Rebecca Shoichet as Twilight Sparkle

== Release ==
Rollercoaster of Friendship premiered on Discovery Family (a joint venture between Discovery, Inc. and Hasbro) as part of its "Summer Surprises" programming block on July 6, 2018.

=== Home media and streaming ===
On YouTube, Hasbro's official channel released the special in five parts. Its first episode was uploaded on August 31, 2018 and its last episode on September 28. On October 1, 2018, the special was made available for streaming on Netflix in the United States alongside Forgotten Friendship.

Bundled with Forgotten Friendship, the special was also released on DVD on November 1, 2018 in the United Kingdom.
