= Sunset Shimmer =

Fictional character from My Little Pony

- My Little Pony character
- Sunset Shimmer's human form in "A Fine Line"
- First appearance: My Little Pony: Equestria Girls (2013)
- Created by: Meghan McCarthy
- Voiced by: Rebecca Shoichet

In-universe information
- Aliases: Daydream Shimmer (angel form); Sunset Satan (demon form)
- Nicknames: Bacon Hair (fandom); SunShim; Sunset
- Species: Unicorn (Equestria); Human (human world)
- Title: Element of Empathy
- Occupation: Princess Celestia’s student (formerly); Student at Canterlot High School; Leader of the Equestria Girls; Rhythm guitarist for the Rainbooms
- Affiliation: Canterlot High School; The Rainbooms; Twilight Sparkle; Princess Celestia; Spike
- Significant other: Flash Sentry (ex-boyfriend)

Sunset Shimmer is a fictional character who appears in the fourth incarnation of Hasbro's My Little Pony toyline and media franchise, beginning with My Little Pony: Equestria Girls (2013). She serves as the main antagonist of the first Equestria Girls film before becoming a main protagonist throughout the spin-off franchise. She is voiced by Rebecca Shoichet, who also provides the singing voice of Twilight Sparkle.

Sunset Shimmer is depicted as a former anthropomorphic unicorn from Equestria who becomes human after traveling through a magic mirror to the human world. Originally Princess Celestia's student before Twilight Sparkle, she abandons her studies in pursuit of power and crossed into the human world, where she becomes a student at Canterlot High School.

== Appearances ==
=== Fourth My Little Pony incarnation (2010–2021) ===
Sunset Shimmer's original unicorn form in My Little Pony Equestria Girls - Forgotten Friendship.

==== My Little Pony: Equestria Girls ====
Sunset Shimmer first appears as the main antagonist in the inaugural Equestria Girls film. She is introduced as Princess Celestia's former student before Twilight Sparkle who turned cruel and dishonest and eventually abandoned her studies and disappearing into the human world. At the beginning of the film, she steals Twilight's crown containing the Element of Magic, prompting Twilight and Spike to follow her through the magic mirror into the human world where they transform into a human teenaged girl and a dog, respectively. Sunset is shown to be a student at Canterlot High School and the ex-girlfriend of Flash Sentry, where she rules through intimidation and manipulation, and is assisted by the human counterparts of Snips and Snails. Her ultimate goal is to use the Element of Magic to create an army and conquer Equestria. During the film's climax, she transforms into a monster corrupted by the magic of Twilight's crown and is eventually defeated and reformed by Twilight and her new human friends.

Sunset becomes a main character in the Equestria Girls franchise in subsequent media. In the second film, she is shown to now be ostracized by the other students save for the human counterparts of Twilight's friends. She uses a magic book that she had used to communicate with Princess Celestia when she was her student to warn Princess Twilight of the emergence of the Dazzlings, who can use their magical voices to brainwash others. After Twilight and Spike returns to the human world, Sunset reassures Twilight as she tries to write a counter-spell to break the Dazzlings' mind control spell over the school, and also expresses disappointment that she was not invited to join the Rainbooms, her friends' rock band participating in the Battle of the Bands. At the end of the film, she helps the Rainbooms defeat the Dazzlings and free the school from their spell, and is recruited to join the Rainbooms as the band's rhythm guitarist and keeps in touch with Twilight with her magic book.

Sunset is the main protagonist of the third film, in which she participates in the Friendship Games competition as one of the Canterlot High School Wondercolts. Tasked with keeping magic out of the games to prevent accusations of cheating, she becomes suspicious of Twilight Sparkle's human world counterpart, who is a member of the rival Crystal Prep Academy Shadowbolts team and has been inadvertently draining Equestrian magic from her human friends. During the climax of the film, Sunset defeats and reforms Twilight when she transforms into a monster corrupted by Equestrian magic, in a role reversal of the first film, who then also becomes a main character alongside Sunset and her friends.

In the fourth film, Sunset takes part in the school field trip to Camp Everfree where she is assigned to the same tent as Twilight Sparkle. When mysterious events begin happening at the camp, she becomes suspicious of Timber Spruce, one of the camp counselors and Twilight's new love interest, whom she suspects of attempting to scare away the campers using the legend of Gaia Everfree to force his sister, Gloriosa Daisy, to sell the camp. Later, she obtains the ability to read the minds of others through physical touch, and learns that Gloriosa is the one causing the mysterious events at the camp. Sunset, Twilight and their friends harness the power of magical geodes to defeat Gloriosa when she transforms into a monster corrupted by Equestrian magic, after which they help organize a fundraiser that saves the camp from closing.

In the special My Little Pony: Equestria Girls – Forgotten Friendship, Sunset, while working as president of the school yearbook committee, suddenly becomes the object of ostracization again by the rest of the CHS student body, including the rest of the Equestria Girls. She returns to Equestria and reconciles with Princess Celestia who helps her and Princess Twilight research the Equestrian magic responsible, eventually learning that the memory stone, an ancient Equestrian artefact capable of erasing memories is responsible. Upon returning to the human world, Sunset works with Trixie's human counterpart to help find the memory stone, and eventually, the memory stone is destroyed and the memories of the school are restored.

Sunset also prominently appears in other Equestria Girls media, including the 2017 television specials, the Summertime Shorts, the web series, and in all other Equestria Girls specials, most notably My Little Pony: Equestria Girls – Spring Breakdown and My Little Pony: Equestria Girls – Sunset's Backstage Pass.

== Development ==
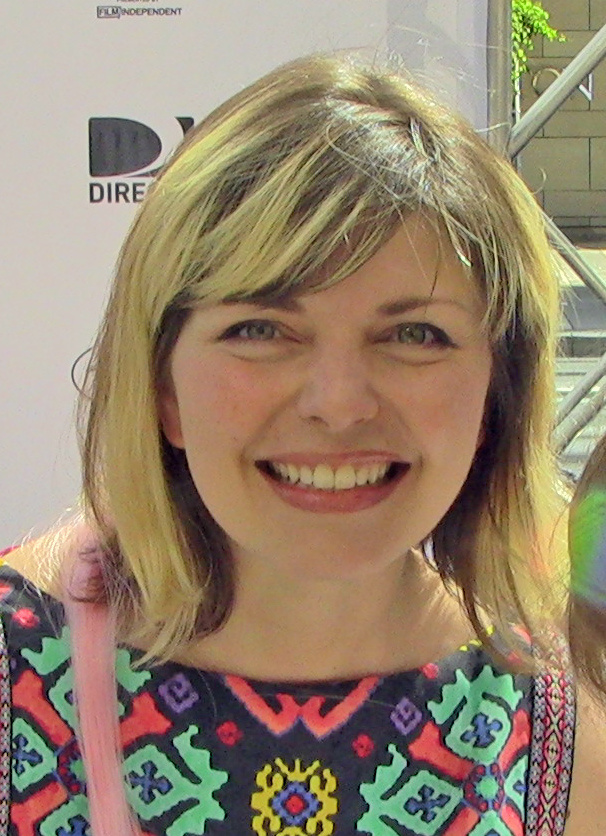
Rebecca Shoichet provided the voice of Sunset Shimmer.

In March 2013, series developer Meghan McCarthy stated that Sunset Shimmer would not be featured as a storyline in the fourth season of Friendship is Magic. In a series of tweets in April 2015, Equestria Girls director Ishi Rudell wrote that Sunset Shimmer's phoenix-like appearance at the end of "My Past is Not Today" was a visual metaphor, and that "her hair is lighter... We wanted to tone her color intensity down a bit with the design of her new outfit." When asked on Twitter in mid-December 2016 if Sunset is one of the Elements of Harmony, Ishi Rudell replied, "In our world she is the 7th element! ☀️" later specifying said element to be "empathy". According to Katrina Hadley, Sunset's aura color was changed from cyan to red in Mirror Magic as a reflection of her redemption and the colors for when she ponied up in Rainbow Rocks. Katrina Hadley calls Sunset Shimmer's glowing eyes whenever she uses her magic geode powers an "empathy flash".

== Reception and analysis ==
Author Jen A. Blue wrote that Sunset Shimmer serves as a deliberate mirror to Twilight Sparkle: both characters share similar backgrounds as unicorns gifted at magic and former protégées of Princess Celestia. Blue analyzed Sunset Shimmer's role as the creator of artificial cliques at Canterlot High School, and wrote that she functions as "an outside force, a manipulator seeking control" who divides the human versions of the Mane Six and establishes rigid social divisions that were "diabolical in origin." According to Blue, Sunset Shimmer's reformation through the Elements of Harmony is similar to Princess Luna's healing in the series premiere, as the Elements "heal her, bringing her to her original state" rather than punish her. Blue observed that in Rainbow Rocks, Sunset Shimmer becomes the true protagonist and experiences a character arc focused on guilt, redemption, and belonging as she learns "that while she has done terrible things in the past, and both her guilt and the anger of the people around her are legitimate, that doesn't mean there aren't still people who care about her." Blue praised the film for walking "a finer line than the show usually walks" in portraying both the legitimacy of others' wariness toward her and her own deserving of friendship and reformation.

Author Sherilyn Connelly wrote that Sunset Shimmer was one of My Little Pony's "most emotionally complex characters." She compared her reformation to Luna's (as Nightmare Moon), and lamented that Sunset will "pay the price for the rest of her life." In what Connelly described as the emotional crux of Rainbow Rocks, a conversation between Twilight and Sunset reveals a shared pressure: Twilight is expected to save the day, a burden she feels is heavier ever since her ascension to princesshood, and Sunset is expected to redeem herself from her past wrongdoings, all while knowing that "others [expect] her to screw up and ruin the day."

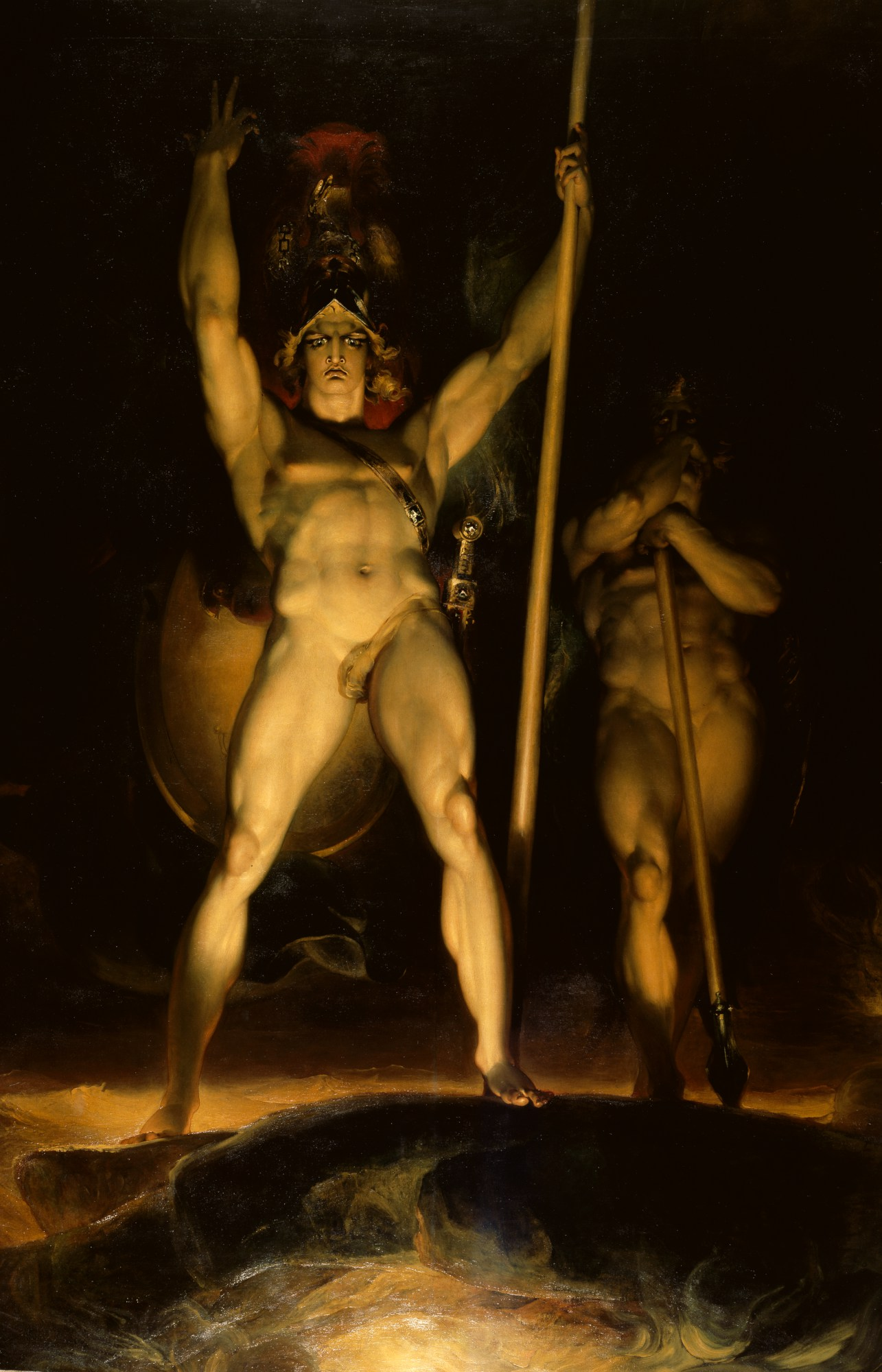
In a queer reimagining of John Milton's epic poem Paradise Lost, analysts compared Sunset Shimmer to Satan (pictured), with Princess Celestia and Twilight Sparkle representing God and Christ, respectively.

In their analysis of Equestria Girls in queer popular culture and its use of John Milton's epic poem Paradise Lost, Melissa Rohrer and Sara Austin wrote that Sunset Shimmer serves as a Satan figure whose backstory parallels Milton's fallen angel: described as once being Princess Celestia's most promising student who was corrupted by greed and power, banished to Earth after failing to overthrow Celestia, and initially planned to use magical elements to corrupt and enslave humanity. Unlike Milton's Satan, Sunset Shimmer demonstrates "self-awareness and repentance that Milton's Satan never achieves," ultimately showing remorse and character growth that allows for her redemption and incorporation into a circle of friendship. Rohrer and Austin wrote that Sunset's character growth allowed her to become a trusted friend and ally throughout the series, as opposed to Satan, who remains unrepentant and irredeemable throughout both Paradise Lost and Paradise Regained. Rohrer and Austin further wrote that the relationship between Sunset Shimmer as Satan and Twilight Sparkle as Christ is a queer reimagining of Paradise Lost, emphasizing "homosocial character development between the Christ and Satan figures that many other adaptations lack." They wrote that Twilight's forgiveness and welcoming of Sunset into friendship, rather than eternal punishment, illustrates what José Esteban Muñoz called a "queer utopia". They described Twilight's "embracing of Sunset Shimmer and her ability to reimagine and remake the world through empathy" as "very queer", wrote that it represented an alternative vision "where egalitarian love and friendship are possible without the tyranny of Heaven."

== In popular culture ==
Sunset Shimmer is a popular character in merchandise and collectibles, with items like the Kotobukiya Bishoujo statue series featuring humanized versions of her character.

== See also ==
- List of My Little Pony: Friendship Is Magic characters
- Twilight Sparkle
- Starlight Glimmer
