= My Little Pony: Equestria Girls – Friendship Games =

2015 animated film by Ishi Rudell and Jayson Thiessen

- Region 1 DVD cover
- Also known as: Friendship Games
- Based on: My Little Pony: Equestria Girls toy line and media franchise by Hasbro
- Written by: Josh Haber
- Directed by: Ishi Rudell; Jayson Thiessen (consulting director)
- Starring: Rebecca Shoichet; Tara Strong; Ashleigh Ball; Andrea Libman; Tabitha St. Germain; Cathy Weseluck; Iris Quinn
- Music by: William Kevin Anderson
- Countries of origin: Canada; United States
- Original language: English

Production
- Producer: Devon Cody
- Editor: Rachel Kenzie
- Running time: 72 minutes (DVD/Blu-ray)
- Production companies: DHX Media; Hasbro Studios

Original release
- Network: Discovery Family; Family Channel
- Release: September 26, 2015

My Little Pony: Equestria Girls – Friendship Games (or simply Friendship Games) is a 2015 animated musical sports fantasy film directed by Ishi Rudell, (Note: Making this the first Equestria Girls film not to be directed by Jayson Thiessen, who was consulting director.) written by Josh Haber, (Note: Making this the first Equestria Girls film not to be written by Meghan McCarthy, who was not involved in making the film.) and produced by DHX Media Vancouver for Hasbro Studios. The sequel to My Little Pony: Equestria Girls – Rainbow Rocks (2014), it is the third installment in Hasbro's Equestria Girls franchise, which serves as a spin-off to the 2010 relaunch of My Little Pony.

Like the previous Equestria Girls films, Friendship Games re-envisions the main characters of the parent franchise, normally ponies, as teenage humanoid characters in a high school setting. Set during the events of the fifth-season finale of Friendship Is Magic, the film centers around a sports competition between the students of Canterlot High School and their rivals at Crystal Prep Academy – one of whom is Twilight Sparkle's parallel universe counterpart, who has been investigating the magical activity around Canterlot High.

My Little Pony: Equestria Girls – Friendship Games had no limited theatrical release in the United States and Canada, apart from a premiere event at Angelika Film Center on September 17, 2015. The film aired on Discovery Family (a joint venture between Discovery Communications and Hasbro) on September 26, with a home media release on October 13 that year by Shout! Factory. It also had a limited theatrical run in the United Kingdom, Mexico and Australia beginning in October 2015. It received mixed reviews from critics. A fourth film, Legend of Everfree, was released on Netflix in 2016.

== Plot ==
The students of Canterlot High School prepare for the Friendship Games, an academic and sporting competition held every four years between their school's team, the Wondercolts, and the undefeated Shadowbolts from Crystal Prep Academy. Sunset Shimmer, who has been observing her friends' magical ability to "pony up" – grow pony-like ears, tails, and wings – whenever they play musical instruments, becomes concerned when Rainbow Dash transforms during a pep rally, seemingly at random. Tasked with finding the cause of this development, Sunset attempts to contact Twilight Sparkle for advice but receives no response.

Meanwhile, one of Crystal Prep's students, Twilight's counterpart in the parallel world, investigates the magical activity surrounding Canterlot High. Twilight builds a locket-like device to detect and contain the magic for further study, hoping this will secure her application for Everton, a coveted independent study program. However, Principal Cinch threatens to revoke the application to blackmail Twilight into participating in the Friendship Games and maintain Crystal Prep's victory record.

Upon Twilight's arrival at Canterlot High, her device detects Sunset and her friends' magic and leads Twilight to them; as she approaches, the device inadvertently absorbs Rarity's magic when she "ponies up" after making uniforms for the other girls. Sunset, initially mistaking Twilight for her Ponyville counterpart, quickly realizes the misunderstanding and considers consulting Twilight in person. When Crystal Prep's Twilight follows her to the portal to Equestria, the device absorbs the portal's magic and seals it off. The device similarly affects Pinkie Pie when she tries to ease the tension with a party and later Fluttershy when she attempts to cheer up a distraught Twilight, creating dimensional rifts to Equestria and giving Twilight's dog Spike the ability to speak.

Following Twilight's victory in the games' academic decathlon, the games continue with a "tri cross relay", a relay race between archery, speed skating and motocross. Applejack transforms after she advises Twilight, causing the device to steal Applejack's magic and create a rift that summons monstrous plants. Rainbow Dash "ponies up" to save the other competitors before losing her magic, allowing Canterlot High to win the event, but causing Cinch to accuse Canterlot High of cheating due to their perceived magical advantage. Frustrated by her failure to keep the magic protected, Sunset furiously berates Twilight for endangering her friends, regretting it when Twilight runs off in tears.

That evening, before the final event, Cinch and the Shadowbolts pressure Twilight into releasing the magic within her device to harness it against the Wondercolts. The magic instead corrupts Twilight, turning her into a evil winged monster (Note: Identified outside the film as "Midnight Sparkle".) who proceeds to destroy the statue portal and open more rifts that threaten to destroy the parallel world. As the Wondercolts and Shadowbolts work together to save their classmates, Sunset notices her friends' magical auras and realizes that their magic manifests when they exhibit the same traits as the Elements of Harmony. Gathering their magic with the device, Sunset assumes an angelic form resembling Princess Celestia, (Note: Identified outside the film as "Daydream Shimmer".) closes the rifts, and returns Twilight to normal.

Refusing to relent from manipulating Twilight, Cinch threatens to report the incident to the school board. When taunted that no one would believe her account of the magical incidents, however, she concedes to a tie that is celebrated by both teams. Reconsidering her Everton application, Twilight realizes she is happier at Canterlot High and transfers there, where Sunset and the other students welcome her as a new friend.

In a pre-credits scene, Ponyville's Twilight emerges from the portal with the counterparts of her friends gathered around it and apologizes for her absence, explaining that how she has just escaped from a time travel loop, (Note: As depicted in the Friendship is Magic fifth season finale "The Cutie Re-Mark".) before gawking at the sight of her counterpart.

== Cast ==
- Rebecca Shoichet as Sunset Shimmer, a Canterlot High School student/Wondercolt who hails as a unicorn from Equestria.
- Tara Strong as Twilight Sparkle, the socially awkward prized student of Crystal Prep Academy (later Canterlot High School) and a member of the Shadowbolts (later the Wondercolts). Strong also voices Twilight's counterpart from Equestria in a post-credits scene.
- Ashleigh Ball as:
  - Rainbow Dash, a competitive athlete/Wondercolt
  - Applejack, an honest country girl/Wondercolt.
- Andrea Libman as:
  - Pinkie Pie, a cheerful, party-obsessed Wondercolt
  - Fluttershy, a kindhearted Wondercolt/animal lover
  - Sweetie Drops, a Wondercolt.
- Tabitha St. Germain as:
  - Rarity, a dressmaker Wondercolt with a generous spirit
  - Vice Principal Luna, Celestia's younger sister.
- Cathy Weseluck as Spike, Twilight's pet dog who gains the ability to speak after exposure to Equestrian magic.
- Iris Quinn as Principal Abacus Cinch, the reputation-obsessed former head of Crystal Prep Academy.
- Sharon Alexander as Sour Sweet, a Shadowbolt who alternates between an obnoxiously nice and ill-tempered personality.
- Sienna Bohn as Sugarcoat, a Shadowbolt who bluntly speaks her mind.
- Kelly Sheridan as Indigo Zap, a hypercompetitive Shadowbolt.
- Britt Irvin as Sunny Flare, a disdainful Shadowbolt.
- Shannon Chan-Kent as Lemon Zest, (Note: Erroneously named as "Lemon Tart" in the film's end credits.) a Shadowbolt and rock music enthusiast.
- Nicole Oliver as Principal Celestia, the head of Canterlot High School.
- Britt McKillip as Dean Cadance, the friendly dean (later Principal) of Crystal Prep Academy.
- Vincent Tong as:
  - Flash Sentry, a Wondercolt who is enamored with Twilight's counterpart in Equestria
  - An unnamed Crystal Prep bus driver.
- Andrew Francis as Shining Armor, a Crystal Prep alumnus, and Twilight's older brother.

=== Singers ===
- Rebecca Shoichet as Twilight Sparkle
- Shannon Chan-Kent as Pinkie Pie
- Kazumi Evans as Rarity

== Production ==
A forest clearing, used both for the Friendship Is Magic episode "Bloom & Gloom" and for this film, was previewed in a background image shown online back in November 2014.

The third installment was first teased by Rainbow Rocks co-director, Ishi Rudell on December 12, 2014. Brony Donald "Dusty Katt" Rhoades asked wondering about Rudell's silence on Twitter, and Rudell replied that he was "too busy working on #3".

On January 29, 2015, Australian home media distributor Beyond International stated via Facebook that they had obtained distribution rights for seasons 4 and 5 of Friendship Is Magic, in addition to Rainbow Rocks and the "third Equestria Girls (film)". Further confirmation was given during Hasbro's investor presentation at the 2015 New York Toy Fair, along with other products in the Friendship Games lineup.

The concept designs for the film's ending credits were done by Katrina Hadley with Chris Lienonin and Jeremy Mah on the layouts.

This was also the first film in the Equestria Girls spinoff franchise not to be directed by Jayson Thiessen and written by Meghan McCarthy (as well as the only one not to involve McCarthy in any way) as they were both busy directing and writing the 2017 theatrical My Little Pony feature film respectively, which was in production at the time, although Thiessen did direct the film's companion shorts and was consulting director on the film itself.

=== Music ===
Like the previous two installments, the songs were composed by Daniel Ingram with lyric writing shared between Ingram and screenwriter Josh Haber; except "Friendship Games", "ACADECA" and "Right There in Front of Me" which had lyrics solely by Ingram. Even though it wasn't listed in Discovery Family's televised broadcast of the film's ending credits, "What More Is Out There?" can be heard in the film. Although "Right There in Front of Me" is listed in the credits, it is absent in Discovery Family's broadcast. Song production was done by Caleb Chan with vocal arrangements by Trevor Hoffman.

- "Friendship Games" – Sunset Shimmer, Applejack, Fluttershy, Pinkie Pie, Rainbow Dash, Rarity, and ensemble (voiceover)
- "CHS Rally Song" – Rainbow Dash and full company
- "What More Is Out There?" – Twilight Sparkle
- "ACADECA" (Academic Decathlon) – Twilight Sparkle, Sunset Shimmer, and full company (voiceover)
- "Unleash the Magic" – Principal Abacus Cinch, Twilight Sparkle, and the students of Crystal Prep Academy
- "End Credits Song: Right There in Front of Me" – Twilight Sparkle, Sunset Shimmer, Applejack, Fluttershy, Pinkie Pie, Rainbow Dash, Rarity, and ensemble (voiceover)

"Right There in Front of Me" plays over the closing credits on the film's DVD and Blu-ray versions. According to Rudell, the song "Dance Magic" is unrelated to the film.

The version as heard in the film.

The original cut of the song, originally conceived as a duet.

One of the deleted scenes included in the Blu-ray and DVD set is an alternate version of the song "What More Is Out There?", featuring both Crystal Prep's Twilight Sparkle and Canterlot High's Sunset Shimmer. The song was originally intended as a duet for the two characters, but due to time constraints and the removal of a subplot involving Sunset questioning if she belonged to the parallel world or Equestria, it was ultimately rewritten as a solo for Twilight.

== Release ==
=== Theatrical ===
The film held a premiere at the Angelika Film Center in New York City on September 17, 2015. William Anderson, Ashleigh Ball, G.M. Berrow, Josh Haber, Daniel Ingram, Brian Lenard, Andrea Libman, Ishi Rudell, Rebecca Shoichet, Tara Strong and Cathy Weseluck, including Sarah Michelle Gellar from Buffy the Vampire Slayer and comedian Jim Gaffigan, were among those in attendance. Also in attendance was The Real Housewives of New York City star Kristen Taekman, Top Chef's Padma Lakshmi, America's Got Talent host Nick Cannon, former New York Giants running back Tiki Barber, fashion photographer Nigel Barker, Sons of Anarchy's Drea de Matteo, and fitness guru Tracy Anderson.

Friendship Games had a limited theatrical release in select Vue Cinemas theaters in the United Kingdom between October 24, and November 1, 2015. The film had a limited theatrical release at various Hoyts theaters in Australia between October 31 and November 10, 2015. In Mexico, the film had a limited theatrical release in various Cinépolis theaters between October 9 and 18, 2015.

=== Television ===
In the United States, the film premiered on Discovery Family (a joint venture between Discovery Communications and Hasbro) on September 26, 2015. On December 24 (Christmas Eve), 2015, the film made its debut in the United Kingdom on Pop.

=== Home media and streaming ===
In the United States and Canada, Shout! Factory released Friendship Games on DVD (Region 1), Blu-ray disc, digital download release, and in a box set alongside its two predecessors on October 13, 2015. DVD and Blu-ray special features consist of four storyboard animatic deleted scenes, audio commentary, sing-alongs, and five animated shorts. Primal Screen released a Region 2 DVD on November 2, 2015, and includes the five animated shorts and a recap of the first two Equestria Girls films.

On November 30, 2015, the My Little Pony Facebook page posted an advertisement promoting that the film will be added to Netflix on December 1, 2015. The version used on Netflix is the same as the one found on the DVD and Blu-ray versions of the film with the end credits song, "Right There in Front of Me", playing over the film's end credits.

== Merchandise and other media ==
The film is a part of the sport-themed Friendship Games lineup, a third installment in the My Little Pony: Equestria Girls toy line and media franchise, which was first displayed at London's 2015 Toy Fair in January, and mentioned with other supporting products, alongside this film, during Hasbro's investor presentation in February that year. LB Kids published a novelization of the film.

=== Animated shorts ===
A series of animated prequel shorts for Friendship Games, similar to those produced for Rainbow Rocks, was announced on February 13, 2015. On July 31, 2015, the My Little Pony Facebook page posted some instructions for playing in the "Friendship Games Fantasy League" and indicated that a new short would be released every Saturday during August 2015. Like the Rainbow Rocks shorts, these are also separate from the film. A total of five shorts were released; the first four of these, paired with a 10-minute preview of the film, aired on Discovery Family on August 29, 2015.

No.	Title	Directed by	Written by	Original release date
1	"The Science of Magic"	Jayson Thiessen	Natasha Levinger	August 1, 2015
Sunset Shimmer studies her friends' pony hybrid transformations to better understand how magic works in the parallel world.
2	"Pinkie Spy"	Jayson Thiessen	Natasha Levinger	August 8, 2015
Rainbow Dash tries to spy on Crystal Prep Academy's sports team, but Pinkie Pie ruins her attempts to remain unseen.
3	"All's Fair in Love & Friendship Games"	Jayson Thiessen	—	August 15, 2015
Lyra Heartstrings (Ashleigh Ball) and Sweetie Drops (Andrea Libman) compete to earn a spot on the Wondercolts team in the Friendship Games tryouts.
4	"Photo Finished"	Jayson Thiessen	Ishi Rudell and Jayson Thiessen	August 22, 2015
Photo Finish (Tabitha St. Germain) gets carried away when Vice Principal Luna asks her to take pictures for the Canterlot High yearbook.
5	"A Banner Day"	Jayson Thiessen	—	August 29, 2015
Flash Sentry, Micro Chips (James Kirk), and Sandalwood (Vincent Tong) have conflicting ideas on their welcome banner for Crystal Prep Academy.

Apart from the shorts above, a Friendship Games "blooper reel" was posted on the official Equestria Girls website on May 3, 2016, containing fictional outtakes of various scenes from the film.

=== Soundtrack ===
The film's soundtrack was released on September 17, 2015 on iTunes Store and on Amazon on September 18, 2015. The first three singles, "Friendship Through the Ages", "My Past is Not Today" and "Life Is a Runway" were first released by Hasbro's YouTube channel on March 31, 2015; later re-uploaded on April 2, 2015.

No.	Title	Writer(s)	Performer(s)	Length
1.	"Friendship Through the Ages"	Daniel Ingram, Katrina Hadley, Brian Lenard, Jayson Thiessen, and Michael Vogel	Rebecca Shoichet, Andrea Libman, Kazumi Evans, Ashleigh Ball, and Shannon Chan-Kent	2:08
2.	"My Past Is Not Today"	Ingram, Hadley, Lenard, Thiessen, and Vogel	Shoichet	2:19
3.	"Life Is a Runway"	Ingram, Hadley, Lenard, Thiessen, and Vogel	Evans	1:58
4.	"Dance Magic"	Ingram	Shoichet, Ball, Chan-Kent, Libman, and Evans	2:04
5.	"The Friendship Games"	Ingram	Shoichet, Ball, Chan-Kent, Libman, Evans, and choir	2:41
6.	"CHS Rally Song"	Josh Haber and Ingram	Ball, chorus	2:30
7.	"What More Is Out There"	Haber and Ingram	Shoichet	2:48
8.	"ACADECA"	Ingram	Full company	2:42
9.	"Unleash the Magic"	Haber and Ingram	Iris Quinn, Shoichet, and choir	3:09
10.	"Right There in Front of Me"	Ingram	Shoichet, Ball, Chan-Kent, Evans, and Libman	2:59
Total length:				25:19

== Reception ==
=== Television viewership ===
When the film premiered on Discovery Family on September 26, 2015, it was viewed by 436,000 viewers. According to the Nielsen ratings, it was watched by approximately 120,000 adults 18-49.

=== Critical response ===
The film received mixed-to-positive reviews from critics. Daniel Alvarez of Unleash the Fanboy gave the film a score of 8 out of 10, calling it "another quality installment in the Equestria Girls series." He praised the film's characters, calling Sunset Shimmer "a great focus", as well as the film's songs and "epic climax." However, he noted that several negatives "hold it back from being near perfect", such as Principal Cinch, whom he called "the worst antagonist." Geekscape's Adam Lemuz praised the film as "a great follow-up to Rainbow Rocks." He further complimented that "fans of the previous films will get a lot of enjoyment out of it as it delivers plenty of solid laughs and noteworthy songs." Ed Liu of Toon Zone (now Anime Superhero) called the film "solid addition to the Equestria Girls franchise", but felt it was "overly familiar" and "a little padded" when comparing it to the first film's story. He also praised Sunset Shimmer's development from "a vintage mean girl to a strong, assertive character in her own right", calling her character arc initiated from the first film "a wonderful long-form story". Mike Cahill of The Guardian gave the film two out of five stars, calling it "craven commercialism", but adding that "it's not unattractively designed, and its peppy collegiate spirit trumps the sappiness of Disney's Tinkerbell spin-offs".
