= My Little Pony: Equestria Girls – Spring Breakdown =

2019 animated television special

- Title card
- Genre: Fantasy; Adventure; Comedy; Drama; Magical girl
- Written by: Nick Confalone
- Directed by: Ishi Rudell; Katrina Hadley
- Starring: Ashleigh Ball; Tara Strong; Rebecca Shoichet; Andrea Libman; Tabitha St. Germain; Cathy Weseluck
- Composers: Matthew Sorensen; William Kevin Anderson; Jessica Vaughn, Jess Furman, and Ethan Roberts (song)
- Countries of origin: United States; Canada
- Original language: English

Production
- Executive producers: Stephen Davis; Meghan McCarthy; Kirsten Newlands; Sarah Wall
- Producers: Angela Belyea; Katherine Crownover; Colleen McAllister
- Editor: Nick Confalone
- Running time: 44 minutes
- Production companies: DHX Media; Allspark Animation

Original release
- Network: Discovery Family
- Release: March 30, 2019

My Little Pony: Equestria Girls – Spring Breakdown is a 2019 animated television special within Hasbro's My Little Pony: Equestria Girls franchise, itself a spin-off of the 2010 relaunch of the My Little Pony toy line. The special was directed by Ishi Rudell and Katrina Hadley, written and edited by Nick Confalone, and produced by DHX Media Vancouver for Allspark Animation (previously Hasbro Studios) in the United States.

Premiered on Discovery Family (a joint venture between Discovery, Inc. and Hasbro) on March 30, 2019, it is the third one-hour Equestria Girls special, following Forgotten Friendship and Rollercoaster of Friendship (both 2018), and preceding Sunset's Backstage Pass and Holidays Unwrapped (released later in July and November, respectively).

== Plot ==
The students of Canterlot High are on a cruise ship, excited for spring break. They all want to relax, except for Rainbow Dash, who's so hyped about their previous battles against evil that she fantasizes about fighting more evil Equestrian magic. The others would rather have a nice, relaxing break, so they split up to pursue their own interests. Rainbow Dash, in her excitement to convince the others to look for danger with her, inadvertently ruins their fun. After a conversation with Trixie, Rainbow Dash gets the idea of attempting to attract danger using the girls' Equestrian magic. She suggests that during the show they were scheduled to put on, they "pony up". Despite this, the others are still not so keen, annoyed at her for ruining their fun. However, during the show, the girls "pony up" anyway. Suddenly, a storm rolls in and a power outage occurs on the whole ship. Rainbow Dash is keen to blame this on evil magic and tries to convince the others to support her search, however, they decide to split up and work rationally.

Rainbow Dash is left alone on the deck and sees a strange light in the ocean. She quickly forces the girls to join her and relays the information to them. However, the girls deny it; more concerned about their own needs,and Twilight and Sunset blinded by arrogance.

The next day, Twilight Sparkle and Sunset Shimmer go to look for Rainbow Dash, only to discover that she has left the cruise on a lifeboat to try and find evil on her own. After telling the others about the situation, Twilight and Sunset decide to follow Rainbow Dash onto a remote island, where they find her stuck in quicksand. While attempting to save her, they are attacked by a plant monster. Sunset senses Equestrian magic in the sand pool and pushes Rainbow Dash under the sand, before jumping in with Twilight. The sand turns out to have been covering a portal to Equestria. Turned into ponies, Sunset and the others sneak into Ponyville to find Princess Twilight Sparkle.

At the same time, Applejack, Fluttershy, Pinkie Pie and Rarity are still on the cruise, trying to survive the storm, until the ship runs aground on a reef near the island. Unaware of the danger their friends are in; Sunset, Twilight and Rainbow Dash are catching up with Princess Twilight, who shows them an artifact from her battle with the Storm King. Rainbow Dash recognizes his symbol as the one she saw in the sea earlier; revealing to Twilight and Sunset now their arrogance and doubt endamgered everyone in the cruise. Realizing the danger their friends are in, Princess Twilight sends them back to the parallel world with the Storm King's staff, which Twilight, Sunset and Rainbow Dash use to get rid of the storm. However, the ship is still sinking and the people on it are still in danger.

The girls reunite and together rescue the people from the cruise, bringing them to the island. Now stranded, Sunset comes up with the idea to bring them all home via the portal to Equestria. Everyone from the cruise, now ponies, enters Princess Twilight's castle and asks for her help.

== Cast ==
- Ashleigh Ball as Rainbow Dash and Applejack
- Rebecca Shoichet as Sunset Shimmer
- Tara Strong as Twilight Sparkle and Princess Twilight Sparkle
- Andrea Libman as Pinkie Pie and Fluttershy
- Tabitha St. Germain as Rarity
- Cathy Weseluck as Spike
- Kathleen Barr as Trixie Lulamoon, Puffed Pastry
- Jason Michas as Ragamuffin

== Production ==
According to co-director Katrina Hadley, Spring Breakdown was split into six parts instead of the usual five from the past two specials, with each part having an approximate runtime of seven minutes and thirty seconds, and that "there will be no cut scenes as each part was timed and cut to be reassembled for broadcast on TV without losing any content."

== Marketing ==
A teaser trailer for the special was shown at the 2018 My Little Pony San Diego Comic-Con panel.

== Release ==
Spring Breakdown premiered on Discovery Family (a joint venture between Discovery, Inc. and Hasbro) on March 30, 2019. On YouTube, My Little Pony's official channel has uploaded the special into six parts. Its first episode was uploaded on April 12, 2019 and its last episode on May 17.
