= Meghan McCarthy =

American screenwriter

- Occupations: Writer; producer; lyricist
- Years active: 2004–present

Meghan McCarthy is an American screenwriter, lyricist, film and television producer, and creative executive best known as the showrunner of the animated television show My Little Pony: Friendship Is Magic. She is also known for her work on Class of 3000 and Fish Hooks. Since June 2015, she has been the Head of Storytelling for the entire My Little Pony and Littlest Pet Shop brands, helping to "create expansive worlds and characters".

McCarthy was a part of the original Friendship Is Magic crew, and was promoted as showrunner and story editor during season 2 after the departure of series creator and previous showrunner Lauren Faust. Overall, she was directly involved in the writing of 35 episodes, and wrote the lyrics of 25 songs featured in the show; she also wrote the screenplays and lyrics of the spin-off films My Little Pony: Equestria Girls and My Little Pony: Equestria Girls – Rainbow Rocks, and My Little Pony: The Movie.

== Career ==
In October 2010, she was invited by Lauren Faust, the co-creator and producer for Foster's Home for Imaginary Friends, to help write on Hasbro's television revival of its My Little Pony franchise. McCarthy, on a writing hiatus at the time, was inspired to accept by Faust's dedication and the strong female characterization she had presented. In 2011, Faust left the show after the two-part season two premiere, and McCarthy was promoted to co-executive producer for its third season onward; she also served as the show's story editor. In early June 2015, Hasbro promoted McCarthy to become the company's new "Head of Storytelling" for their brands, My Little Pony and Littlest Pet Shop; her role will be to help "create expansive worlds and characters" across these brands, according to Hasbro's executive vice president Stephen Davis.

In addition, McCarthy has written and helped produce the spin-off films, My Little Pony: Equestria Girls and its sequel. She was nominated for a Daytime Emmy for "Outstanding Original Song - Children's and Animation" for her lyrics in the Friendship Is Magic episode "Sweet and Elite".

On November 3, 2017, Hasbro Studios and Paramount extended their relationship with an exclusive five year production deal for Allspark Pictures and Allspark Animation for original and toy based films. Both Allspark units are newly formed (Allspark Pictures formerly was a financing label) with the film unit head by Greg Mooradian and the animation unit head by Meghan McCarthy. Paramount and Hasbro would also work together on TV series. Following Hasbro’s purchase of Entertainment One in 2019, though, Allspark would later close down and be absorbed into the newly-acquired production company.

== Filmography ==
=== Television ===
Year	Title	Writer	Co-executive producer	Lyricist	Notes
2004–2006	Foster's Home for Imaginary Friends	Yes	No	No	
2006–2007	Class of 3000	Yes	No	No	Also staff writer and story editor Wrote 6 episodes
2010–2019	My Little Pony: Friendship Is Magic	Yes	Yes	Yes	Writer from 2010-2016; Showrunner from 2012-2016; Story editor from 2012-2015; Co-executive producer from 2013-2015 and 2018–2019; Wrote 35 episodes, 25 songs
2011–2013	Fish Hooks	Story	No	No	27 episodes
2017–2019	My Little Pony: Equestria Girls	No	Yes	No	
2018–2019	Littlest Pet Shop: A World of Our Own	No	Yes	No	
2018	My Little Pony: Equestria Girls – Forgotten Friendship	No	Yes	No	
2018	My Little Pony: Equestria Girls – Rollercoaster of Friendship	No	Yes	No	
2018	My Little Pony: Best Gift Ever	No	Yes	No	
2019–2021	Transformers: Rescue Bots Academy	No	Yes	No	
2019	My Little Pony: Equestria Girls – Spring Breakdown	No	Yes	No	
2019	My Little Pony: Rainbow Roadtrip	No	Yes	No	
2019	My Little Pony: Equestria Girls – Sunset's Backstage Pass	No	Yes	No	
2021	Centaurworld	Yes	No	No	Story editor
2025	Bearbrick	Yes	Yes	No	Writer; Showrunner executive producer

==== Friendship Is Magic detailed writing credits ====
Year	Season	Episode
2010	1	"Dragonshy"
2011	1	"Call of the Cutie"
2011	1	"Green Isn't Your Color"
2011	1	"Party of One"
2011	2	"Lesson Zero"
2011	2	"Sweet and Elite"
2012	2	"Hearts and Hooves Day"
2012	2	"A Canterlot Wedding" (Part 1)
2012	2	"A Canterlot Wedding" (Part 2)
2012	3	"The Crystal Empire" (Part 1)
2012	3	"The Crystal Empire" (Part 2)
2013	4	"Princess Twilight Sparkle" (Part 1)
2013	4	"Princess Twilight Sparkle" (Part 2)
2013	4	"Power Ponies"
2014	4	"Three's a Crowd"
2014	4	"Inspiration Manifestation"
2014	4	"Twilight's Kingdom" (Part 1)
2014	4	'Twilight's Kingdom" (Part 2)
2015	5	"The Cutie Map" (Part 1)
2015	5	"The Cutie Map" (Part 2)
2015	5	"Rarity Investigates!"
2016	6	"Flutter Brutter"
2016	6	"28 Pranks Later"
2016	6	"The Fault in Our Cutie Marks"
2016	6	"Where the Apple Lies"
2016	6	"Top Bolt"

=== Film ===
Year	Title	Writer	Executive producer	Lyricist	Notes
2013	My Little Pony: Equestria Girls	Yes	Co-executive producer	Yes	Wrote 3 songs
2014	My Little Pony: Equestria Girls – Rainbow Rocks	Yes	Co-executive producer	Yes	Wrote 8 songs
2016	My Little Pony: Equestria Girls – Legend of Everfree	No	Co-executive producer	No	
2017	My Little Pony: The Movie	Yes	Yes	Yes	Wrote the song "Open Up Your Eyes"
2021	My Little Pony: A New Generation	No	Yes	No	

=== My Little Pony lyric credits ===
Year	Song	Episode/film
2010	"Hop Skip and Jump"	"Dragonshy"
2011	"Cupcake Song"	"Call of the Cutie"
2011	"Pinkie Pie's Singing Telegram"	"Party of One"
2011	"Becoming Popular (The Pony Everypony Should Know)"	"Sweet and Elite"
2012	"The Perfect Stallion"	"Hearts and Hooves Day"
2012	"B.B.B.F.F."	"A Canterlot Wedding"
2012	"B.B.B.F.F. (Reprise)"	"A Canterlot Wedding"
2012	"This Day Aria"	"A Canterlot Wedding"
2012	"This Day Aria (Reprise)"	"A Canterlot Wedding"
2012	"Love Is in Bloom"	"A Canterlot Wedding"
2012	"The Failure Song"	"The Crystal Empire"
2012	"The Ballad of the Crystal Empire"	"The Crystal Empire"
2012	"The Success Song"	"The Crystal Empire"
2013	"Equestria Girls"	Equestria Girls
2013	"Time to Come Together"	Equestria Girls
2013	"This Is Our Big Night"	Equestria Girls
2014	"You'll Play Your Part"	"Twilight's Kingdom"
2014	"Let the Rainbow Remind You"	"Twilight's Kingdom"
2014	"Better Than Ever"	Rainbow Rocks
2014	"Battle"	Rainbow Rocks
2014	"Bad Counter Spell"	Rainbow Rocks
2014	"Under Our Spell"	Rainbow Rocks
2014	"Tricks Up My Sleeve"	Rainbow Rocks
2014	"Awesome as I Wanna Be"	Rainbow Rocks
2014	"Welcome to the Show"	Rainbow Rocks
2017	"Open Up Your Eyes"	My Little Pony: The Movie
