= My Little Pony: Friendship Is Magic discography =

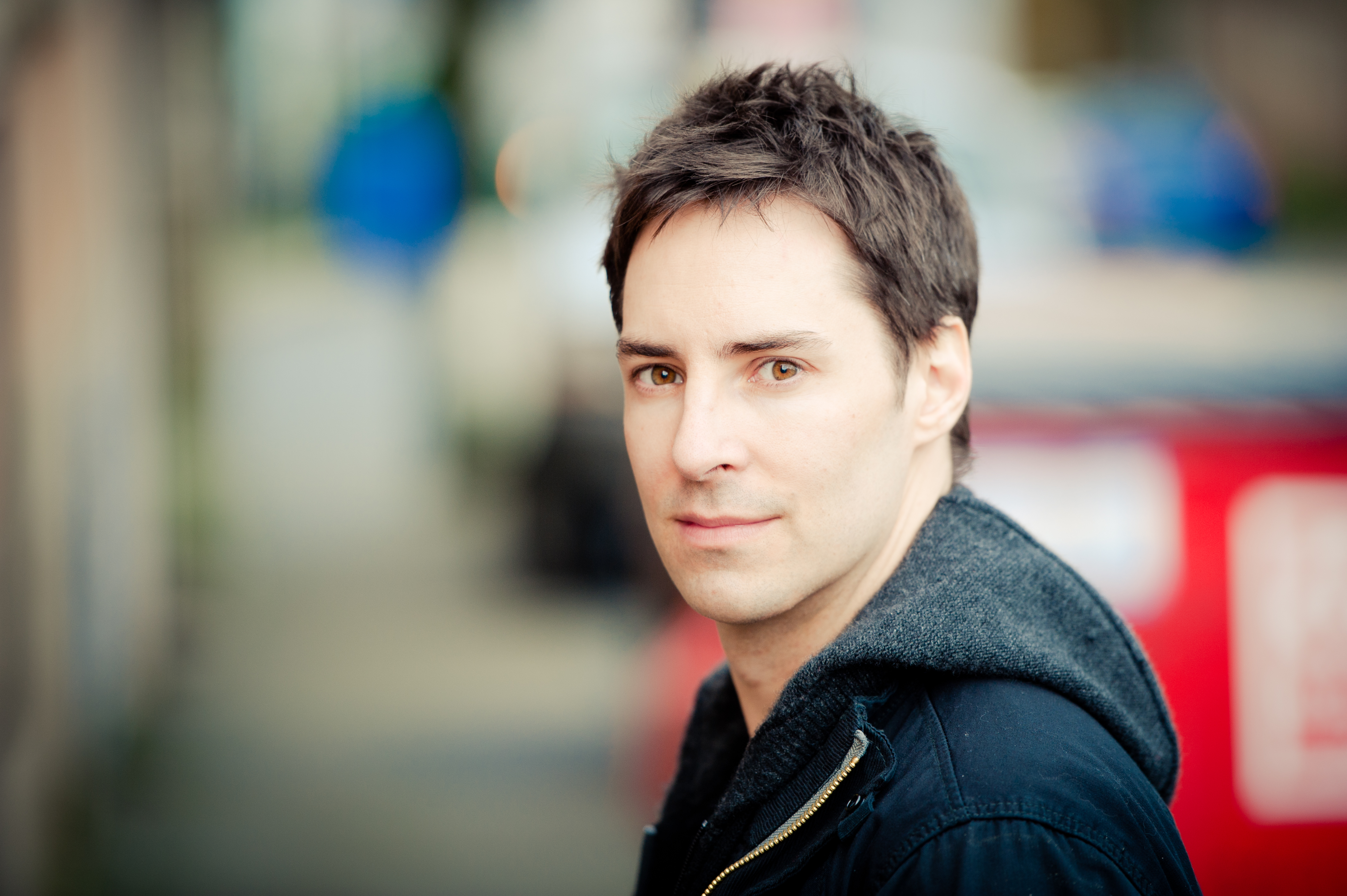
Daniel Ingram, the composer of almost all of the songs featured in My Little Pony: Friendship is Magic.

My Little Pony: Friendship Is Magic is an animated children's television series based on the My Little Pony toyline, created by American toy and game manufacturer Hasbro. The show also has musical elements, featuring songs performed on-screen by its characters in several episodes.

Overall, the series has featured 108 original songs over the course of its nine seasons, not including its main theme "Friendship Is Magic" and the songs from its 2017 film My Little Pony: The Movie. Almost all songs featured in the show were composed by Daniel Ingram (pictured). He also became the show's main lyricist starting with season two; other notable lyricists include Amy Keating Rogers, M.A. Larson and the series' showrunner Meghan McCarthy. Lyrics are often written or co-written by the screenwriter of the episode they are featured in.

== TV series ==
=== Season 1 (2010–11) ===
#	Title	Episode	Music	Lyrics	Performer (character)^{1}	Backing vocals	Context
0	Theme song	All	Daniel Ingram	Lauren Faust	Rebecca Shoichet (Twilight Sparkle)	-	Theme song of the show
1	"The Laughter Song"	"Friendship Is Magic" (Note: Listed as "Elements of Harmony" on Hasbro's website.) (Part 2)	Daniel Ingram	Lauren Faust	Shannon Chan-Kent (Pinkie Pie)	-	As Twilight, Applejack, Rarity, Fluttershy, and Rainbow Dash are terrified of the Everfree forest, Pinkie Pie convinces them to laugh at scary things instead.
2	"Pinkie's Gala Fantasy Song"	"The Ticket Master"	Daniel Ingram	Lauren Faust	Shannon Chan-Kent (Pinkie Pie)	-	Pinkie Pie fantasizes about the upcoming Grand Galloping Gala.
3	"The Ticket Song"	"The Ticket Master"	Daniel Ingram	Lauren Faust	Shannon Chan-Kent (Pinkie Pie)	Tara Strong (Twilight Sparkle)^{2}	Pinkie Pie attempts to convince Twilight to give her an extra ticket to the Grand Galloping Gala.
4	"Hop Skip and Jump Song"	"Dragonshy"	William Anderson	Meghan McCarthy	Andrea Libman (Pinkie Pie)^{2}	-	Pinkie Pie attempts to encourage Fluttershy to jump over a gulf.
5	"Evil Enchantress Song"	"Bridle Gossip"	William Anderson	Amy Keating Rogers	Libman (Pinkie Pie),^{2} Blu Mankuma (Fluttershy)	-	Pinkie Pie sings a song about the infamous Zecora. Later in the episode, she is unable to speak due to a magical plant and makes Fluttershy (who now has a deep, masculine voice due to the same plant) sing it for her.
6	"Winter Wrap Up"	"Winter Wrap Up"	Daniel Ingram	Cindy Morrow	Ashleigh Ball (Rainbow Dash, Applejack), Chan-Kent (Pinkie Pie), Kazumi Evans (Rarity), Rebecca Shoichet (Twilight Sparkle), Libman (Fluttershy)	Ensemble (Ponyville)	Ponyville prepares for their annual Winter Wrap Up and the upcoming arrival of spring.
7	"Cupcake Song"	"Call of the Cutie"	Daniel Ingram	Meghan McCarthy	Chan-Kent (Pinkie Pie)	-	Pinkie Pie teaches Apple Bloom how to make cupcakes.
8	"Art of the Dress"	"Suited for Success"	Daniel Ingram	Charlotte Fullerton	Evans (Rarity)	Shoichet (Twilight Sparkle), Libman (Pinkie Pie, Fluttershy), Ball (Rainbow Dash, Applejack)	Rarity makes dresses for the rest of the Mane Six. In a reprise later in the episode, she has trouble keeping up with their demands.
9	"Hush Now Lullaby"	"Stare Master"	Daniel Ingram	Chris Savino	Libman (Fluttershy); Michelle Creber (Sweetie Belle)	Shoichet^{3}	Fluttershy sings a lullaby to the Cutie Mark Crusaders to help them fall asleep. Afterwards, Sweetie Belle sings an extremely loud and energetic reprise.
10	"Cutie Mark Crusaders Song"	"The Show Stoppers"	Daniel Ingram	Cindy Morrow	Madeleine Peters (Scootaloo)	Creber (Apple Bloom, Sweetie Belle)	The Crusaders perform a musical number for the audience, during which everything goes wrong. (re-titled "The Cutie Mark Crusaders Anthem" in some releases.)
11	"You Got to Share, You Got to Care"	"Over a Barrel"	Daniel Ingram	Dave Polsky	Chan-Kent (Pinkie Pie)	-	Pinkie Pie sings to try to convince the inhabitants of Appleloosa and their enemies, a buffalo herd, to be friends.
12	"So Many Wonders"	"The Cutie Mark Chronicles"	Daniel Ingram	M.A. Larson	Libman (Fluttershy)	-	A young Fluttershy discovers animals for the first time.
13	"Pinkie Pie's Singing Telegram"	"Party of One"	Daniel Ingram	Meghan McCarthy	Chan-Kent (Pinkie Pie)	-	Pinkie Pie invites the rest of the Mane Six to her pet alligator Gummy's birthday.
14	"At the Gala"	"The Best Night Ever"	Daniel Ingram	Amy Keating Rogers	Shoichet (Twilight Sparkle), Libman (Fluttershy), Ball (Rainbow Dash, Applejack), Evans (Rarity), Chan-Kent (Pinkie Pie)	The Cypress Singers (Gala guests)	The Mane Six each describe their expectations and intentions at the Grand Galloping Gala.
15	"I'm at the Grand Galloping Gala"	"The Best Night Ever"	Traditional, William Anderson	Amy Keating Rogers	Chan-Kent (Pinkie Pie)	-	Pinkie sings her joy to be at the Grand Galoping Gala. (Based on "For He's a Jolly Good Fellow" and "The Bear Went Over the Mountain")
16	"Pony Pokey"	"The Best Night Ever"	Daniel Ingram, William Anderson	Amy Keating Rogers	Chan-Kent (Pinkie Pie)	-	Pinkie Pie tries to brighten the mood at the Grand Galoping Gala, while the rest of the Mane Six each encounter their own problems. (Based on "hokey pokey")

^{1}In case of several characters providing lead vocals, the performers are listed in the order in which their characters (of the first of their characters in case they voice several) start singing.
^{2}Not the person usually voicing the character in songs; those are spoken vocals.
^{3}The singer is not portraying a character.

=== Season 2 (2011–12) ===
#	Title	Episode	Music	Lyrics	Performer (character)^{1}	Backing vocals	Context
18	"Find a Pet Song"	"May the Best Pet Win!"	Daniel Ingram	Charlotte Fullerton, Kevin Rubio	Libman (Fluttershy), Ball (Rainbow Dash)	-	Fluttershy tries to find Rainbow Dash a pet animal. Although unconvinced at first, Rainbow Dash soon becomes overwhelmed with the possibilities to which she decides to organize a race to determine which will become her pet.
19	"Becoming Popular (The Pony Everypony Should Know)"	"Sweet and Elite"	Daniel Ingram	Meghan McCarthy, Daniel Ingram	Evans (Rarity)	Rebecca Lam^{3}	Rarity sings about how she wants to become popular and famous in Canterlot.
20	"The Heart Carol"	"Hearth's Warming Eve"	Daniel Ingram	Merriwether Williams	Choir (Twilight Sparkle, Rainbow Dash, Applejack, Pinkie Pie, Rarity, Fluttershy, Spike, Apple Bloom, Sweetie Belle, Scootaloo)^{4}		The characters present a play on the origins of Hearth's Warming Eve.
21	"Happy Monthiversary"	"Baby Cakes"	Daniel Ingram	Charlotte Fullerton	Libman (Pinkie Pie)	-	Pinkie Pie celebrates the baby Cakes' one-month anniversary.
22	"Piggy Dance"	"Baby Cakes"	Daniel Ingram	Amy Keating Rogers	Chan-Kent	-	Pinkie Pie attempts to entertain the baby Cakes.
23	"The Flim Flam Brothers"	"The Super Speedy Cider Squeezy 6000"	Daniel Ingram	Daniel Ingram, M.A. Larson	Samuel Vincent (Flim), Scott McNeil (Flam), Tabitha St. Germain (Granny Smith)	Crowd (choir)	The Film Fram Brothers present their invention, the Super Speedy Cider Squeezy 6000, to the parched populace of Ponyville, but Granny Smith doubts it.
24	"The Perfect Stallion"	"Hearts and Hooves Day"	Daniel Ingram	Meghan McCarthy	Creber (Apple Bloom, Sweetie Belle), Peters (Scootaloo)	-	The Cutie Mark Crusaders try to find a boyfriend for their teacher Cheerilee.
25	"Smile Song"	"A Friend in Deed"	Daniel Ingram	Amy Keating Rogers	Chan-Kent (Pinkie Pie)	Ensemble (Ponyville)	Pinkie Pie sings about how much she loves to make others happy.
26	"Cranky Doodle Donkey"	"A Friend in Deed"	Traditional, Daniel Ingram	Daniel Ingram, Amy Keating Rogers	Libman (Pinkie Pie)	-	Pinkie attempts to befriend Cranky Doodle Donkey. (based on "Yankee Doodle")
27	"Welcome Song"	"A Friend in Deed"	Daniel Ingram	Amy Keating Rogers	Libman (Pinkie Pie)	-	Pinkie officially welcomes Cranky to Ponyville.
28	"Cranky Doodle Joy"	"A Friend in Deed"	Traditional, Daniel Ingram, George M. Cohan	Amy Keating Rogers	Libman (Pinkie Pie)	Richard Newman (Craky Doodle Donkey), Brenda Crichlow (Matilda)	Pinkie rejoices as she is able to help Cranky. (based on "Yankee Doodle" and "The Yankee Doodle Boy")
29	"B.B.B.F.F."	"A Canterlot Wedding"	Daniel Ingram	Meghan McCarthy	Shoichet (Twilight Sparkle)	Ball (Rainbow Dash, Applejack), Chan-Kent (Pinkie Pie), Evans (Rarity), Libman (Fluttershy)	Twilight sings about her older brother Shining Armor, her former "BBBFF" (Big Brother Best Friend Forever). In a reprise later in the episode, she despairs over their damaged relationship after she chases his suspected evil bride away.
30	"This Day Aria, Part 1"	"A Canterlot Wedding"	Daniel Ingram	Daniel Ingram, Meghan McCarthy	Britt McKillip (Princess Cadance, Queen Chrysalis)	-	Disguised as Cadance, Chrysalis plots her evil intentions for Shining Armor during their wedding, while the real Cadance fears she may not save her groom.
31	"This Day Aria, Part 2"	"A Canterlot Wedding"	Daniel Ingram	Meghan McCarthy	Kathleen Barr (Queen Chrysalis)	-	Chrysalis, now in her true form, rejoices about her absolute victory.
32	"Love Is in Bloom"	"A Canterlot Wedding"	Daniel Ingram	Meghan McCarthy	Shoichet (Twilight Sparkle)	-	Having saved the day, the characters enjoy the wedding reception of Cadance and Shining Armor.

^{1}In case of several characters providing lead vocals, the performers are listed in the order in which their characters (of the first of their characters in case they voice several) start singing.
^{3}The singer is not portraying a character.
^{4}As the song only features several characters singing in harmony, there are no lead vocals per se.

=== Season 3 (2012–13) ===
#	Title	Episode	Music	Lyrics	Performer (character)^{1}	Backing vocals	Context
33	"The Failure Song"	"The Crystal Empire"	Daniel Ingram	Meghan McCarthy	Shoichet (Twilight Sparkle), Cathy Weseluck (Spike)	-	Twilight fears that she may not be prepared for the upcoming challenge Celestia has assigned her.
34	"The Ballad of the Crystal Empire"	"The Crystal Empire"	Daniel Ingram	Meghan McCarthy	Shoichet (Twilight Sparkle), Ball (Rainbow Dash, Applejack), Evans (Rarity), Libman (Fluttershy), Chan-Kent (Pinkie Pie)	Weseluck (Spike)	The Mane Six study the history of the Crystal Empire in order to find a way to save it.
35	"The Success Song"	"The Crystal Empire"	Daniel Ingram	Meghan McCarthy	Shoichet (Twilight Sparkle), Ball (Rainbow Dash, Applejack), Evans (Rarity), Libman (Fluttershy), Chan-Kent (Pinkie Pie)	Weseluck (Spike)	The Mane Six rejoice after Twilight succeeds in her task.
36	"Babs Seed"	"One Bad Apple"	Daniel Ingram	Cindy Morrow, Daniel Ingram	Creber (Apple Bloom, Sweetie Belle), Peters (Scootaloo)	-	The Cutie Mark Crusaders are worried about Babs Seed, who is constantly bullying them.
37	"Raise This Barn"	"Apple Family Reunion"	Daniel Ingram	Cindy Morrow	Ball (Applejack), Creber (Apple Bloom)	St. Germain (Granny Smith), UBC Singers (Apple Family)	The Apple family works together to fix Applejack's barn.
38	"Morning in Ponyville"	"Magical Mystery Cure"	Daniel Ingram	M.A. Larson	Shoichet (Twilight Sparkle)	-	Twilight awakens in the morning and rejoices, confident that everything is and will be fine in Ponyville.
39	"What My Cutie Mark Is Telling Me"	"Magical Mystery Cure"	Daniel Ingram	M.A. Larson, Daniel Ingram	Ball (Rainbow Dash, Applejack), Libman (Fluttershy), Chan-Kent (Pinkie Pie), Evans (Rarity)	-	Twilight runs from each of her friends to another, only to discover that their cutie marks have been switched and that they all struggle with their new situation.
40	"I've Got to Find a Way"	"Magical Mystery Cure"	Daniel Ingram	Daniel Ingram	Shoichet (Twilight Sparkle)	-	Twilight blames herself for the cutie mark-switching spell that made her friends miserable. (first song entirely written and composed by Daniel Ingram)
41	"A True, True Friend"	"Magical Mystery Cure"	Daniel Ingram	Daniel Ingram	Shoichet (Twilight Sparkle), Libman (Fluttershy), Ball (Rainbow Dash, Applejack), Evans (Rarity)	Chan-Kent (Pinkie Pie)^{2}, Weseluck (Spike), UBC Singers (Ponyville)	After Twilight finds a solution to the spell, each member of the Mane Six is given her real cutie mark and helps another member get her own mark back as well.
42	"Celestia's Ballad"	"Magical Mystery Cure"	Daniel Ingram	Daniel Ingram	Nicole Oliver (Princess Celestia)	-	Celestia expresses pride over Twilight's many accomplishments, and tells her that the time has come for her to fulfill her destiny.
43	"Behold, Princess Twilight Sparkle"	"Magical Mystery Cure"	Daniel Ingram	Daniel Ingram	University of British Columbia Choir (Canterlot ponies)		Having been granted wings by Celestia, Twilight is crowned a princess.
44	"Life in Equestria"	"Magical Mystery Cure"	Daniel Ingram	M.A. Larson	Shoichet (Twilight Sparkle)	Ball (Rainbow Dash, Applejack), Evans (Rarity), Libman (Fluttershy), Chan-Kent (Pinkie Pie), Weseluck (Spike), UBC Singers (Canterlot ponies)	A reprise of "Morning in Ponyville", in which Twilight and her friends rejoice that things are and will be fine not only in Ponyville, but in Equestria altogether.

^{1}In case of several characters providing lead vocals, the performers are listed in the order in which their characters (of the first of their characters in case they voice several) start singing.
^{2}Pinkie Pie just shouts before singing.

=== Season 4 (2013–14) ===
#	Title	Episode	Music	Lyrics	Performer (character)^{1}	Backing vocals	Context
45	"Hearts Strong as Horses"	"Flight to the Finish"	Daniel Ingram	Ed Valentine, Daniel Ingram	Creber (Apple Bloom), Claire Corlett (Sweetie Belle), Peters (Scootaloo)	-	The Cutie Mark Crusaders sing about how they will never give up and keep trying to get their cutie marks. (This is the first song with Claire Corlett voicing her character; Sweetie Belle's singing parts were previously performed by Creber. She performs all of her character's songs from this episode onward.)
46	"Bats"	"Bats!"	Daniel Ingram	Merriwether Williams, Daniel Ingram	Ball (Applejack, Rainbow Dash), Libman (Fluttershy), Evans (Rarity)	-	Applejack curses the vampire fruit bats that have infested her orchard and wants to get rid of them, while Fluttershy disapproves and wishes to protect them.
47	"Generosity"	"Rarity Takes Manehattan"	Daniel Ingram	Dave Polsky, Daniel Ingram	Evans (Rarity), Ball (Applejack, Rainbow Dash), Libman (Fluttershy, Pinkie Pie^{5})	-	Rarity sings about her love of Manehattan and how she wants to be generous to all. In a reprise later in the episode, she laments on how she has failed her friends.
48	"Apples to the Core"	"Pinkie Apple Pie"	Daniel Ingram	Natasha Levinger, Daniel Ingram	Ball (Applejack), Creber (Apple Bloom), St. Germain (Granny Smith), Chan-Kent (Pinkie Pie)	Peter New (Big McIntosh)	The Apples and Pinkie, who may be a member of their family as well, sing about how happy they are to be a part of the Apple family.
49	"Glass of Water"	"Three's a Crowd"	Daniel Ingram	Ed Valentine	John de Lancie (Discord)	McKillip (Princess Cadance), Strong (Twilight Sparkle)^{2}	While feeling ill and with Twilight and Princess Cadance taking care of him, Discord takes full advantage of their kindness by giving them impossible and nonsensical requests.
50	"Pinkie the Party Planner"	"Pinkie Pride"	Daniel Ingram	Amy Keating Rogers, Daniel Ingram	Chan-Kent (Pinkie Pie), Brian Drummond (Mr. Carrot Cake), St. Germain (Mrs. Cup Cake), Chantal Strand (Diamond Tiara)	Ensemble (Ponyville)	Pinkie sings about her happiness at organizing parties, with all the town agreeing on how much they appreciate her.
51	"The Super Duper Party Pony"	"Pinkie Pride"	Daniel Ingram	Amy Keating Rogers, Daniel Ingram	"Weird Al" Yankovic (Cheese Sandwich), Chan-Kent (Pinkie Pie)	-	Cheese Sandwich sings about his love of parties and how there is no other party pony like him; while Pinkie shares his joy at first, she ultimately feels left out.
52	"Pinkie's Lament"	"Pinkie Pride"	Daniel Ingram	Daniel Ingram	Chan-Kent (Pinkie Pie)	-	Pinkie feels that now that Cheese is in Ponyville, it seems she is not needed anymore. However, while remembering her favorite parties, she gains newborn determination and decides to reclaim her title as premiere party planner.
53	"The Goof Off"	"Pinkie Pride"	Daniel Ingram, "Weird Al" Yankovic, Jaromír Vejvoda, traditional	Daniel Ingram, Amy Keating Rogers	Libman (Pinkie Pie)^{5}, Yankovic (Cheese Sandwich)	-	Pinkie and Cheese face each other in a "goof-off" of which Rainbow Dash is the judge. (only occurrence in the series where a singer was involved in the songwriting process. Pinkie Pie also shortly sings in Spanish, the only time a song is not entirely in English. Small parts are the song are adapted from traditional songs.)
54	"Cheese Confesses"	"Pinkie Pride"	Daniel Ingram	Daniel Ingram, Amy Keating Rogers	Yankovic (Cheese Sandwich), Chan-Kent (Pinkie Pie)	-	Cheese confesses that in truth, he became a party pony thanks to Pinkie, whom he witnessed a party thrown by when he was a young colt. The song then turns into a duet with Pinkie, as they sing about their happiness to both be party ponies.
55	"Make a Wish"	"Pinkie Pride"	Daniel Ingram	Daniel Ingram	Chan-Kent (Pinkie Pie)	-	The characters finally celebrate Rainbow Dash's birthday.
56	"Music in the Treetops"	"Filli Vanilli"	Daniel Ingram	Daniel Ingram	Libman (Fluttershy)	Evans (Rarity), New (Big McIntosh), Jerrica Santos (Torch Song), Danny Balkwill (Toe-Tapper), Crawford Doran^{3}	Fluttershy sings a song while happily taking care of her animals. In a reprise at the end of the episode, she sings with The Pony Tones as a quintet.
57	"Find the Music in You"	"Filli Vanilli"	Daniel Ingram	Daniel Ingram	New (Big McIntosh) (first version) Marcus Mosley (Fluttershy) (later versions)	Evans (Rarity), Jerrica Santos (Torch Song), Danny Balkwill (Toe-Tapper), Crawford Doran^{3}	A song performed by the group The Pony Tones several times in the episode: First as an a capella quartet during a rehearsal with their original lineup: Rarity (soprano), Torch Song (alto), Toe-Tapper (tenor) and Big McIntosh (bass).; Then without Big McIntosh, who is replaced by Fluttershy; like for the season 1 song "Evil Enchantress Song", Fluttershy uses a magical plant to gain a deep and masculine voice and fill in for the ill Big McIntosh, by hiding behind the curtain.; During a montage depicting several performances, still with Fluttershy.; Fluttershy's final performance as Big McIntosh's's replacement; she gets too heated up and reveals herself to the audience by mistake.
58	"Flim Flam Miracle Curative Tonic"	"Leap of Faith"	Daniel Ingram	Josh Haber, Daniel Ingram	Vincent (Flim), McNeil (Flam), Ian James Corlett (Silver Shill)	St. Germain (Granny Smith), crowd	The Flim Flam Brothers present their new invention, the Flim Flam Miracle Curative Tonic, causing radically different reactions from the members of the Apple family.
59	"The Rappin' Hist'ry of the Wonderbolts"	"Testing Testing 1, 2, 3"	William Anderson	Amy Keating Rogers	Libman (Pinkie Pie)^{2}	Jim Miller (Goldengrape), Jayson Thiessen (Dr. Hooves)	The Mane Six all try their own method to teach Rainbow Dash the history of the Wonderbolts; Pinkie's method is a rap song. (Miller and Thiessen, who voice Pinkie's backing vocalists, are two of the directors of the series)
60	"You'll Play Your Part"	"Twilight's Kingdom - Part 1"	Daniel Ingram	Daniel Ingram, Meghan McCarthy	Shoichet (Twilight Sparkle), Oliver (Princess Celestia), Evans (Princess Luna), McKillip (Princess Cadance)	-	Although grateful, Twilight feels she has yet to find her true purpose as a princess of Equestria. The three other princesses reassure her that she will find her role.
61	"Let the Rainbow Remind You"	"Twilight's Kingdom - Part 2"	Daniel Ingram	Daniel Ingram, Meghan McCarthy	Shoichet (Twilight Sparkle), Libman (Fluttershy)	Ball (Rainbow Dash, Applejack), Chan-Kent (Pinkie Pie), Evans (Rarity)	After Twilight has found her role as the Princess of Friendship and is given a new castle, the Mane Six sing about their unity and the magic of friendship.

^{1}In case of several characters providing lead vocals, the performers are listed in the order in which their characters (of the first of their characters in case they voice several) start singing.
^{2}Not the person usually voicing the character in songs; those are spoken vocals.
^{3}The singer is not portraying a character.
^{5}Not the person usually voicing the character in songs.

=== Season 5 (2015) ===
#	Title	Episode	Music	Lyrics	Performer (character)^{1}	Backing vocals	Context
62	"In Our Town"	"The Cutie Map"	Daniel Ingram	Daniel Ingram	Kelly Sheridan (Starlight Glimmer)	Ensemble (Village ponies of Our Town)	Starlight Glimmer and her followers perform a song to convince the Mane Six of how perfect their town is and how everyone there is equal.
63	"Make This Castle a Home"	"Castle Sweet Castle"	Daniel Ingram, David Corman^{6}	Daniel Ingram, Joanna Lewis, Kristine Songco	Ball (Rainbow Dash, Applejack), Evans (Rarity), Libman (Fluttershy), Chan-Kent (Pinkie)	-	The rest of the Mane Six work together to redecorate Twilight's new castle.
64	"I'll Fly"	"Tanks for the Memories"	Daniel Ingram	Daniel Ingram, Cindy Morrow	Ball (Rainbow Dash)	-	Refusing to let her pet tortoise hibernate as winter is coming, Rainbow Dash tries in vain to stop the arrival of winter.
65	"Rules of Rarity"	"Canterlot Boutique"	Daniel Ingram	Amy Keating Rogers, Daniel Ingram	Evans (Rarity)	-	Rarity initially rejoices about her newborn success in fashion. However, she becomes dillusioned when she realizes that her work is now limited to sewing the same one dress over and over; ultimately, she finds her inspiration once again.
66	"Sisterhood"	"Brotherhooves Social"	Daniel Ingram	Daniel Ingram	Creber (Apple Bloom), New (Big McIntosh)	-	Apple Bloom and Big McIntosh sing together as a part of the Sisterhooves Social competition; Big McIntosh, who is pretending to be Apple Bloom's fake female cousin in order to participate, sings in falsetto.
67	"We'll Make Our Mark (Prelude)"	"Crusaders of the Lost Mark"	Daniel Ingram	Daniel Ingram, Amy Keating Rogers	Creber (Apple Bloom), Corlett (Sweetie Belle), Peters (Scootaloo)	-	The Cutie Mark Crusaders re-affirm once again their strong will, and that they will never give up on searching for their cutie marks.
68	"The Vote"	"Crusaders of the Lost Mark"	Daniel Ingram	Daniel Ingram, Amy Keating Rogers	Creber (Apple Bloom), Corlett (Sweetie Belle), Peters (Scootaloo), Strand (Diamond Tiara), Chan-Kent (Silver Spoon)	Ensemble (School ponies)	As the school ponies must elect their new president, the Crusaders try to convince the school to vote for their classmate Pipsqueak while Diamond Tiara tries to convince them to reelect herself.
69	"The Pony I Want to Be"	"Crusaders of the Lost Mark"	Daniel Ingram	Daniel Ingram, Amy Keating Rogers	Strand (Diamond Tiara)	-	Heartbroken by her loss in the election, her best friend Silver Spoon turning on her and the anger of her mother regarding her defeat, Diamond Tiara reveals that she secretly wishes to be a better pony.
70	"Light of Your Cutie Mark"	"Crusaders of the Lost Mark"	Daniel Ingram	Daniel Ingram	Strand (Diamond Tiara), Creber (Apple Bloom), Corlett (Sweetie Belle), Peters (Scootaloo)	-	As Diamond Tiara is on her way to seize the opportunity to replace Pipsqueak as president, the Crusaders try to dissuade her.
71	"The Pony I Want to Be (Reprise)"	"Crusaders of the Lost Mark"	Daniel Ingram	Daniel Ingram	Strand (Diamond Tiara)	-	The now reformed Diamond Tiara gets her fellow students to help repair the damaged playground.
72	"We'll Make Our Mark"	"Crusaders of the Lost Mark"	Daniel Ingram	Daniel Ingram, Amy Keating Rogers	Creber (Apple Bloom), Corlett (Sweetie Belle), Peters (Scootaloo), Ball (Rainbow Dash), Evans (Rarity), Strand (Diamond Tiara)^{7}	Ball (Applejack)	Having finally obtained their long-awaited cutie marks, the Crusaders are congratulated by their loved ones and look towards the future and the adventures awaiting them.
73	"Equestria, the Land I Love"	"The Mane Attraction"	Daniel Ingram	Amy Keating Rogers	Lena Hall (Coloratura)	-	A young Coloratura sings her love of Equestria, with Applejack playing the guitar.
74	"The Spectacle"	"The Mane Attraction"	Daniel Ingram	Amy Keating Rogers, Daniel Ingram	Lena Hall (Coloratura)	-	A now famous and barely recognizable Coloratura performs a pop song; her former friend, Applejack, has trouble believing it.
75	"The Magic Inside"	"The Mane Attraction"	Daniel Ingram	Amy Keating Rogers, Daniel Ingram	Lena Hall (Coloratura)	-	Having realized that she can be her true self both on stage and in her life, Coloratura opens herself to her fans for the first time.
76	"Equestria, the Land I Love (Reprise)"	"The Mane Attraction"	Daniel Ingram	Amy Keating Rogers	Hall (Coloratura), Creber (Apple Bloom), Corlett (Sweetie Belle), Peters (Scootaloo)	-	Coloratura lets the Crusaders join her on stage and performs with them.
77	"Friends Are Always There for You"	"The Cutie Re-Mark"	Daniel Ingram	Josh Haber, Daniel Ingram	Sheridan (Starlight Glimmer), Shoichet (Twilight Sparkle)	Ball (Rainbow Dash, Applejack), Chan-Kent (Pinkie Pie), Evans (Rarity), Libman (Fluttershy)	The now reformed Starlight Glimmer realizes that even after all her mistakes, she can still find true friendship; the Mane Six happily accept her as their new friend.

^{1}In case of several characters providing lead vocals, the performers are listed in the order in which their characters (of the first of their characters in case they voice several) start singing.
^{6}Corman is credited for the guitar and mandolin parts only. ^{7}Diamond Tiara's part in this song is for a deleted verse only.

=== Season 6 (2016) ===
#	Title	Episode	Music	Lyrics	Performer (character)^{1}	Backing vocals	Context
78	"Out on My Own"	"On Your Marks"	Daniel Ingram	Daniel Ingram, Josh Haber, Dave Polsky	Creber (Apple Bloom)	-	As the Crusaders decide to do things apart from each other from the first time, Apple Bloom has trouble dealing with her loneliness.
79	"Hearth's Warming Eve Is Here Once Again"	"A Hearth's Warming Tail"	Daniel Ingram	Michael Vogel	Libman (Fluttershy), Ball (Rainbow Dash, Applejack), Chan-Kent (Pinkie Pie), Evans (Rarity)	Ensemble (Ponyville citizens)	Ponyville rejoices as they prepare to celebrate Hearth's Warming Eve.
80	"Say Goodbye to the Holiday"	"A Hearth's Warming Tail"	Daniel Ingram	Michael Vogel	Sheridan (Starlight Glimmer / Snowfall Frost)	-	In a story within a story, Snowfall Frost (represented by Starlight Glimmer) schemes to make Hearth's Warming Eve disappear forever.
81	"The Seeds of the Past"	"A Hearth's Warming Tail"	Daniel Ingram	Michael Vogel	Ball (Applejack / Spirit of Hearth's Warming Past) (part 1); Ball and Sheridan (Starlight Glimmer / Snowfall Frost) (part 2)	-	The Spirit of Hearth's Warming Past (represented by Applejack) visits Frost and travels with her to the past to find out how she came to hate the holiday.
82	"Pinkie's Present"	"A Hearth's Warming Tail"	Daniel Ingram	Michael Vogel	Chan-Kent (Pinkie Pie /Spirit of Hearth's Warming Present)	-	The Spirit of Hearth's Warming Presents (represented by Pinkie) teaches Frost the joy of giving and receiving presents during Hearth's Warming Eve. The song also features a tap dance section.
83	"Luna's Future"	"A Hearth's Warming Tail"	Daniel Ingram	Daniel Ingram, Michael Vogel	Aloma Steele (Princess Luna / Spirit of Hearth's Warming Yet to Come)	-	The Spirit of Hearth's Warming Yet to Come (represented by Luna) warns Frost that should her plan to make Hearth's Warming Eve disappear work, there would be no love and joy left and the world would be at the mercy of windigos.
84	"Hearth's Warming Eve Is Here Once Again (Reprise)"	"A Hearth's Warming Tail"	Daniel Ingram	Daniel Ingram, Michael Vogel	Sheridan (Starlight Glimmer)	Shoichet (Twilight Sparkle), Ball (Rainbow Dash, Applejack), Chan-Kent (Pinkie Pie), Evans (Rarity), Libman (Fluttershy), Weseluck (Spike), Creber (Apple Bloom), Corlett (Sweetie Belle), Peters (Scootaloo), New (Big McIntosh), Ensemble (Ponyville citizens)	Finally convinced of the importance of Hearth's Warming Eve, Starlight celebrates the holiday with the rest of Ponyville.
85	"I Can Do It on My Own" (Note: Erroneously credited in the episode as "Can I Do It On My Own".)	"Flutter Brutter"	Daniel Ingram	Daniel Ingram, Dave Rapp	Libman (Fluttershy), Ryan Beil (Zephyr Breeze), Ball (Rainbow Dash)	-	Fluttershy and Rainbow Dash encourage Zephyr Breeze to gain confidence in himself and live a fulfilling life.
86	"It's Gonna Work"	"Spice Up Your Life"	Daniel Ingram	Michael Vogel	Evans (Rarity), Chan-Kent (Pinkie Pie)	-	While Rarity tries to help the Tasty Treat owner Coriander Cumin to improve his restaurant, Pinkie does the same with his daughter and co-worker Saffron Masala; unfortunately, neither realizes that they have contradicting visions on how to improve it.
87	"Derby Racers"	"The Cart Before the Ponies"	Daniel Ingram	Ed Valentine, Daniel Ingram	Ball (Rainbow Dash, Applejack), Evans (Rarity), Creber (Apple Bloom), Corlett (Sweetie Belle), Peters (Scootaloo)	Nicole Oliver (Cheerliee), Ensemble (Derby spectators)	During the annual Applewood Derby, the Cutie Mark Crusaders regret having asked Rainbow Dash, Rarity and Applejack for their help as they do not race the way each intended to; oblivious of the younger one's feelings, the trio enjoys the race.
88	"A Changeling Can Change"	"The Times They Are a Changeling"	Daniel Ingram	Kevin Burke, Chris Wyatt	Weseluck (Spike)	-	Spike sings to convince the ponies at the Crystal Empire that Thorax, a member of the usually evil changelings, is reformed.
89	"Find the Purpose in Your Life"	"The Fault in Our Cutie Marks"	Daniel Ingram	Ed Valentine, Daniel Ingram	Corlett (Sweetie Belle), Peters (Scootaloo), Creber (Apple Bloom), Erin Mathews (Gabby)	-	The Cutie Mark Crusaders decide to help Gabby the griffon find her cutie mark and the purpose in her life.

^{1}In case of several characters providing lead vocals, the performers are listed in the order in which their characters (of the first of their characters in case they voice several) start singing.

=== Season 7 (2017) ===
#	Title	Episode	Music	Lyrics	Performer (character)	Backing vocals	Context
90	"Best Friends Until the End of Time"	"All Bottled Up"	Daniel Ingram	Joanna Lewis, Kristine Songco	Shoichet (Twilight Sparkle), Ball (Applejack, Rainbow Dash), Libman (Fluttershy), Chan-Kent (Pinkie Pie), and Evans (Rarity)	-	The Mane Six celebrate their friendships with one another while on a retreat. The song happens to occur in real time, causing them to miss their chance at breaking the escape room record.
91	"Battle for Sugar Belle"	"Hard to Say Anything"	Daniel Ingram		New (Big McIntosh) and Vincent Tong (Feather Bangs)	-	Big McIntosh and Feather Bangs compete into wooing Sugar Belle with a musical battle.
92	"You're in My Head Like a Catchy Song"	"The Perfect Pear"	Daniel Ingram	Joanna Lewis, Kristine Songco	Felicia Day (Pear Butter)	-	Pear Butter sings to Bright Mac how much she loves him.
93	"Flawless"	"Fame and Misfortune"	Daniel Ingram	Daniel Ingram, M.A. Larson	Shoichet (Twilight Sparkle), Ball (Applejack, Rainbow Dash), Libman (Fluttershy), Evans (Rarity), Chan-Kent (Pinkie Pie)	-	After a gathered crowd outside Twilight's castle is upset with the friendship lessons in their journal, Twilight and her friends sing about how they remain friends despite and because of their problems.
94	"Blank Flanks Forever"	"Marks and Recreation"	Daniel Ingram	May Chan, Daniel Ingram	Tong (Rumble)	Chorus (other foals)	Rumble sings about how he hates cutie marks because he thinks that they limit ponies in what they can do after getting one.

=== Season 8 (2018) ===
For the final two seasons of the show, Daniel Ingram was able to use the Nashville Scoring Orchestra to perform all of the songs.

#	Title	Episode	Music	Lyrics	Performer (character)	Backing vocals	Context
95	"School of Friendship"	"School Daze - Part 1"	Daniel Ingram	Michael Vogel	Shoichet (Twilight Sparkle), Ball (Applejack, Rainbow Dash), Libman (Fluttershy), Chan-Kent (Pinkie Pie), Evans (Rarity) and ensemble	-	The Mane Six open a school to teach other ponies and creatures about friendship. However, Twilight's friends lose confidence as teachers as she forces them to teach "by the book", which loses their students' interest.
96	"Friendship Always Wins"	"School Daze - Part 2"	Daniel Ingram	Daniel Ingram, Nicole Dubuc	Shoichet (Twilight Sparkle), Devyn Dalton (Ocellus), Gavin Langelo (Gallus), Evans (Rarity), Ball (Applejack, Rainbow Dash), Libman (Fluttershy), Chan-Kent (Pinkie Pie), Weseluck (Spike), Sheridan (Starlight Glimmer)	-	The School of Friendship is reopened and run the way the Mane Six truly envision it, bringing the other species together in harmony.
97	"Your Heart is in Two Places"	"Surf and/or Turf"	Daniel Ingram	Brian Hohlfeld	Creber (Apple Bloom), Corlett (Sweetie Belle), and Arielle Tuliao (Scootaloo)	-	Scootaloo and Sweetie Belle have differing opinions on where Terramar should live.
98	"Friendship U"	"Friendship University"	Daniel Ingram	Kevin Burke, Chris Wyatt	Vincent (Flim), McNeil (Flam), and Strong (Twilight Sparkle)	Choir (Friendship University students)	Flim and Flam tout the virtues of their university.
99	"We're Friendship Bound"	"Road to Friendship"	Daniel Ingram	Josh Haber	Sheridan (Starlight Glimmer) and Barr (Trixie)	-	Starlight Glimmer and Trixie embark on a road trip to Saddle Arabia.
100	"A Kirin Tale"	"Sounds of Silence"	Daniel Ingram	Jim Miller, Nicole Dubuc	Rachel Bloom (Autumn Blaze)	-	Autumn Blaze sings about the Kirin lifestyle, why her kind went silent and what led her to live on her own.
101	"Just Can't Be a Dragon Here"	"Father Knows Beast"	Daniel Ingram	Daniel Ingram, Josh Haber	Dave Pettitt (Sludge)	-	Sludge teaches Spike how to live like a dragon raised in the Dragon Lands.

=== Season 9 (2019) ===
#	Title	Episode	Music	Lyrics	Performer (character)	Backing vocals	Context
102	"The Place Where We Belong"	"Uprooted"	Daniel Ingram	Nicole Dubuc	Lauren Jackson (Silverstream), Chan-Kent (Ocellus, Smolder), Tong (Sandbar), Langelo (Gallus), and Katrina Salisbury (Yona)	-	The Young Six work together to build a treehouse in honor of the Tree of Harmony.
103	"Fit Right In"	"She's All Yak"	Daniel Ingram	Brian Hohlfeld, Daniel Ingram	Evans (Rarity) and Salisbury (Yona) (part 1); Evans (Rarity), Salisbury (Yona), Libman (Fluttershy, Pinkie Pie), Ball (Applejack, Rainbow Dash) (part 2)	-	Rarity helps Yona prepare for the Amity Ball; seeing her progress, the Mane Six believe she will fit in easily at the event.
104	"Better Way to Be Bad"	"Frenemies"	Daniel Ingram	Michael Vogel	Sunni Westbrook (Cozy Glow), Mark Acheson (Lord Tirek), and Barr (Queen Chrysalis)	-	Cozy Glow convinces Lord Tirek and Queen Chrysalis through song to join forces so they can avenge themselves against the Mane Six.
105	"Lotta Little Things"	"Between Dark and Dawn"	Daniel Ingram	Gail Simone, Nicole Dubuc	Oliver (Princess Celestia) and Steele (Princess Luna)	-	Celestia and Luna set out to enjoy a vacation together, but start to get on one another's nerves due to their differing activity preferences.
106	"The Last Laugh"		Daniel Ingram	Michael P. Fox and Wil Fox	Yankovic (Cheese Sandwich), Libman (Pinkie Pie), and choir (factory workers)	-	Cheese Sandwich rediscovers his love of making ponies laugh with his jokes and novelties in person, rather than making and selling them.
107	"Being Big is All It Takes"	"Growing Up is Hard to Do"	Daniel Ingram	Ed Valentine	Creber (Apple Bloom), Tuliao (Scootaloo), and Corlett (Sweetie Belle)	-	The Cutie Mark Crusaders sing about all the things they can or could do as grown-ups.
108	"The Magic of Friendship Grows"	"The Last Problem"	Daniel Ingram	Daniel Ingram, Josh Haber	Shoichet (Twilight Sparkle), Chan-Kent (Pinkie Pie), Libman (Fluttershy), Ball (Rainbow Dash, Applejack), and Evans (Rarity)	Ensemble	The Mane Six sing to Luster Dawn of the ways in which their friendships have improved their lives over the years.

== Films ==
=== My Little Pony: The Movie (2017) ===
The six songs that Daniel Ingram wrote made use of the Nashville Scoring Orchestra for their performance.

#	Title	Music	Lyrics	Performer (character)^{1}	Backing vocals	Context
109	"We Got the Beat"	Charlotte Caffey		Rachel Platten^{3}	-	Opening sequence. (based on the song of the same name by The Go-Go's)
110	"We Got This Together"	Daniel Ingram	Michael Vogel, Daniel Ingram	Ball (Applejack, Rainbow Dash), Evans (Rarity), Libman (Fluttershy), Chan-Kent (Pinkie Pie), Shoichet (Twilight Sparkle)	St. Germain (Granny Smith), Creber (Apple Bloom), New (Big McIntosh), Weseluck (Spike), Choir (Canterlot ponies)	Twilight Sparkle is anxious about making Equestria's first Friendship Festival perfect for everyone, so her friends assure her that they have what it takes to get the job done.
111	"I'm the Friend You Need"	Daniel Ingram	Michael Vogel, Daniel Ingram	Taye Diggs (Capper)	Vincent (Klugetown citizen), Tong (Klugetown citizen), Ball (Rainbow Dash, Applejack), Chan-Kent (Pinkie Pie), Libman (Fluttershy), Evans (Rarity), St. Germain (Rarity)^{2}	Con artist Capper presents himself to the Mane Six as a trustworthy friend as he guides them through Klugetown, all while secretly plotting to sell them off to settle a debt.
112	"Time to Be Awesome"	Daniel Ingram	Michael Vogel, Daniel Ingram	Ball (Rainbow Dash), Zoe Saldaña (Captain Celaeno)	Ball (Applejack), Chan-Kent (Pinkie Pie), Libman (Fluttershy), Weseluck (Spike), Mark Oliver (First Mate Mullet), Nicole Oliver (Lix Spittle), Max Martini (Boyle)	Discovering that Captain Celaeno and her delivery crew were once proud pirates, Rainbow Dash and company convince the jaded sailors to renounce their servitude to the Storm King and resume an exciting life of adventure; at the crescendo, Rainbow Dash performs a Sonic Rainboom in the heat of the moment, which allows a pursuing Tempest Shadow to track them.
113	"One Small Thing"	Daniel Ingram	Michael Vogel, Daniel Ingram	Chan-Kent (Pinkie Pie), Kristin Chenoweth (Princess Skystar)	Libman (Fluttershy), Evans (Rarity), Ball (Applejack, Rainbow Dash), Ensemble (Seaponies)	Pinkie Pie and company play with a downtrodden Princess Skystar to cheer her up, eventually inspiring the seaponies to offer the Mane Six their prized magic pearl to defeat the Storm King; Twilight, driven to her wit's end and acting separately from her friends, tries using the party as a distraction to take the pearl herself.
114	"Open Up Your Eyes"	Daniel Ingram	Michael Vogel, Meghan McCarthy, Daniel Ingram	Emily Blunt (Tempest Shadow)	-	After finally capturing a forlorn Twilight, Tempest divulges how she became disenchanted with the ideals of friendship the day she lost her horn and friends as a filly, which has convinced her that she is better off alone, and chiding friendship as a dream Twilight has to wake up from.
115	"Rainbow"	Sia Furler, Jesse Shatkin, James Vincent Notorleva		Sia (Songbird Serenade)	-	Songbird Serenade sings a portion of the song while imprisoned by the Storm King's guards. She performs more of it at the Friendship Festival in honor of the Mane Six for saving Equestria; the remainder is played over the ending credits.
116	"Off to See the World"	Lukas Forchhammer, Christopher Brown, Morten Jensen, Stefan Forrest, Morten Pilegaard, David Labrel		Lukas Graham^{3}	-	Ending credits.

^{1}In case of several characters providing lead vocals, the performers are listed in the order in which their characters (of the first of their characters in case they voice several) start singing.
^{2}Not the person usually voicing the character in songs; those are spoken vocals.
^{3}The singer is not portraying a character.

== Specials ==
=== My Little Pony: Best Gift Ever (2018) ===
#	Title	Music	Lyrics	Performer (character)	Backing vocals	Context
117	"One More Day"	Daniel Ingram	Michael Vogel, Daniel Ingram	Shoichet (Twilight Sparkle), Libman (Fluttershy), Ball (Applejack, Rainbow Dash), Evans (Rarity), Chan-Kent (Pinkie Pie), Weseluck (Spike), and choir	-	The residents of Ponyville are getting ready for Hearth's Warming Eve.
118	"The True Gift of Gifting"	Daniel Ingram	Michael Vogel, Daniel Ingram	Weseluck (Spike) and Shoichet (Twilight Sparkle)	Libman (Fluttershy), Ball (Applejack, Rainbow Dash), Evans (Rarity), Chan-Kent (Pinkie Pie), and choir	First part sung by Spike when he confesses to Rarity that the gift he gave her was the only one he could give. Second part sung by Twilight Sparkle and her friends when they realize friendship's the best gift of all.

=== My Little Pony: Rainbow Roadtrip (2019) ===
#	Title	Music	Lyrics	Performer (character)	Backing vocals	Context
119	"Rainbow Roadtrip"	Daniel Ingram	Daniel Ingram	Shylo Sharity^{3}	-	Opening sequence and end credits.
120	"The End of the Rainbow"	Daniel Ingram	Nicole Dubuc, Daniel Ingram	Ian Hanlin (Sunny Skies)	-	Mayor Sunny Skies sings about the town of Hope Hollow during its heyday, its former Rainbow Festival, and subsequent decline.
121	"Living in Color"	Daniel Ingram	Nicole Dubuc, Daniel Ingram	Shoichet (Twilight Sparkle), Ball (Applejack, Rainbow Dash), Evans (Rarity), Libman (Fluttershy), Chan-Kent (Pinkie Pie), Racquel Belmonte (Kerfluffle), Terry Klassen (Moody Root), and Veena Sood (Mrs. Hoofington)	Choir (ponies of Hope Hollow)	Alongside the Mane Six, the ponies of Hope Hollow celebrate the Rainbow Festival again and the colors returning to the town.

^{3}The singer is not portraying a character.

== Other ==
#	Title	Music	Lyrics	Performer (character)	Backing vocals	Context
122	"Friendship Is Magic"	Daniel Ingram; Anne Bryant and Clifford "Ford" Klinder (original theme)	Lauren Faust	Ball (Rainbow Dash, Applejack), Libman (Pinkie Pie, Fluttershy), Evans (Rarity)	-	Opening theme played at the beginning of every episode and end credits (instrumental) of most episodes.
123	"Equestria"	Daniel Ingram	Daniel Ingram, Michael Vogel	Choir	-	Original opening song for My Little Pony: The Movie; it was replaced by Rachel Platten's cover of "We Got the Beat" by The Go-Go's.

== Discography ==
=== Soundtrack albums ===
Title	Details	Peak chart positions	
Title	Details	US Soundtracks	US Kids
My Little Pony - Songs of Friendship and Magic (Music from the Original TV Series)	Released: December 2, 2013; Label: Hasbro Studios; Formats: digital download, streaming	—	—
My Little Pony - Songs of Ponyville (Music from the Original TV Series)	Released: April 21, 2014; Label: Hasbro Studios; Formats: digital download, streaming	20	9
My Little Pony - Songs of Harmony (Music from the Original TV Series)	Released: April 13, 2015; Label: Hasbro Studios, Pony Records; Formats: digital download	22	—
Friendship is Magic: Pinkie Pie's Party Playlist	Released: July 15, 2016; Label: Legacy Recordings; Formats: digital download, streaming	—	21
My Little Pony: The Movie (Original Motion Picture Soundtrack)	Released: September 22, 2017; Label: RCA Records; Formats: CD, digital download, streaming	18	6

=== Compilation albums ===
Title	Details
My Little Pony: Friendship Is Magic - Magical Friendship Tour	Released: September 16, 2014 (Hot Topic); Label: Hasbro Studios, Soundlab9; Formats: Vinyl
DJ PON-3 Presents My Little Pony Friendship is Magic Remixed	Released: June 2, 2015; Label: Hasbro Studios, Lakeshore Records; Formats: CD, digital download, streaming
My Little Pony - Friendship is Magic Collection	Released: April 22, 2016; Label: Hasbro Studios; Formats: digital download
My Little Pony: Friendship is Magic - Explore Equestria: Greatest Hits	Released: November 25, 2016; Label: Hasbro Studios, Sony Music Entertainment; Formats: Vinyl
My Little Pony: Friendship is Magic (Exclusive Pink Vinyl)	Released: November 16, 2018; Label: Hasbro Studios; Formats: Vinyl
