= My Little Pony: Friendship Is Magic theme song =

Theme song from My Little Pony: Friendship Is Magic

Single by Mane Six (Rebecca Shoichet as Twilight Sparkle)
- Released: October 10, 2010
- Genre: Theme song
- Length: 0:45 (opening version); 2:02 (extended version)
- Label: Hasbro Studios
- Songwriter: Daniel Ingram
- Composer: Daniel Ingram
- Lyricist: Lauren Faust

The My Little Pony: Friendship Is Magic theme song was composed by Daniel Ingram with lyrics written by show creator Lauren Faust. It has been featured in the opening credits of every episode from the show's premiere in 2010 through its conclusion in 2019, with minor variations introduced across different seasons.

== Background ==
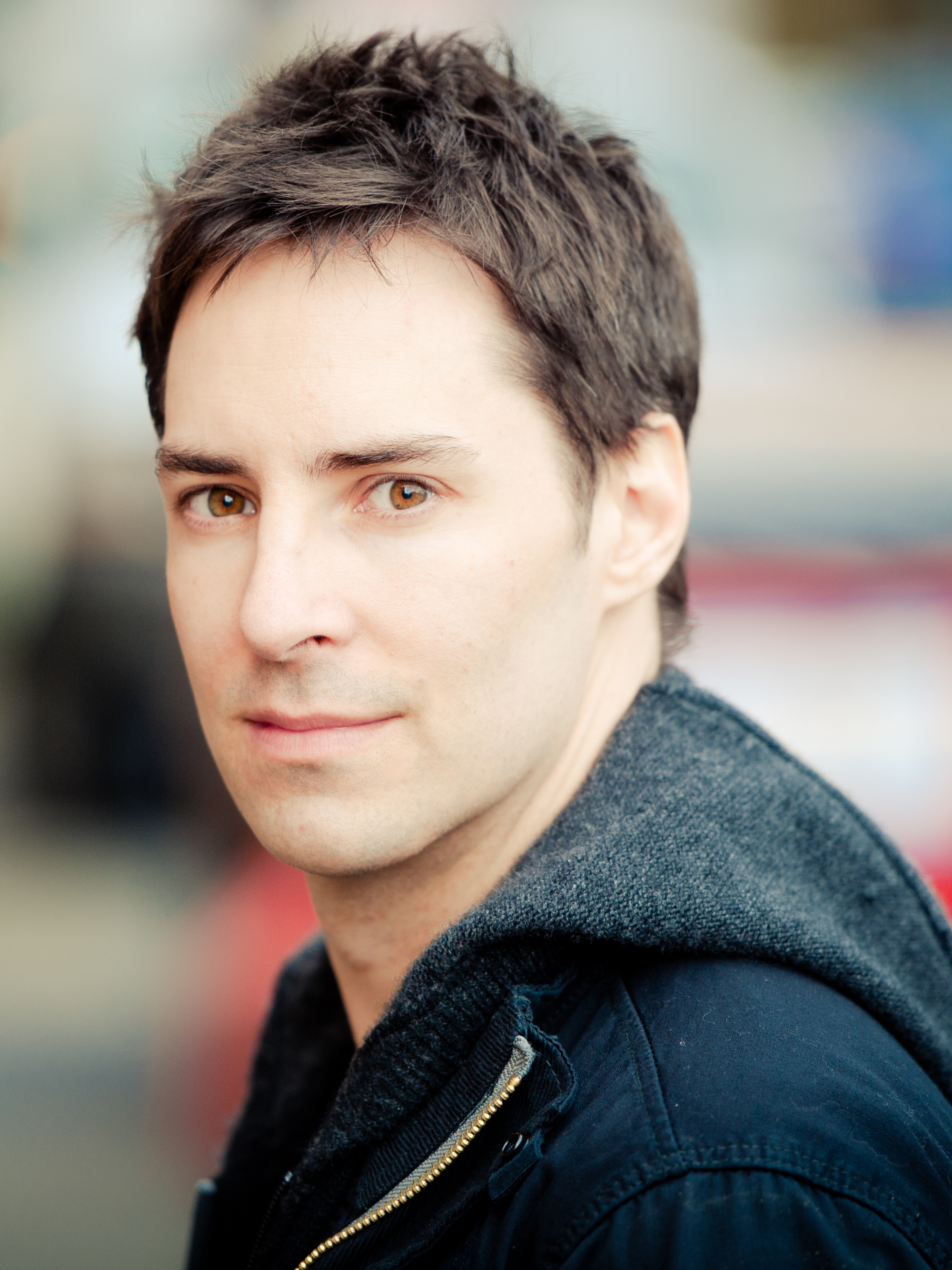
Daniel Ingram composed the theme song.

My Little Pony: Friendship Is Magic is an animated television series based on Hasbro's My Little Pony franchise that debuted on October 10, 2010. The series was developed by Lauren Faust, who sought to create a show that would appeal to both its target demographic of young girls and their parents. Friendship Is Magic became one of the highest-rated productions in The Hub's history. The series features a recurring cast of pony characters in the fictional land of Equestria. The show is known for its musical numbers, with composer Daniel Ingram creating original songs for many episodes. Songs that were composed by Ingram, such as "This Day Aria", have received particular critical acclaim. Despite its target demographic of young girls, the series attracted an unexpectedly large following of older viewers known as bronies.

The theme song uses the melody and motifs from earlier My Little Pony generations' theme songs, particularly from the 1980s animated series.

== Reception ==
Tiarni Abdulovski of Capsule Computers wrote that the Friendship Is Magic theme song "is not an easy tune to forget" and "extremely catchy". Gianna Cabrera of Columbus State University wrote in literary journal Arden that as a child, she would hum the theme song to escape from nightmares and described it as her only means of comfort during frightening dreams. The theme song is often remixed by members of the brony fandom.

In April 2025, the Sacramento Kings used the theme song to introduce the Dallas Mavericks starting lineup during a play-in game; each player's name was punctuated by the sound of a neighing horse.

== Analysis ==
In a study of translations of My Little Pony songs into the Indonesian language, Nunuk Tri Hapsari wrote that some lyrics were condensed, causing them to lose some of their temporal nuances (e.g. "I used to wonder what friendship could be" [meaning "I used to wonder what friendship really was and now it is no longer questioned"] to "Apa makna persahabatan" [transl. "What is the meaning of friendship?"]).

== See also ==
- My Little Pony: Friendship Is Magic discography
- "This Day Aria"
- "Off to See the World"
- "Rainbow"
