= Open Up Your Eyes =

Open Up Your Eyes may refer to:

- "Open Up Your Eyes", a song by Tonic from the 1996 album Lemon Parade
- "Open Up Your Eyes", a song by Daughtry from the 2009 album Leave This Town
- "Open Up Your Eyes", a song by Emily Blunt from the 2017 soundtrack album My Little Pony: The Movie
