= This Day Aria =

Song from My Little Pony

- Queen Chrysalis (left), disguised as Princess Cadance, and the real Cadance (right) perform "This Day Aria" in a split-screen sequence from "A Canterlot Wedding".

Single by Princess Cadance (Britt McKillip) and Queen Chrysalis (Kathleen Barr)
- Released: April 21, 2012
- Genre: Musical theatre
- Length: 2:16
- Label: Hasbro Studios; Legacy Recordings
- Songwriter: Daniel Ingram
- Composers: Daniel Ingram; Steffan Andrews
- Lyricist: Meghan McCarthy

"This Day Aria" is a song from the second season episode "A Canterlot Wedding – Part 2" of the animated television series My Little Pony: Friendship Is Magic. In the episode, the song is performed by the characters Princess Cadance (voiced by Britt McKillip) and Queen Chrysalis (voiced by Kathleen Barr). The song is a duet that alternates between the perspectives of the real Princess Cadance (who is imprisoned) and the villainous Queen Chrysalis (who is disguised as Cadance). It has been described as one of the greatest songs of the series and a fan favorite among the brony fandom.

== Background ==
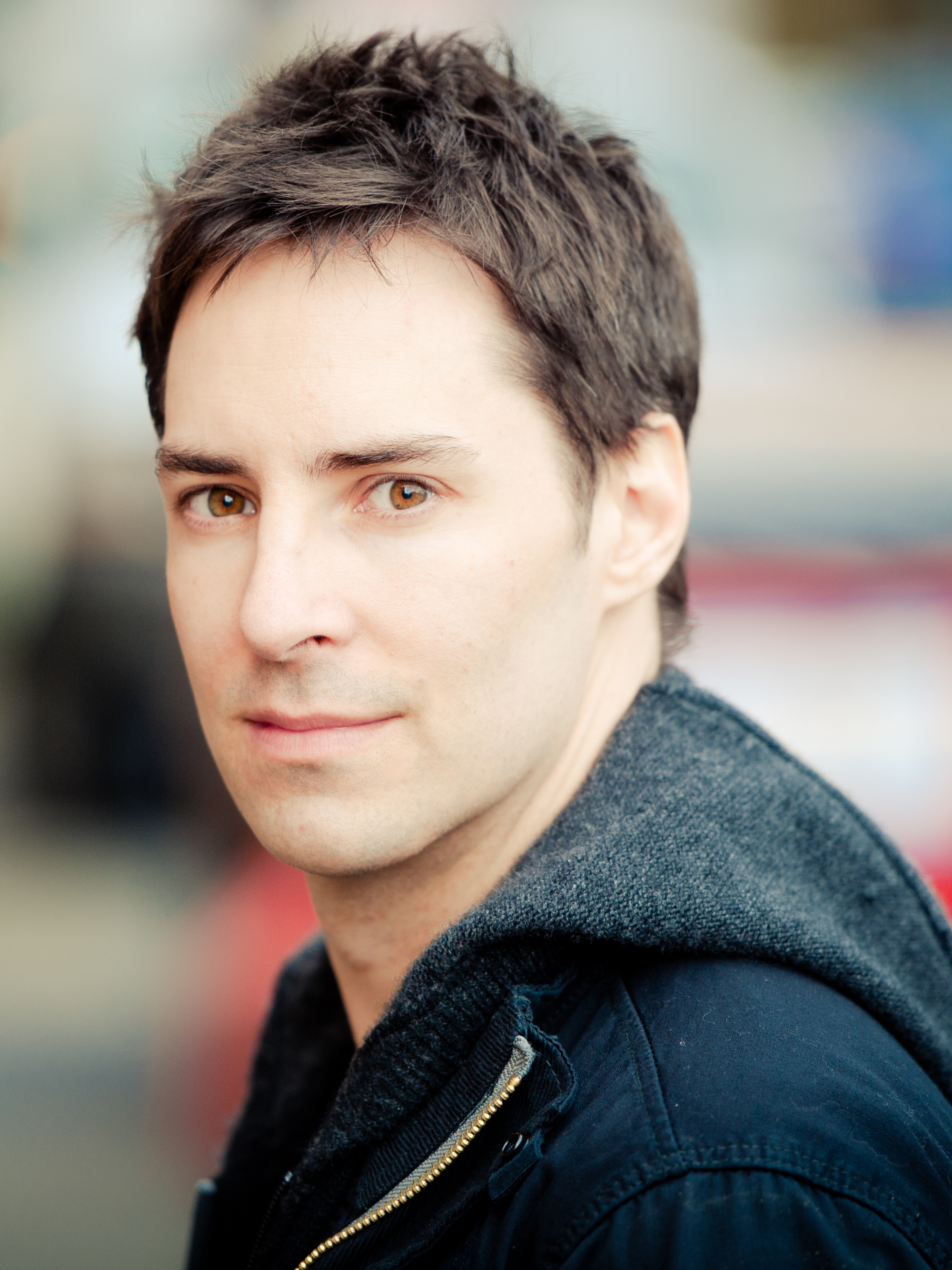
Daniel Ingram wrote and composed "This Day Aria".

My Little Pony: Friendship Is Magic is an animated television series based on Hasbro's My Little Pony franchise that debuted on October 10, 2010. Friendship Is Magic became one of the highest-rated productions in The Hub's history. The series features a recurring cast of pony characters in the fictional land of Equestria. The show is known for its musical numbers, with composer Daniel Ingram and lyricist Meghan McCarthy creating original songs for many episodes. Despite its target demographic of young girls, the series attracted an unexpectedly large following of older viewers known as bronies.

External videos
- Friendship is Magic - 'This Day Aria' Music Video — Official upload of the episode onto YouTube

"This Day Aria" appears in the second part of "A Canterlot Wedding", the season finale of the show's second season, which aired on April 21, 2012. The two-part episode centers on the wedding of Shining Armor and Princess Cadance, which is disrupted when it is revealed that Cadance has been replaced by Queen Chrysalis, the leader of the changelings—a race of insect-like creatures who are able to change their appearance to that of ponies. The song occurs at a pivotal moment in the episode when the narrative intercuts between Queen Chrysalis singing about her villainous plans while the real Cadance, imprisoned in caves beneath Canterlot, sings about her despair.

== Reception ==
"This Day Aria" received widespread critical acclaim and is considered one of the greatest songs of Friendship Is Magic. Emily St. James of The A.V. Club and Sherilyn Connelly of SF Weekly called the music of the episode "one of the best things about this show" and "just breathtaking", respectively; both singled out "This Day Aria" for particular acclaim. Connelly considered it to be showstopping, and approvingly likened it to "La Resistance" from South Park: Bigger, Longer & Uncut and "Walk Through the Fire" from Buffy the Vampire Slayer; St. James favorably compared it to classic Disney villain songs. Rae Grimes of Comic Book Resources ranked "This Day Aria" as the best song from the show; she wrote that it was reminiscent of a Disney musical number and was "on another level compared to the music in the rest of the series." Tyler B. Searle of Collider called the song "fantastic" and wrote that it was "as good as the best Disney villain songs." Author Jen A. Blue described "This Day Aria" as a "virtuoso solo passage" and "easily the best song in the show to that point". Shaun Scotellaro, the founder of fan site Equestria Daily, wrote that the song gave "a full on Disney feel" and said it was the pony song he had listened to the most. Fandom musician Vylet Pony cited "This Day Aria" as the catalyst for her involvement in the brony fandom and her pursuit of music production.

== Analysis ==
In a collection of essays on Friendship Is Magic, author Jen A. Blue wrote that Chrysalis represents pure power without the capacity for love, as she triumphantly declares:

I could care less about the dress
I won't partake of any cake
Vows—well I'll be lying when I say
That through any kind of weather
I'll want us to be together
The truth is I don’t care for him at all
No, I do not love the groom
In my heart there is no room
But I still want him to be all mine!

Blue wrote that despite appearing to be a duet between Chrysalis and Cadance, "This Day Aria" functions as an aria since "Chrysalis isn't just disguised as Cadance; in a sense, she is Cadance, another side of the same coin." According to Blue, both characters represent different aspects of love ("Chrysalis devours while Cadance creates") with their shared power demonstrating that "within a universe where friendship is magic, love is pure power."

In a chapter of Orienting Feminism, Kevin Fletcher wrote that he believed the producers of the song were aware of the post-feminist concept of "having it all"—a rhetoric spawned by post-feminist texts that portray work and social connection as binary options—with the reprise of "This Day Aria" showcasing this awareness. The post-feminist agenda of "having it all", according to Fletcher, is thus deemed harmful since it is linked to an evil queen figure.

== See also ==
- My Little Pony: Friendship Is Magic discography
- My Little Pony: Friendship Is Magic theme song
- "Off to See the World"
- "Rainbow"
