= Princess Cadance =

Fictional character from My Little Pony

- My Little Pony character
- Princess Cadance as she appears in "Three's a Crowd"
- First appearance: "A Canterlot Wedding" (2012)
- Created by: Meghan McCarthy
- Voiced by: Britt McKillip

In-universe information
- Full name: Mi Amore Cadenza
- Species: Alicorn; Pegasus (pre-ascension)
- Titles: Ruler of the Crystal Empire; Princess of Love
- Occupation: Twilight Sparkle's foal-sitter (flashbacks)
- Affiliation: Crystal Empire; Equestrian Royal Family
- Family: Princess Celestia (adoptive aunt); Princess Luna (adoptive aunt)
- Spouse: Shining Armor
- Children: Flurry Heart (daughter)
- Relatives: Twilight Sparkle (sister-in-law); Twilight Velvet (mother-in-law); Night Light (father-in-law); Spike (adoptive brother-in-law)

Princess Mi Amore Cadenza "Cadance" is a fictional character who appears in the fourth incarnation of Hasbro's My Little Pony toyline and media franchise, beginning with My Little Pony: Friendship Is Magic (2010–2019). She first appears in the second season finale as a major character and serves as a recurring character throughout the series. She is voiced by Britt McKillip.

Princess Cadance is depicted as a kind and compassionate anthropomorphic alicorn with a special talent for spreading love and healing broken relationships, and was Twilight Sparkle's foal-sitter. Following her marriage to Twilight’s older brother Shining Armor, Cadence becomes the ruler of the Crystal Empire, and is responsible for protecting its crystal ponies. She is characterized by her multicolored mane and her cutie mark depicting a blue crystal heart.

== Appearances ==
=== Fourth My Little Pony incarnation (2010–2021) ===
==== My Little Pony: Friendship Is Magic ====
Princess Cadance first appears in the second season finale "A Canterlot Wedding" when she is marrying Shining Armor. However, the reunion is complicated when Queen Chrysalis, disguised as Cadance, imprisons her and attempts to drain Shining Armor's love through their wedding ceremony. After being saved by her sister-in-law to be Twilight Sparkle, Cadance manages to reunite with Shining Armor. While too exhausted to use her own magic, the combined magic of Cadance and her fiancé drives the Changelings out of Canterlot.

Cadance takes on a central role in the third season premiere "The Crystal Empire" when she and Shining Armor are tasked with protecting the Crystal Empire from the dark unicorn King Sombra. Throughout the episode, Cadance exhausts herself maintaining a magical barrier around the empire. Ultimately, Cadance uses her love magic alongside the Crystal Heart to "spread love and light" and keep Sombra's corruption at bay. With their hope restored, the Crystal Ponies embrace Cadance as the Crystal Princess.

In "The One Where Pinkie Pie Knows", it is revealed that she and Shining Armor are expecting their first child. In the sixth season premiere "The Crystalling", Cadance gives birth to Flurry Heart, an alicorn foal whose powerful and uncontrollable magic threatens the Crystal Empire.

==== My Little Pony: The Movie ====
Princess Cadance appears in the beginning of the film alongside Celestia and Luna, preparing for the Friendship Festival in Canterlot. When the Storm King's forces, led by Tempest Shadow, attacks Canterlot, Cadance attempts to defend the city, but is turned to stone by Tempest's obsidian orbs. She remains petrified for most of the film until the Storm King’s defeat releases all the captured magic, restoring her and the other princesses to normal.

==== My Little Pony: Pony Life ====
Princess Cadance appears in the spin-off series in the second season episode "What Goes Updo", in which she gives new hairdos to the Twilight and most of her friends at the Crystal Empire Carnaval. Her relations to Twilight and Shining Armor are not specified.

=== Friendship Is Magic comic series ===
In January 2025, IDW released a comic titled "My Little Pony: Rise of Cadance" which tells the story of Princess Cadance's life before the events of the show, from infancy to her ascension as a Princess. In this comic, Cadance reflects that she was found abandoned as a foal and taken in by a village of ponies. When her village is threatened by a sorceress named Prismia, Cadance makes a plea for Princess Celestia to take mercy on the villain, and this show of compassion is what earns young Cadance her cutie mark. Seeing potential in this filly, Celestia takes her to Canterlot where she spends the next several years of her life. When a horde of dragons attacks Canterlot, Cadance is able to convince their leader to surrender through an empathetic speech. Finally, this act of kindness serves as Cadance's final trial as she earns her status as an alicorn and a Princess. Celestia reveals at last that Cadance is a descendant of the Crystal Princess Amore and that her destiny is to one day rule a liberated Crystal Empire.

== Equestria Girls alternate version ==
Cadance's human world counterpart, Dean Cadance appears in the film My Little Pony: Equestria Girls – Friendship Games as the friendly dean of Crystal Prep Academy. She is portrayed as being on good terms with Vice Principal Luna, despite her working at a rival school. She also appears as one of the judges during the titular competition and often offers advice to Twilight Sparkle's human world counterpart at different points of the film. In the special Dance Magic, it is mentioned that she is now the principal of Crystal Prep, now known as Principal Cadance.

== Reception and analysis ==
Media scholar Kevin Fletcher wrote that Princess Cadance represents part of Equestria's "upper-class elite" as one of the four alicorn princesses. Fletcher observed that three of the alicorns are linked to traditional images of planetary deities, suggesting that "Cadance could correspond to Venus" alongside Luna as the moon and Celestia as the sun. He noted that there are different types of alicorns within the show's mythology; he distinguished between those who earn their alicornhood through transformation, like Twilight Sparkle, and those born as alicorns, like Cadance's daughter Flurry Heart. Fletcher also contextualized Cadance's character design within the industry's marketing considerations, and commented on how Hasbro executives' belief that "princess pony toys would be more marketable" than queen toys influenced the franchise's approach to royal character development.

Author Jen A. Blue wrote that Princess Cadance possesses one of the series' most "oversignified" names, with her formal title "Princess Mi Amore Cadenza" carrying dual symbolic meaning: mi amore establishes her as "the Princess of Love" and cadenza is a musical term for an ornamental solo passage. Blue interpreted Cadance's performance in "This Day Aria" as a "virtuoso solo passage," and wrote that despite appearing to be a duet with Queen Chrysalis, it functions as an aria since "Chrysalis isn't just disguised as Cadance; in a sense, she is Cadance, another side of the same coin." According to Blue, both characters represent different aspects of love ("Chrysalis devours while Cadance creates") with their shared power demonstrating that "within a universe where friendship is magic, love is pure power."

Blue also noted how the deceptive cadence (also known as false cadence) that ends "B.B.B.F.F. (Reprise)" creates a musical fake resolution that parallels Chrysalis' impersonation of Cadance. This easter egg was later confirmed to be intentional by song composer Daniel Ingram. Fan news site Equestria Daily quoted a Reddit user, who wrote:

"There was actually a double meaning in the song. The song is in the key of Db Major (just like winter wrap up!) . That means that the root chord is a Db major chord. Usually, a Ab major chord will lead into a Db major. This is the V-I chord progression and it is also known as the Authentic Cadence [...] Now, it seems to resolve to a sadder chord at the end of the phrase. Instead of ending on Db major around 1:16, it lands on Bb minor: the relative minor of Db major. Now, when a chord progression seems to be heading to the root chord but lands on the relative minor instead, that is called a... deceptive cadence.

A study by Christian Valiente and Xeno Rasmusson examining gender roles in Friendship Is Magic identified Princess Cadance as an example of the show's subversion of traditional gender stereotypes: while her wedding episodes ostensibly center on both her and Shining Armor, "the main dialogue and action belong to the females" and the male groom is "relegated to a supporting role." The researchers wrote that Cadance is consistent with the show's pattern of placing female characters "in positions of leadership" and as active decision-makers, particularly when she joins the other princesses in deciding "to give their magic to Twilight".

Carly Olsen, writing in Screen Rant, ranked Cadance as the fifth most powerful magic user in Friendship Is Magic.

== See also ==
- Princess Celestia
- Princess Luna
- Twilight Sparkle
- List of My Little Pony: Friendship Is Magic characters
