= My Little Pony: The Movie (soundtrack) =

2017 My Little Pony soundtrack

My Little Pony: The Movie (Original Motion Picture Soundtrack)

Soundtrack album by Various Artists
- Released: September 22, 2017
- Recorded: 2016–2017
- Studios: Ocean Way, Nashville
- Genre: Pop
- Length: 40:14
- Labels: RCA; Hasbro
- Producers: Daniel Ingram; Paul "DJ White Shadow" Blair

My Little Pony chronology
Explore Equestria: Greatest Hits (2016)	My Little Pony: The Movie (Original Motion Picture Soundtrack) (2017)

Singles from My Little Pony: The Movie (Original Motion Picture Soundtrack)
- 1. "Rainbow" Released: September 15, 2017; 2. "Off to See the World" Released: October 5, 2017

My Little Pony: The Movie (Original Motion Picture Soundtrack) is the soundtrack album to the 2017 film My Little Pony: The Movie. The soundtrack album was released on September 22, 2017 by RCA Records.

== Composition ==
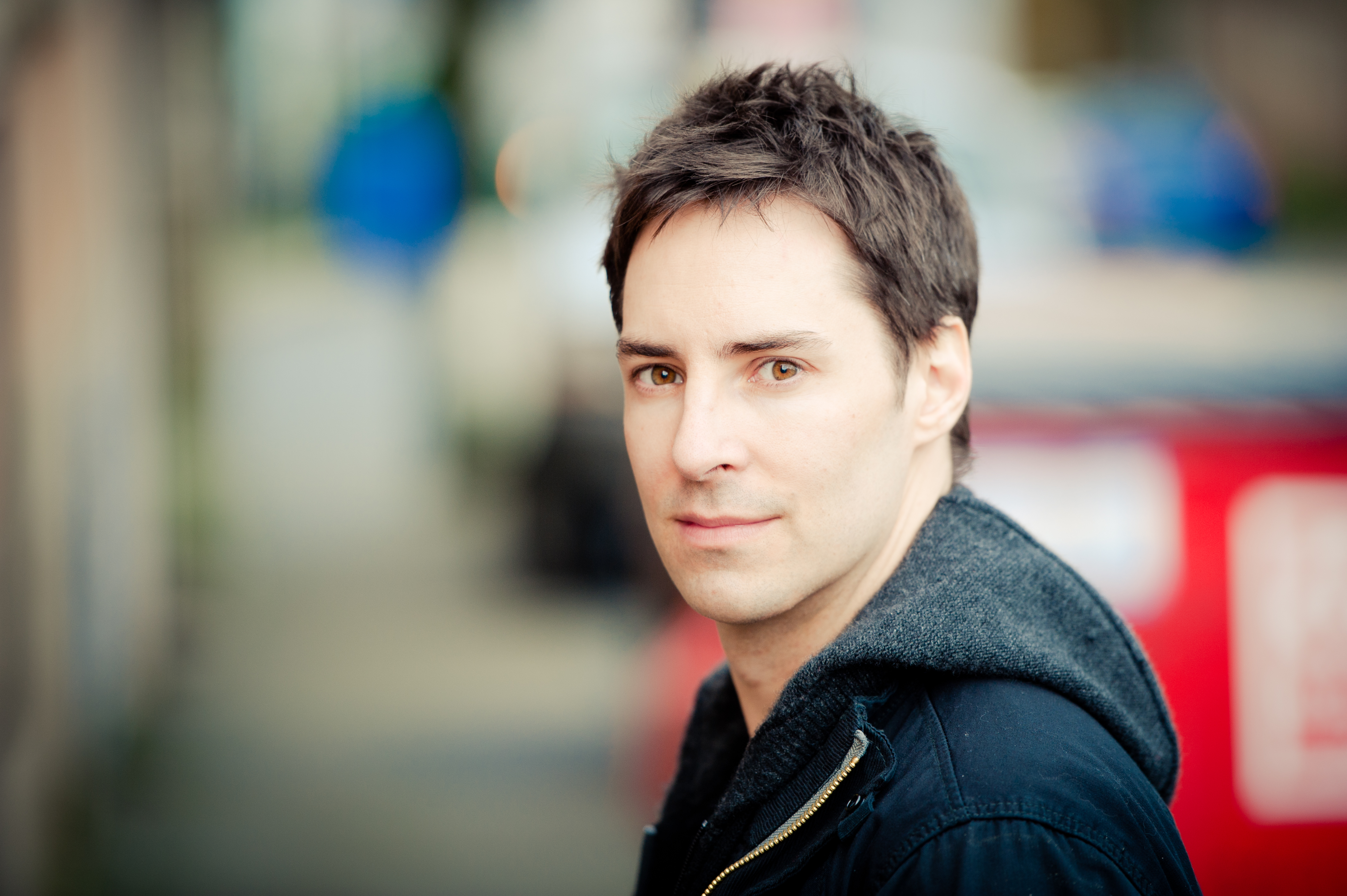
Daniel Ingram in 2012

Most of the film's songs and its score were composed by My Little Pony: Friendship Is Magic songwriter Daniel Ingram, who first announced at GalaCon 2015 that he would be collaborating with a live studio orchestra for the film. On his songwriting for the film, Ingram said, "I had to challenge myself to push beyond what had been done in the TV show; to write bigger, more epic."

At Hasbro's Toy Fair investor presentation on February 17, 2017, the company announced that there would be seven original songs on the soundtrack. All orchestral parts of the score required approximately 5,800 pages of sheet music. Recording for the score began on June 5, 2017, and finished on June 11.

Sia contributed an original song to the film's soundtrack. Danish band Lukas Graham also contributed an original song for the film titled "Off to See the World", which was used in the film's first trailer. Other artists included in the album are American band DNCE and K-pop singer CL.

== Promotion ==
Sia's "Rainbow" was released as a single on September 15, 2017. In a Facebook Live session on September 12, 2017, Twilight Sparkle (voiced by Tara Strong) and Pinkie Pie (voiced by Andrea Libman) announced that the song's music video would be released on Entertainment Weekly's Facebook page on September 14, featuring Sia's regular alter ego played by Maddie Ziegler. Entertainment Weekly released the video later on September 19. "Off to See the World" by Lukas Graham was also released on October 5 as a single.

== Track listing ==
Songs from the film not included on the soundtrack are Rachel Platten's modified cover of "We Got the Beat" by The Go-Go's and the instrumental version of "The Girl from Ipanema" by Stan Getz and João Gilberto. Platten ultimately contributed another song, "Thank You for Being a Friend", which interpolates the 1978 hit by Andrew Gold, to the soundtrack. All tracks after track 7 are left out of the film.

No.	Title	Writer(s)	Performer(s)	Length
1.	"We Got This Together"	Daniel Ingram; Michael Vogel	Rebecca Shoichet; Shannon Chan-Kent; Andrea Libman; Ashleigh Ball; Kazumi Evans; Cathy Weseluck; Tabitha St. Germain; Michelle Creber; Peter New; Phoenix Chamber Choir	3:32
2.	"I'm the Friend You Need"	Ingram; Vogel	Taye Diggs; Chan-Kent; Libman; Ball; Evans; Weseluck; Samuel Vincent; Vincent Tong	2:15
3.	"Time to Be Awesome"	Ingram; Vogel	Zoe Saldaña; Ball; Chan-Kent; Libman; Evans; Weseluck; Max Martini; Mark Oliver; Nicole Oliver	2:54
4.	"One Small Thing"	Ingram; Vogel	Kristin Chenoweth; Chan-Kent; Libman; Ball; Evans; Phoenix Chamber Choir	2:47
5.	"Open Up Your Eyes"	Ingram; Vogel; Meghan McCarthy	Emily Blunt	3:23
6.	"Rainbow"	Sia Furler; Jesse Shatkin; James Notorleva	Sia	3:17
7.	"Off to See the World"	Christopher Brown; Lukas Forchhammer; Morten Jensen; Stefan Forrest; Morten Pilegaard; David Labrel	Lukas Graham	3:04
8.	"Thank You for Being a Friend"	Andrew Gold; Rachel Platten; Mark Nilan Jr.; Paul Blair; Lindy Robbins	Rachel Platten	3:17
9.	"Can You Feel It"	Joe Jonas; Cole Whittle; Sam Hollander; Blair; Nilan; Nate Cyphert	DNCE	2:54
10.	"I'll Chase the Sky"	Blair; Nilan; Shane Stevens; Rob Persaud; Justin Forest	Jessie James Decker	2:52
11.	"No Better Feelin'"	Lee Chae-rin; Blair; Nilan; Dino Zisis; Nick Monson; Toby Lightman; Stevens	CL	2:53
12.	"I'll Be Around"	Palmer Reed; Zisis; Blair; Nilan; Anthony Pavel; Jonathan Pratt; Matthew Richert; Fatima Dahmouh	Palmer Reed	3:49
13.	"Neighsayer"	Lukas Nelson; Stevens; Ruby Amanfu; Nilan; Blair	Lukas Nelson	3:17
Total length:				40:14

== Charts ==
Chart (2017)	Peak position
UK Compilation Albums (Official Charts)	60
UK Soundtrack Albums (Official Charts)	11
US Top Current Album Sales (Billboard)	50
US Kid Albums (Billboard)	4
US Top Soundtracks (Billboard)	10
