= My Little Pony: The Movie (2017 film) =

2017 animated film directed by Jayson Thiessen

- Theatrical release poster
- Directed by: Jayson Thiessen
- Screenplay by: Meghan McCarthy; Rita Hsiao; Michael Vogel
- Story by: Meghan McCarthy; Joe Ballarini
- Based on: My Little Pony: Friendship Is Magic by Lauren Faust; My Little Pony by Bonnie Zacherle
- Produced by: Brian Goldner; Stephen Davis; Marcia Gwendolyn Jones; Haven Alexander
- Starring: Uzo Aduba; Ashleigh Ball; Emily Blunt; Kristin Chenoweth; Taye Diggs; Andrea Libman; Michael Peña; Zoe Saldaña; Liev Schreiber; Sia; Tabitha St. Germain; Tara Strong; Cathy Weseluck
- Cinematography: Anthony Di Ninno
- Edited by: Braden Oberson
- Music by: Daniel Ingram
- Production companies: Allspark Pictures; DHX Media
- Distributed by: Lionsgate
- Release dates: September 24, 2017 (New York City); October 6, 2017 (United States and Canada)
- Running time: 99 minutes
- Countries: United States; Canada
- Language: English
- Budget: $6.5 million
- Box office: $61.3 million

My Little Pony: The Movie is a 2017 animated musical high fantasy film, directed by Jayson Thiessen and based on the animated television series My Little Pony: Friendship Is Magic by Lauren Faust. The film features the show's regular voice cast of Ashleigh Ball, Andrea Libman, Tabitha St. Germain, Tara Strong and Cathy Weseluck, along with Uzo Aduba, Emily Blunt, Kristin Chenoweth, Taye Diggs, Michael Peña, Zoe Saldaña, Liev Schreiber and Sia. The film follows the flying unicorn Twilight Sparkle, her five pony friends—collectively known as the "Mane Six"—and her dragon friend and assistant Spike on a quest to save their home of Equestria from an evil conqueror, the Storm King.

My Little Pony: The Movie was produced by Hasbro's Allspark Pictures and animated at DHX Media's Vancouver division, using traditional animation created using Toon Boom Harmony. The film premiered in New York City on September 24, 2017, and was released in the United States on October 6 by Lionsgate. It received mixed to negative reviews from critics, but was a box-office success, grossing $61.3 million worldwide against a production budget of $6.5 million and becoming Lionsgate's highest-grossing animated feature to date.

== Plot ==
The ponies of Equestria prepare for their first Friendship Festival, overseen by Princess Twilight Sparkle in Canterlot. The festivities are interrupted by an army of monsters commanded by the Unicorn Tempest Shadow, who is ordered by her superior, the Storm King, to capture Equestria's princesses and Twilight and empower his mystical staff with their magic in exchange for restoring her broken horn. Tempest uses magical orbs to petrify Twilight's fellow princesses and mentors Princess Celestia, Princess Luna and Princess Cadance but Twilight escapes with her six friends: Pinkie Pie, Rainbow Dash, Rarity, Applejack, Fluttershy and Spike.

Following incomplete instructions from Celestia, Twilight and her friends set out to find the "queen of the hippo" beyond Equestria. They arrive at the desert city of Klugetown, where they accept an offer by a con artist feline named Capper to escort them to the "hippos", unaware that he intends to sell them to local mob boss Verko as to settle a debt he owes to him. As Capper begins to develop a genuine friendship with them, Twilight discovers a map that reveals the "hippos" to be hippogriffs. Just as they're about to leave, Verko arrives to buy them, exposing Capper's treachery. When Tempest arrives in pursuit of Twilight, the group evades her aboard a delivery airship run by birdlike pirates led by Captain Celaeno, whom Rainbow Dash persuades to take them to the hippogriffs' kingdom on Mount Aris. However, she accidentally gives their location away to Tempest with a Sonic Rainboom, forcing the group to reach Mount Aris in a makeshift hot-air balloon.

While exploring the hippogriffs' deserted kingdom, Twilight's group is led by the seapony Princess Skystar to her home of Seaquestria in an underwater cavern. Skystar reveals her kind to be the hippogriffs, transformed by a magic pearl used by her mother, Queen Novo, to hide from the Storm King and his forces, which she denies giving to the group to use against the Storm King. Twilight, fed up with her friends' carefree antics throughout the journey, attempts to steal it while letting her friends unknowingly distract the seaponies. Her plan backfires when she triggers an alarm right after Pinkie persuades Novo to give them the pearl, resulting in Novo angrily banishing the entire group back to the surface.

Back at the surface, Twilight and her friends get into an argument over her actions, ending with Twilight losing her temper and furiously disowning them as her friends while flaring her horn at Pinkie. Deeply hurt and offended, the group, barring Spike, leave Twilight, unknowingly allowing her to be finally captured by Tempest, who gains her sympathy as she reveals the loss of her own horn as a foal due to an Ursa Minor attack caused her own friends to leave her because of her unstable magic.

Upon learning of her kidnapping from Spike, Twilight's friends immediately spring into action and return to Canterlot to rescue her with the help of a reformed Capper, Celaeno and the pirates, and Skystar, who have followed them after being inspired by their friendship. Using his newly empowered staff, the Storm King conjures a storm against the group and betrays Tempest, whom Twilight saves. Twilight and her friends quickly reconcile and manage to recover the staff, ending the storm. The Storm King hurls a magical orb to petrify the group, but Tempest jumps in his way, petrifying them both. The Storm King falls to the ground and smashes to pieces, while the group uses the staff to revive Tempest, who returns the stolen magic to the princesses, restoring them and repairing the now-damaged city. The Friendship Festival resumes with the ponies celebrating alongside everyone whom Twilight and her friends encountered and befriended on their adventure. Encouraged by Twilight, Tempest joins in by producing a fireworks display with her broken horn, and happily accepts the group's friendship.

== Voice cast ==
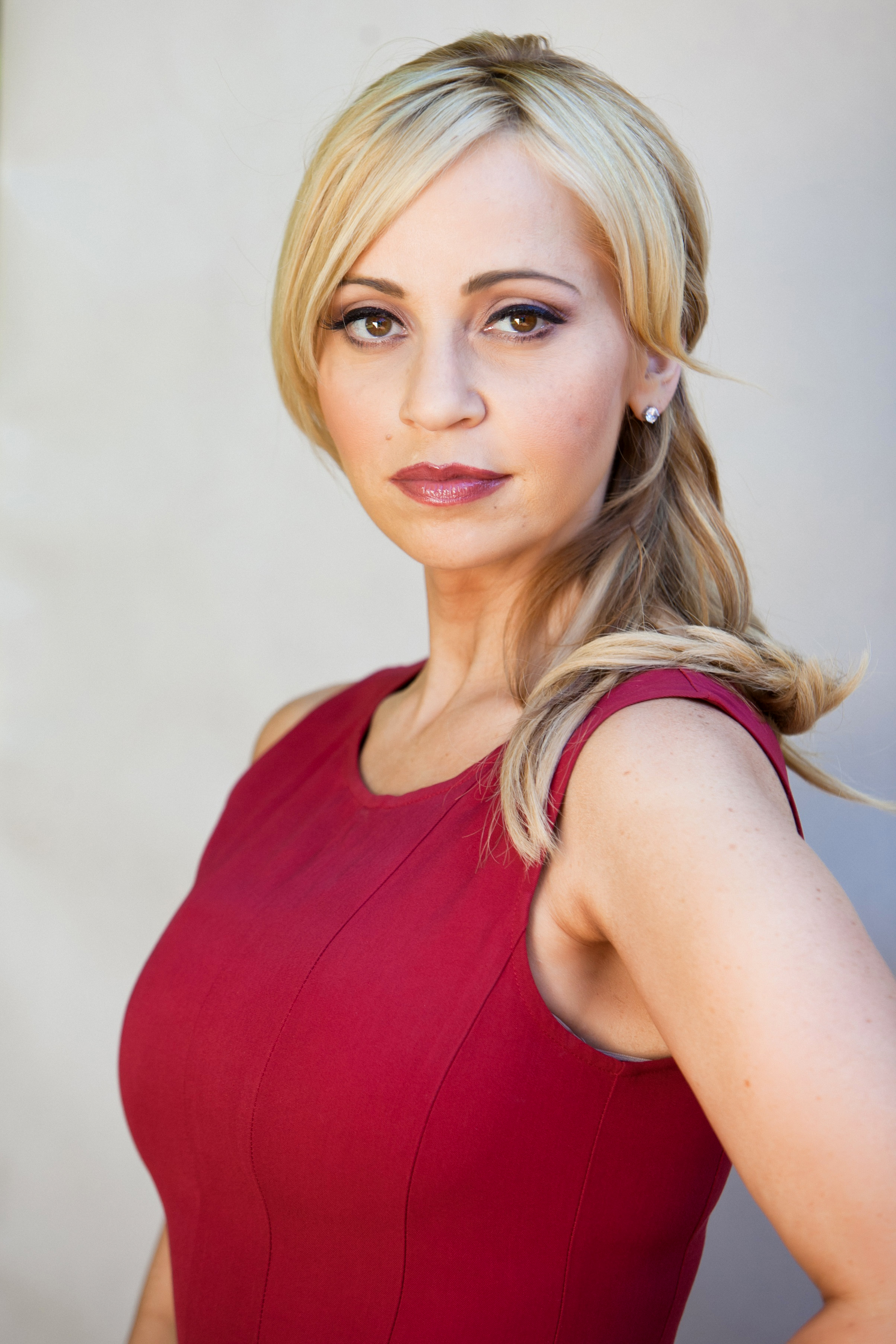
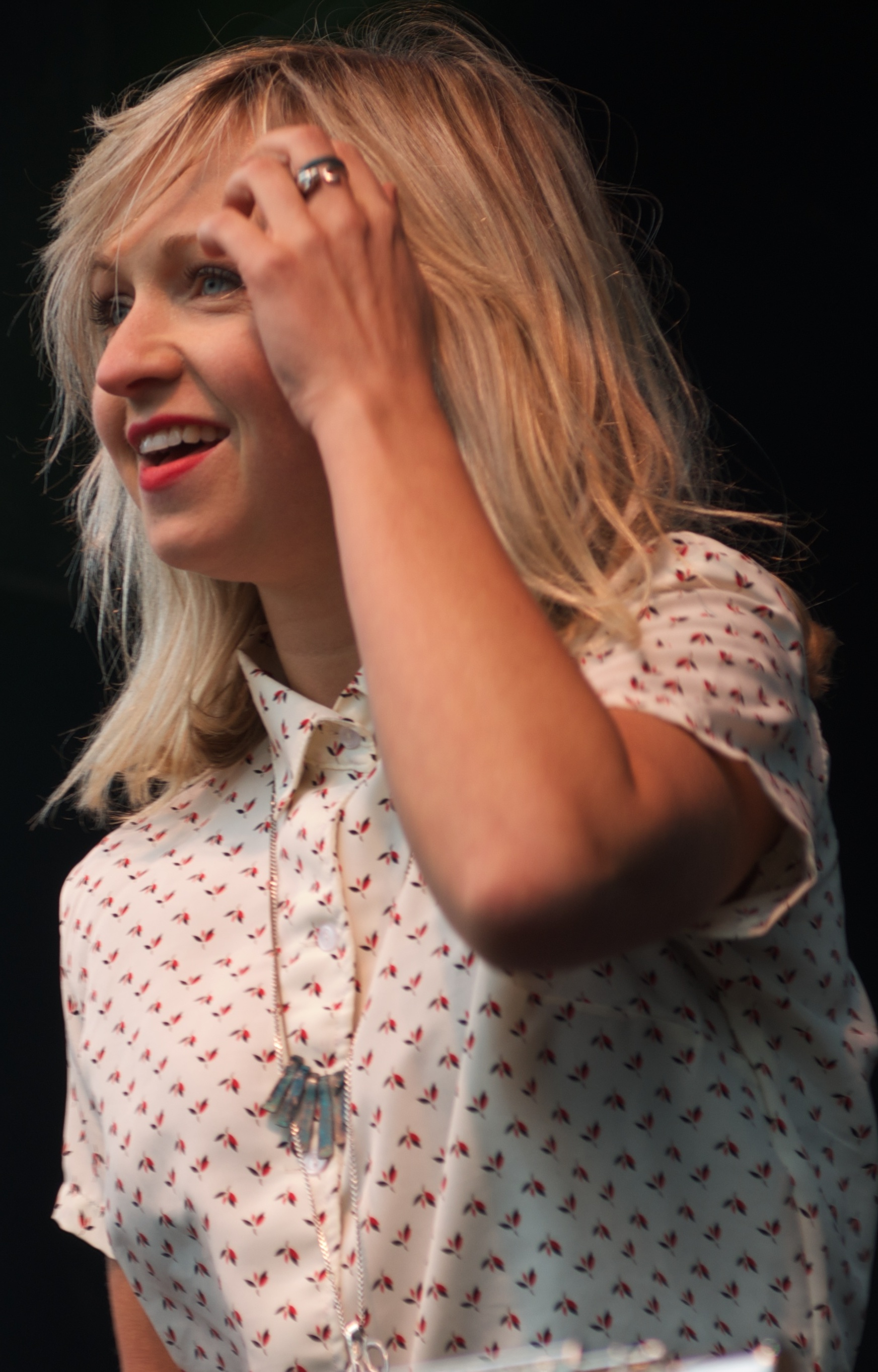
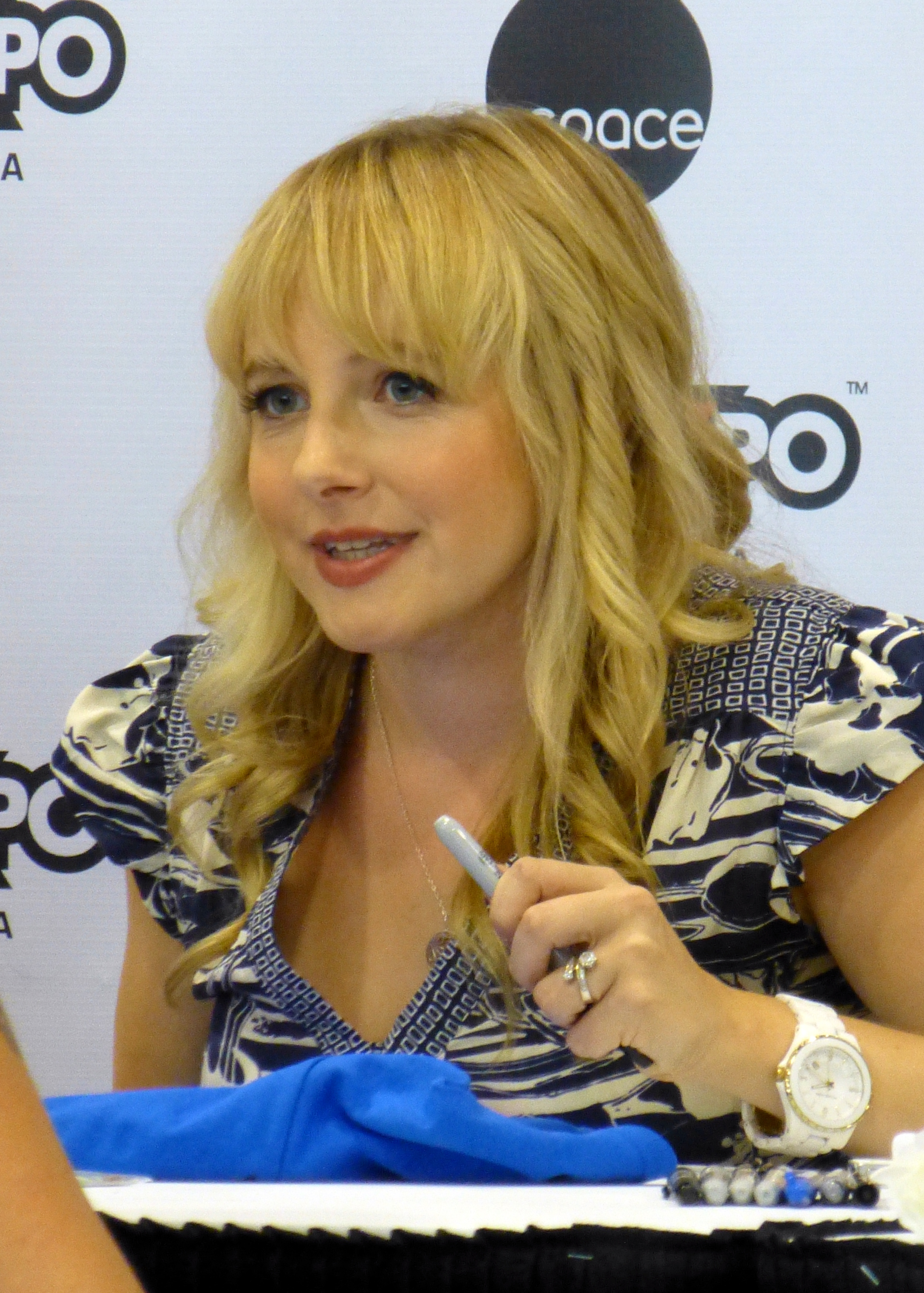
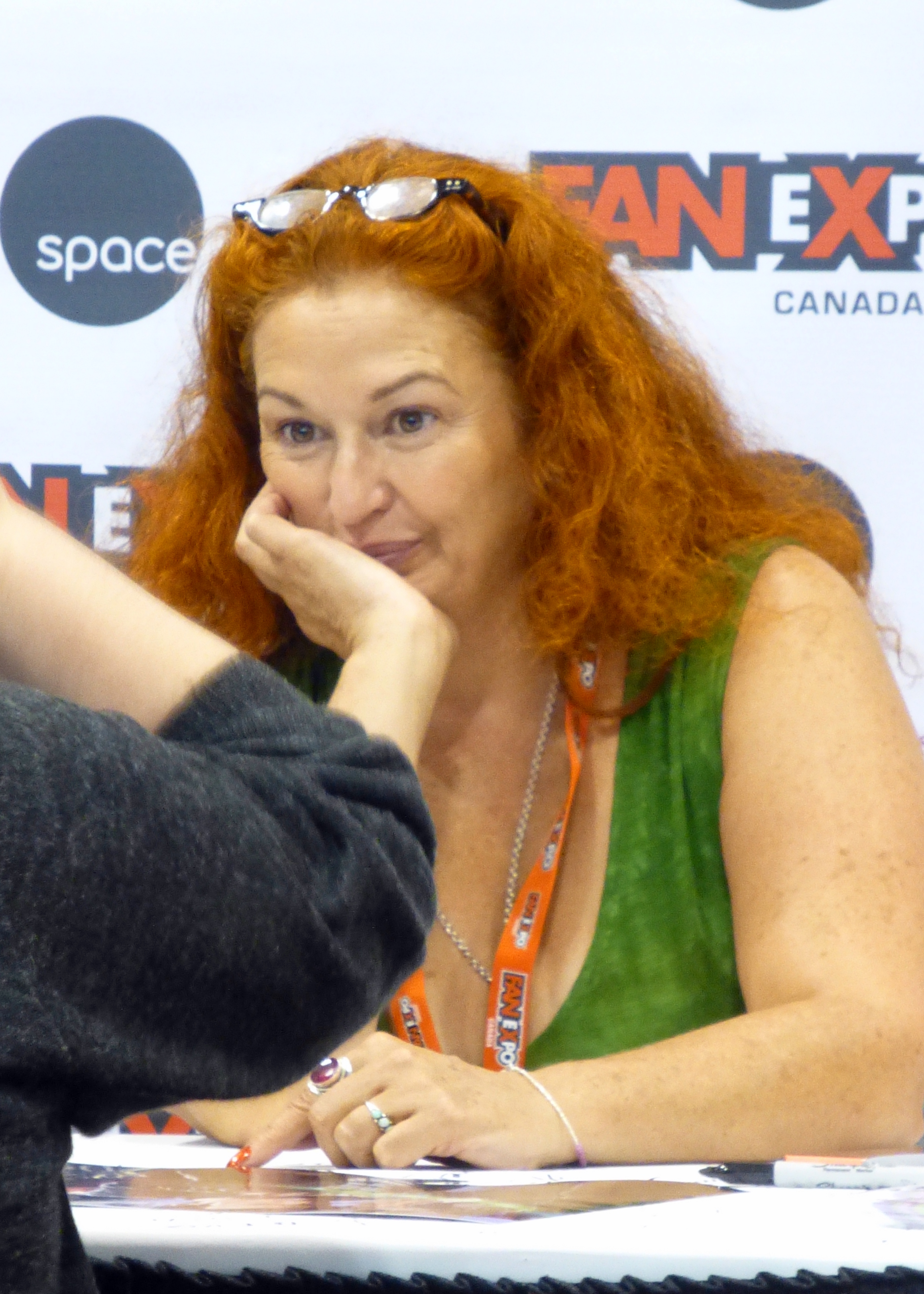
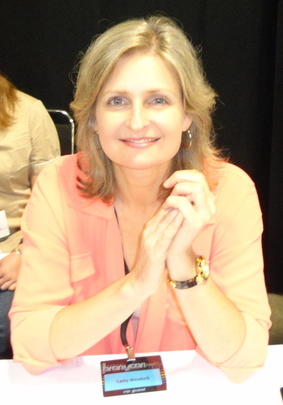
Tara Strong, Ashleigh Ball, Andrea Libman, Tabitha St. Germain and Cathy Weseluck reprised their roles from My Little Pony: Friendship Is Magic.
- Tara Strong as Twilight Sparkle, an intelligent but over-obsessive Alicorn who is responsible for spreading friendship and harmony across the kingdom. She is the leader of the "Mane Six" ponies.
  - Rebecca Shoichet performs Twilight Sparkle's singing voice.
- Ashleigh Ball as Rainbow Dash and Applejack, two members of the "Mane Six"; Rainbow Dash is a sassy and loyal pegasus with a kind heart and a wild sense of humour, and Applejack is an honest apple farmer pony.
- Andrea Libman as Pinkie Pie and Fluttershy, two members of the "Mane Six"; Pinkie Pie is a party-obsessed pony filled with joy and laughter, and Fluttershy is a shy but kind pegasus who cares for animals.
  - Shannon Chan-Kent performs Pinkie Pie's singing voice.
- Tabitha St. Germain as Rarity, a fussy but generous fashion designer unicorn and a member of the "Mane 6".
  - Kazumi Evans performs Rarity's singing voice.
- Cathy Weseluck as Spike, a baby dragon and Twilight Sparkle's assistant.
- Emily Blunt as commander Tempest Shadow / Fizzlepop Berrytwist, an embittered unicorn who serves as the Storm King's second-in-command in order to repair her broken horn. On the development of the character, screenwriter Meghan McCarthy said, "We just arrived at this idea of a character who had come from Equestria, and had not had the positive experience that Twilight [Sparkle] and her friends had. It felt like a good counterpart to our heroes was to have a villain who didn't just not get friendship, but had a reason that she didn't understand it." McCarthy also called Blunt's performance "a big influence" on how the character was animated in the film.
- Kristin Chenoweth as Princess Skystar, an excitable hippogriff and magically transformed seapony princess. Chenoweth said of her character, "Let's just say she's been locked up for a while and is longing for friends." She joked that she dabbled in method acting for the role, making sure her hair was "on point for every recording session".
- Liev Schreiber as the Storm King, the despotic, satyr-like leader of the storm creatures who conquers lands in search of powerful magic to control the weather. On his acceptance of the role, Schreiber said that he wanted something child-friendly for his kids to watch, noting his repertoire of violent, adult-oriented films. Comparing his character to Basil Rathbone, Schreiber said the Storm King "is prone to temper tantrums, and he's a little crazy. He has a wide range of behaviors." He considers the character to be "one of the more intense roles [he's] played".
- Michael Peña as Grubber, a wisecracking and gluttonous hedgehog, Tempest Shadow's cohort and the servant of the Storm King. McCarthy said that Grubber "needed to be goofy" to counterpoint the "very straight-laced, hardcore" Tempest. Peña ad-libbed much of the character's dialogue, with McCarthy saying, "You get Michael Peña in a recording booth, and you just are like, 'Please just go and say funny things.' He will be there for hours, just giving you all kinds of really great material that was not something that we had originally scripted!"
- Sia as Songbird Serenade, a pegasus and famous pop star in Equestria. The character's design is modeled after Sia's likeness.
- Taye Diggs as Capper, an anthropomorphic alley cat who is a cunning yet good-hearted con artist. Diggs, who was excited to appear in an animated film, says, "I'm very movement-oriented, so just looking at the way Capper is positioned, the expressions on his face, all enhances my performance. It's really cool."
- Uzo Aduba as Queen Novo, Princess Skystar's overprotective mother, and the firm but fair and benevolent ruler of the hippogriffs-turned-seaponies. The character is described by Chenoweth as "loving but also a little too strict and stern". Detailing her role, Aduba says, "She [wants] to protect her group to the best of her ability, and [wants] to create a life of peace and stability. She doesn't take any nonsense, and will do everything in her power to protect her family."
- Zoe Saldaña as Captain Celaeno, an anthropomorphic parrot and jaded pirate captain who is relegated to the Storm King's delivery service. Saldana says Celaeno "cares for her crew", adding, "She's a responsible, thoughtful, and empathetic leader. That's a terrific, very poignant message to give to children about leadership—that it's okay for you to want to be a leader as long as you know that the responsibilities that come along with it."

Nicole Oliver, St. Germain and Britt McKillip reprise their respective roles from Friendship Is Magic as Twilight's mentors and fellow alicorn princesses Princess Celestia, Princess Luna and Princess Cadance. St. Germain also voices Granny Smith, Applejack's grandmother, and Muffins, a cross-eyed gray pegasus. Also returning from Friendship is Magic are Michelle Creber and Peter New are Apple Bloom and Big McIntosh, Applejack's younger sister and older brother respectively, Michael Dobson as Bulk Biceps, a muscular pegasus, and Samuel Vincent as Party Favor, a balloonist unicorn.

Adam Bengis voices Code Red, one of the Canterlot ponies. Brian Dobson voices Verko, a mole-rat crime boss in Klugetown to whom Capper is in debt. Max Martini, Mark Oliver and Nicole Oliver respectively perform as three of Captain Celaeno's parrot-like crew: Boyle, first mate Mullet and Lix Spittle. Michael Dobson, Andrew McNee, Tegan Moss, Sabrina Pitre, Rhona Rees and Vincent all feature as assorted citizens of Canterlot. Richard Ian Cox, Michael Dobson, McNee, New and Nicole Oliver also perform as denizens of Klugetown. Additional voices are provided by Alistair Abell, Caitlyn Bairstow, Julia Benson, Christine Chatelain, Brian Dobson, Paul Dobson, Rondel Reynoldson, Jason Simpson, Sarah Troyer and Siobhan Williams.

== Production ==
=== Development ===
At San Diego Comic-Con in 2012, Friendship Is Magic head writer Meghan McCarthy commented on the possibility of a feature film based on the series, saying that it was not in her control whether or not the film would be made. The film was announced on October 20, 2014, with Joe Ballarini attached as screenwriter and McCarthy as co-executive producer. Hasbro Studios president Stephen Davis said of the film that "I think it gives us an opportunity to tell a bigger story, that maybe we [can't] tell on television" and that "[it's] also an opportunity to broaden the franchise". The film was one of the first produced through Hasbro Studios' self-financing film label Allspark Pictures, which also produced the 2015 live-action adaptation of Jem and the Holograms. During PonyCon AU on February 22, 2015 alongside fellow writer Gillian M. Berrow, McCarthy said that the movie would be unrelated to the Equestria Girls spin-off franchise, and that the crew was "going all out on it, to make sure it doesn't just feel like an extended episode".

Series supervising director Jayson Thiessen was confirmed to direct the film while McCarthy was announced to be writing the script. McCarthy was supposed to work on season 5 of the series but left to write the film while Thiessen announced that after the finale to season 5, he would be stepping down as supervising director of the television series in order to work full-time on the film. Michael Vogel, another writer on the series, signed on as co-executive producer alongside McCarthy, with Davis and Hasbro CEO Brian Goldner signing on as producers. Vogel, Ballarini and Rita Hsiao were later announced to be co-writing the film alongside McCarthy.

On April 30, 2016, concept artwork and other information was officially revealed at PonyRadioCon in Moscow; the panel included additional plot details such as the main characters' transformation into "sea ponies" for a portion of the film.

=== Casting ===
The initial Lionsgate announcement listed the principal voice cast of Friendship Is Magic—Tara Strong, Ashleigh Ball, Andrea Libman, Tabitha St. Germain and Cathy Weseluck—reprising their roles alongside actress Kristin Chenoweth as a new character. On February 12, 2016, it was announced that Emily Blunt joined the voice cast. By April 27, 2016, actors Michael Peña and Uzo Aduba were in negotiations to join the cast. On May 16, Liev Schreiber and Taye Diggs were confirmed additions to the cast. On June 20, Ball stated that she had begun recording for the film's songs. At San Diego Comic-Con in July 2016, singer Sia was announced to be portraying a new "pop star pony" character called Songbird Serenade. On January 11, 2017, it was reported by Variety that Zoe Saldaña had joined the cast. Friendship Is Magic voice actress Nicole Oliver confirmed on January 23 that she would also be a part of the film's cast, reprising her role as Princess Celestia.

=== Animation ===
Like the Friendship Is Magic series and earlier Equestria Girls animated spin-off films, the animation for the film was mainly done at DHX Studios Vancouver (specifically, its 2D animation unit) in Canada and outsourced to Top Draw Animation in the Philippines, with additional work from Feitong Cartoon in Mainland China and Copa Studio in Brazil just for this film.

On April 2, 2016, Michel Gagné, after receiving an email from Thiessen, both of whom having worked together on Insanely Twisted Shadow Puppets back in 2004, took an eight-month hiatus from Spider-Man: Into the Spider-Verse and joined the film as special effects lead. In early October 2016, Gagné reported that Nik Gipe was hired onto the film's staff as his assistant. He also mentioned that the film was being animated using Toon Boom Animation's Harmony software rather than the usual Adobe Flash animation software used in the television series as apparently, it was too cheap-looking to be used for a theatrical film. Several crew members, including Thiessen, Gagnè, art director Rebecca Dart, head of story Doron Mier, storyboard artist Jocelan Thiessen, Thiessen's wife, and creative consultant Kevin Munroe, who was also a storyboard artist on the film, said they wanted to add "simple yet impactful changes" to the designs for the big screen, such as depth and shadows for the characters' eyes and ears, and the impression of heart-shaped indentations on the bottom of their hooves, while still keeping the look and feel of the show, which using Toon Boom enabled them to do.

According to cinematographer Anthony Di Ninno, the crew used 3D modeling in Autodesk Maya to determine camera locations, lens, angles, rough lighting, character and prop placement, and which way the characters would be looking and expressing while the composition crew used Toon Boom and Adobe After Effects and the background paint was done in Photoshop. The pre-visualization crew were able to use the 3D backdrops, which became more detailed throughout the film's development, to integrate the 3D character models and test the Toon Boom animations on top of these scenes using the placement established by Maya, speeding up the production.

=== Music ===
The film's official soundtrack was released on September 22, 2017, by RCA Records.

The film's songs and score were composed by Friendship Is Magic songwriter Daniel Ingram, instead of the songs being composed by Ingram and the score being composed by William Anderson. Ingram first announced at GalaCon 2015 that he would be collaborating with a live studio orchestra for the film. On his songwriting for the film, Ingram said, "I had to challenge myself to push beyond what had been done in the TV show; to write bigger, more epic." It was stated through the PonyRadioCon panel that the film would have a total of eight original songs. On November 17, 2015, background score orchestrator Steffan Andrews, who left the series after season 4 ended, had said that he would return to work on the film, but ultimately Andrews was given only a special thanks credit in the final film. At Hasbro's Toy Fair investor presentation on February 17, 2017, it was announced that there would be seven songs. Around 5,800 pages of sheet music were created for all orchestral parts of the score. Recording for the score began at Nashville on June 5, 2017, performed by the Nashville Scoring Orchestra and conducted by David Shipps, and finished on June 11 with additional music written by Caleb Chan and Trevor Hoffman.

Sia contributed an original song to the film, "Rainbow", which was released as a single on September 15, 2017. A music video for the song later released by Entertainment Weekly on September 19. The video was directed by Daniel Askill and features a dance performance by Maddie Ziegler, a previous collaborator with Sia, intercut to scenes from the film. Danish band Lukas Graham also contributed an original song for the film titled "Off to See the World", which was used in the film's first trailer and played over the closing credits. Other artists included in the album are DNCE and CL. The score for the film was released on Spotify on October 7, 2018. It features a song cut from the film titled "Equestria" that was originally going to play in the beginning, but was cut in favor of Rachel Platten's cover of "We Got the Beat".

The film's production wrapped up on July 29, 2017, as announced by Thiessen.

== Release ==
=== Theatrical release ===
On August 7, 2015, Lionsgate announced that they would distribute the film in the United States, and sell distribution rights to the film worldwide except in Mainland China. The film was showcased at the 2016 Cannes Film Festival on May 10 along with eight other Lionsgate features to help sell the film to international distributors.

The film was originally scheduled for release in the United States and Canada on November 3, 2017, but it was subsequently moved up to October 6, 2017. A private premiere screening was held in New York City on September 24, 2017, twelve days prior to the nationwide release date. In Canada, the film was distributed by Entertainment One Films, which had the nationwide rights to Lionsgate films at the time. Theatrically, the film was accompanied by a five-minute animated short from Hasbro Studios' web series Hanazuki: Full of Treasures.

=== Marketing ===
Numerous toys based on characters, sets and props from the film were made by Hasbro, and a vast majority of the products was released on August 1, 2017. The 2016 PonyRadioCon panel included a brief preview for some of the planned merchandise being developed for the film, including T-shirts and graphics. On July 27, 2016, the My Little Pony Collectible Card Game hinted about a new set of cards based on the film. Hasbro's toyline for the film was shown and promoted at Toy Fair 2017 and various other toy conventions.

Several books and comics related to the film have been announced: My Little Pony: Annual 2018, which contains "exclusive content from the My Little Pony movie" was released on August 10, 2017; and a "prequel" story released on August 1. On January 23, 2017, Hachette Book Group listed five different books for the film, all released on August 29, 2017. Books based on the film have been showcased at BookCon 2017 on June 4, with guest appearances by Libman and Ball. IDW Publishing released a four-issue comic book miniseries titled My Little Pony: The Movie Prequel, with the first issue released on June 28, 2017. Viz Media released an art book for the film on August 29, 2017. A comic adaptation based on the film by IDW was released on September 27, 2017.

A teaser trailer for the film was released online on April 6, 2017, and in theaters alongside Smurfs: The Lost Village the following day. The first full trailer debuted online on June 28, 2017, and was released with Despicable Me 3 two days later. Another trailer was released by USA Today online on September 12, 2017. The same day, the official My Little Pony Facebook page hosted a live Q&A stream with two of the movie's characters, Pinkie Pie (voiced by Libman) and Twilight Sparkle (voiced by Strong). Another trailer was played during the twelfth-season finale of America's Got Talent on September 20, 2017. On September 27, 2017, the official My Little Pony Facebook page hosted a live Q&A stream with Dart, who drew a custom artwork of Rainbow Dash (voiced by Ball).

On September 30, 2017, a special titled The Making of My Little Pony: The Movie aired on Discovery Family, a joint venture between Discovery Communications (now Warner Bros. Discovery) and Hasbro; it was watched by 18,000 viewers.

=== Home media ===
My Little Pony: The Movie was released on December 19, 2017 for digital downloads, and was later released on January 9, 2018 for DVD, Blu-ray and On Demand. Its special features includes a deleted scene, a music video for the song "I'm the Friend You Need", a featurette starring Pinkie Pie, two behind the scenes featurettes, an exclusive Equestria Girls animated short, and the Hanazuki: Full of Treasures short bundled with the film's theatrical release.

A home media bundling both this film and the namesake 1986 film was released on October 16, 2018, commemorating the 35th anniversary of the My Little Pony toyline. The releases contain the same bonus features as its DVD/Blu-ray counterparts.

As of April 2018, My Little Pony: The Movie had sold over 200,000 DVD copies and 160,000 Blu-ray copies.

== Reception ==
=== Box office ===
My Little Pony: The Movie grossed $21.9 million in the United States and Canada, and $39.4 million in other territories, for a worldwide total of $61.3 million on a production budget of $6.5 million.

In the United States and Canada, the film was expected to gross between $10 million and $17 million from 2,528 theaters in its opening weekend. It made $3 million on its first day. It ended up opening to $8.9 million, finishing 6th at the box office. Amid Amidi of Cartoon Brew stated that—despite the opening being considered a disappointment—any reasonable return from the film would be seen as positive by Hasbro because it is tied to the toy line. The film dropped 54% in its second weekend, making $4.1 million and falling to 9th.

Its biggest markets outside North America are China with $7.4 million, the United Kingdom with $5 million, Germany with $2.4 million, and Russia with $2.3 million.

=== Critical response ===
On Rotten Tomatoes, the film has an approval percentage of 49% based on 65 reviews. The critics consensus reads: "Charming and sweet, My Little Pony: The Movie will please its dedicated fanbase, even if it's unlikely to encourage non-devotees to gallop along for the ride." On Metacritic, the film has a score of 39 out of 100 based on 13 critic reviews, indicating "generally unfavorable reviews". Audiences polled by CinemaScore gave the film an average grade of "A−" on an A+ to F scale.

RogerEbert.com's Christy Lemire gave the film one and a half stars out of four, comparing its viewing experience to "eating a giant bag of Skittles [and] throwing it all up in a fit of sugar-induced nausea". Katie Walsh of the Los Angeles Times said: "Truthfully, this film feels like four episodes of a cartoon strung together, and there are times, especially during some of the latter musical numbers, where it truly drags." Josh Terry of Deseret News panned the film, saying that parents should "put their money into (buying) some new My Little Pony toys" rather than into getting tickets to see it. Michael Rechtshaffen of The Hollywood Reporter suggested that the film might unseat The Emoji Movie for the distinction of "worst animated feature of the year".

Conversely, Elizabeth Weitzman of TheWrap wrote positively of the film, saying that the film, "Like its television predecessor, is all dressed up in bubbles and cupcakes and rainbows. But it's so jam-packed with rousing girl power, it passes the Bechdel Test with (literally) flying colors." Amy Nicholson of Variety called the film "at once clichéd and exceptional", praising its female characters and "emotionally wise" story.

=== Accolades ===
Award	Date of ceremony	Category	Recipients	Result	Ref.
1.4 Awards	2021	Animation	Tara Strong	Won	
Behind the Voice Actors Awards	2018	Best Vocal Ensemble in a Feature Film	My Little Pony: The Movie	Nominated	
Behind the Voice Actors Awards	2018	Best Female Lead Vocal Performance in a Feature Film	Ashleigh Ball	Nominated	
Behind the Voice Actors Awards	2018	Best Female Lead Vocal Performance in a Feature Film	Emily Blunt	Nominated	
Behind the Voice Actors Awards	2018	Best Female Lead Vocal Performance in a Feature Film	Tara Strong	Nominated	
Behind the Voice Actors Awards	2018	Best Female Vocal Performance in a Feature Film in a Supporting Role	Uzo Aduba	Nominated	
Davey Awards	2017	Best Home Page Website	My Little Pony: The Movie	Won	
Muse Creative Awards	2018	WEBSITE	My Little Pony: The Movie	Won	
ReFrame	2018	Narrative & Animated Feature	My Little Pony: The Movie	Won	
UBCP/ACTRA Awards	2018	Best Voice	Andrea Libman	Nominated	
Vega Digital Awards	2018	Website – Music, Movie and Film	My Little Pony: The Movie	Won	

== See also ==
- List of films about horses
