= A Canterlot Wedding =

My Little Pony: Friendship is Magic episodes

- My Little Pony: Friendship Is Magic episodes
- Pinkie Pie (back) and Twilight Sparkle (front) fighting the Changelings
- Episode nos.: Season 2 Episodes 25 and 26
- Directed by: James Wootton
- Written by: Meghan McCarthy
- Editing by: Mark Kuehnel; Rob Renzetti (story)
- Original air date: April 21, 2012
- Running time: 44 minutes (combined)

Episode chronology
| ← Previous "MMMystery on the Friendship Express" | Next → "The Crystal Empire" |
- My Little Pony: Friendship Is Magic season 2

"A Canterlot Wedding" is the title of the twenty-fifth and twenty-sixth episodes of the second season of the animated television series My Little Pony: Friendship Is Magic. The fifty-first and fifty-second episodes overall, they were directed by James Wootton and written by Meghan McCarthy. "A Canterlot Wedding" premiered as an hour-long event on The Hub on April 21, 2012. In these episodes, Twilight Sparkle (Tara Strong) learns that her brother, Shining Armor (Andrew Francis), will be marrying Princess Cadance (Britt McKillip). The news excites Twilight, but she becomes concerned about the marriage when she notices Cadance is not behaving like the friendly, caring individual she remembers her to be.

"A Canterlot Wedding" was series developer Lauren Faust's final involvement in the show. The episodes are a direct reference to the wedding of Prince William and Catherine Middleton. They deal with themes that have been considered serious and complex for a children's television series; scholars believe that they involve feminism-related themes. Before the premiere of "A Canterlot Wedding", The Hub began a major marketing campaign that included interactive content on the network's website, promotional events, and a print advertisement in The New York Times in the form of a ceremonial wedding announcement. The episodes' debuts attracted almost one million combined viewers, and critics praised their ambition, music, and visual sequences.

== Plot ==
External videos
- A Canterlot Wedding: Parts 1 & 2 (full episode) — Official upload of the episode onto YouTube

=== Part 1 ===
Twilight Sparkle is surprised to learn her older brother, Captain of the Royal Guard Shining Armor, is to be married to Princess Cadance. Princess Celestia, her mentor and the ruler of Equestria, has asked Twilight and her friends from Ponyville to help organize the ceremony. Twilight is resentful, as she had only learned of the marriage at this late date and received a letter instead of a visit. When at Canterlot, she finds security has been increased; a magic shield-spell cast by Shining Armor protects the entire city from an unknown threat.

Twilight berates her brother; he apologizes and asks Twilight to be his "best mare", to her delight. Shining Armor reveals he is marrying her "foalsitter" Princess Cadance, further cheering up Twilight. She meets a cold and distant Cadance who has no memory of a special rhyme they used to share. During the wedding preparations, Twilight further distrusts Cadance, as she criticizes every aspect of her friends' planning. As pressure from the ceremony mounts, Twilight's friends dismiss her claims about Cadance's poor behavior, saying Cadance is just stressed. Twilight approaches Shining Armor with her concerns, but Cadance takes him aside, casting a seemingly evil spell upon him.

The next day, at a wedding rehearsal, Twilight decries Cadance as evil, causing Cadance to run off in tears. An enraged Shining Armor explains that Cadance is being rude due to pressure from the wedding planning and the spell she cast on him was meant to help him deal with the migraines caused by the casting of the shield. He dismisses Twilight as his best mare, claiming she shouldn't come to the wedding at all, and he, Celestia and Twilight's friends, who also refuse to believe her, leave her alone to go check on Cadance, who arrives to comfort Twilight. When Twilight tries to apologize, Cadance transports her beneath Canterlot.

=== Part 2 ===
Twilight finds herself in the long-forgotten crystal caves beneath Canterlot, where images of Cadance taunt her, saying that the marriage will continue without Twilight's interference. Twilight shatters a crystal wall, revealing a disheveled Cadance, who she then furiously attacks. However, the second Cadance reveals herself to be the real Cadance by reciting the shared rhyme from their youth, and explains she was abducted by an impostor who wants to marry Shining Armor. While the fake Cadance plots against Shining Armor and the others, Twilight and Cadance desperately try to escape to stop the wedding.

Just before the ceremony is completed, Twilight and the real Cadance expose the deception. Enraged, the fake Cadance reveals her true image as Queen Chrysalis, (Note: Queen Chrysalis is not named this in the episode and only referred to as "Queen of the Changelings", but official media since the broadcast, such as the first four issues of the comic book series, used this name. She is later referred to by this name in season 5 episode "The Cutie Re-Mark – Part 1".) ruler of the shape-shifting, insect-like Changelings who feed on love. Queen Chrysalis says that she has been usurping Shining Armor's power, weakening the shield to allow her Changeling army to invade Canterlot and take over Equestria. Celestia, who is overpowered by Chrysalis, implores Twilight and her friends to retrieve the Elements of Harmony to stop the Changelings. However, while they battle the evil army, they are captured and are returned to Chrysalis. As the queen celebrates her victory, Twilight frees Cadance, who frees Shining Armor from Chrysalis's spell. He recasts the shield, expelling Chrysalis and her army from Canterlot.

Celestia commends Twilight's conviction that ultimately saved the day. The real wedding goes ahead as planned; Twilight, who again becomes best mare, eagerly oversees preparations for a much more appreciative Cadance. After the wedding ceremony, a celebration with Twilight as the wedding singer ensues.

== Production and promotion ==
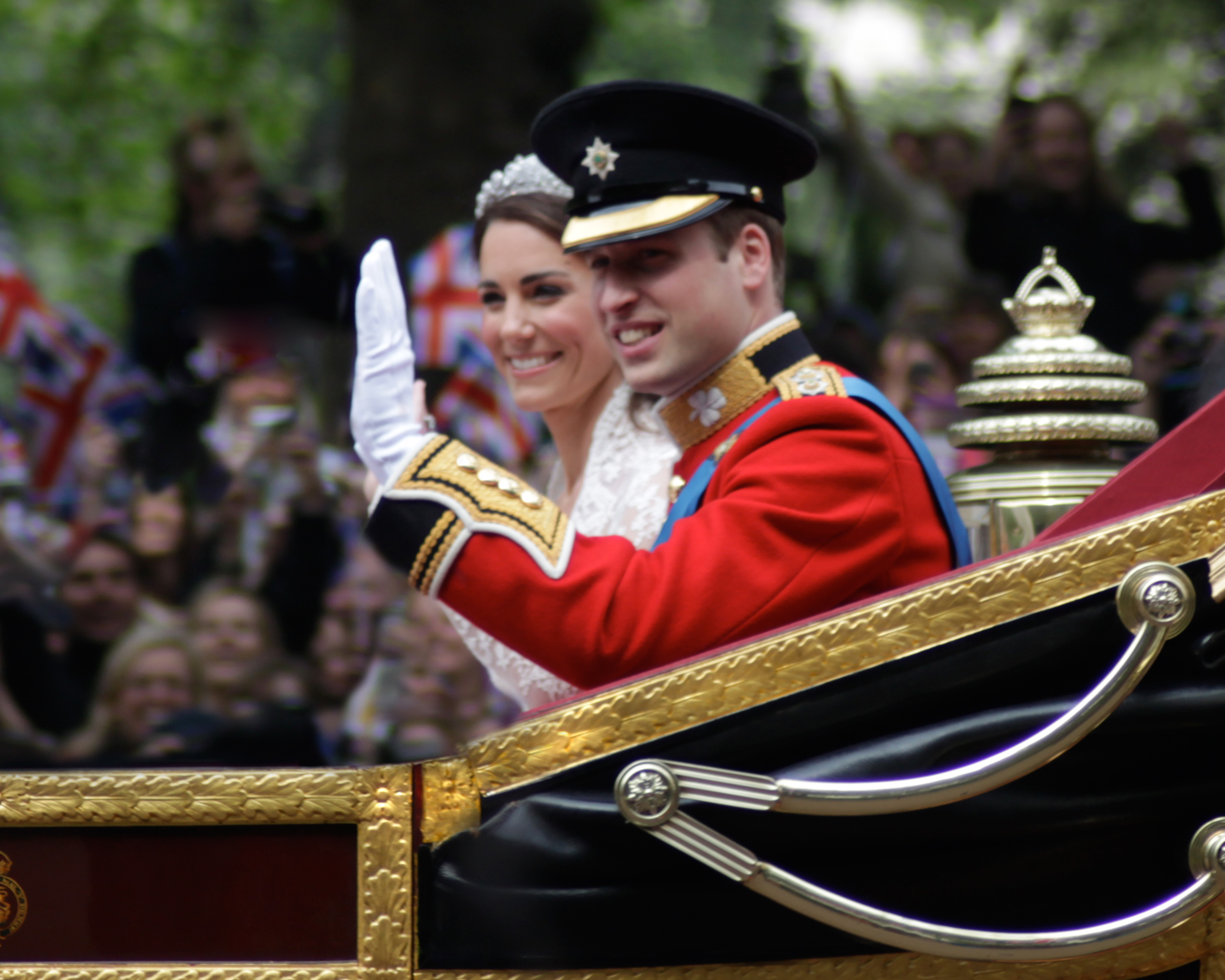
"A Canterlot Wedding" directly references the royal wedding of Prince William and Catherine Middleton that occurred a year before the episodes' airing.

"A Canterlot Wedding" was series developer Lauren Faust's final involvement with the show. Faust had served as executive producer during season one and as consulting producer during season two. The episodes are a direct reference to the wedding of Prince William and Catherine Middleton. Queen Chrysalis was designed by Rebecca Dart from DHX Media: the character was envisioned as damp, hunched over, weak, and rotten-looking; and "like she crawled out from under a log". Hasbro felt that Dart's design was not intimidating enough, so Dart gave her an upright stance to appear more commanding. To give Queen Chrysalis an insect-like appearance, holes are abundant in the character's design. Her decaying aspects are deliberate contrasts to the vigor of Princess Celestia and Cadance. Shining Armor and Cadance are intended to display strength, honor, and fearlessness.

An advertisement formally announcing the marriage of Princess Cadance and Shining Armor was placed in The New York Times' wedding section on April 13, 2012, and McCarthy said the advertisement was placed because the channel wanted to "justify something big and crazy and exciting". Actor and wedding aficionado Tori Spelling appeared at promotional events for "A Canterlot Wedding" and in segments aired on The Hub during the episodes. Spelling, who was scheduled to host a "bridle shower" event in Culver City the week before the episodes' airing, canceled due to pregnancy sicknesses and television personality Brooke Burke took her place.

== Themes ==
The episodes have been subject to feminist analysis. In a chapter of Orienting Feminism, Kevin Fletcher said the episodes both exemplify and resist "princess culture", and suggested they undermine the typical fairy-tale wedding by focusing on Twilight and her friends rather than the royal couple. He stated that Chrysalis's "disordered female behaviour", perceived to be similar to that of evil Disney queens, lends itself to retrogressive interpretations. According to academic and feminist Joanna Russ, matriarchal societies in science fiction are frequently modeled after termites. Fletcher asserted that the function of "A Canterlot Wedding" as retrogressive episodes is enhanced by these components. He believed creators were aware of the post-feminist concept of "having it all"—a rhetoric spawned by post-feminist texts that portray work and social connection as binary options—with the reprise of "This Day Aria" showcasing this awareness. The post-feminist agenda of "having it all", according to Fletcher, is thus deemed harmful since it is linked to an evil queen figure. A study by Christian Valiente and Xeno Rasmusson found the episodes challenge gender stereotypes; females drive the action and dialogue while males are either incompetent or under female control. Females are also in positions of authority, and in primary and active roles.

== Broadcast and reception ==
=== Ratings ===
Both parts of "A Canterlot Wedding" premiered on The Hub in the United States on April 21, 2012. Several sources noted their broadcast was close to the first anniversary of the marriage of Prince William and Catherine Middleton. According to Hasbro, the episodes became rating successes. The first part received a viewership of 483,000, over 300% higher than the ratings of the previous year. The second was watched by 475,000 people, and received a 157% increase in viewership.

=== Responses ===
"A Canterlot Wedding" received positive reviews. Emily St. James gave the double episode an "A−" rating, considering it to be a reason why she felt Friendship Is Magic was one of the best children's programs. Articles in the New York Daily News and Entertainment Weekly described the episodes as "charming and surprisingly complex" and "ambitious, absorbing, and thoroughly entertaining". Journalists have praised "A Canterlot Wedding"'s themes, describing them as serious, complex, and mature for a children's television series. Common Sense Media writer Emily Ashby called the episodes "an illustrator of life lessons that have value for kids of all ages". According to Shaun Scotellaro, founder of fan site Equestria Daily, Cadance was initially criticized by Friendship Is Magic fans for being a "pretty pink alicorn princess"—which was "the exact opposite of what we wanted"—but in the end the show's fans enjoyed the episode, and Scotellaro described it as "perfect".

St. James and Sherilyn Connelly of SF Weekly called the music "one of the best things about this show" and "just breathtaking", respectively. Reviewers often singled out "This Day Aria" for particular acclaim. Connelly considered it to be showstopping, and approvingly likened it to "La Resistance" from South Park: Bigger, Longer & Uncut and "Walk Through the Fire" from Buffy the Vampire Slayer. St. James favorably compared it to the Disney villain songs; similarly, Comic Book Resources's Rae Grimes cited the song's resemblance to Disney musical numbers, stating it "easily takes the cake as the best song in the entire [of Friendship Is Magic]. ... [I]t's on another level compared to the music in the rest of the series."

Critics also praised the episodes' visual sequences. St. James complimented the way "the bright colors and beautiful backgrounds contrast nicely with the more simplistic Flash animation that drives the program". Multiple writers enjoyed the fight between the ponies and the Changelings: Connelly found it thrilling, especially Pinkie Pie's use of Twilight as a gun; and St. James considered it to be vibrant and pleasurable. Other sequences singled out by critics include the "bouncy and fun, filled with real joy and heart" wedding; the climax in which Cadance and Shining Armour defeat the Changelings that "gets [Connelly] gooey inside every time"; and the scene in which Cadance transports Twilight to the caves, which Connelly described as "the most disturbing the show has yet produced".

== Home media release ==
On August 7, 2012, Shout! Factory released a DVD compilation titled "Royal Pony Wedding" containing both parts of "A Canterlot Wedding". They were also released as part of the Season 2 DVD box set.
