= Off to See the World =

Single by Lukas Graham

from the album My Little Pony: The Movie (Original Motion Picture Soundtrack)
- Released: 5 October 2017
- Length: 3:04
- Label: RCA; Warner Bros.
- Songwriters: Christopher Brown; Lukas Forchhammer; Morten Jensen; Stefan Forrest; Morten Pilegaard; David Labrel
- Producer: Lukas Graham

Lukas Graham singles chronology
"Take the World by Storm" (2016)	"Off to See the World" (2017)	"Holder Fast" (2018)

"Off to See the World" is a song by Danish pop and soul band Lukas Graham. It was released on 5 October 2017 as the second single from the animated film My Little Pony: The Movie soundtrack. The song was written by Christopher Brown, Lukas Forchhammer, Morten Jensen, Stefan Forrest, Morten Pilegaard and David Labrel. The song peaked at number 9 on the Danish Singles Chart and was later used in an episode of NBC's Better Late Than Never.

== Charts ==
Chart (2017)	Peak position
Denmark (Tracklisten)	9
Denmark Airplay (Tracklisten)	1

== Certifications ==
Region	Certification	Certified units/sales
Denmark (IFPI Danmark)	Platinum	90,000^{‡}
^{‡} Sales+streaming figures based on certification alone.

== Release history ==
Region	Date	Format	Label
Denmark	5 October 2017	Digital download	Copenhagen; Warner Bros.

== See also ==
- "Rainbow"
- "This Day Aria"
