= Rainbow (Sia song) =

Single by Sia

from the album My Little Pony: The Movie (Original Motion Picture Soundtrack)
- Released: 15 September 2017
- Studio: The Ribcage (Los Angeles)
- Genre: Pop
- Length: 3:17
- Label: RCA
- Songwriters: Sia Furler; Jesse Shatkin; James Vincent Notorleva
- Producer: Jesse Shatkin

Sia singles chronology
| "Dusk Till Dawn" (2017) | "Rainbow" (2017) | "Santa's Coming for Us" (2017) |

"Rainbow" is a song by Australian singer Sia, released on 15 September 2017 as the lead single from the animated film My Little Pony: The Movie soundtrack. In the film, the song is performed by a pop singer pegasus named Songbird Serenade (voiced by Sia). The lyric penned by James Vincent Notorleva (JIM), "I can see a rainbow / in your tears / as they're falling down", has inspired the makeup trend of "rainbow tears".

== Music video ==
The music video for "Rainbow" was released on 19 September 2017. The video was directed by Daniel Askill and features Maddie Ziegler with choreography by Ryan Heffington. The video cuts between footage of Songbird Serenade performing for a large crowd and Ziegler dancing only on a stage covered by a thin strip of water, wearing a wig resembling Songbird Serenade's mane, and successfully fighting and conquering the elements.

== Reception ==
"Rainbow" received critical praise. Bryan Rolli from Billboard called the song "uplifting", explaining "The Australian pop star eschews the vocal acrobatics of past hits like 'Chandelier' in favor of a restrained hook and hypnotic beat, while still sounding as powerful and inspired as ever. She maintains the evenhanded, optimistic spirit that elevates her best songs, singing, 'I can see a rainbow in your tears as the sun comes out.'" Hilary Hughes from MTV said, "'Rainbow' has all the hallmarks of a stellar Sia single: Empowering message, driving beat, and an infectiously catchy melody." Gabriella Ginsberg from Hollywood Life said the song was "simply gorgeous".

== Release history ==
"Rainbow" release history
| Region | Date | Format(s) | Label(s) | Ref. |
|---|---|---|---|---|
| Various | September 15, 2017 | Digital download; streaming | RCA | |

== See also ==
- "Off to See the World"
- "This Day Aria"
