= Daniel Ingram (composer) =

Canadian composer (born 1975)

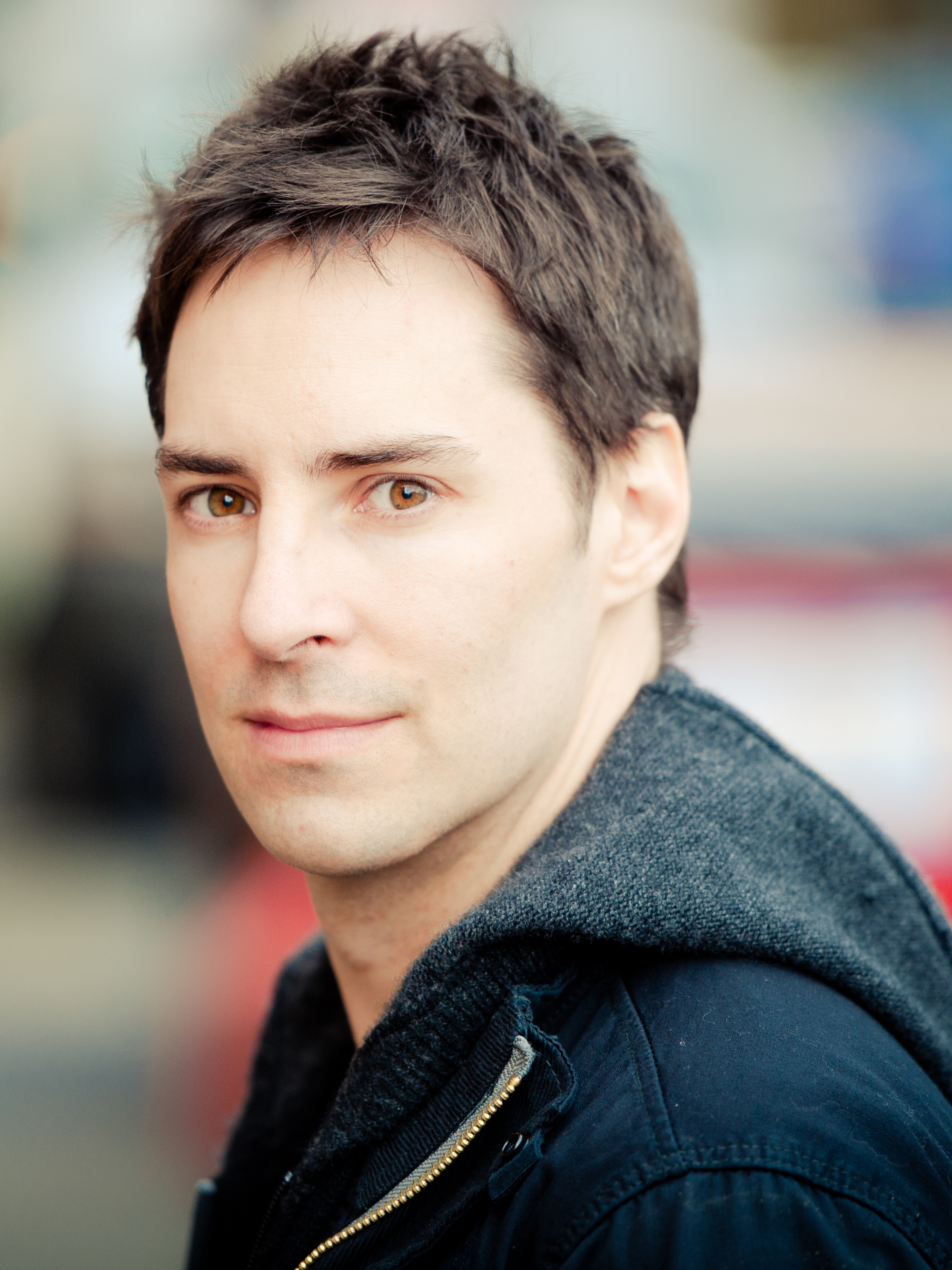
- Ingram in 2012

Background information
- Born: Daniel Luke Ingram; June 13, 1975 (age 51); Vancouver, British Columbia, Canada
- Genres: Film and television scores, musical
- Occupations: Composer, lyricist

Daniel Luke Ingram (born June 13, 1975) is a Canadian composer and lyricist, primarily for animated series soundtracks. He has written more than 200 songs for television, in genres ranging from pop and classic rock to large-scale Broadway-style musical theater. His music has been heard in 180 countries. He is mostly known for his work as the songwriter of My Little Pony: Friendship Is Magic and the films based on the series. He has written over 80 songs for My Little Pony during much of the franchise's fourth generation.

Ingram has received several awards for his music. Between 2012 and 2017, he has been nominated for five Daytime Emmy Awards for Outstanding Original Song in a Children's or Animated Series. "Becoming Popular (The Pony Every Pony Should Know)" and "May The Best Pet Win" from My Little Pony: Friendship Is Magic were nominated in 2012, while "The Magic Inside" and "Legend of Everfree" were nominated in 2016 and 2017 and "If You're A Guy" from Littlest Pet Shop was nominated in 2013. He received a 2010 Leo Award for Best Music in an Animated Series for Martha Speaks, the 2008 Leo Award for Best Music in a Variety Television Show for About a Girl, and the 2013 Leo Award for Best Musical Score in an Animation along with Steffan Andrews for his work in the Friendship Is Magic episode "Magical Mystery Cure". He has also been featured in Rolling Stone for his work on My Little Pony. Ingram described both Alan Menken and Randy Newman as an influence on his work.

== Filmography ==
=== Web production ===
- #TweetIt: Featuring My Little Pony Staff and Bronies - Himself
- Rainbow Rocks: Music to My Ears - Animated Short (Composer)
- Rainbow Rocks: Shake Your Tail - Animated Short / Music Video (Composer)
- Rainbow Rocks: Perfect Day for Fun - Animated Short / Music Video (Composer/Writer) (Note: Writing collaboration with Amy Keating Rogers.)
- Rainbow Rocks: Friendship Through the Ages - Animated Short / Music Video (Composer/Writer) (Note: Writing collaboration with Katrina Hadley, Brian Lenard, Jayson Thiessen, and Michael Vogel.)
- Rainbow Rocks: Life is a Runway - Animated Short / Music Video (Composer/Writer) (Note: Writing collaboration with Katrina Hadley, Brian Lenard, Jayson Thiessen, and Michael Vogel.)
- Rainbow Rocks: My Past is Not Today - Animated Short / Music Video (Composer/Writer) (Note: Writing collaboration with Katrina Hadley, Brian Lenard, Jayson Thiessen, and Michael Vogel.)
- Equestria Girls: Good Vibes - Animated Short / Music Video (Composer/Writer)
- Power of We Club: web series / segments as part of Sesame Street (Composer)
- Dandy's World: Queens of Mischief - Music Video (Composer)

=== Television scores ===
- Martha Speaks, Seasons 1–4 (Composer)
- Pound Puppies, Seasons 1 & 2 (Composer and infrequent Songwriter)
- The Adventures of Chuck and Friends, Seasons 1 & 2 (Songwriter)
- My Little Pony: Equestria Girls – Dance Magic (Songwriter)
- My Little Pony: Friendship Is Magic, Seasons 1–9 (Songwriter, Composer)
- Littlest Pet Shop (Composer, Songwriter)
- We're Lalaloopsy (Composer, Songwriter)
- Strawberry Shortcake: Berry in the Big City (Composer, Songwriter)
- On Screen!, Seasons 1–3 (Composer)
- The Math Show (Composer)
- Leroy Dorsalfin (Composer)
- About a Girl, Season 1 (Composer)
- Ricky Sprocket, Season 1 (Additional Music)
- Empty Arms (Composer)
- The Older I Get the Wiser I Get (Composer)
- A Daughter's Conviction (Additional Music)
- Imaginary Playmate (Additional Music)
- Last Chance Café (Additional Music)
- Pucca, Season 1 (Additional Music)
- EARTH = Home (Additional Music)
- Children of Tsunami: No More Tears (Composer)
- Return of the Tall Ships (Composer)
- Nobody TV movie (Additional Music)
- Clang Invasion (Composer)

=== Film scores ===
- My Little Pony: The Movie (Composer/Songwriter)
- My Little Pony: Equestria Girls (Songwriter)
- My Little Pony: Equestria Girls – Rainbow Rocks (Songwriter)
- My Little Pony: Equestria Girls – Friendship Games (Songwriter)
- My Little Pony: Equestria Girls – Legend of Everfree (Songwriter)
- Love Notes TV movie (Composer)
- To Be Fat Like Me TV movie (Additional Music)
- Kung Fu Magoo (Composer)

=== Video games ===
- Billie Bust Up (Note: Pre-production; scheduled for a 2024 release.) (Composer)

== Voice acting ==
- My Little Pony: Friendship Is Magic - Tourist Pony 2 (episode: "Rarity Takes Manehattan") (uncredited cameo)

== Music supervision and editing ==
- The Week the Women Went, Season 2
- Combat School, Season 1
- Ricky Sprocket, Season 1
- Crash Test Mommy, Seasons 2 - 4
- Pucca, Season 1
- Stunt Dawgs, Season 1
- The Stagers, Seasons 1 - 2
- Second Sight, TV movie

== Awards and nominations ==
- 2008 Leo Award for Best Musical Score in a Music, Comedy, or Variety Program or Series (About a Girl , winner)
- 2009 Leo Award for Best Musical Score in an Animation Program or Series (Martha Speaks, nominee)
- 2010 Leo Award for Best Musical Score in an Animation Program or Series (Martha Speaks, winner)
- 2012 Daytime Emmy Award for Outstanding Original Song in a Children's or Animated Series ("May The Best Pet Win" - My Little Pony: Friendship Is Magic, nominee)
- 2012 Daytime Emmy Award for Outstanding Original Song in a Children's or Animated Series ("Becoming Popular (The Pony Every Pony Should Know)" - My Little Pony: Friendship is Magic, nominee)
- 2013 Leo Award for Best Musical Score in an Animation Program or Series ("Magical Mystery Cure" - My Little Pony: Friendship Is Magic, winner)
- 2013 Daytime Emmy Award for Outstanding Original Song in a Children's or Animated Series ("If You're A Guy" - Littlest Pet Shop, nominee)
- 2014 Leo Award for Best Musical Score in an Animation Program or Series ("Pinkie Pride" - My Little Pony: Friendship Is Magic, nominee)
- 2016 Daytime Emmy Award for Outstanding Original Song in a Non-Drama Series ("The Magic Inside" - My Little Pony: Friendship Is Magic, nominee)
- 2016 Leo Award for Best Musical Score in an Animation Program or Series ("Nina's Birthday" - Nina's World with Caleb Chan, nominee)
- 2016 Leo Award for Best Musical Score in an Animation Program or Series ("Crusaders of the Lost Mark" - My Little Pony: Friendship Is Magic, winner)
- 2017 Leo Award for Best Musical Score in an Animation Program or Series ("A Hearth's Warming Tail" - My Little Pony: Friendship Is Magic with Caleb Chan, nominee)
- 2017 Daytime Emmy Award for Outstanding Original Song in a Non-Drama Series ("Legend of Everfree" - My Little Pony: Equestria Girls – Legend of Everfree, nominee)
