= Gilda (given name) =

Gilda is a given name.

== People with the stage name or alias ==
- Gilda (Argentine singer) (1961–1996), Argentine singer and songwriter born Miriam Alejandra Bianchi
- Gilda (Italian singer) (born 1950), Italian singer, winner of the 1975 Sanremo Music Festival
- Gilda Jovine, modelling name of Gilda Gross (born 1981), Dominican beauty pageant titleholder, actress and model
- Gilda Mignonette, stage name of Griselda Andreatini (1890–1953), Neapolitan singer

== People with the given name ==
- Gilda Aranda (born 1933), Mexican former Olympic sports swimmer
- Gilda Barabino (born 1956), American academic
- Gilda Bolt-González (born 1956), Nicaraguan diplomat
- Gilda Buttà (born 1959), Italian pianist
- Gilda Casanova (born 1995), Cuban sprinter
- Gilda Cobb-Hunter (born 1952), American politician
- Gilda Cordero-Fernando (1930–2020), Filipino writer and publisher
- Gilda Cruz-Romo (1940–2025), Mexican operatic soprano
- Gilda Dalla Rizza (1892–1975), Italian operatic soprano
- Gilda Darthy (1878–1952), French actress
- Gilda de Abreu (1904–1979), Brazilian actress, singer, writer and film director
- Gilda Galán (1917–2009), Puerto Rican actress, dramatist, comedian, writer, composer, scriptwriter and poet
- Gilda García López (born c. 1965), Panamanian beauty pageant contestant, 1986 Miss Panamá
- Gilda Gelati (born 1967), Italian ballerina
- Gilda Giuliani (born 1954), Italian singer
- Gilda Gray (1901–1959) Polish-born American actress and dancer, born Marianna Michalska
- Gilda Haddock (born 1956), Puerto Rican actress, gospel singer and dancer
- Gilda Holst (born 1952), Ecuadorian writer and professor
- Gilda Jacobs (born 1949), American politician
- Gilda Jannaccone (born 1940), Italian former middle distance runner
- Gilda Kirkpatrick (born 1973), Iranian-born New Zealand author, creative director and television personality
- Gilda Langer (1896–1920), German actress
- Gilda Lousek (1937–1998), Argentine actress
- Gilda H. Loew (1930–2001), American chemist
- Gilda Lyons (born 1975), American composer, vocalist, and visual artist
- Gilda Maiken (1922–2001), American pop and jazz singer
- Gilda Marchiò (1884–1954), Italian theatre actress
- Gilda Montenegro (born 1967), Costa Rican slalom canoeist
- Gilda E. Nardone (fl. 1978—present), American women's employment advocate
- Gilda Ochoa, 20th and 21st century American sociologist and professor
- Gilda Oliveira (born 1983), Brazilian freestyle wrestler
- Gilda Oliveros (born 1949), former American politician
- Gilda Olvidado (born 1957), Filipina movie and television writer
- Gilda O'Neill (1951–2010), British novelist and historian
- Gilda Radner (1946–1989), American comedian and actress
- Gilda Ruta (1856–1932), Italian pianist, music educator and composer
- Gilda Sansone (born 1989), Italian fashion model
- Gilda Snowden (1954–2014), African-American artist from Detroit
- Gilda Texter (born 1946), American costume designer, wardrobe supervisor and actress
- Gilda Varesi (1887–1965), Italian-born actress and playwright

== Fictional characters with the given name ==
- Gilda (Rigoletto), the daughter of the title character of the opera Rigoletto
- Gilda Dent, the wife of Harvey Dent (better known as the villain Two-Face) in Batman comic books
- Gilda the Griffon, a character in My Little Pony: Friendship Is Magic
- Gilda Joyce, mystery novel series written by Jennifer Allison, featuring lead character Gilda Joyce as a psychic investigator
- Las hermanas Gilda, Spanish comic characters of the series of the same name created by Manuel Vázquez Gallego in 1949

== See also ==
- Gilda (disambiguation)
- Gildo (given name)
