= Gildo (disambiguation) =

Gildo was a Roman Berber general in the province of Mauretania Caesariensis.

Gildo may also refer to:

- Gildo (given name), a given name
- Rex Gildo, German singer

== See also ==
- Gilda (disambiguation)
