= Screenvision =

American cinema advertising company

Screenvision Media
- Industry: Advertising
- Founded: 1990
- Headquarters: New York City, United States
- Key people: Geoff Schiller (CEO)
- Parent: Abry Partners (from 2018)

Screenvision Media is a cinema advertising and film distribution company in the United States.

The company's advertising network spans approximately 2,300 movie theatres, or around 14,000 theatre screens in total. Headquartered in New York City, Screenvision provides on-screen advertising, in-lobby promotions and integrated marketing programs, with offices in New York City, Chicago, Detroit, and Los Angeles. The company’s Screenvision Direct business unit has 6 regional offices and local sales representatives nationwide. Screenvision has 350 employees and an annual revenue of $250 million.

Screenvision represents over 155 theatrical exhibitors, including 17 of the top 25 exhibitor companies. In addition to cinema advertising sales and media management, the company provides production services, high definition digital network installation and management, digital entertainment preshow production, alternative content services and other associated products and services.

== Structure ==
Screenvision was a joint venture between ITV plc (LSE: ITV), a UK-based free to air commercial television broadcaster and Technicolor SA, a provider of technology, services, systems and equipment to the media and entertainment industries.

== History ==
On 28 September 2010, ITV plc sold their stake to Shamrock Capital Growth Fund II, in a deal worth a reported $80m. Later on, Carmike Cinemas acquired 20% of Screenvision; today, that 20% stake is owned by AMC Entertainment. AMC's acquisition of Carmike Cinemas resulted in the transfer of 384 AMC Theatre screens into the Screenvision Media exhibitor network.

In May 2014, Screenvision entered into a merger agreement with National CineMedia (NCM) for US$375 million. The merger was blocked by the Department of Justice over antitrust concerns, since Screenvision and NCM together would supply advertising to 34,000 of the nation's 39,000 movie screens. In March 2015, Screenvision and NCM terminated their deal and NCM paid Screenvision a $26.8 million termination payment.

In the fall of 2016, Screenvision Media rolled out Screenvision Select, an additive network with curated programming created specifically for art house theatres.

At their 2016 upfront event in New York City, Screenvision Media unveiled the Connected Cinema brand "storytelling platform", which, through several tech alliances, will allow advertisers to "engage with" moviegoers before, during and after the movie.

Screenvision was acquired by Abry Partners in June 2018 for $380 million. The Boston-based media-focused private equity firm took a controlling stake in the company.

In November 2019, the company launched Screenvision Sports, extending their core cinema advertising business to sports leagues, teams and properties.

== Film distribution ==
The company also distributed Hasbro's My Little Pony: Equestria Girls and My Little Pony: Equestria Girls – Rainbow Rocks, films that serve as a spin-off to the award winning family animation series My Little Pony: Friendship is Magic to over 300 theaters across the United States. In January 2017, Screenvision Media partnered with 4K Media to bring Yu-Gi-Oh!: The Dark Side of Dimensions to over 500 theatres across North America.
