= List of My Little Pony characters =

The My Little Pony franchise debuted in 1982, the creation of American illustrator and designer Bonnie Zacherle. Together with sculptor Charles Muenchinger and manager Steve D'Aguanno, Bonnie submitted a design patent in August 1981 for "an ornamental design for a toy animal". She was then working for Hasbro. The patent was granted in August 1983.

== Pony-related mythological characters ==
=== Fairy horses ===
==== Flutter Ponies ====
Flutter Ponies are fairy ponies with tiny bodies, curly hair, longer legs than regular ponies and fairy-like wings. They were first released in 1986. The Flutter Ponies may appear delicate, but in truth, they possess a powerful ability called the "Utter Flutter", which allows them to blow away everything in their path by flapping their wings rapidly. They are rarely seen, preferring to live in seclusion, usually in Flutter Valley. Honeysuckle, Morning Glory and Rosedust were the only notable ones in the first My Little Pony series.

Name	Gender	Body color	Hair color	Eye color	Cutie mark	Debut year	Animation debut	Voice actor	Incarnation(s)
Forget-Me-Not	Female	Purple	White	Blue (Toy version); Green (Animation)	Forget-me-not Flowers	1986	My Little Pony (TV series)	Betty Jean Ward	1
Forget-Me-Not is a clever Flutter Pony, who is usually smart. She is very knowledgeable on things, especially on the appearance of Tambelon. According to her US Backcard story, Forget-Me-Not gathered all the ponies in the meadow for a surprise birthday party. There were balloons, presents, and a birthday cake that said "Happy Birthday Megan." Then she placed a candle made of glittering stardust on the cake. When Megan arrived, a beautiful sprinkling of stardust showered the air. Everyone laughed as the stardust whirled around them. Megan's wish to share her birthday with all her friends had come true. In the UK comic, she told Baby Lucky of the Misty Mountain, which urged him to go there and led to the discovery of the Mountain Boy Ponies.
Honeysuckle	Female	Pink	'Fading' pink	Blue (Toy version); Pink (Animation)	Honeysuckle Flowers	1986	My Little Pony (TV series)	Nancy Cartwright	1
Honeysuckle is shown to be argumentative to the other Flutter Ponies but sometimes respective to Rosedust. According to her US Backcard story, the colorful leaves fell to the ground one by one. It was time for Honeysuckle to change the season from autumn to winter. She gathered snow crystals from a secret ice cave and flew into the sky, sprinkling the crystals into the clouds and ponds. Snowflakes began to dance down from the clouds as the ponds iced over. Honeysuckle watched from above as children donned their mittens and scarves, ready to build snowmen and slide down snow-covered hills. She only has one appearance in the UK comic.
Lily	Female	Pink	Purple	Green (Toy version); Purple (Animation)	Green and pink lily plant and one lily on her forehead (Toy version); Red Lilies (Animation)	1986	My Little Pony (TV series)	N/A	1
Lily appeared in the My Little Pony & Friends TV series episode, "The End of Flutter Valley". According to her US backcard story, the baby ponies were anxiously awaiting Lily's visit to the Lullabye Nursery and today was the day. Lily brought many presents, played games and sang songs with the baby ponies. At bedtime, Lily told them how Flutter Ponies spread good luck by flapping their magical wings. Then she gave each one a goodnight kiss and flew off into the sky. High above the clouds, Lily watched over her little friends, filling their heads with sweet dreams. She was already planning her next visit that was sure to be full of happy surprises. There are FiM ponies with the name of Lily but have yet to have official differences to tell them apart. Her only UK comic appearance is where she finds a bell in a snowdrop and discovers the Pearly N' Pretty Baby Sea Ponies.
Morning Glory	Female	Green (Original TV Series); Pink (Second Incarnation); Yellow (2000 Animated Specials)	Yellow (Original TV Series); Purple (Second Incarnation); Light pink, pale pink and orange (2000 Animated Specials)	Purple (Original Series toy); Blue (Original TV Series and the Second Incarnation toy line); Green (2000 Animated Specials)	Morning glory Flowers (Original TV Series); Four flowers and three leaves (Second Incarnation); Singing yellow bird on a branch over a rainbow with musical notes (2000 Animated Specials)	1986 (Original TV Series); 1997 (Second Incarnation); 2007 (2000 Animated Specials)	My Little Pony: The Movie (Debut); My Little Pony (TV series)	Russi Taylor	1, 2, 3
Morning Glory is a sweet and naive Flutter Pony, who helped Sting to fly as well to get Megan in the Human World by flying through the Rainbow. Morning Glory reappeared in the second incarnation of the My Little Pony toy line released in 1997. In this second toy line, Morning Glory is the imaginative one. She thinks up special ways to brighten the day, like picking bouquets of flowers and wrapping them in magical rainbows. She again got released in the third toy line as one of the Cutie Cascade Ponies. She appears in two comics.
Peach Blossom	Female	Aqua (Original TV Series) Yellow (2000 Animated Specials)	Turquoises (Original TV Series); Pink, yellow and peach (mane) pink (tail) (2000 Animated Specials)	Purple (Original TV Series); Blue (2000 Animated Specials)	Peach flowers (Original TV Series); Raised Flower with fabric petals (2000 Animated Specials)	1986 (Friends); 2007 (2000)	My Little Pony: The Movie (Debut); My Little Pony (TV series)	Betty Jean Ward	1, 3
Peach Blossom is smart and logical Flutter Pony who is very proper and intelligent. She speaks in a way incomprehensible to most of the others. She uses her small size to her advantage, at one point acting as a spy. Peach Blossom gains an immense vocabulary in The Return of Tambelon. She again got released in the third incarnation as a crystal design pony.
Rosedust	Female	Yellow	Light Pink	Pink	Three pink roses and seven pink and green rosebuds	1986	My Little Pony: The Movie (Debut); My Little Pony (TV series)	Russi Taylor	1
Rosedust first appeared in 1986 during the fourth year of the first toy line. Rosedust is the Queen and leader of the Flutter Ponies, who always speaks with an odd British accent. She usually wears a dark pink feather on her head. She was in charge of protecting the Sunstone, a giant magical jewel that allows Flutter Valley to flourish.

==== Breezies ====
The Breezies are small fairy ponies living in Breezy Blossom. These ponies usually have butterfly-like wings and antennae on their heads. Notable ones in the franchise were Tiddly Wink, Tra La La and Zipzee. They were first released in 2006. In Friendship is Magic, they are mentioned by Fluttershy in the episode called "Three's A Crowd" and they are featured in episode "It Ain't Easy Being Breezies" where they are shown to have their own language.

Name	Gender	Body color	Hair color	Eye color	Cutie mark	Debut year	Animation debut	Voice actor	Incarnation(s)
Breezette	Female	Light blue	Purple	Purple	N/A	2014	My Little Pony: Friendship Is Magic	Cathy Weseluck	4
Breezette is one of the Breezies who come to Equestria. She is the only one to wear a mushroom cap on her head.
Seabreeze	Male	Blue	Pink	Pink	N/A	2014	My Little Pony: Friendship Is Magic	Brian Drummond	4
Seabreeze is the leader of a small group of Breezies who stay in Ponyville. He is able to speak both Breezy and communicate with the ponies. He speaks with a Norwegian accent.
Tiddly Wink	Female	Purple	Purple with a Light Pink Streak	Purple	Purple Flower	2006	My Little Pony (2000 Specials)	Chantal Strand	3
Tiddly Wink is usually supportive towards the ponies and the other Breezies. Usually, she and her friends agree with each other to lead the way.
Tra La La	Female	Light Pink	Pink	Purple and Pink (Toy version); Blue (Animation)	Pink Flower	2006	My Little Pony (2000 Specials)	Britt McKillip	3
Tra La La is usually supportive towards the ponies and the other Breezies. Usually, she and her friends agree with each other to lead the way.
Twirly	Female	Light yellow	Dark and light turquoise	Dark teal	N/A	2014	My Little Pony: Friendship Is Magic	Ashleigh Ball	4
Twirly is one of the Breezies who come to Equestria.
Zipzee	Female	Yellow	Orange with a yellow streak	Blue	Two orange and white flowers	2006	My Little Pony (2000 Specials)	Andrea Libman	3
Zipzee is usually supportive towards the ponies and the other Breezies. Usually, she and her friends agree with each other to lead the way. Zipzee also has Allergic rhinitis; she usually sneezes a lot when she is near flowers, despite being born in Breezy Blossom.

=== Aquatic horses ===
Seaponies and Baby Seaponies

The Seaponies are brightly colored seahorse-like creatures who dwell in the rivers and lakes of Dream Valley. They love underwater polo and can perform elaborate songs and dance numbers. They were first released in 1983 and only appeared in the two original specials. The Seaponies are based on the Hippocamp, a mythological creature shared by Phoenician and Greek mythology. A sub-line of the Seaponies called Baby Seaponies debuted in 1985 and later in My Little Pony: The Movie. Some additional Seaponies are shaped like merfolk.

Hippogriffs and Hippocamps

Hippogriffs and Hippocamps are introduced in the 2017 My Little Pony: The Movie and Season 7 onwards of My Little Pony: Friendship Is Magic. They are a "hybrid sub-species" of ponies able to shapechange between forms to better adapt to an aquatic or mountainous environment.

Name	Gender	Body shape	Body color	Hair color	Eye color	Fin color	Cutie mark	Debut year	Animation debut	Voice actor	Incarnation(s)
Backstroke/Baby Backstroke	Female	Seahorse	Pink	Orange	Aqua	Orange	N/A	1984	Escape from Katrina	Paco Shakespeare	1
According to Backstroke's Backcard story, Splasher was playing with her turtle float on the shore when she heard splashing coming from the cove by the rocks. Quietly, she hid behind a rock to watch. Another baby sea pony was in the shallow water, bobbing its fins and flippers up and down. She was so graceful, gliding about in the water, just like they learned in swimming class. "What a wonderful swimmer!" Splasher said out loud. The baby sea pony looked up in response to Splasher's voice. "Can you teach me to swim like that?" Splasher asked, joining her in the water. The two baby sea ponies swam and played together until it was time to go home. "You swim so well that I'm going to call you Backstroke," Splasher laughed. From then on, Backstroke the baby sea pony, was known as the best swimmer in the sea and taught all the other sea ponies how to do the backstroke. Baby Backstroke is the only Baby Seapony that appears in Escape from Katrina. She is seen playing with Baby Moondancer.
Beachcomber	Female	Seahorse (originally)	Blue (As a Seapony); Pink (As an Earth Pony)	Blue (As a Seapony); Dark Pink (As an Earth Pony)	Purple (As a Seapony); Blue (As an Earth Pony)	Blue (As a Seapony)	Pink Hibiscus flower (2000 Animated Specials)	1985 (Seapony Debut); 2005 (Earth Pony Debut)	My Little Pony (TV series)	N/A	1, 3
Beachcomber is a playful baby seapony who appeared in the original series. She only has a brief appearance in some episodes without any speaking roles. Beachcomber is then re-released in the third incarnation toy line, this time as an Earth Pony. She likes to spend the time in the beach and hopes on finding a buried treasure.
Ocean Flow	Female	Hippogriff/Hippocamp	Pale yellow	Lavender	Lavender	Purple	None	2018	Surf and/or Turf	Advah Soudack	4
Ocean Flow is the mother of Silverstream and Terramar. She is first visited by pony princess Twilight Sparkle who brings the Cutie Mark Crusaders to Seaquestria in the deep.
Princess Skystar	Female	Hippogriff/Hippocamp	Pale yellow	Pale blue	Pale blue	Pink	None	2017	My Little Pony: The Movie	Kristin Chenoweth	4
Princess Skystar lives in the castle of Seaquestria.
Queen Novo	Female	Hippogriff/Hippocamp					None	2017	My Little Pony: The Movie	Uzo Aduba	4
This seapony is the queen of Seaquestria.
Ripple	Female	Seahorse	White	Pink	Turquoise	Pink	N/A	1985	My Little Pony (TV series)	Nancy Cartwright	1
Ripple is a playful baby seapony who appeared in the original series. She's the fastest swimmer of all the baby Seaponies.
Sand Dollar	Female	Seahorse (originally)	Pink	Yellow (Toy version); Chartreuse Green (Animation); Purple (Earth Pony)	Teal (Original); Purple (Earth Pony)	Aqua	Raised yellow sand dollar surrounded by purple dots (Earth Pony)	1984 (Original); 2005 (Earth Pony)	Escape From Katrina	Tasha Sallia	1, 3
Sand Dollar is one of the Seaponies that appears in Escape from Katrina. She, Whitecap, and Sea Mist were playing volleyball with Lickety-Split, Posey, and Sundance. As a toy she is also accompanied by, High Tide, Sea Breeze, and Wave Jumper.
Sealight	Female	Seahorse	Lavender	Pink	Blue	Pink	N/A	1983	Rescue at Midnight Castle	Nancy Cartwright	1
Sealight is a playful Seapony, who alongside the other Seaponies, saved Megan and Applejack from drowning. They gave Megan a shell that allows them to summon the Seaponies.
Sea Mist	Female	Seahorse	White	Red with light pink stripe	Maroon	Pink	N/A	1984	Escape From Katrina	Claire Cleena	1
Sea Mist is one of the Seaponies that appears in Escape from Katrina. She, Whitecap, and Sand Dollar were playing volleyball with Lickety-Split, Posey, and Sundance.
Sea Shimmer	Female	Seahorse	Pale green-yellow	Blue	Blue (Toy version); Green (Animation)	Blue	N/A	1985	My Little Pony (TV series)	Katie Leigh	1
Sea Shimmer is a playful baby Seapony who appeared in the original series. Sea Shimmer is an expert water hockey player and loves to play with her friends.
Seawinkle	Female	Seahorse	Blue	Purple	Teal	Purple	N/A	1983	Rescue at Midnight Castle	Ivy Austin	1
Seawinkle is a playful Seapony, who alongside the other Seaponies, saved Megan and Applejack from drowning. They gave Megan a shell that allows them to summon the Seaponies. Seawinkle also has a yellow hairbow on her head.
Silverstream	Female	Hippogriff/Hippocamp	Lavender	Light blue	Purple	Fuchsia	N/A	2018	Friendship Is Magic	Lauren Jackson	4
Silverstream is one of Equestria's hybrids. She loves playing with friends of different creature species.
Surf Rider	Female	Seahorse	Lavender	Pale Pink	Blue	Pale Pink	N/A	1985	My Little Pony (TV series)	Russi Taylor	1
Surf Rider is a playful baby Seapony who appeared in the original series. Surf Rider's song can invoke sleep to anyone who hears her song.
Sun Shower	Female	Seahorse	Yellow	Gold	Blue	Orange	N/A	1985	My Little Pony (TV series)	Katie Leigh	1
Sun Shower is a playful baby Seapony who appeared in the original series. Sun Shower cares about her appearance highly and is vain sometimes.
Water Lily	Female	Seahorse	Pink	Turquoise	Purple	Turquoise	N/A	1985	My Little Pony (TV series)	Sherry Lynn	1
Water Lily is a playful baby Seapony who appeared in the original series. Water Lily has the best voice of all the baby Seaponies.
Wavedancer	Female	Seahorse	Pink	Blue	Purple	Blue	N/A	1983	Rescue at Midnight Castle	Jeannie Elias	1
Wavedancer is a playful Seapony, who alongside the other Seaponies, saved Megan and Applejack from drowning. They gave Megan a shell that allow them to summon the Seaponies.
Whitecap	Female	Seahorse	White	Purple with Blue streak	Blue	Pink	N/A	1984	Escape From Katrina	Moornyung	1
Whitecap is one of the Seaponies that appears in Escape from Katrina. She, Sea Mist, and Sand Dollar were playing volleyball with Lickety-Split, Posey, and Sundance.

=== Crystal Ponies ===
Crystal Ponies are inhabitants of the Crystal Empire in My Little Pony: Friendship Is Magic. They appear as Earth Ponies with a few distinctive features. Their form changes depending on their mood. When they are sad and depressed, their manes and tails are flat and unstyled, their ears are always folded down, and their coats have a greyish hue. When they're happy (without the Crystal Heart), their manes and tails revert to different styles, their ears are up as normal, and their coats have a brighter hue. Additionally, mares get their decorations on their heads/hair. When in a more jubilant mood (with the Crystal Heart fully powered), all the Crystal Ponies retain their "happy mood" form and their bodies magically transform into a translucent crystallized form. The Crystal Heart also crystallizes the Mane Six, Spike, Shining Armor, Princess Luna, Princess Celestia, and Princess Cadance as well, albeit briefly (possibly reverting to their original forms as they exit the Crystal Empire).

Name	Gender	Coat color	Mane color	Eye color	Cutie mark	Episode debut	Voice actor
Agatha/Amethyst Maresbury	Female	Purple-grey	Crystal-Pink	Dark Purple	Scroll	The Crystal Empire	Cathy Weseluck
The librarian of the Crystal Empire. Initially as seen, she wears glasses, but as she turns jolly, she puts on her crystal hat adorned with gems on it.
Amberlocks	Female	Orange	Red	Purple	A grain of wheat	The Crystal Empire; Magical Mystery Cure	N/A
Amber Waves	Female	Indigo	Yellow	Light Purple	A grain of wheat	The Crystal Empire; Games Ponies Play; Magical Mystery Cure	Tabitha St. Germain
Arctic Lily	Female	Blue	Purple	Aqua	Fleur-de-lis	The Crystal Empire	None
Ardent	Male	Green	Blue	Blue	A crenelated Tower	The Crystal Empire; Magical Mystery Cure	N/A
Autumn Gem	Female	Blue	Purple	Blue	A grain of wheat	The Crystal Empire; Just for Sidekicks; Games Ponies Play; Magical Mystery Cure	Nicole Oliver
Berry Splash	Female	Blue	Pink	Blue	Unknown	Games Ponies Play	N/A
Castle	Male	Ice Blue	Yellow	Yellow	Crenelated Tower	The Crystal Empire; Magical Mystery Cure	Andrew Francis
Check Mate	Male	Indigo	Yellow	Yellow	A crenelated tower	The Crystal Empire	None
Crystal Arrow	Male	Clear white	Aqua	Fuchsia	An archer's bow and arrow	The Crystal Empire; Magical Mystery Cure	Andrew Francis
Dandy Brush	Female	Purple	Lavender	Grey	Brush	Games Ponies Play	N/A
Esmeralda	Female	Green	Dark green	Light green	Fleur-de-lis	The Crystal Empire	N/A
Fleur de Verre	Female	White	Pink	Pinkish-Grey	Magenta Fleur-de-lis	The Crystal Empire; Magical Mystery Cure	Tabitha St. Germain
One of the citizens of the Crystal Empire. She first made her debut in season 3 and she appears again in seasons 4 and 5.
Golden Glitter	Female	Gold	Gold	Gold	Crown	Games Ponies Play	N/A
Goldilocks	Female	White	Gold	Purple	A grain of wheat	Games Ponies Play	N/A
Honey Tone	Female	Pink	Yellow	Greyish-blue	Two flowers and a bow	Games Ponies Play	N/A
Honeycomb	Female	Crystal white	Pink and green	Blue	A pair of combs	Games Ponies Play	Tabitha St. Germain
Ivory	Male	Yellow	Blue	Light blue	A crenelated tower	The Crystal Empire; Games Ponies Play; Magical Mystery Cure	N/A
Jade	Female	Dark green	Pink	Purple	Fleur-de-lis	The Crystal Empire	None
Long Jump	Male	White	Blue	Purple	Unknown	Games Ponies Play	N/A
One of the athlete Crystal Ponies.
Night Knight	Male	Blue	Ice blue	Yellow	An archer's bow and arrow	The Crystal Empire; Just for Sidekicks	Andrew Francis
A blue Crystal Pony. He has a brief speaking role.
Paradise	Female	Pink	Purple	Lavender	Fleur-de-lis (some shots), a palm tree on an island (one shot)	The Crystal Empire; Games Ponies Play; Magical Mystery Cure	Cathy Weseluck
Paradise appears to have multiple cutie marks. She has a brief speaking role.
Purple Polish	Female	Purple	Purple	Unknown, but it seems to be purple	Unknown	Games Ponies Play	N/A
One of the cleaning Crystal Ponies. She shares her design with Amberlocks, Amber Waves,
Quicksilver	Female	Yellow	Blue	Purple	Unknown	Games Ponies Play	Cathy Weseluck
A messenger Crystal Pony. She has a brief speaking role.
Rapid Rush	Female	Purple	Blue	Pink	Unknown	Games Ponies Play	N/A
One of the athlete Crystal Ponies.
Rose Quartz	Female	Pink	White	White	Unknown	Games Ponies Play	N/A
One of the spa Crystal Ponies.
Rubinstein	Male	Indigo	Blue	Indigo	A crenelated tower	The Crystal Empire; Magical Mystery Cure	N/A
He is one of the crystal stallions appearing in The Crystal Empire, along with Ardent, Castle, Check Mate, Crystal Arrow, Ivory, Night Knight, and Zirconic.
Sapphire Rose	Female	Pink	Blue	Green	Unknown-possibly a grain of wheat	The Crystal Empire	None
One of the Crystal Ponies only to appear in The Crystal Empire. She shares her design with Amberlocks, Amber Waves, Autumn Gem, Dandy Brush, Goldilocks, and Purple Polish.
Sugar Glass	Male	Yellow	Orange	Purple	Unknown	Games Ponies Play	N/A
A food stand Crystal Pony.
Sunshine Splash	Female	Yellow	Blue and yellow	Blue	Unknown	Games Ponies Play	N/A
One of the athlete Crystal Ponies.
Toastie	Female	Pale white	Green and yellow	Electric lime	Unknown	Games Ponies Play	N/A
One of the athlete Crystal Ponies.
Winnow Wind	Female	Yellow	Purple	Unknown, but seems to be blue	A grain of wheat	The Crystal Empire	None
One of the Crystal Ponies only to appear in The Crystal Empire.
Zirconic	Male	Blue	Purple	Blue	Unknown	The Crystal Empire	None
One of the Crystal Ponies only to appear in The Crystal Empire.

=== Kirins ===
Kirins are a race of unicorn-like creatures with lion-like traits. They are known for being kind and truthful, and their culture emphasizes theatrical and musical entertainment. When angered, they take on a beast-like form referred to as "Nirik" ("kirin" spelled backwards). They were formally introduced in the season eight episode "Sounds of Silence", where the Kirin character Autumn Blaze revealed that after their anger and bickering destroyed their own village, the elder Rain Shine forced them to bathe in an enchanted river that suppressed their ability to express emotions or speak (however, "foal's-breath" flowers are able to reverse the effects).

=== Other related pony types ===
Pony Friends

The Pony Friends is a sub-line of My Little Pony, first released in 1986. They are composed of animals bearing the same brushable hair and cutie marks as the ponies, such as a giraffe named Creamsicle, a lion named Kingsley, a zebra named Zig Zag, a camel named Spunky, a panda named Nectar, a sheep named Woolly, a cow calf named Leafy, a kangaroo named Hoppy, an elephant named Edgar, a moose named Oakly, a dinosaur named Cutesaurus, and a llama named Cha Cha. Each of the Pony Friends never made an appearance in the animated series, until My Little Pony: Friendship Is Magic. The first one in the show was a zebra.

Fairy Tails

The Fairy Tails is a short-lived sub-line, consisting of My Little Pony-esque birds, which are the titular Fairy Tails. The line was in stores from 1986 to 1987, corresponding with Year Five of original toy line. This year saw the release of the Pony Friends in the My Little Pony line, making it a distinct possibility that they and Fairy Tails were part of the same investigation into an expansion of My Little Pony that offered more than only ponies.

Dream Beauties

Dream Beauties is another sub-line of My Little Pony, released in 1988. These were Hasbro's attempt at a more realistic version of My Little Pony.

Takara variants

In 1984, Takara (Later merged with Tomy to form Takara Tomy) released a line of My Little Pony toys, which were released in two types: Osharena Pony (おしゃれなポニー, Osharena ponī) and Kawaii Pony (かわいいポニー, Kawaī ponī). Only released in Japan, Bushiroad would eventually acquire the property from Takara Tomy 27 years later.

== Non-Pony characters ==
=== Dragons ===
As of Friendship Is Magic, there are three, then four and now five dragon characters who appeared in the whole franchise. Spike, however, is the most notable.

Name	Gender	Body color	Spike color	Eye color	Hair color	Debut year	Animation debut	Voice actor	Incarnation(s)
Crackle	Female	Green	Lime green	Red	None	2012	Friendship Is Magic	Unknown	4
One of the dragons featured in Dragon Quest.
Garble	Male	Red	Gold	Yellow	Orange	2012	Friendship Is Magic	Vincent Tong	4
Garble is a red, winged male dragon and is the apparent leader of the gang that Spike encounters. He only appeared in the episode, Dragon Quest.
Princess Ember	Female	Cerulean	Indigo	Red and orange	Indigo	2016	Gauntlet of Fire	Ali Milner	4
Princess Ember is the daughter of Torch the Dragon Lord. She has Smolder as her enroller for the School of Friendship which Twilight Sparkle establishes.
Smolder	Female	Orange	Magenta	Turquoise	None	2018	School Daze - Part 1	Shannon Chan-Kent	4
Smolder is one of the members of the Young 6. She's also one of the students in Equestria's School of Friendship.
Spike	Male	Pink (Original TV Series); Blue (2000 Animated Specials) light purple (Friendship is Magic and Make Your Mark)	Green (Original TV Series); Yellow (2000 Animated Specials); Lime Green (Friendship is Magic and Make Your Mark)	Green (Original TV Series, FiM and MYM); Blue (2000 Animated Specials)	None (Original TV Series, FiM and MYM); Pink (2000 Animated Specials)	1984 (Original TV Series); 2006 (2000 Animated Specials); 2010 (Friendship is Magic); 2023 (Make Your Mark)	Rescue at Midnight Castle (My Little Pony and Friends); The Princess Promenade (2000 Animated Specials); Friendship Is Magic (FiM); My Little Pony: Pony Life (PL); Make Your Mark (MYM)	Charlie Adler (Rescue at Midnight Castle to Original TV Series); Brian Drummond (2000 Animated Specials); Cathy Weseluck (FiM); Tabitha St. Germain (PL); Martin Roach (MYM)	1, 3, 4, 5
Spike is a male baby dragon with a light purple body, green eyes and a green spikes; who is adopted by Megan and the ponies after they defeated Tirek. He's the only character to appear throughout the original TV Series, from the original pilot episode to The Prince and the Ponies. In the UK comic book series, he has two teeth and is the pet dragon of Majesty. In the 2000 Animated Specials, he is shown to be knowledgeable on things and gives the ponies some advice. In Friendship Is Magic, he's been redesigned again, now closely resembling his original counterpart except in this version, he has purple skin and lime green scales. Spike also handles communications between Twilight and Princess Celestia, burning Twilight's written messages with his fire breath to send them and then burping up the scrolls Celestia sends back. He frequently displays a sarcastic streak, but can be counted on to help Twilight and her friends when they need him. He also eats gemstones and it is shown that he has a crush on Rarity. In the season 2 episode "Secret of My Excess", he admits his crush to her which she accepts. Always helpful, he's genuinely concerned about his friends' well-being. He is regarded as a national hero for saving the Crystal Empire. He was initially wingless until the season 8 episode "Molt Down" when he gets a sudden development of molting resulting him to get wings like all the dragons in Equestria. In the fifth generation, Spike became the dragon lord.
Whimsey Weatherbe	Female	Orange	Yellow	Black	Brown	2009	Twinkle Wish Adventure	Keegan Connor Tracy	3
Whimsey Weatherbe is a female winged dragon, described to live in Willy Nilly Mountain at the outskirts of Ponyville. She speaks with a New Jersey accent and likes to have friends. Whimsey's abilities are shown to manipulate the weather using her dragon breath, which explains the changing weather on the mountain. She "kidnaps" Twinkle Wish, the wishing star in Ponyville after Scootaloo accidentally opens its box, leading to the ponies going to the mountain to retrieve it from her. After the ponies failed to convince her, she decides to give it back with a changed heart at the night of the Winter Wishes Festival. She is one of the 2000 Animated Specials characters without a toy appearance alongside Storybelle.

=== Humans ===
==== Williams family ====
Since the first toy line of My Little Pony, human characters were present in the franchise. The Williams siblings were the first set of human characters created for the entire series, and appeared in the original TV series.

Name	Gender	Age	Hair color	Eye color	Debut year	Animation debut	Voice actor
Danny Williams	Male	10	Reddish Brown	Blue	1986	My Little Pony: The Movie	Scott Menville
Danny Williams is Megan and Molly's brother and a rambunctious redhead. He is sometimes found leading the charge when a situation calls for reckless action.
Megan Williams	Female	12 (Rescue at Midnight Castle, Escape from Katrina, The Movie), 13 (the series)	Blonde	Blue	1984 (Alongside Sundance)	Rescue at Midnight Castle	Tammy Amerson (movie); Bettina Bush (series 1); Ginny McSwain (series 2)
Megan Williams is an adolescent American girl, and the eldest of three children. She is Danny and Molly's older sister. She became the main character of the first My Little Pony series. She and her siblings live on a ranch where she keeps a horse, TJ, and a bull, Tauro. Gentle and motherly, but also mature and resourceful, she acts as the Little Ponies' leader, and in times of crisis the ponies often fly across the rainbow to find her. She keeps the Rainbow of Light, a special locket which contains a powerful rainbow to defeat anything that is evil threatening the ponies.
Molly Williams	Female	7	Blonde	Blue	1986	My Little Pony: The Movie	Keri Houlihan
Molly Williams is Megan and Danny's youngest sister. She's often scared around monsters, but never too scared to fight with Danny. Her hair is in pigtails.

==== Equestria Girls ====
The Equestria Girls are the second set of human characters that were created for the franchise, which are featured in Friendship is Magic. They appear in the film series of the same name as their respective ponies' human counterparts.

===== The Dazzlings =====
During Rainbow Rocks, Twilight Sparkle learned through research that the Dazzlings were sirens from Equestria who used their music to cause disharmony. They were banished to the human world by Star Swirl the Bearded. In the final battle against the Rainbooms, the band was defeated, causing the ruby gem pendants with which they controlled the students to shatter and explode. As a result, their inability to sing led to them being chased off in disgrace. The Dazzlings also return reformed performing a new song called "Find the Magic".

Name	Gender	Skin color	Hair color	Eye color	Cutie mark	Debut year	Animation debut	Voice actor
Adagio Dazzle	Female	Beige	Orange with gold highlights	Raspberry (human and pony forms); Yellow (siren form)	Jeweled Topaz	2014	Rainbow Rocks	Kazumi Evans
Adagio Dazzle is the main antagonist of Rainbow Rocks. She is the lead singer of "The Dazzlings" and her hair is all curly, tied in a big ponytail decorated with spikes.
Aria Blaze	Female	Light Purple	Purple with teal green highlights	Purple	Purple 5-point star with black curve	2014	Rainbow Rocks	Diana Kaarina (speaking); Shylo Sharity (singing)
Aria Blaze is the secondary antagonist of Rainbow Rocks. Her hair is tied in a twintail hairstyle decorated with stars and she is one of the two backup singers of "The Dazzlings".
Sonata Dusk	Female	Light Blue	Cyan/Dark Blue	Moderate Raspberry (human and pony forms); Cyan (siren form)	Fuchsia heart with cyan jagged 8th note in front	2014	Rainbow Rocks	Maryke Hendrikse (speaking); Madeline Merlo (singing)
Sonata Dusk is the secondary antagonist of Rainbow Rocks. Her hair is tied in a ponytail and she is one of the two backup singers of "The Dazzlings".

=== Pets ===
Name	Species	Gender	Body color	Hair color	Eye color	Cutie mark	Debut year	Animation debut	Voice actor
Angel	Rabbit	Male	White	None	Black	None	2010	Friendship Is Magic	
Angel is Fluttershy's pet white rabbit. Angel can be seen as a cunning and mischievous bunny despite his cute and seemingly innocent name. He has a strong influence over Fluttershy's decisions in the series, as he is far more assertive than the timid Pegasus. However, he does seem to genuinely care for Fluttershy, as several of his actions toward her are usually just a little push to get her to do something he knows she wants.
Gummy	Alligator	Male	Green	None	Pale Violet	None	2011	Friendship Is Magic	None
Gummy is Pinkie Pie's pet alligator. Gummy appears to be usually calm, showing little interest to whatever happens around him. However, he also has a tendency to try biting various things and to hide in the water. When he's first introduced in Feeling Pinkie Keen, he shows rather aggressive behavior for a pet, because after Pinkie sets him on the floor, he proceeds to try to bite the pink Earth Pony repeatedly; as he has no teeth, this does no damage and Pinkie doesn't even seem to notice. The episode Party of One shows that his behavior is usually more peaceful, although he still tends to bite whatever happens to be near him. Most of the time, Gummy is docile to the point of absurdity, and in direct contrast with Pinkie Pie's crazed antics; he shows little to no awareness of his surroundings, often just sitting and staring into space with the same unchanging expression on his face at all times. No matter what is happening, Gummy usually just sits in place and stares at nothing, although he will occasionally attempt to bite nearby objects or even ponies. He's also able to "dance" to the music with his tail to be the only part of his body actually moving. He also seems to favor a ball of wool as his favorite toy, happily pushing it along with his nose or riding it as it rolls along. Pinkie seems convinced that Gummy is much more complex and lively than he appears to be. At the end of Party of One, for example, she said that Gummy was "pretty upset" about his party being unattended, despite the fact that Gummy had shown no change in his behavior or mood whatsoever.
Opalescence	Persian cat	Female	White	None	Light Lime	None	2011	Friendship Is Magic	
Opalescence is Rarity's pet Persian cat. Opalescence is a white cat with a purple bow on top of her head. She wears a purple collar studded with opals. Although Rarity has expressed that Opal often swipes at her when she attempts to groom her, Rarity seems to have a deep caring for her cat – instantly forgetting her woes when she saw Opal apparently stuck in a tree. Opal also seems to have a sarcastic sense of humor, chopping off some of Sweetie Belle's hair and offering a smug look afterwards when Sweetie Belle suggested she might be good with animals. She shares her owner's tastes in fashion and begrudgingly assists her with her work. Most of the time, however, she prefers to sleep on the various fabrics about the studio.
Owlowiscious	Horned owl	Male	Brown	None	Dark Grayish Amber	None	2011	Friendship Is Magic	
Owlowiscious is Twilight Sparkle's pet horned owl. Although incapable of speech, Owlowiscious is highly intelligent. Also shows to be brave and willing to help the others. Not much is known of his personality at the time, as he seems to be collected and inexpressive.
Peewee	Phoenix	Male	Red and Yellow	None	Brilliant Amber	None	2012	Friendship Is Magic	
Peewee is a baby Phoenix Spike takes in at the end of Dragon Quest after he hatches.
Philomena	Phoenix	Female	Red and Yellow (Revived); Pale Pink (Sickened State)	None	Brilliant Amber (Revived); Light Blue (Sickened State)	None	2011	Friendship Is Magic	Tabitha St. Germain (animal noises)
Philomena is Princess Celestia's pet phoenix. Fluttershy takes from Princess Celestia without permission to heal the bird when the Pegasus believed that she was sick. Later on in the episode Philomena is seen messing around with Fluttershy by refusing the medicine she gives to her just for the fun of it. According to Princess Celestia, Philomena, like all phoenixes, molts all her feathers and burns into ashes at the end of her life cycle, only to rise from the ashes and renew herself as good as new. Philomena means "Strong Friend" in Greek.
Tank	Tortoise	Male	Green	None	Black	None	2011	Friendship Is Magic	None
Tank is Rainbow Dash's pet tortoise, first seen persistently wanting Rainbow Dash to choose him as her new pet, but Rainbow Dash refuses, seeing him as a useless, slow pet that will keep her grounded. When Rainbow Dash's wing is caught under a rock, Tank comes to her rescue and shows loyalty by lifting the rock and rescuing her in the process. She chooses him as her new pet when the other animals leave her behind, caught up in the frenzy of winning the race. Afterward, he is given a magic propeller that enables him to fly.
Winona	Border Collie	Female	Brown and White	None	Black	None	2010	Friendship Is Magic	
Winona is Applejack's pet Border Collie. She is first seen in "Applebuck Season" with Applejack, where they round up a stampeding herd of cattle (and later do the same with a large number of baby rabbits). In "Too Many Pinkie Pies", she is seen herding in a huge mass of Pinkie Pies that the real Pinkie made. She is very affectionate and Applejack is shown rubbing her stomach.

=== Allies ===
Name	Species	Gender	Body color	Hair color	Eye color	Cutie mark	Debut year	Animation debut	Voice actor
Capper	Cat	Male	Orange				2017	My Little Pony: The Movie	Taye Diggs
Captain Celaeno	Parrot	Female					2017	My Little Pony: The Movie	Zoe Saldaña
Captain Crabnasty	Crabnasty	Male	Red	None	Black	None	1986	My Little Pony (TV series)	Peter Cullen
Captain Crabnasty is a male Crabnasty, giant crabs with powerful pincers. Despite his appearance, he is a creature with a sense of justice and is friendly with the ponies. He alongside his two subordinates were finding some escape criminals known as "the Flores", even if they tear down the trees in Dream Valley. However, due to the Flores's lies, Megan and ponies defeated them and shuts the Crabnasties in a stone prison away from Paradise Estates. After they realized that the Crabnasties were telling the truth, they then helped them capture the Flores. Posey apologies for their wrongful arrest and the Crabnasties respond by plowing her garden, making it ready for replanting.
Chief Thunderhooves	Buffalo	Male	Grayish Brown	None	Black	None	2011	Friendship Is Magic	Scott McNeil
Chief Thunderhooves is the leader of the buffalo herd. Chief Thunderhooves seems to be rather long-winded, judging by how many fathers he listed, and is very traditional. He is also very determined and strong, with a fierce sense of honor. He has a powerful temper and is seen losing control of himself several times. Still he warned the Appleloosans of his intentions before leading his tribe to fight them and was at least willing to negotiate. He only appeared in Over a Barrel.
Cranky Doodle Donkey	Donkey	Male	Brown	Black wig	Light Blue	None	2012	Friendship Is Magic	Richard Newman
Cranky Doodle Donkey is a donkey who first appeared in the episode "A Friend in Deed". Cranky is initially easily angered and upset, and maintains this frown even after Pinkie Pie tries to cheer him up, and tries to become his friend, through various methods such as a party cart and greeting song, and obtaining a new wig for him. It is revealed, in the time that Pinkie Pie spends trying to cheer him up, that he has arrived in Ponyville to settle down and live in. Once he and Pinkie Pie arrive at his new, secluded residence, he reveals that he has travelled far and wide across Equestria, to places such as Fillydelphia and Manehattan, to search for a special friend of his. Cranky shows his anger when he becomes very mad at Pinkie Pie once she accidentally destroys a photo album endeared to him, containing the only memories of his special friend. He does his best to keep Pinkie Pie at bay, going as far as to chain and board up his door. Once Pinkie Pie shows up at his door with Cranky's special friend, who turns out to be Matilda from earlier on in the episode, whom Cranky immediately notices the voice of, he becomes extremely joyful and shows genuine thanks to Pinkie Pie and offers her his friendship. Once he gets a kiss from Matilda, he finally feels it in him to smile, revealing his friendly inside character. He made a cameo in Dragon Quest.
Drog	Troggle	Male	Brown	Brown	Black	None	1986	My Little Pony (TV series)	N/A
Drog is a male Troggle and a servant of Grogar, the ruler of the fabled city of Tambelon. He is usually loyal to him and ordered his people to capture everyone in Ponyland after the Unicorns vanished. However, he and his people were forced to obey his orders as Drog himself wanted freedom and so does his people. After the destruction of Tambelon due to Megan and the Ponies's help, he and his people decide to live a new life in Ponyland.
Drudge	Rat	Female	Yellow-Brown	Brown	Blue	None	1986	My Little Pony (TV series)	Claire Cleena
Drudge is the slave of the Gizmonks. They send her to Dream Valley with a message concerning Danny and Surprise. Drudge tells Megan that the Gizmonks will hold them as prisoners until she turns over the Rainbow of Light to them. But Megan doesn't give in and sends he back, with Wind Whistler following. But Danny and Surprise are already planning their escape. They begin complimenting the Gizmonks on their great inventions, and when Glouda tells Drudge to let them out to look around, Danny and Surprise touch everything. As the place starts to self-destruct, Drudge decides to escape with them. By the time Megan, Wind Whistler, and North Star arrive, the Gizmonks have already surrendered, begging Megan to take Danny and Surprise home. Drudge thanks Danny and Surprise and says she will call them if the Gizmonks come back.
Gabby	Griffon	Female	Grayish Aquamarine	Light grayish feathery aquamarine arrow-shape-spotted ponytail	Teal	none	2016	Friendship Is Magic	Erin Mathews
Gabby is a griffon who has a short low ponytail. She first appears on top of the treehouse as an inhabitant of Griffonstone and she is fascinated by the Cutie Mark Crusaders.
Gallus	Griffin	Male	Blue						
Grundle King	Grundle	Male	Gray	Unknown	Black	None	1986	My Little Pony: The Movie; My Little Pony (TV series)	Danny DeVito
The Grundle King is the leader of the Grundles. He seems ugly but sweet, sometimes speaks in rhymes, and is not very smart, but has a kind heart. He and the rest of the grundles used to live in Grundleland before Hydia smoozed it and now reside in the remains of Dream Castle. Unlike most Grundles, he goes barefoot.
Grundles	Grundle	3 Males and 1 Female	Gray	Unknown	None	None	1986	My Little Pony: The Movie; My Little Pony (TV series)	Various
The Grundles are a small race of goblin like creatures. They used to live in Grundleland before Hydia smoozed it and now reside in the remains of Dream Castle. They may look like monsters, but they are the friendly type.
G'nash	Ice Orc	Male	White	Unknown	White	None	1987	My Little Pony (TV series)	Paco Shakespeare
G'nash is an Ice Orc who along with Lava Demons, had a feud against their kind. G'nash first met Spike and the Bushwoolies after they escaped Lavan, though seeing him as a dragon, they believed that he's a Lava Demon until he found out he's isn't. He is very supportive to Spike, and knows a lot of secret tunnels inside Lavan's cave. After Lavan has been destroyed, he and the Lava Demons settled a truce with their kinds.
Gustave Le Grand	Griffon	Male	Light and Dark Gray	Light Gray	Brilliant Gold	None	2012	Friendship Is Magic	Mark Oliver
Gustave only appeared in the episode called "MMMystery on the Friendship Express" with his Exquisite Éclairs. He is shown to wear a toque on his head and a red bandana around his neck. He also has a French accent.
Habbit	Rabbit	Male	Light Brown	None	Black	None	1984	Rescue at Midnight Castle; My Little Pony: The Movie	N/A
Habbit is the bunny friend of The Moochick. He first appeared in Rescue at Midnight Castle when he reminded the Moochick where he placed the Rainbow of Light. He appears again reminding the Moochick to tell them to seek out the Flutter Ponies, the only ones who can stop the Smooze.
Kyrie	Songbird	Female	Yellow	Unknown	Blue	None	1987	My Little Pony (TV series)	B. J. Ward
Kyrie is a female songbird, who's held captive by the Evil Witch Somnambula. Kyrie's sweet song has a powerful magical property, that can lure anyone hearing it into an endless illusion while Somnambula drains away their youth. She usually doesn't want to sing for Somnambula's evil plans, but she is sometimes forced into it.
Little Strongheart	Buffalo	Female	Amber	Orange	Black	None	2011	Friendship Is Magic	Erin Mathews
Little Strongheart is Chief Thunderhoove's right hand. She has a brash personality and is shown to have a good athletic ability, even dodging Rainbow Dash during the train heist. Just before the battle, she almost got him to order his tribe to stand down, and might have succeeded if not for Pinkie Pie. She only appeared in Over a Barrel.
Matilda	Donkey	Female	Brown	Dark Brown	Light Cerulean	None	2012	Friendship Is Magic	Brenda Crichlow
Matilda is a brown donkey with a curly brown mane who only appears in the episode A Friend in Deed. Matilda is first seen walking through Ponyville. Pinkie Pie wishes her a "happy birthday", 132 days in advance. Matilda is pleasantly surprised that Pinkie would know the birthdays of herself and everyone in Ponyville so well. Pinkie just smiles and walks on. Pinkie later brings Matilda to Cranky Doodle Donkey's home, having deduced that she was the "special friend" Cranky had earlier spoken of. Through flashbacks, Matilda and Cranky had met and fallen in love at the Grand Galloping Gala, many years ago. The morning after the Gala, Matilda left to move to Ponyville, leaving a note explaining this for Cranky. Unfortunately, Cranky never found the note, though Matilda says she always hoped he'd one day find her. In the present, Matilda kisses Cranky (Whom she affectionately calls "Doodle", which prompts Cranky to tell Pinkie Matilda's the only one allowed to) as they have a touching reunion, and thank Pinkie for bringing them back together. They then enter Cranky's house, almost kissing again until Pinkie interrupts with a song, causing them to reprimand her.
Mulia Mild	Donkey	Female	Grayish Amber	Dark Gray	Arctic Blue	None	2012	Friendship Is Magic	Jan Rabson
Mulia Mild is a mule and a baker who only appears in MMMystery on the Friendship Express. Her name and appearance are references to real-life chef Julia Child. Mulia is first seen aboard the train to Canterlot. She boasts about her "mousse moose", claiming it will win first prize at the National Dessert Contest. The next morning, Mulia comes under suspicion when the Cakes' cake is damaged. Pinkie Pie accuses Mulia of sabotage, creating a vivid fantasy of Mulia (clad as a ninja) knocking Pinkie out and slicing up the cake, which reduces Mulia to a quivering wreck. After Pinkie's theories are disproved, the rest of the bakers' confectioneries are mysteriously eaten. Pinkie eventually discovers that the bakers had eaten each other's work, pointing out donut sprinkles in Mulia's wrinkles. Mulia apologizes to Donut Joe, the donut dish's baker, saying that Pinkie had made them sound so good earlier. At Pinkie's suggestion, Mulia and her fellow bakers combine what remains of their work into a single cake, which wins first prize. Mulia comes off as somewhat pompous, but is easily scared, as seen by her reaction to Pinkie's accusations.
Pluma	Penna	Female	White	Light Blue	Blue	None	1986	My Little Pony (TV series)	Susan Blu
Pluma is a female penna, a shape shifting bird and the granddaughter of Ruff, who once lived in Dream Valley before the ponies moved in. She has a mischievous personality, but sometimes nice. Also she has special skills on changing shape, even disguising herself as a ghost to scare away the residents of Paradise Estates. She is also a troubled girl, as she explains to Megan and the others that the reason she scared off everyone in Paradise Estates is that her grandfather is being held hostage by Squirk, a tyrant octopus and forced her to get the half of the Flash Stone. After she got the other half, Megan and the Ponies agreed to help her get the other half while stopping Squirk for flooding Dream Valley.
Ruff	Penna	Male	White (Young); Gray with green moss (Old)	Lavender (Young); None (Old)	Black	None	1986	My Little Pony (TV series)	Frank Welker
Ruff is a male penna and grandfather of Pluma. He and his people moved into Dream Valley. Squirk, who ruled Dream Valley with cruelty, refused to allow the Pennas to live there, and tries to fight them off. But Ruff stole the flashstone and broke it in two. He threw one half into the water and the other into the now-dry land which became Dream Valley. He knew Squirk could never retrieve the second half, making the first half useless. After centuries of waiting, Squirk had finally captured Ruff, who was now old and weak. Using him as a hostage, Squirk is forcing Pluma to work for him. Underwater, Fizzy and the others find and free Ruff. But before they can escape, Squirk returns and captures them as well. He holds them all in giant skull, bound with seaweed. The top jaw is held open by seaweed strands that is quickly being eaten away by turtles. They would be crushed by the skull's teeth once all the strands were gnawed through. At the same time, Squirk finally finds the other half of the amulet and uses the whole flashstone to flood Dream Valley. When Buttons and the Pennas free themselves and the others, they are too late to stop Squirk. When they make it to land, they return to Paradise Estate, Danny devises a plan to catch Squirk and Crank. They lure and trap him, and take the flashstone. Megan and Wind Whistler use it to stop the flood and banish Squirk underwater. They also restore the land and Paradise Estate, and then destroy the flashstone. Ruff and Pluma thank the ponies and return home.
Steven Magnet	Sea serpent	Male	Purple	Orange with yellow highlights	Black	None	2010	Friendship Is Magic	Lee Tockar
Steven Magnet is the sea serpent of the Everfree Forest. When the Mane 6 are on the way to get the Elements of Harmony, they see him crying because part of his mustache has ripped off by the rushing water waves via the spirit of Nightmare Moon. To calm him down, Rarity uses her Element of Generosity to give up her tail fixing his mustache and he gratefully helps her and the rest of her friends cross the calm river. Later in "Slice of Life", he comes to Ponyville to meet Matilda Donkey in the town spa.
Sting	Bee	Male	Yellow and Black	Orange	Black	None	1986	My Little Pony (TV series)	Michael Bell
Sting is one of Bumble's royal servants who resides in Bumbleland, which resides somewhere in Flutter Valley. Despite being a loyal bee to Bumble, Sting sided with the ponies after he felt betrayed by his own kind due to them leaving Bumbleland. After he captured Morning Glory and placed in a cage, she tries to explain the situation with the Sunstone and Flutter Valley to him, but he doesn't care. But when Morning Glory asks Sting if he would rather be flying and playing instead of working for Bumble, he starts to cry. He admits that he can't fly and that he never learned because he was never good at it. Morning Glory encourages him to try again, and when he learns, he becomes friends with her. But he still keeps her in the cage. Later on, he frees her and both of them go to the Human World to get help from Megan. After the ponies reclaimed the Sunstone, Sting himself stopped Bumble and the others from reclaiming it, saying that if Bumble leaves the Flutter Ponies alone, she can come to Flutter Valley and take flowers anytime. She agrees, and Sting returns to Bumbleland with her and the other bees.
The Bushwoolies	Bushwoolies	Various	Various	None	Various	None	1985	Escape from Katrina	Alice Playten; Sheryl Bernstein; Susan Blu; Nancy Cartwright; Russi Taylor; Charlie Adler; Frank Welker
The Bushwoolies are a group of adorable, brightly coloured furry creatures. They seem incapable of independent thought, thinking, speaking and acting as a group. They rarely use their individual names, which include Chumster, Hugster and Wishful.
Weston	Eagle	Male	Brown	White	Black	None	1987	My Little Pony (TV series)	Joey Camen
Weston is a male baby eagle chick with a brown body, and a white head; Who once joined Danny and Spike after separating from his parents in the episode "Spike's Search".
Thorax	Changeling	Male	Black, later green with an orange neck	Various shades of blue and purple when disguised as ponies	Light blue, later plum purple	Ancient Urn (as Crystal Hoof); Archery Bow (as Crystal Arrow)	2016	Friendship Is Magic	Kyle Rideout
Thorax is first befriended by Spike in the Crystal Empire. When Queen Chrysalis tries to drain the love from inside him, Starlight Glimmer assures him to share it and it suddenly becomes powered up to defeat her and destroy her throne. And with most changelings reformed, Thorax gains his orange antlers for he is their rightful leader. He, with some other reformed changelings also have studded crystals around their necks and together all their tails are dragonfly based as well as matched with the colors of their wings.
Twinkle Wish	Wishing Star	Female	Yellow	None	Blue	None	2009	Twinkle Wish Adventure	Tabitha St. Germain
Twinkle Wish is a wishing star. She is described in the legends of the Winter Wishes Festival as the one who grant every pony one special wish. She usually sleeps inside a box to get enough energy for the festival so she can grant everyone's wishes. She was "kidnapped" by Whimsey, leaving the ponies to get her back before the night of the festival.
Zecora	Zebra	Female	Black and White	Black and White	Turquoise	Spiral Sun	2010	Friendship Is Magic	Brenda Crichlow
Zecora is a Zebra who wears gold hoops in her ears and around her right or left foreleg (the animation is inconsistent) and neck, who lives in the middle of the Everfree Forest, in a hut with natural herbs, a cauldron, and various masks from her homeland. The ponies in Ponyville had never seen a unique creature as her, and so they would lock up their doors whenever she comes to visit. Although she was first thought to be an evil enchantress who could inflict curses, she is revealed to be very friendly and an expert herbalist. She is known for always talking in rhyme and speaks with an African accent.

== Antagonistic characters ==
These villains appear in the My Little Pony series.

=== My Little Pony 'n Friends ===
Name	Species	Gender	Body color	Hair color	Year of toy/animation debut	Special, Episode and Film debut	Voiced by
Tirac	Centaur	Male	Dark Gray	None	1984	Rescue at Midnight Castle	Victor Caroli
Tirac is a centaur with elements of a demon (mainly a Baphomet). He resides in the forbidden Midnight Castle alongside his minions and his loyal servant Scorpan, who he orders to kidnap the ponies of Dream Valley to execute his evil scheme. Tirac wields the Rainbow of Darkness, a powerful sack containing evil magic which corrupts everything it touches.It can even turn the ponies he captured into evil dragons which were used to pull his "Chariot of Darkness" and execute the event called the "Night that Never Ends", on which he will use the Rainbow of Darkness to corrupt Dream Valley and plunge it into chaos. When Tirac takes off in his Chariot of Darkness, Megan grabs the satchel containing the Rainbow of Darkness, but can't hold on to it. As he was about to release the Rainbow of Darkness, Megan opens the locket to reveal the Rainbow of Light. But it is only a small piece that is soon enveloped in darkness. But the Rainbow of Light starts fighting back, and eventually overpowers the Rainbow of Darkness. He was destroyed by the Rainbow of Light, freeing Scorpan from his spell and turning him back into his human form.
Scorpan	Demon Gargoyle (Corrupted form); Human (Purified form)	Male	Ash Brown	None	1984	Rescue at Midnight Castle	Ron Taylor
Scorpan is a demon gargoyle (originally a human being). As Spike mentioned in the special, Scorpan was once a human prince before Tirac destroyed his kingdom and corrupted him using the Rainbow of Darkness, turning him into his demonic form. Despite his appearance, he shows sympathy to the ponies who were being turned into evil dragons. It was shown the reason why he helped Tirac kidnap ponies was because Tirac threatened to harm Spike if he didn't. During the finale of the special, he was turned back into his human form.
Katrina	Humanoid Feline Witch	Female	Dark Brown	Orange	1985	Escape from Katrina	Tammy Grimes
Katrina is a Humanoid Feline Witch. Katrina herself is a powerful witch who is dependent upon the Witchweed potion, which is the source of her power. She holds the Bushwoolies her slaves and forces them to make the potion for her. After the Bushwoolies escape, she attempted on kidnapping the ponies to be her new slaves, but she is thwarted by the Rainbow of Light. She ends up kidnapping Baby Moondancer and the Rainbow of Light to force the ponies to be her new slaves. She was defeated by Rep and later redeemed herself of her bad ways by destroying the machine that produces the Witchweed Potion.
Rep	Shape Shifting Lizard	Male	Brown	None	1985	Escape from Katrina	Paul Williams
Rep is a Shape Shifting Lizard and Katrina's assistant. He can turn himself into any form he wishes and even use it as a disguise to blend in. Unlike Katrina, he understands the Bushwoolies, who were being fed up with Katrina's orders and tries to convince them to stay. He later on helped Megan and the ponies defeat Katrina and later redeemed themselves in the end.
Hydia	Witch	Female	None	Gray	1986	My Little Pony: The Movie	Cloris Leachman (movie); Tress MacNeille (series)
Hydia a powerful witch. She lives in the Volcano of Gloom alongside her daughters Reeka and Draggle and despises anything that is nice, pretty and beautiful and instead wants to make everything gloomy and dreary to suit her taste on living. She unleashes the Smooze, unstoppable purple ooze that will eat and destroy everything in its path. Also is making anyone who is splashed by it grumpy and woeful. However, the Flutter Ponies defeat the Hydia, her daughters and the Smooze by sending them back to the Volcano of Gloom. Later, Hydia decided to work with Queen Bumble to steal the Sunstone and use its power to direct the sun to allow plants and flowers to grow in Bumbleland, also slowly destroying Flutter Valley in the process. However, the ponies, humans, Spike, Bushwoolies, Furbobs and Stonebacks defeat her and her daughters again by sending them back to the Volcano of Gloom again.
Reeka	Witch	Female	None	Black	1986	My Little Pony: The Movie	Rhea Perlman (movie); Jennifer Darling (series)
Reeka is one of Hydia's two daughters. She is fatter and shorter than Draggle and only thinks of food rather than magic. She and Draggle help Hydia take over Ponyland but were defeated by the Flutter Ponies by being sent back to the Volcano of Gloom. Later, she and Draggle helped Hydia and Queen Bumble in stealing the Sunstone and use its power to direct the sun to allow plants and flowers to grow in Bumbleland, also slowly destroying Flutter Valley in the process. However, the ponies, humans, Spike, Bushwoolies, Furbobs and Stonebacks defeat Hydia and her daughters again by sending them back to the Volcano of Gloom again.
Draggle	Witch	Female	None	Orange	1986	My Little Pony: The Movie	Madeline Kahn (movie); Jennifer Darling (series)
Draggle is one of Hydia's two daughters. She is slimmer and taller than Reeka and struggles to do magic, and is thus seen as an embarrassment to the family. She and Reeka help Hydia take over Ponyland but were defeated by the Flutter Ponies by being sent back to the Volcano of Gloom. Later, she and Reeka helped Hydia and Queen Bumble in stealing the Sunstone and use its power to direct the sun to allow plants and flowers to grow in Bumbleland, also slowly destroying Flutter Valley in the process. However, the ponies, humans, Spike, Bushwoolies, Furbobs and Stonebacks defeat Hydia and her daughters again by sending them back to the Volcano of Gloom again.
Ahgg	One-Eyed Spider	Male	Dark Grey	None	1986	My Little Pony: The Movie	Peter Cullen (movie); Frank Welker (series)
Ahgg is a one-eyed giant pet spider to Hydia, Reeka and Draggle. He was sent by Hydia to prevent the Ponies and humans from reaching Flutter Valley. He had them trapped in a canyon but they tickle him, causing him to laugh which gives the ponies and humans time to climb up the cliff and escape. Later, Ahgg helps Hydia, Reeka and Draggle take over Flutter Valley and captures the visiting ponies and Spike. He was then sent by Hydia to prevent the other ponies humans and their friends from bringing the Sun Stone back to Flutter Valley and making him not ticklish this time. However, Megan has the Stonebacks dig under him and it causes him to fall.
Queen Bumble	Bee	Female	Yellow and Black	Orange	1986	The End of Flutter Valley	June Foray
Queen Bumble is the ruler of Bumbleland, a place located somewhere in Flutter Valley in which all the bees live after their exile. She usually has a cold personality and hated the Flutter Ponies for dumping her and her people in the freezing land and decided to work with Hydia to steal the Sunstone and use its power to direct the sun to allow plants and flowers to grow in Bumbleland, also slowly destroying Flutter Valley in the process. But she didn't know that the Sunstone can destroy her land due to too much heat, causing a fire that would burn everything in its path. In the end, she and the bees tried to reclaim the Sunstone from the Flutter Ponies, but Sting tries to stop Bumble. Rosedust intervenes and offers that if Bumble leaves the Flutter Ponies alone, she can come to Flutter Valley and take flowers anytime. She agrees, and Sting returns to Bumbleland with her and the other bees.
Squirk	Octopus	Male	Red	N/A	1986	The Ghost of Paradise Estate	Frank Welker
Squirk is an evil tyrannical octopus who once ruled Ponyland when it was covered by water with his artifact, the Flash Stone until Pluma's grandfather stole it from him and threw one half of the magical jewel in the water and the other half on the land where Paradise Estate would reside. Many years later, Squirk returned, captured Pluma's grandfather and blackmailed her into helping him get the other half of the Flash Stone. After getting the other half, he started to flood the lands until the ponies and their allies destroyed the Flash Stone and Squirk was banished again.
Gock	Monkey	Male	Brown	Light Brown	1986	The Great Rainbow Caper	Unknown
Gock along with Gluda are monkeys called The Gizmonks who are inventors of gizmos. They plan to steal the Rainbow of Light and capture Danny and Surprise for ransom. However, Danny and Surprise cause so much damage that the Gizmonks beg the ponies and humans to take Danny and Surprise back.
Gluda	Monkey	Female	Brown	Dark Brown	1986	The Great Rainbow Caper	Unknown
Gluda along with Gock are monkeys called The Gizmonks who are inventors of gizmos. They plan to steal the Rainbow of Light and capture Danny and Surprise for ransom. However, Danny and Surprise cause so much damage that the Gizmonks beg the ponies and humans to take Danny and Surprise back.
Princess Porcina	Pig	Female	Pink	Amber	1986	The Glass Princess Unknown	
Porcina is a pig princess that uses magic. She needs material to replace her magic cloak, which is all but worn out - she uses its magic to turn things into glass, as she's obsessed with her own reflection. The Raptorians work for her with the promise that they'll soon receive their own kingdom. Porcina deems the washing to be useless and tells the Raptorians to find something better. They capture Gusty, Heart Throb, and Lickety-Split in hope to use their hair to make her cloak. Porcina receives her new cloak, and happily turns the Paradise Estate and every other non-living thing in Ponyland to glass, much to the Little Ponies' horror. The chief Raptorian praises her efforts, but suggests that it might be even better if every creature in Ponyland also bore her reflection. She agrees, and casts a second spell, turning every Little Pony in the Paradise Estate to glass. Shady, Molly, Megan, North Star, Paradise, Magic Star, and the Bushwoolies made a fake cloak in hopes of pulling off a switch with the real one only for the Raptorians to catch onto them. Porcina starts the spell to turn the Ponies into glass, but confronting them face to face makes her realize she has no right. The chief Raptorian snatches her cloak and tries the spell himself, but finds he's holding the fake. A tug-of-war ensues over the real cloak, and it tears in half, releasing a bolt of energy that hits the Raptorians and turns them all into glass. Regretting her selfish actions, Porcina uses the remains of the cloak to restore the Little Ponies and everything else in Ponyland. The Bushwoolies destroy the cloak, then offer to take Porcina on as their groomer, and she agrees.
Raptorians	Raptorians	Male	Red (Shrock); Orange (long-eared raptorian); Yellow (sheepdog raptorian)	Red (Shrock); Brown pigtails (long-eared raptorian); Blonde (sheepdog raptorian)	1986	The Glass Princess	Cam Clarke; Charlie Adler; Townsend Coleman
The Raptorians are creatures with wolflike heads and birdlike bodies. They are showing an unusual interest in a washing line, using a magic mirror to show it to their mistress, a magic pig named Porcina. The Raptorians work for her with the promise that they'll soon receive their own kingdom. They capture Gusty, Lickety-Split, and Heart Throb in hopes to make a new cloak from their hair. The Raptorians leave the Ponies almost bald, but their hair instantly grows back to its original length. Delighted, the Raptorians set the Ponies to work weaving their own hair into a new cloak for Porcina. After Porcina turns Ponyland into glass, the Raptorians are delighted that they won't have to put up with her any longer. They later caught Megan and the ponies trying to switch cloaks. Porcina starts the spell to turn the Ponies into glass, but confronting them face to face makes her realize she has no right. The chief Raptorian snatches her cloak and tries the spell himself, but finds he's holding the fake. A tug-of-war ensues over the real cloak, and it tears in half, releasing a bolt of energy that hits the Raptorians and turns them all into glass.
Erebus	Cloud Demon	Male	Gray	N/A	1986	Bright Lights	Jim Cummings
Erebus is a malevolent Cloud Demon whose intention is to devour everyone's shadows to give him strength. He met Knight Shade in the village Grayvale one day, and promised he will boost his career and make him a star. ErEbus indeed drew almost the entire village to Knight Shade's next concert, stealing all their shadows, including that of Knight Shade's mother, and used them to turn himself into a powerful cloud of magic. Since then, Knight Shade has toured to increasing success, stealing ever more shadows for Erebus, hoping to keep his own shadow long enough to figure out a way to stop Erebus. While hunting for shadows, Erebus calls to Megan to come out of hiding, and she steps up, announcing that she has a surprise for him. A vast army of Flutter Ponies, brought by Molly and Lofty, fills the skies, circling Erebus and blasting him with their Utter Flutter. Unable to withstand the onslaught, Erebus grows smaller and smaller, and the shadows he contains fly out, seeking their original owners, both he and Zeb were placed in prison.
Zeb	Zebra	Male	Black and White	N/A	1986	Bright Lights	Unknown
Zeb is a greedy zebra and the manager of Knight Shade, who is working with Erebus, he employs giant rats to do his dirty work. He usually collect shadows using a strange machine and collects them in his satchel. The Flutter Ponies help the Little Ponies by getting Erebus to chase them, overexerting himself until he used up all his energy. As Zeb tries to recapture the shadows, an army of Greyvaleans surrounds him, placing him in shackles.
Grogar	Ram	Male	Ash Gray	N/A	1986	The Return of Tambelon	Michael Bell
Grogar is an evil ram and the leader of Tambelon, who once ruled Ponyland with an iron fist 500 years ago before he was defeated when the ancient bell was rung, banishing him and the city to the Shadow World. He then returned to Ponyland 500 years later, capturing all the Unicorn Ponies one by one and plans to capture everyone in Dream Valley to be banished to the Shadow World. He has a cold and antagonistic personality, always scolding Bray for his mistakes and sometimes abuses the Troggles so they can follow his orders and do what he wants. Grogar's powers comes from the bells on his neck, and he has superior magic skills even far beyond any Unicorn Pony ever existed. Grogar was defeated again by Megan after she rang the ancient bell for the second time, banishing him and the whole city back to the Shadow World.
Bray	Donkey	Male	Brown	N/A	1986	The Return of Tambelon	Frank Welker
Bray is a sneering donkey-like creature, who first appeared delivering the unicorns their disgusting meal and then reports to Grogar, the Ruler of Tambelon Megan has seen in her dreams. He is always loyal to Grogar but sometimes getting scolded by him when he makes mistakes.
The Flores	Flower Creatures	Male; Female	Light/Dark Green	Different Colors	1986	Fugitive Flowers	Tress MacNeille; Frank Welker; Unknown Voice Actors/Actresses
The Flores are flower criminals who pretend to be harmless and beautiful trick Posey into taking them into her garden and trick the ponies and humans into thinking that the Crabnasties are bad. They devour all the nutrients in the soil to become big and powerful. The ponies and humans realize their mistake and they along with the Crabnasties defeat the Flores and send them to prison.
Lavan	Lava Demon	Male	Red (Lava form); White and Blue (Crystal form)	None	1987	The Quest of the Princess Ponies	Unknown
Lavan is a malevolent lava demon who kidnaps the Princess Ponies and steal their magic wands since they contain all the magic in ponyland. He uses them to transform himself into an all-powerful crystal being but then was eventually destroyed by the Princess Ponies who used their magic through working together.
Dragon Gang	Dragons	Male	Green	None	1987	Spike's Search	Unknown
The Dragon Gang are three unnamed dragons who appeared as the main antagonists of "Spike's Search" - an episode from the original My Little Pony series. Spike, being a baby dragon, was becoming worried with his inability to control his fire-breath so set out to find a dragon to teach him how to control his powers - unfortunately he came across a gang of particularly brutish dragons, complete with a leader who fancied himself a king (wearing a crown). The Dragon Gang were rude and unwelcoming to Spike but their leader decided to allow Spike to come with them to see what being a dragon was about - however to Spike's dismay the Dragon Gang raided a nearby village, terrorizing the villagers and stealing their food. The Dragon Gang proceeded to leave the still burning village and laughed despite Spike saying what they were doing was wrong - Spike suggested that the Dragon Gang be more like the Little Ponies, which sparked the Dragon Gang's interest and they had Spike take them to the Little Ponies: though they were secretly planning on robbing the Ponies and were simply using Spike. However the Ponies were aware of what was happening and arranged a feast for the Dragon Gang, who greedily took the food and began to bully the Ponies - causing Spike to stand up to them: yet they refused to leave and so the Ponies let loose a trap they had set specifically for the troublesome dragons. Using a nearby waterfall they drenched the dragons, who hated being wet and fled the scene complaining that they were only "having fun". Spike decides he is better off without the Dragon Gang and says he wanted to learn how to be a dragon and not a bully.
Somnambula	Human Witch	Female	None	Black (young form); Grey (old form)	1987	Somnambula	Unknown
Somnambula is a witch whose powers are stronger when she is younger. She has a canary named Kyrie whom she holds prisoner. She makes Kyrie sing to attract the ponies in a trance. As soon as Somnambula was younger she creates a magical circus and leads the ponies to it. She takes away the youth of the earth and pegasus ponies to make her younger and the youth of the unicorn ponies to make her powers stronger and stores them in a crystal. She also created illusions of the Big Brother Ponies' fantasies to keep them distracted. Kyrie aids the Baby Ponies and Spike in rescuing the other ponies. Seeing Buttons in agony, Slugger destroys the crystal causing Somnambula to rapidly age back to an old woman. The circus disappears and the ponies regain their youth.

=== G1 My Little Pony Comics ===
Name	Species	Gender	Body color	Hair color	Eye color	Debut year	Comic debut
The Ice-Cream Witch	Witch	Female	Pink	None	None	1986	Sweetie and The Wrong Recipe
The Ice-Cream Witch is the Ruler of the Ice-Cream Land who capture the Goblins making they to work with Ice Cream when the ponies enter to the Ice Cream Land she took them and making they to work but Sweetie use a magic spell making her, her friends and the globins escape.
Jewel Wizard	Human	Male	None	None	White	1987	Applejack's Amazing Adventure
The Jewel Wizard is a Wizard who capture two ponies and Applejack to get gems for him but Applejack escapes and charges into his throne and breaks into a million pieces, making the wizard fall into a deep hole.
The Red Cloud	Cloud	N/A	Red	None	Red	1986	Ponyland in Danger
The Red Cloud is a cloud monster who came to Ponyland to claim Ponyland if he found something red but luckily the ponies and Spike hid everything red and the Red Cloud disappeared.
The Sea Monsters	Sea Monsters	N/A	Green	N/A	None	1986	Where is Seaspray?
The Sea Monsters are horrible monsters that live in the sea. They capture Seaspray and one disguised as Mr. Dolphin and try to capture Surfdancer and Wawebreaker, but their plans was spoiled by the sea ponies.
Wizard Wantall	Human	Male	None	Brown	None	1986	Where is The Waterfall??
Wizard Wantall is a Wizard who tried to take the rainbow and the waterfall of Ponyland but Bow Tie and Medley foil his plan and tied him with the rainbow.

=== Friendship is Magic ===
Name	Species	Gender	Body color	Hair or mane color	Eye color	Special, Episode and Film debut	Voiced by
Nightmare Moon	Alicorn	Female	Dark Navy Blue	Blue	Aqua	Friendship is Magic	Tabitha St. Germain
Nightmare Moon is the corrupted form of Princess Luna. Over time of raising and setting the moon, Luna became convinced that while the ponies all loved her sister Celestia, they sleep through her night and ignore her. Jealous of her sister, she caused a solar eclipse which transformed her into Nightmare Moon. Celestia then reluctantly harnessed the power of the Elements of Harmony and banished her to the moon, taking responsibility for both sun and moon and maintaining harmony in Equestria. In the season one premiere, "Friendship is Magic", Nightmare Moon escapes a thousand years later and attempts to take over Equestria. Twilight Sparkle and her new friends eventually manage to defeat Nightmare Moon by finding and using the Elements of Harmony against her. After being restored to her original form and sharing a tearful reunion with Celestia, Luna returns to ruling alongside her once more. Nightmare Moon appears in nightmares and flashbacks onwards. In the official IDW comic series, Nightmare Moon is shown to be a symbiotic force that convinced Luna to turn against her sister, feeding off of her insecurities to take control of her mind and body. She is also revealed to be capable of corrupting other beings into serving her, which she did so with the Nyx, creatures who inhabit the moon and create dreams for ponies. After Luna was freed by the Elements of Harmony, Nightmare Moon survived and hatched a plot to take control of one of the Element bearers, rendering the other Elements of Harmony useless against her. She ultimately ends up possessing Rarity when the Nightmare Forces convince her that her friends will eventually abandon her. Dubbed Nightmare Rarity, she leads an assault on Ponyville, but is ultimately defeated when the other Element bearers use memories of Rarity to free her from Nightmare Moon's control, with some added help from Celestia and Luna. Her status after Rarity was freed is unknown.
Discord	Draconequus	Male	Multicolor (true form); Blue (as Grogar)	White eyebrows and facial hair/black mane (true form); White (as Grogar)	Yellow with red pupils (both in his true form and as Grogar)	The Return of Harmony (true form); The Beginning of the End (as Grogar)	John de Lancie (true form); Doc Harris (as Grogar)
According to Princess Celestia, Discord is the ancient spirit of chaos who, before the reign of Celestia and Luna, ruled the land of Equestria, making the lives of unicorns, pegasi, and earth ponies miserable. In a battle over 1000 years ago, before Nightmare Moon was banished to the moon, the sisters wielded the Elements of Harmony and turned Discord into a stone statue. In the season two premiere, "The Return of Harmony", Discord's statue is on display in the gardens around the royal palace, until the inharmonious aura caused by the quarrels of the Cutie Mark Crusaders give him enough strength to break free of his prison. He lures the Mane 6 into a maze and is able to make them abandon the qualities that make them bearers of the Elements. The result ends pitting them against one another, rendering the Elements of Harmony useless. However, despite his efforts, Twilight manages to restore all of her friend's true elements and they face Discord using the Elements of Harmony, defeating him by sealing him back to his original stone form, albeit this time with a look of horror frozen on his face. He reappears in the season three episode "Keep Calm and Flutter On" when Celestia gives the girls the task to reform Discord. Fluttershy is eventually able to do so, becoming his first friend and showing him how important friendship is to him. In the two-part season four premiere, "Princess Twilight Sparkle", Discord is revealed to have planted powerful plants known as Plunderseeds in an attempt to destroy the Tree of Harmony, from which the Elements originated. After the Mane 6 destroy them by returning the Elements to the tree, Discord admits that he didn't tell this to Twilight because he wanted her to learn that even though she is now an alicorn princess, her friendship with the others will not change. Later in "Three's A Crowd", he tests Twilight to see if she really cares for him by tricking her and Princess Cadance into finding a plant that will cure him of a disease he made up. In the season four finale, "Twilight's Kingdom" Discord is tasked by Celestia with finding and capturing Lord Tirek. However, Tirek tricks him into betraying his friends, giving him a necklace as a token of gratitude and loyalty. After he captures the non-princess ponies for Tirek, he double-crosses Discord by stealing his powers and admits that the necklace has no meaning to him, for it was given to him by his traitorous brother, Scorpan. After a fight between Twilight and Tirek that results in a draw, Tirek trades all of Twilight's magic for her friends and Discord. Discord admits that he now understands the true meaning of friendship and gives Twilight the necklace. The necklace turns out to be the sixth and final key needed to access the chest at the Tree of Harmony. The Mane 6 take it as Tirek starts going on a mindless rampage and they use the newly unlocked Rainbow Power to transport Tirek back to his imprisonment and save Equestria. Discord appears in later episodes as a reluctant ally of the Mane Six, occasionally causing mischief while struggling to become a better friend to them. In season nine, he helps Twilight track down and defeat Queen Chrysalis, Tirek, and Cozy Glow by disguising himself as Grogar, a blue ram who ruled Equestria several millennia ago until he was defeated by Gusty the Great. He then tricks the three villains into forming an alliance with each other so the Mane Six can defeat them and Twilight would have the confidence needed to succeed Celestia and Luna as ruler of Equestria.
Queen Chrysalis	Changeling	Female	Black	Dark Green	Teal	A Canterlot Wedding	Kathleen Barr
Queen Chrysalis is the queen of the changelings, a race of shapeshifting pony-like insects that feed off of love. In the season two finale, "A Canterlot Wedding", she takes the form of Princess Cadance so that she could feed off of Shining Armor's love, whom she plans to keep for herself so she and her subjects have a constant food supply and power. With that, they can conquer Canterlot and assume control over Equestria. Twilight Sparkle had seen all the signs throughout the organizing of the wedding, but was dismissed as being too possessive of her brother. To prevent Twilight's further interference, and the threat of the Elements of Harmony being used against her, Chrysalis forcibly teleports Twilight to the forgotten diamond caves under Canterlot. However, the Queen makes a disastrous error taunting Twilight in an attempt to anger her to the point where she would kill Princess Cadance, who is also being held in the mines. Instead, the prisoners recognized each other and escaped the mines to expose the Queen at the wedding ceremony. Even though Chrysalis had gained enough power to enable her species to invade Canterlot while she personally struck down Celestia, she had not counted on Twilight enabling Cadance to free her fiancé and using their combined power to cast the changelings out of Equestria. In the season six finale, "To Where and Back Again", as an act of revenge against Twilight, whom she holds responsible for her defeat, she launches a mass invasion on Equestria, replacing the Mane 6, Spike, the Princesses, Shining Armor, and Flurry Heart with changelings. However, she is ultimately defeated and dethroned as the changeling's ruler by Thorax, a benevolent changeling who, along with Starlight Glimmer, convinces the changelings to share love rather than steal it. Starlight offers Chrysalis a chance for redemption, but she rejects it and flees, vowing revenge on Starlight. In the season eight episode, "The Mean 6", Chrysalis creates clones of the Mane Six to take control of the Elements of Harmony but the clones betray her before they are destroyed by the Tree of Harmony and Chrysalis escapes again. In season nine, Chrysalis is summoned by "Grogar" (Discord in disguise) who tricks her into joining his team of villains, bent on conquering Equestria and defeating the Mane Six. Chrysalis initially has issues working with Cozy Glow and Tirek, but she later learns to cooperate with them in order to finally conquer Equestria, steal magic, and defeat her enemies once and for all. Chrysalis and her cohorts are sent to retrieve an ancient artifact known as the Bewitching Bell that once belonged to the real Grogar, and they use it in their scheme to gain its magic and betray "Grogar", which also exposes him as Discord. Chrysalis and her cohorts are briefly victorious when they defeat the Mane Six and their allies and imprison them while Twilight Sparkle escapes. However, after the rest of the Mane Six escape and the windigos appear as a result of their evil scheme to create distrust among ponies, Chrysalis and the other villains face off against the Mane Six and their army of allies in a grand battle. Chrysalis and her cohorts are defeated and de-powered back to her normal form. As punishment for their crimes, Chrysalis, Tirek, and Cozy Glow are imprisoned in stone by the combined magic of Discord, Celestia, and Luna. In the official IDW comic series, Chrysalis is a recurring villain who again seeks revenge on Twilight for defeating her.
King Sombra	Unicorn	Male	Grey	Black	Scarlet and green	The Crystal Empire	Jim Miller (The Crystal Empire); Alvin Sanders (The Beginning of the End)
King Sombra is a unicorn described by Princess Celestia as having "a heart as black as night". Prior to Nightmare Moon's banishment, he took over the Crystal Empire and enslaved the native Crystal Ponies before being overthrown by the Royal Sisters, who imprisoned him in the Frozen North just beyond the Empire. However, Sombra managed to curse the Empire, causing it to disappear upon his defeat. In the season three premiere, "The Crystal Empire", he and the Crystal Empire return one thousand years later, and Twilight Sparkle and Spike search for the Crystal Heart, the only thing capable of defeating him. Due to a trap at the top of the Crystal Castle, Sombra manages to capture Twilight, but Spike is able to take the Crystal Heart to Cadance. Cadance flies Spike and the Crystal Heart down to the Crystal Ponies, who are able to power up the heart and defeat Sombra with a blast of light which causes him to shatter into several pieces. In the season nine premiere, "The Beginning of the End", he is resurrected by "Grogar" (Discord in disguise), who tries to persuade him into working together with Chrysalis, Tirek, and Cozy Glow to defeat the Mane 6 and take over Equestria. Sombra refuses, preferring to take over Equestria himself, proving to be pompous and arrogant. He takes over the Crystal Empire and is seemingly destroyed by the Elements of Harmony, but this turns out to be a trick so they'll lead him to the Tree of Harmony, which he destroys. Sombra proceeds to take over Ponyville, brainwashing the ponies to attack Canterlot. After Sombra "injures" Discord while attacking Fluttershy, the Mane 6 discover they have the power to defeat Sombra themselves, and destroy him with a magic explosion powered by their friendship. "Grogar" does not revive him again, using him as a warning to secure Chrysalis, Tirek, and Cozy Glow's loyalty. In the official IDW comic series, Sombra was revealed to be a shadow pony (or umbrum), created to free an army of shadow ponies imprisoned below the Crystal Empire. Born with no knowledge of his true purpose, Sombra was taken in by the Crystal Ponies, but was ridiculed by his classmates for his strangeness. The only friend he had among them was a fellow unicorn named Radiant Hope, who gained powerful healing magic as she got older. Fearing that Hope would abandon him upon learning that she was invited to study under Celestia and Luna, Sombra ran off into the Frozen North in fear and discovered a red crystal claiming to be his mother. Learning of his true heritage and mission (to destroy the Crystal Heart), Sombra enslaved the Empire after turning its original ruler, Princess Amore, into a black crystal statue that he broke into several pieces and scattered around the world. Radiant Hope informed the Royal Sisters of what had happened, sealing Sombra's fate. In the present day, Sombra is revealed to have survived his defeat and Radiant Hope leads an attack on the Crystal Empire during which she restores Sombra to his physical form. He quickly manages to defeat the Mane 6 after rallying Queen Chrysalis, the Changelings, Iron Will, the Flim-Flam Brothers, and Lightning Dust under him. Celestia and Luna try to stop him, but interference from Hope allows Sombra to turn them both to stone. He then retires to his private study to rest. Meanwhile, Hope takes Cadence to the umbrum's home where they learn of the umbrum's true nature and are forced to escape, ending up in Sombra's study, where the Mane 6, Spike, and Shining Armor arrive after being freed from imprisonment. After Hope takes a blast from Twilight meant for him, Sombra unleashes the umbrum on the assembled ponies. Sombra successfully retakes the empire, but Hope resents him for his decisions and informs him that she gave up her future as a princess to try and save him from his fate. When the Mane 6 return to the Empire with reinforcements to free Twilight, Shining, and the other princesses, Sombra has a change of heart and uses the Crystal Heart to banish the umbrum back to their prison. As Sombra is about to be killed by the Crystal Heart's energies, Hope uses her magic to hold his physical form together and the princesses turn him into a real unicorn as a sign of forgiveness. Sombra and Hope then leave to find the pieces of Princess Amore's statue and eventually restore her.
Lord Tirek	Centaur	Male	Red and Gray	Black	Red	Twilight's Kingdom	Mark Acheson
Lord Tirek is a tyrannical magic-stealing centaur who came with his brother, Scorpan, to steal Equestria's magic. However, Scorpan came to appreciate the ways of Equestria and urged his brother to abandon their plans but when Tirek refused, Scorpan alerted the princesses of Tirek's plan. Tirek was then sent to Tartarus for his crimes while Scorpan left to return to their home land. In the season four finale, "Twilight's Kingdom", it is revealed that Tirek managed to escape Tartarus and he is able to convince Discord to join forces with him and steals magic from the ponies of Equestria, growing progressively larger and more powerful with each attack, but later double-crosses Discord and steals his magic. Soon, Tirek finds Twilight, and after a long fight that results in a draw, he trades Twilight's friends in exchange for her magic. He is later defeated by Twilight and her friends and imprisoned back in Tartarus. In the season eight finale, "School Raze", Lord Tirek conspires with Cozy Glow all for the sake of revenge against the Mane Six, trapping them in Tartarus alongside him. But after suffering from Pinkie Pie's antics, Tirek reluctantly helps them escape and Cozy Glow is defeated, imprisoned in Tartarus alongside the evil centaur. In season nine, Cozy Glow and Tirek are freed by "Grogar" (Discord in disguise) who tricks them into joining his team of villains, bent on conquering Equestria and defeating the Mane Six. Tirek initially has issues working with Cozy Glow and Chrysalis, but he later learns to cooperate with them in order to finally conquer Equestria, steal magic, and defeat his enemies once and for all. Tirek and his cohorts are sent to retrieve an ancient artifact known as the Bewitching Bell that once belonged to the real Grogar, and they use it in their scheme to gain its magic and betray "Grogar", which also exposes him as Discord. Tirek and his cohorts are briefly victorious when they defeat the Mane Six and their allies and imprison them while Twilight Sparkle escapes. However, after the rest of the Mane Six escaped and the windigos appear as a result of their evil scheme to create distrust among ponies, Tirek and the other villains face off against the Mane Six and their army of allies in a grand battle. Tirek and his cohorts are defeated and de-powered back to his weakest form. As punishment for their crimes, Tirek, Chrysalis, and Cozy Glow are imprisoned in stone by the combined magic of Discord, Celestia, and Luna. In the IDW comics, a younger Tirek appears in FIENDship is Magic #2, where he had a poor relationship with his own family and is trained to steal magic by his mentor, Sendak the Elder.
Starlight Glimmer	Unicorn	Female	Light purple	Dark purple with normal purple and turquoise streaks	Blue	The Cutie Map	Kelly Sheridan
Starlight Glimmer, first appearing the season five premiere "The Cutie Map", is initially the leader of a town where everyone has given up their Cutie Marks. She is able to remove Cutie Marks using an artifact called the "Staff of Sameness" and store them in a hidden vault. She is later revealed to have been hiding her own Cutie Mark and using the Staff of Sameness as a front to hide her powerful magic. Afterwards, the townsfolk and Mane 6 reclaim their Cutie Marks and Starlight disappears. She believes the only way to achieve true friendship is for everyone to be equal, believing that having individual talents will lead to others bragging that they are better than others. In the season five finale "The Cutie Re-Mark", it is revealed that her beliefs stem from being abandoned by her childhood friend Sunburst after he received his cutie mark. Perfecting a spell originally created by Star Swirl, she travels back in time to stop Rainbow Dash from performing the Sonic Rainboom, causing several alternate futures when Twilight and Spike attempt to stop her. Twilight ultimately convinces Starlight to put aside her agenda and learn about friendship in Ponyville. She appears as a recurring character in season six onwards.
Stygian	Unicorn	Male	Medium grey	Moderate cerulean with arctic blue streaks	Brilliant azure	Shadow Play	Bill Newton
Stygian, also known as the Pony of Shadows, is a scholar and the founder of the Pillars of Equestria, who brought the six heroes together to save his home. After the rescue, Stygian sought to join the Pillars in battle, but lacked any power of his own, and thus attempted to make copies of their signature artifacts. However, the Pillars believed he was out to steal their powers and cast him out. He was then transformed into a monstrous pony made entirely of shadows and had desires to cover the entirety of Equestria. He was banished alongside the Pillars to limbo for over a thousand years, until being set free by Twilight. Weak after being in limbo, the Pony of Shadows retreats to the darkest corners of Equestria to regain his strength. In the end, the Mane Six and the Pillars help free Stygian from the darkness after they learn that he was only trying to use their artifacts to become their equal, and the Pony of Shadows is banished back to limbo while Stygian forgives the Pillars for their mistake. In the episode "The Last Problem", he attends Twilight's coronation, along with the Pillars.
The Storm King	Unknown	Male	Gray	White	Blue	My Little Pony: The Movie	Liev Schreiber
The Storm King is a fearsome satyr-like tyrant who has conquered half the world with the help of his army of yeti-like Storm Creatures. He launches an invasion in Equestria led by his second-in-command Tempest Shadow, and succeeds in absorbing the magic of all four alicorns into his mystical Staff of Sacanas, betraying Tempest when she is no longer of use to him. He creates a powerful tornado to destroy Canterlot, but Twilight manages to take the staff from him and disperse the storm. The Storm King throws an Obsidian Orb at the Mane 6 in an attempt to turn them to stone, but Tempest jumps in front of them, turning both her and the Storm King to stone and sending the Storm King falling off the castle balcony, shattering to pieces.
Tempest Shadow	Unicorn	Female	Dark purple	Dark red	Turquoise	My Little Pony: The Movie	Emily Blunt
Commander Tempest Shadow is a broken-horned purple unicorn and lieutenant to the Storm King. She joined the Storm King in hopes that he could restore her damaged horn (which was broken by an Ursa Minor when she was a filly, leaving her magic dangerously unstable). She spends much of the film chasing after the Mane 6, eventually capturing Twilight so the Storm King can absorb her magic. The Storm King reveals he was only using Tempest and tries to destroy her, but Twilight saves her, leading to her redemption. She nearly sacrifices herself to defeat the Storm King, but is saved by Twilight. At the Friendship Festival, she uses her magic to create fireworks, and reveals her real name is Fizzlepop Berrytwist. In the season nine finale, "The Ending of the End", she along with the Mane Six's allies face off against Chrysalis, Tirek and Cozy Glow and defeat them and then in the episode, "The Last Problem", she attends Twilight's coronation.
Grubber	Hedgehog	Male	Dark grey	White	Turquoise	My Little Pony: The Movie	Michael Peña
Grubber is a pug-faced hedgehog who serves as an assistant to both the Storm King and Tempest Shadow in the 2017 film. Despite his small stature, he hails from a tribe of hardened warriors and earned his place in the Storm King's employ due to his wisecracking and cunning.
Chancellor Neighsay	Unicorn	Male	Light azureish gray	Dark grayish azure	Moderate turquoise	School Daze	Maurice LaMarche
Chancellor Neighsay is the head of the Equestrian Educational Association (EEA) who first appears in the season eight premiere "School Daze." Displaying a strict regard for rules and regulations and a prejudice against non-ponies, he was appalled upon learning that Twilight Sparkle had invited several of them to attend her School of Friendship. He withdrew EEA approval from the school and sealed it off, offending several non-pony leaders in the process. After Twilight broke the seal, intending to run the school under her own rules, Neighsay appeared and opposed her. However, he was overruled, and departed with a dire warning of what he believed these events would allow. In "Friendship University", he gives credit to the Flim Flam Brothers' school due to it being a pony only environment. However, Twilight and Rarity exposed the brothers' scam and the school is shut down. In the season eight finale, "School Raze", he takes control of the School of Friendship and accuses the Young Six of being the ones draining Equestria of its magic. However, Cozy Glow causes a school uprising against him and takes back control of the School of Friendship. He is later freed by the Young Six and leaves for Canterlot to warn the princesses of Cozy Glow's plans. He later apologizes to Twilight and the Young Six after realizing how wrong he was about non-ponies. In the season nine finale, "The Ending of the End", he along with the Mane Six's allies face off against Chrysalis, Tirek and Cozy Glow and defeat them.
Cozy Glow	Pegasus; Alicorn (temporarily, formerly)	Female	Pink	Pale, light grayish arctic blue and light arctic bluish gray	Moderate scarlet	Marks For Effort	Sunni Westbrook
Cozy Glow is a small pink pegasus and former student of the School of Friendship. Her Cutie Mark is reddish rook from the game Chess suggesting correctly about her high intellect despite her age. In season eight, she was a student of the School of Friendship until the season eight finale, "School Raze", she attempts to take all of Equestria's magic and become the Empress of Friendship. When Chancellor Neighsay takes control of the school, Cozy Glow usurps it back by causing a school uprising against him. However, the Young Six along with the Tree of Harmony foil Cozy Glow's plot and the magic is returned to Equestria. Cozy Glow is sent to Tartarus for her crimes next to Tirek who helped her steal the magic in the first place. In season nine, Cozy Glow and Tirek are freed by "Grogar" (Discord in disguise) who tricks them into joining his team of villains, bent on conquering Equestria and defeating the Mane Six. Cozy Glow initially has issues working with Tirek and Chrysalis, but she later learns to cooperate with them in order to finally conquer Equestria, steal magic, and defeat her enemies once and for all. Cozy Glow and her cohorts are sent to retrieve an ancient artifact known as the Bewitching Bell that once belonged to the real Grogar, and they use it in their scheme to gain its magic and betray "Grogar", which also exposes him as Discord. Cozy Glow and her cohorts are briefly victorious when they defeat the Mane Six and their allies and imprison them while Twilight Sparkle escapes. However, after the rest of the Mane Six escape and the windigos appear as a result of their evil scheme to create distrust among ponies, Cozy Glow and the other villains face off against the Mane Six and their army of allies in a grand battle. Cozy Glow and her cohorts are defeated and de-powered back to her normal form. As punishment for their crimes, Cozy Glow, Tirek, and Chrysalis are imprisoned in stone by the combined magic of Discord, Celestia, and Luna.
Grogar	Ram	Male	Blue	White	Red	The Beginning of the End (Discord's disguise)	Doc Harris
Grogar is a blue ram sorcerer who once ruled the land that would become Equestria with an iron fist several millennia ago as its emperor back when it was only a mere collection of farms and pastures. He became known as the "Father of Monsters" after he created the foulest of creatures and allowed them to terrorize the ponies. He also wielded an ancient artifact known as the Bewitching Bell to make himself stronger. He was then confronted by Gusty the Great and her unicorn warriors and after battling them, Gusty stole Grogar's Bewitching Bell and banished him. In season nine, Discord disguises himself as Grogar to trick Queen Chrysalis, Lord Tirek, and Cozy Glow into forming an alliance with each other in an effort to prepare Twilight as the new ruler of Equestria, but this ends up backfiring when the villains retrieve the real Grogar's Bewitching Bell and steal Discord's magic which also exposes him of his Grogar disguise.

=== Equestria Girls ===
Name	Species	Gender	Body color	Hair or mane color	Eye color	Special, Episode and Film debut	Voiced by
Sunset Shimmer (Former)	Unicorn	Female	Yellow	Red and Yellow	Teal	My Little Pony: Equestria Girls	Rebecca Shoichet
Sunset Shimmer is Princess Celestia's former student who went rogue after not getting what she desired as quickly as she wanted, causing her to abandon her studies and go her own path in the human world. There, she drove the Mane 6's counterparts apart and quickly becomes known as the school bully. However, when Twilight Sparkle is able to become the princess of the Fall Formal, Sunset Shimmer kidnaps Spike and wants to have Twilight's crown in exchange for the portal back to Equestria. Twilight denies the offer which sparks a fight. Sunset Shimmer is able to get Twilight's crown and transforms herself into a powerful demon. However, Twilight is able to evoke the powers of the Elements of Harmony when her friends move to protect her from Sunset Shimmer's attack. She is then defeated by the Mane 6 and reverted into her human form. In the sequel Rainbow Rocks, Sunset has reformed from her past ways and is trying to make amends for all that she's done. However, the Mane 6's human counterparts are the only ones showing her sympathy and friendship, as everyone else is distrustful of her. Over the course of the film, Sunset is ultimately the one who helps to keep the friends together as the Sirens' spells begin to affect them and assists them in the final confrontation, gaining a half-pony form in the process. After the Dazzlings are defeated, she becomes a backing vocalist and leading guitarist for the Rainbooms, the band the Mane 6's human counterparts formed for the musical showcase. Sunset gains telepathic empathy in Legend of Everfree.
The Dazzlings	Siren (all three)	Female (all three)	Yellow (Adagio Dazzle); Violet (Aria Blaze); Blue (Sonata Dusk)	Orange with yellow streaks (Adagio Dazzle); Dark purple with green streaks (Aria Blaze); Turquoise with dark blue streaks (Sonata Dusk)	Violet (all three)	My Little Pony: Equestria Girls – Rainbow Rocks	Kazumi Evans (Adagio Dazzle); Diana Kaarina (Aria Blaze, speaking); Shylo Sharity (Aria Blaze, singing); Maryke Hendrikse (Sonata Dusk, speaking); Madeline Merlo, Shannon Chan-Kent (Sonata Dusk, singing)
The Dazzlings are a trio of sirens who wreaked havoc across Equestria more than one thousand years ago by using their hypnotic songs to feed off of the aggression generated by their victims. Star Swirl was able to defeat them by sending them to the human world, but they were able to retain their magic through their pendants. In Rainbow Rocks, they persuade most of the Canterlot High student body to turn a musical showcase into a Battle of the Bands. By the end of the film, Twilight Sparkle, Sunset Shimmer, and the human counterparts of the rest of the Mane 6 and DJ PON-3 are able to defeat them, shattering their pendants and rendering them tone deaf, and they are promptly booed off the stage. Adagio Dazzle is the Dazzling's leader, who is characterized as cruel, sadistic, cunning, and manipulative. Aria Blaze speaks in a deadpan tone and always offers sarcasm to her fellow Sirens. Sonata Dusk is shown to be airheaded and the least intelligent of the three and acts as a source of comic relief.
Principal Abacus Cinch	Human	Female	Aqua	Dark purple with normal purple streaks	Purple	My Little Pony: Equestria Girls – Friendship Games	Iris Quinn
Principal Cinch is the headmistress of the Crystal Prep Academy. Cinch is extremely proud of her school, holding high expectations from her students and willing to do anything to uphold the school's reputation. She considers Twilight's human counterpart to be her star pupil. Cinch is indirectly responsible for the creation of Midnight Sparkle by pressuring Twilight into releasing the magic inside her pendant during the Friendship Games. After Sunset Shimmer manages to rescue Twilight, Cinch is forced to allow the games to be declared a tie after Celestia, Luna, and Dean Cadance convince her that no one will believe her accounts of magic being used at any point during the games. In the half-hour special "Dance Magic", it is mentioned that Cadance is now principal of Crystal Prep, with no mention of Cinch's whereabouts.
Midnight Sparkle	Human	Female	Dark Purple	Dark purple with pink and purple streaks	Cyan	My Little Pony: Equestria Girls – Friendship Games	Tara Strong
Midnight Sparkle is the corrupted alter ego of Twilight Sparkle's human counterpart, created by Cinch's pressure to release the magic she carried throughout the film. Midnight is characterized as a psychotic version of Twilight, extremely powerful and wanting nothing more than to take Equestria's magic for herself. Sunset Shimmer manages to stop her and convinces Twilight that true magic comes from friendship. Twilight is later plagued by nightmares of Midnight in The Legend of Everfree, fearing that she will take over if she attempts to use magic again. With help from Sunset and the Mane 6's human counterparts, Twilight manages to overcome her fear, preventing her from worrying about Midnight resurfacing ever again.
Gloriosa Daisy	Human	Female	Magenta	Dark Purple	Green	My Little Pony: Equestria Girls – Legend of Everfree	Enid-Raye Adams; Kelly Metzger (singing role)
Gloriosa Daisy appears as the counselor of Camp Everfree and Timber Spruce's older sister. While appearing chipper throughout most of the film, Sunset and Twilight later discover that Filthy Rich is trying to foreclose on Camp Everfree and that Gloriosa is using seven mysterious gems filled with Equestrian magic to try and make things better, accidentally causing a number of problems to occur which Timber tries to cover up using a ghost story about a creature named Gaea Everfree. Ultimately, Gloriosa ends up absorbing magic from all seven gems at once, transforming into a corrupted form similar in description to Gaea Everfree. The Mane 7 are ultimately able to stop her and she apologizes for the hassle she caused. The Mane 7 also manage to organize a concert event which successfully raises enough money to save the camp.
Juniper Montage	Human	Female	Pale, light-grayish olive	Strong cerulean with moderate arctic blue streaks	Moderate azure	Movie Magic	Ali Liebert
Juniper Montage is the niece of film director Canter Zoom, debuting in the second half-hour Equestria Girls special "Movie Magic". Acting as her uncle's personal gofer on set, she secretly hoped to be cast in the lead role in an upcoming Daring Do movie, but was passed over in favor of another actress, Chestnut Magnifico. In retaliation, Juniper secretly sabotaged several important sets and props related to the film, putting its production in jeopardy in hopes that she would drive Chestnut away. However, the Mane 7 are able to expose her and Canter bans her from the studio, though he does forgive her. In "Mirror Magic", Canter gets Juniper a job as a movie usher at the Canterlot Mall out of pity. She soon comes across a mirror enchanted with Equestrian magic and sees herself as a famous movie star. Keeping the mirror for herself, Juniper becomes obsessed with it to the point of vanity, even discovering that she can trap things inside of it. She later takes her revenge on the Mane 7 by trapping them in the mirror and absorbing their magic, transforming her into a monstrous version of how she saw herself in the mirror initially. In her monstrous state, Juniper sees everyone running from her as her adoring public. Starlight Glimmer, who was visiting the human world at the time, is able to stop Juniper by offering her friendship instead of fame, and Juniper undoes all the damage she caused with the mirror and is restored to her original form. Afterwards, the Mane 7 and Starlight accept her as one of their friends.
Wallflower Blush	Human	Female	Light greenish gray	Moderate aquamarine	Grayish tangelo	My Little Pony: Equestria Girls – Forgotten Friendship	Shannon Chan-Kent
A female student at Canterlot High who is constantly overlooked and ignored. She finds an Equestrian artifact, the Memory Stone, and uses it to make Sunset's friends forget their friendship with her. She ultimately repents and lets the girls destroy the stone, restoring the stolen memories, and gains recognition for her gardening activities.
Vignette Valencia	Human	Female	Light yellow	Gradient of grayish crimson to light magentaish gray with light gray streaks	Light brilliant cornflower blue	My Little Pony: Equestria Girls – Rollercoaster of Friendship	Tegan Moss
Vignette Valencia is a female adult who is in charge of public relations for the Equestria Land amusement park. Her mobile phone becomes saturated with Equestrian magic, allowing her to erase things that displease her and replace them with images of more satisfactory items. The girls destroy the phone and persuade her to try to improve herself without exploiting others.
PostCrush	Human (both)	Female (both)	(Information required.)	(Information required.)	(Information required.)	My Little Pony: Equestria Girls – Sunset's Backstage Pass	Lili Beaudoin (Kiwi Lollipop); Mariee Devereux (Supernova Zap)
PostCrush are group of pop music duo and the main antagonists of the My Little Pony: Equestria Girls – Sunset's Backstage Pass special. Both of them are vocalists, but Kiwi is a guitarist while Supernova is a drummer. As seen on Sunset's Backstage Pass, Kiwi and Supernova were struggling as they strolled until she saw a glow and that glow was a magic time twirler from Equestria, the time twirler made time repeat so she put the time twirler in her bow and began to redo the day for the show to be perfect. But when Sunset and Pinkie went to give her churros and Sunset shook hands with Kiwi, it showed they were doing Time Loop then Sunset and Pinkie Pie tried to face them but it did not work. Soon after Sunset and Pinkie arrived where they were and they started to fight, when the 4 girls went up on stage Sunset destroyed the magic object so Kiwi threw herself on the ground and started to cry so they started to make a great show. In Rarity's ending in "Lost and Pound" episode, Rarity barges in their festival's lounge area, where it is revealed that Princess Thunder Guts belongs to Supernova Zap of PostCrush. Su-Z is overjoyed to be reunited with her pet, and she thanks Rarity with a fashionable feather boa.

=== My Little Pony G5 ===
Name	Species	Gender	Body color	Hair or mane color	Eye color	Special, Episode and Film debut	Voiced by
Sprout Cloverleaf	Earth Pony	Male	Red	Yellow	Green	My Little Pony: A New Generation	Ken Jeong
Sprout Cloverleaf is the son of Phyllis Cloverleaf, the head of the Canterlogic company. Like all Earth ponies, he grew up believing the pegasi and unicorns to be feared. As an adult, he is the deputy of Maretime Bay. When Hitch Trailblazer, the sheriff, has to leave town to find and apprehend Sunny Starscout, he leaves Sprout in charge as temporary sheriff, but Sprout instead turns into a power-mad dictator who uses the Canterlogic factory to construct a war machine. Near the movie's end, Hitch returns with Sunny, now realizing the pegasi and unicorns can be friends after all, but Sprout commences an attack with his competed war machine, which the protagonists try to stop but ends up destroying Sunny's lighthouse home. Sunny convinces the earth ponies, pegasi, and unicorns to stop living in fear of one another, and Sprout isn't seen again until the Make Your Mark series, doing community service.
Opaline	Alicorn	Female	Purple	White and cyan	Blue	My Little Pony: Make Your Mark	Athena Karkanis
Opaline is an alicorn villain debuting in My Little Pony: Make Your Mark. Aided by a young unicorn named Misty, she spies on the protagonists and plans take all the magic in Equestria for herself.

== Bibliography ==
- Summer Hayes (May 1, 2008) The My Little Pony G1 Collector's Inventory: an unofficial full color illustrated collector's price guide to the first generation of MLP including all US ponies, playsets and accessories released before 1997 with a foreword by Dream Valley's Kim Shriner. Priced Nostalgia Press. ISBN 978-0-9786063-1-2
- Summer Hayes (2007) The My Little Pony G3 Collector's Inventory: an unofficial full color illustrated guide to the third generation of MLP including all ponies, playsets and accessories from 2003 to the present. Priced Nostalgia Press. ISBN 978-0-9786063-5-0
- Hillary DePiano (2005) The My Little Pony Collector's Inventory: A Complete Checklist of All US Ponies, Playsets and Accessories from 1981 to 1992. Priced Nostalgia Press. ISBN 1-4116-2165-4
- Summer Hayes (2009) The My Little Pony 2007–2008 Collector's Inventory. Priced Nostalgia Press. ISBN 978-0-9786063-6-7
- Debra L. Birge (2007) My Little Pony*r Around the World. Schiffer Publishing. ISBN 978-0-7643-1749-1
- Wood, Walton. "The Empirical Twilight: A Pony's Guide to Science & Anarchism" ImageTexT: Interdisciplinary Comics Studies. 6.1 (2011): n. pag. Dept of English, University of Florida. 18 December 2011. Web.
- Brandon T. Snider. (2013) My Little Pony: The Elements of Harmony: Friendship is Magic: The Official Guidebook. Little, Brown Books. ISBN 978-0-3162475-4-2
