= Gilda =

Gilda may refer to:

- Gilda (given name), including a list of people and fictional characters with the name
  - Gilda Radner (1946–1989), American comedian and actress
  - Gilda (Argentine singer) (1961–1996)
  - Gilda (Italian singer) (born 1950)
- Gilda (film), a 1946 film noir starring Rita Hayworth
- List of storms named Gilda
- Gilda's Italian Restaurant, Portland, Oregon
- Gilda, a type of pickled tapa typical of northern Spain
- Gilda, streamlined automobile design (1955) by Giovanni Savonuzzi

== See also ==
- Gildo (disambiguation)
