= Gildo (given name) =

Gildo is a masculine given name and nickname that is borne by:

== Given name ==
- Gildo (died 398), ancient Roman Berber general
- Gildo Bocci (1886–1964), Italian film actor
- Gildo Cunha do Nascimento (died 2019), Brazilian footballer known as Gildo
- Gildo Di Marco (born 1946) Italian actor
- Gildo Insfrán (born 1951), Argentine politician and governor of Formosa Province
- Gildo Kassa (born 1995), Ethiopian record producer, songwriter and singer
- Gildo Pastor (1910–1990), Monégasque businessman and property developer
- Gildo Pallanca Pastor (born 1967), Monegasque businessman, grandson of the above
- Gildo Rizzato (born 1948), Italian former footballer
- Gildo Rodrigues (1939–2009), Brazilian football manager
- Gildo Seisdedos Domínguez (born 1967), Spanish economist and lawyer
- Gildo Siorpaes (born 1938), Italian bobsledder
- Gildo Vilanculos (born 1995), Mozambican footballer

== Nickname ==
- Ermenegildo Gildo Arena (1921–2005), Italian water polo player and freestyle swimmer
- Hermenengildo Gildo Mahones (1929–2018), American jazz pianist
- Ermenegildo Zegna (fashion entrepreneur) (born 1955), Italian entrepreneur

== Stage name ==
- Guildo Horn stage name of Horst Heinz Köhler (born 1963) German schlager singer

== See also ==
- Gilda (given name)
