= My Little Pony: Equestria Girls – Rainbow Rocks =

2014 film by Jayson Thiessen and Ishi Rudell

- Theatrical release poster
- Directed by: Jayson Thiessen; Ishi Rudell
- Written by: Meghan McCarthy
- Based on: My Little Pony: Friendship Is Magic series developed for television by Lauren Faust
- Produced by: Devon Cody; Sarah Wall
- Starring: Tara Strong; Ashleigh Ball; Andrea Libman; Tabitha St. Germain; Cathy Weseluck; Rebecca Shoichet; Kazumi Evans; Marÿke Hendrikse; Diana Kaarina
- Edited by: Rachel Kenzie
- Music by: William Kevin Anderson (Orchestral Score); Daniel Ingram and Meghan McCarthy (Songs)
- Production companies: DHX Media; Hasbro Studios
- Distributed by: Screenvision (United States theatrical); Cineplex Entertainment (Canadian theatrical)
- Release date: September 27, 2014
- Running time: 70 minutes
- Countries: Canada; United States
- Language: English
- Box office: $347,511 (Finland, Mexico, United Arab Emirates, United Kingdom and Uruguay)

My Little Pony: Equestria Girls – Rainbow Rocks (or simply Rainbow Rocks) is a 2014 animated musical fantasy film directed by Jayson Thiessen and Ishi Rudell, written by Meghan McCarthy, and produced by DHX Media Vancouver for Hasbro Studios. The sequel to My Little Pony: Equestria Girls (2013), it is the second installment in Hasbro's Equestria Girls franchise, which serves as a spin-off to the 2010 relaunch of My Little Pony.

Like the first film, Rainbow Rocks re-envisions the main characters of the parent franchise, normally ponies, as teenage humanoid characters in a high school setting. Set between the fourth and fifth seasons of My Little Pony: Friendship Is Magic, the film's plot involves Twilight Sparkle returning to Canterlot High School in the parallel world to compete in a Battle of the Bands alongside the counterparts of her friends – including former school bully and former student of Princess Celestia, Sunset Shimmer – to save the school from a trio of sirens from Equestria.

My Little Pony: Equestria Girls – Rainbow Rocks premiered in select theaters across the United States and Canada on September 27, 2014, which was followed by broadcast on Discovery Family (a joint venture between Discovery, Inc. and Hasbro) on October 17, and a home media release by Shout! Factory on October 28. It received generally positive reviews from critics, who considered it "far superior" to the first film. The film was followed by two sequels, Friendship Games (2015) and Legend of Everfree (2016).

== Plot ==
Former Canterlot High School bully and student of Princess Celestia, Sunset Shimmer, who has reformed after being defeated by the magic of Twilight Sparkle's crown, (Note: As depicted in My Little Pony: Equestria Girls (2013)) is ostracised by most of the school despite her efforts to atone. Her only friends are the human counterparts of Rainbow Dash, Applejack, Pinkie Pie, Fluttershy and Rarity, who have formed a rock band called "the Rainbooms" to participate in the school's upcoming musical showcase. The five girls discover that the magic left over from Twilight's crown has given them the ability to grow pony-like ears, tails and wings when they play their instruments.

Hoping to make a fresh impression, Sunset gives a school tour to three new students – Adagio Dazzle, Aria Blaze, and Sonata Dusk – and informs them of the showcase, unaware that they possess magical powers. Calling themselves "the Dazzlings," the trio performs a song that turns the other students aggressive and competitive towards one another, convincing them to turn the showcase into a battle of the bands. Sunset and her friends are protected from the song by their magic, but fail to convince Principal Celestia and Vice Principal Luna of the danger. Sunset remembers a magical book kept by Princess Celestia, her mentor from Equestria, which she uses to send a message requesting Twilight's help.

Receiving Sunset's message, Twilight deduces that the Dazzlings are sirens from Equestria that feed on negative emotions to fuel their singing powers for their goal of world conquest. Twilight uses the book's magic to reactivate the portal, allowing her and Spike to return to the human world. Twilight and the girls attempt to lift the Sirens' spell, but it takes no effect. Concluding that they must perform a musical counter-spell, the girls enter the battle of the bands to give Twilight time to complete the spell. The Rainbooms face hostility and sabotage from the other bands throughout the competition, which raises tensions among themselves.

Desperate for time in the semi-final round against Trixie's band, Rainbow Dash performs an egotistical song to substitute the counter-spell and unknowingly nearly transforms. Sunset impulsively ruins her performance to keep her from exposing their plan to the Sirens, which angers the girls. The Sirens intervene to allow the Rainbooms' advancement to the final round anyway, which prompts a jealous Trixie to trap the Rainbooms beneath the stage to take their place. The girls enter a five-way argument (Rarity over Applejack not caring about her costume ideas for the band, Fluttershy over Rainbow Dash taking all the credit for the band and not playing any songs that she wrote, and Pinkie Pie because being in the band is not fun), allowing the Sirens to absorb their magic. Realizing that their constant fighting is interfering with the counter-spell, Sunset convinces the girls to resolve their differences, while Twilight reasons that playing together as friends will make the counter-spell work.

Spike rescues the girls with assistance from DJ Pon-3, whose headphones' music protects her from the Sirens' spell. DJ Pon-3 provides a sound system that the Rainbooms use to engage the Sirens in a musical battle after they had reached their peak in the movie with their signature "We will be adored" verse. The Dazzlings use the magic from the Rainbooms' negative energy to gain similar power, including an ear-tail combo, with featherless, transparent wings. The Rainbooms interrupt directly after the Sirens finished their verse, and proceed to transform into their "ponied-up" forms to counter the Dazzlings' spell. The Dazzlings then summon their astral projections and the bands engage in combat with music, and are overwhelmed by the Sirens. They get knocked down by the Dazzlings' power, before being joined by Sunset after Twilight had the microphone flung out of her hand, and with Sunset's help, they destroy the Sirens' pendants and the sources of their powers, leading to the Sirens being booed offstage. Afterward, Twilight and Spike return to Equestria, while Sunset uses Celestia's book to remain in contact with Twilight.

During the credits, Sunset is seen having now been accepted by the rest of the school and become the Rainbooms' newest member. In a post-credits scene, the human world's version of Twilight is shown investigating the strange magical activity around Canterlot High School, remarking that "something strange" is going on there.

== Cast ==
- Tara Strong as Princess Twilight Sparkle, a studious "alicorn" (winged unicorn) and one of the princesses of Equestria. She serves as the temporary lead vocalist of the Rainbooms, a band formed by the counterparts of her pony friends.
  - Strong also voices Twilight's counterpart in the alternate universe in a post-credits scene.
- Ashleigh Ball as:
  - Rainbow Dash, the lead guitarist and founder of the Rainbooms, and the lead vocalist.
  - Applejack, the Rainbooms' bassist.
    - Ball also voices Rainbow and Applejack's counterparts in Equestria as depicted in Friendship Is Magic.
- Andrea Libman as:
  - Pinkie Pie, the Rainbooms' drummer.
  - Fluttershy, who plays the tambourine on the Rainbooms.
    - Libman also voices Pinkie and Fluttershy's counterparts in Equestria as depicted in Friendship Is Magic.
      - Shannon Chan-Kent performs Pinkie's singing voice.
- Tabitha St. Germain as:
  - Rarity, the Rainbooms' keytarist.
    - Rarity's counterpart in Equestria, also voiced by St. Germain, appears in the film.
  - Vice Principal Luna, the vice-principal of Canterlot High and Principal Celestia's younger sister.
  - Photo Finish, a German-accented student.
- Cathy Weseluck as Spike, Twilight's dragon assistant who assumes the form of a dog in the parallel world.
  - Weseluck also voices Spike's alternate universe counterpart, an ordinary dog, in a post-credits scene.
- Rebecca Shoichet as Sunset Shimmer, a unicorn from Equestria and the former school bully at Canterlot High who became good at the end of the first film and has befriended the Rainbooms.
  - Shoichet also performs Twilight's singing voice.
- Kazumi Evans as:
  - Adagio Dazzle, the leader of the power-hungry sirens from Equestria and the lead vocalist of the Dazzlings.
    - Evans also performs Rarity's singing voice.
  - Octavia Melody, a student who plays the cello.
- Marÿke Hendrikse as Sonata Dusk, an airheaded siren and backing vocalist of the Dazzlings.
  - Madeline Merlo performs Sonata's singing voice.
- Diana Kaarina as Aria Blaze, a temperamental siren and backing vocalist of the Dazzlings.
  - Shylo Sharity performs Aria's singing voice.
- Vincent Tong as Flash Sentry, a student infatuated with Twilight who plays against her as the guitarist of a rival band, Flash Drive.
- Kathleen Barr as Trixie Lulamoon, a magician and guitarist of another rival band, Trixie and the Illusions.
- Nicole Oliver as Principal Celestia, the principal of Canterlot High and Vice Principal Luna's older sister.
- Michelle Creber as Apple Bloom, Applejack's younger sister.
- Ingrid Nilson as Maud Pie, Pinkie Pie's older sister.
- Peter New as Big McIntosh (Big Mac), Applejack and Apple Bloom's older brother.
- Lee Tockar as Snips, a student who is in a rap duo with Snails, under his stage name MC Snips.
- Richard Ian Cox as Snails, a student who is in a rap duo with Snips, under his stage name DJ Snazzy Snails.
- Brian Drummond as a delivery pony in Equestria who was delivering books to the Castle of Friendship from Canterlot.
- The counterpart of DJ Pon-3 appears prominently in the film, but does not speak.

== Production ==
On February 13, 2014, Meghan McCarthy wrote on Twitter that she had worked on the film during the summer of 2013. The film's opening credits were storyboarded by Tony Cliff. The storybook illustration depictions of the sirens in Equestria were done by Rebecca Dart. The illustrations shown during the ending credits were drawn by Katrina Hadley.

In the audio commentary included in home media releases, McCarthy commented that Equestria Girls was initially not intended to become an ongoing franchise and the thought of a sequel did not cross her mind. Additionally, Sunset did not become the main character until the second draft of the script. The commentary also points out that the midnight snack scene between Twilight and Sunset was added late into the film's production, and Rarity's line "we forgive you for your past...ahem...booboos" was ad-libbed by St. Germain and the freestyle rap by Snips and Snails' counterparts was genuine freestyling by Tockar and Ian Cox.

=== Music ===
On February 13, 2014, songwriter Daniel Ingram wrote on Twitter that there will be a total of 12 songs in the film, the greatest number of songs featured in a Friendship Is Magic episode or Equestria Girls film thus far; however, only 11 songs made it in the film.

Like in Equestria Girls, the songs were composed by Ingram with lyric writing shared between Ingram and screenwriter Meghan McCarthy; except "Rainbow Rocks" and "Shine Like Rainbows", which had lyrics by Ingram; "Bad Counter Spell" and "Under Our Spell" by McCarthy and "Shake Your Tail" having the first draft by the writer Amy Keating Rogers, in which Ingram later revised. Trevor Hoffman provided the vocal arrangements for the songs and musician Caleb Chan produced the songs as well as playing guitars and bass.

- "Rainbow Rocks" – The Rainbooms (voiceover)
- "Better Than Ever" – The Rainbooms
- "Battle" – The Dazzlings and students
- "Bad Counter Spell" – Twilight Sparkle
- "Shake Your Tail" – The Rainbooms
- "Under Our Spell" – The Dazzlings
- "Tricks Up My Sleeve" – Trixie and the Illusions
- "Awesome as I Wanna Be" – Rainbow Dash and the Rainbooms
- "Welcome to the Show" – The Rainbooms, Sunset Shimmer, the Dazzlings, and students
- "Rainbooms Battle" – Instrumental
- "End Credits Song: Shine Like Rainbows" – The Rainbooms

== Release ==
=== Marketing ===
On July 24, 2014, a film clip and a teaser trailer were released on Yahoo! TV. On September 10, 2014, through the Equestria Daily fan news blog, Shout! Factory revealed a 30-second trailer. Two days later on September 12, a 50-second trailer was released on YouTube. Six days later on September 18, a full theatrical trailer was released also via Yahoo! TV; the trailer was then uploaded to Hasbro's YouTube channel four days later on September 22. These trailers had no classification card from the MPAA, even for the United States screenings.

=== Theatrical ===
The film received a limited theatrical release on September 27, 2014, in the United States through Screenvision theaters and in Canada through Cineplex theaters. It also received a "Purple Carpet" premiere at the TCL Chinese Theatre in Hollywood, which was attended by the cast and crew as well as some celebrities such as Jamie Foxx, Modern Family actress Ariel Winter, and Academy Award nominee Quvenzhané Wallis. Like the first film, the screenings of Rainbow Rocks in the United States bore no classification from the MPAA (which is not mandatory), while the Canadian screenings had ratings from provincial film classification boards (usually G).

In the United Kingdom, the film was theatrically released on October 25 and 26, 2014. In Australia, the film was theatrically released on November 15, 2014.

=== Home media ===
The film was released on DVD and Blu-ray by Shout! Factory on October 28, 2014, in Region 1. Special features include a new featurette, the eight prelude animated shorts, a sing-along song, and an audio commentary on the film by Thiessen, Rudell, McCarthy, Hasbro Studios vice president of development Michael Vogel and Hasbro's executive director Brian Lenard. There were also three store exclusives for the United States release of the DVD: the Target edition included a bracelet, a USD $4 coupon for one My Little Pony toy, and the DVD of the first Equestria Girls film; the Walmart edition included a music CD, a digital copy of the film, and the same $4 coupon; the Kmart edition included a "backstage pass" and the coupon. The initial production run of the DVD contained an error that caused chapters 5 and 6 to play in reverse order when the film was viewed using the "Play" option on the main menu.

A Region 2 Rainbow Rocks DVD from distributor Primal Screen Entertainment was released on March 23, 2015, for various countries, including France, Germany, Italy, the Middle East region, the Netherlands and the United Kingdom.Alongside Equestria Girls and Friendship Games, this film was released in a box set on October 13, 2015 in Region 1.

=== Television ===
Rainbow Rocks made its United States television premiere on Discovery Family (a joint venture between Discovery, Inc. and Hasbro) on October 17, 2014. The film premiered on the Family Channel in Canada on November 8, 2014. In the United Kingdom, it premiered in Pop on December 24, 2014.

== Merchandise and other media ==
The film is a part of the music-themed Rainbow Rocks lineup, a second installment in the My Little Pony: Equestria Girls toy line and media franchise, which was first displayed at the 2014 American International Toy Fair. LB Kids published two novelizations of the film, all written by Perdita Finn. A Rainbow Rocks missile command-type mini-game was added to the Hasbro Arcade mobile app on April 8, 2014. An issue of IDW's Fiendship Is Magic features the sirens.

=== Animated shorts ===
==== Prelude ====
On February 13, 2014, the Entertainment Weekly website released the first trailer; about four months later, however, McCarthy confirmed on her Twitter post that the clips from that trailer "are separate shorts and not scenes in the movie." A series of eight animated shorts was released on Hasbro's YouTube channel in 2014 from March 27 to June 19. The shorts were created by the Friendship Is Magic crew to tie into the film and are considered "prequels" to the film's events, detailing how each of them discovered that they could awaken Equestrian magic within them by playing their respective instruments.

The first eight shorts made their television debut on Discovery Family on May 30, 2015.

No.	Title	Directed by	Written by	Original release date
1	"Music to My Ears"	Ishi Rudell	Cindy Morrow	March 27, 2014
DJ Pon-3 struts to her beat on her way to Canterlot High, only to have her headphones confiscated by Principal Celestia when she gets there.
2	"Guitar Centered"	Ishi Rudell	Amy Keating Rogers	April 4, 2014
Rainbow Dash and Trixie get into an argument over a double-neck electric guitar in a music store and face each other in a "shred-off". Though Rainbow Dash wins, she decides to keep the guitar that won her the shred-off and leaves Trixie with the double-neck guitar, at an unaffordable price, as her prize.
3	"Hamstocalypse Now"	Ishi Rudell	Josh Haber	April 11, 2014
Fluttershy and Rarity get into trouble when hamsters run loose while they try to clean their home at the animal shelter. Fluttershy manages to corral the hamsters by hypnotizing them with her tambourine music.
4	"Pinkie on the One"	Ishi Rudell	Josh Haber	April 25, 2014
Annoyed by Pinkie Pie's constant drumming antics, Rainbow Dash finds an outlet for Pinkie's energy by making her their band's drummer.
5	"Player Piano"	Ishi Rudell	Amy Keating Rogers	May 9, 2014
Rarity turns to the Diamond Dog boys for help moving her grand piano across campus in time for band practice with her friends. After she arrives late, she agrees to take up playing the more portable keytar instead.
6	"A Case for the Bass"	Ishi Rudell	Natasha Levinger	May 23, 2014
Applejack tries to buy back her bass guitar after Granny Smith (Tabitha St. Germain) accidentally sells it to the Flim Flam brothers (Samuel Vincent and Scott McNeil). When the brothers doubt her ownership and refuse to return it, Applejack proves herself by expertly playing the bass.
7	"Shake Your Tail!"	Ishi Rudell	Amy Keating Rogers	June 6, 2014
Twilight Sparkle and her friends try to come up with a theme for an upcoming party at Canterlot High.
8	"Perfect Day for Fun!"	Ishi Rudell	Daniel Ingram and Amy Keating Rogers	June 19, 2014
The six friends hang out together at Canterlot High's outdoor carnival.

==== Encore ====
With lyric collaboration between Thiessen, Vogel, Lenard, Katrina Hadley, and Daniel Ingram and songs composed by Ingram, Hasbro released three Rainbow Rocks music videos on March 31, 2015: "Friendship Through the Ages", "Life Is a Runway" and "My Past is Not Today"; but were reuploaded two days later on April 2, 2015. These shorts are separate initiatives that lead up to the third Equestria Girls film installment, Friendship Games. On April 6, 2015, Ingram replied in a comment on Facebook that these will likely be on the next Equestria Girls album in late 2015. On September 17, 2015, the encore shorts were released as the first three audio tracks on the My Little Pony Equestria Girls: The Friendship Games soundtrack.

No.	Title	Directed by	Written by	Original release date
1	"My Past Is Not Today"	Ishi Rudell	Katrina Hadley, Daniel Ingram, Brian Lenard, Jayson Thiessen and Michael Vogel	April 2, 2015
Sunset Shimmer sings about leaving her past mistakes behind her.
2	"Friendship Through the Ages"	Ishi Rudell	Katrina Hadley, Daniel Ingram, Brian Lenard, Jayson Thiessen and Michael Vogel	April 2, 2015
The Rainbooms sing about their everlasting friendship to Sunset Shimmer.
3	"Life Is a Runway"	Ishi Rudell	Katrina Hadley, Daniel Ingram, Brian Lenard, Jayson Thiessen and Michael Vogel	April 2, 2015
Rarity sings about her fashion philosophy.

=== Soundtrack ===
The film's soundtrack was released on September 10, 2014, via the iTunes Store. Announced on Ingram's Twitter eight days later on September 18 (chart of September 27), the soundtrack placed #15 on the Kid Albums Billboard chart; two weeks later on October 2 (chart of October 11, 2014), the soundtrack placed #12; a week later on October 18, it placed #10.

No.	Title	Writer(s)	Performer(s)	Length
1.	"Rainbow Rocks"	Daniel Ingram	Rebecca Shoichet, Ashleigh Ball, Shannon Chan-Kent, Andrea Libman, Kazumi Evans	1:40
2.	"Better Than Ever"	Ingram and Meghan McCarthy	Ball, Chan-Kent, Libman, Evans	1:35
3.	"Under Our Spell"	Ingram and McCarthy	Evans, Madeline Merlo, Shylo Sharity	1:51
4.	"Tricks Up My Sleeve"	Ingram and McCarthy	Kathleen Barr, Kaylee Johnston	2:06
5.	"Shake Your Tail"	Amy Keating Rogers and Ingram	Shoichet, Ball, Evans, Libman, Chan-Kent	1:59
6.	"Welcome to the Show"	Ingram and McCarthy	Evans, Merlo, Sharity, Shoichet, Ball, Libman, Chan-Kent, chorus	4:37
7.	"Awesome as I Wanna Be"	Ingram and McCarthy	Ball, Shoichet, Libman, Chan-Kent, Evans	1:16
8.	"Let's Have a Battle (of the Bands)"	Ingram and McCarthy	Evans, Merlo, Sharity	2:52
9.	"Shine Like Rainbows"	Ingram	Ball, Chan-Kent, Libman, Evans, Shoichet, chorus	2:35
10.	"Music to My Ears (Bonus Track)"	Ingram		1:45
Total length:				22:16

== Reception ==
=== Box office ===
In Hasbro's Q3 2014 Earnings Report, it was revealed that the box office returns from this film exceeded that of the first film in the first weekend by 37%. On a per-theater basis, sales for tickets grew by 19% in the first three weeks of its limited theatrical run. The film grossed $360,736 in its limited time in theaters in the United Kingdom, Finland, Mexico, the United Arab Emirates and Uruguay.

=== Television viewership ===
When the main feature premiered on Discovery Family on October 17, 2014, it was viewed by approximately 610,000 viewers.

When the first eight Rainbow Rocks shorts made their television debut on Discovery Family on May 30, 2015, they were viewed by approximately 299,000 viewers.

=== Critical response ===
My Little Pony: Equestria Girls – Rainbow Rocks was well received by critics and fans. Sherilyn Connelly for The Village Voice called Rainbow Rocks "far superior" to the first Equestria Girls film and that while "the picture is continuity-heavy and not particularly accessible to newcomers", that the film was "up there with the show at its most thoughtful". Sheri Linden of The Hollywood Reporter complimented the film, saying "Though it's strictly for the faithful, the tween-friendly mix of cute and earnest has a forthright sharpness and is never cloying." Shane O'Hare of Geekscape gave the Blu-ray of the film a score of 4 out of 5, praising the soundtrack stating "The show's composer, Daniel Ingram,...killed it. 10 all new original recordings from Daniel really stole the show." Ed Liu of Toon Zone (now Anime Superhero), who gave the first film a mixed review, also found this film to be better. He wrote the film "is almost as sweet and charming as the best episodes of the series, finding new and interesting ways to expand on the show's themes of friendship."

"Gerry O", 12-year-old film critic for The Huffington Post's Kids First! called the film "a combination of adventure with a crème of comedy and a sprinkle of excitement all rapped [sic] up in a friendship sandwich."

In 2017, IGN named the film among the "Best Kids Movies Streaming on Netflix".
