= Gilda Oliveros =

American politician (born 1949)

Gilda Oliveros (born August 14, 1949) is a former American politician of the Republican Party. She was the first Cuban-born woman mayor in the United States.

The daughter of Juan Jose Cabrera and Angela Maria Ginart, she was born Gilda Cabrera in San Antonio de Las Vegas. The family left Cuba in 1966 for Florida, where her father became a boat builder and her mother a factory worker. She graduated from Miami Central High School in 1969 and married Aldo Oliveros soon afterwards. The couple had two daughters. She earned a certificate as a medical assistant from Miami Dade College in 1973. In 1987, she was elected to city council for Hialeah Gardens and was named city finance director. In 1989, she was elected mayor.

She has received a number of awards from her community, including Woman of the Year. After she became mayor, she was invited to the White House by then-president George H. W. Bush.

In 2000, Oliveros was convicted of asking two city employees to murder her second ex-husband Angel Ramos. Oliveros was also convicted of two counts of voter fraud, one count of false swearing to an oath and insurance fraud. Her ex-husband, allegedly the intended victim, testified in Oliveros' favor. In 2003, the Third District Court of Appeal overturned the murder for hire conviction.

Oliveros was expelled from her position as mayor by governor Jeb Bush in 2000.
