= Gilda Ochoa =

American sociologist

- Title: Professor of Chicana/o Latina/o Studies

Academic background
- Education: University of California, Los Angeles
- Thesis: Animosity and Unity: Mexican-American and Mexican Immigrant Relations in La Puente, California (1997)

Academic work
- Discipline: Sociology
- Institutions: Pomona College
- Main interests: Latino studies, education
- Notable works: Academic Profiling: Latinos, Asian Americans, and the Achievement Gap
- Website: www.pomona.edu/directory/people/gilda-l-ochoa

Gilda Laura Ochoa is an American sociologist and professor. She is Professor of Chicana/o-Latina/o studies at Pomona College in the United States, and the author of Academic Profiling: Latinos, Asian Americans, and the Achievement Gap.

== Career ==
Ochoa earned her Ph.D. in sociology from the University of California, Los Angeles in 1997 with a dissertation on relations between Mexican Americans and Mexican immigrants. Ochoa has been Professor of Chicana/o-Latina/o studies at Pomona College since 1997. Her teaching and research involved college students in community-based research on systemic racism, and community-driven responses to in Los Angeles.

== Writing ==
Ochoa is the author of the book Academic Profiling: Latinos, Asian Americans, and the Achievement Gap, published in 2013, and named by HuffPost contributor Qassan Castro as one of "35 books all educators of African American and Latino students must read'. The book examines the root causes behind the "achievement gap" between Latino and Asian American students in California, using ethnographic research and interviews at a Southern California high school. In a review for the American Journal of Sociology, James Ainsworth praised Academic Profiling for moving beyond conventional comparison of the achievement gap between black and white students, but also noted that "there is not much that was theoretically new in this book". Writing in Latino Studies, Cecelia Suarez described the book as "powerful and purposeful in both argument and research" and "an affirmation that qualitative research is a powerful and valid source of knowledge". In 2014, the book won an Association for Asian American Studies Award, the American Sociological Association's Oliver Cromwell Cox Book Award for Anti-Racist Scholarship, and the Eduardo Bonilla-Silva Outstanding Book award from the Society for the Study of Social Problems.

Ochoa has authored two other books, Learning from Latino Teachers and Becoming Neighbors in a Mexican-American Community: Power, Conflict, and Solidarity. She is currently studying sexuality and Latinas' race-gendered experiences in schools.

== Selected works ==
- Ochoa, Gilda L. (2004). Becoming Neighbors in a Mexican American Community: Power, Conflict, and Solidarity. University of Texas Press. ISBN 9780292702103.
- Ochoa, Enrique; Ochoa, Gilda L., eds. (2005). Latino Los Angeles: Transformation, Communities, and Activism. University of Arizona Press. ISBN 9780816524686.
- Ochoa, Gilda L. (2007). Learning from Latino Teachers. Jossey-Bass. ISBN 9780787987770.
- Ochoa, Gilda L. (2013). Academic Profiling: Latinos, Asian Americans, and the Achievement Gap. University of Minnesota Press. ISBN 9781452940120.
