= Gilda Ruta =

Italian pianist, music educator and composer

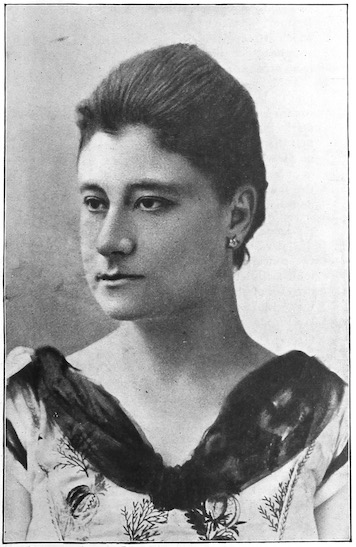
Image of Gilda Ruta from Freund's Musical Weekly

Gilda Ruta (13 October 1853 – 26 October 1932) was an Italian pianist, music educator and composer.

== Biography ==
Countess Gilda Ruta Cagnazzi was born in Naples, the daughter of composer Michele Ruta and English singer Emilia Sutton.

She studied music with her father and with the opera composer Saverio Mercadante and became a noted pianist. She played before Queen Margherita of Italy at the Constanzi Theater in Rome (now Teatro dell'Opera di Roma) and won a gold medal at the International Exposition in Florence. After being widowed at age of 27 with two children, she began composing. She moved to New York City, taught private piano lessons in Greenwich Village, and died of a cerebral hemorrhage in Manhattan at age 79.

== Works ==
Ruta produced more than 125 works for voice and piano, and also composed for opera.

Selected works include:

- Scherzo for pianoforte
- Voglio guarire, melodia romantica
- Tempo di Gavotta e Musette for pianoforte
- Canto melanconico for contralto and basso
- La Gavotta per pianoforte
- Partirai!! canto for mezzo-sop and baritono
- Alle stelle melodia romantica
- Canzone marinaresca for soprano
- Allegro appassionato for pianoforte
- Per te! canto
- Dolci memorie! melodia
- Dammi un' ora d'amor! melodia romantica
- The Fire-Worshippers opera
- Cuore su Cuore valzer
- Siciliana for pianoforte
