= Gildo Seisdedos Domínguez =

Spanish economist and lawyer

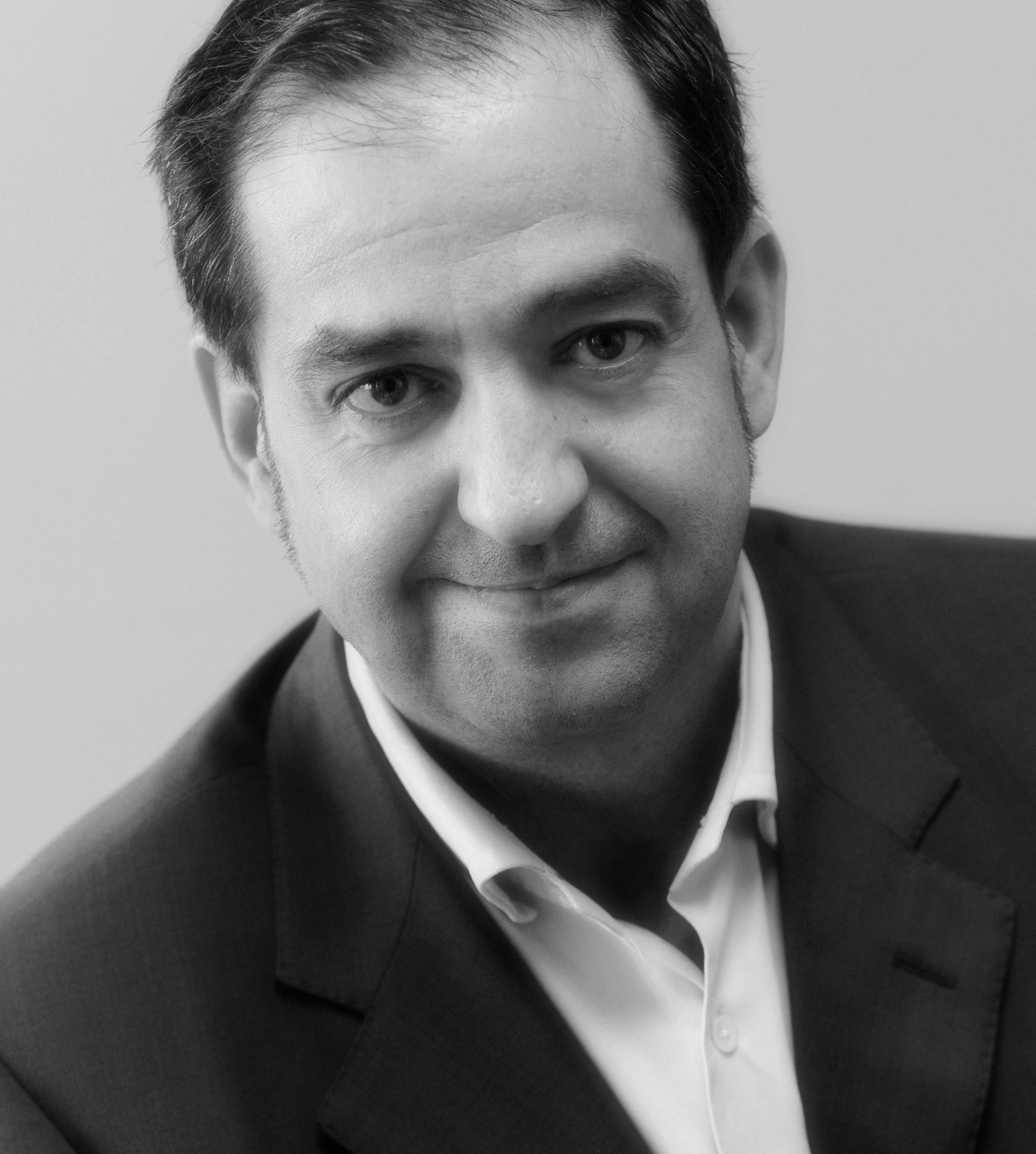
- Gildo Seisdedos (2013)
- Born: 1967 (age 57–58)
- Occupation(s): Economist, lawyer

Gildo Seisdedos (born 1967) is a Spanish economist and lawyer who specializes in city marketing and smart cities. He is a professor at the IE Business School, lecturer and editor in media and international publications. He has published several books, highlighting Cómo gestionar las ciudades del siglo XXI (Managing 21st-century cities), published in Spanish by Prentice Hall.

== Biography ==
As director of the Forum for Urban Management, Seisdedos actively collaborated in Madrid bid for the 2016 Summer Olympics. Segovia, Cuenca, Zaragoza, Nuevo Hamburgo (Brasil), Barcelona, Burgos, Bogotá, Cuenca (Ecuador), Almería, Irún, Viena and Omán, where he participated in the planning project of the Sultanate.

His book Cómo gestionar las ciudades del siglo XXI (Managing 21st-century cities) (2007) published in Spanish, introduced a new methodology, the UDS or urban development strategy.

Seisdedos is a member of the editorial board of the Journal of Town and City Management and Sustainable City magazine, where he is a regular contributor. He is a regular collaborator at Design Convergence Urbanism, Member of the International Association of Planners (ISOCARP) with consultative status at UNESCO and belongs to the Spanish area of the Habitat Committee.

== Publications ==
- SEISDEDOS, G. Cómo gestionar las ciudades del siglo XXI. Introducción de A. Ruiz Gallardón. Madrid: Prentice Hall (Financial Times), 2007. 204 p. ISBN 978-8483223567.
- _____, LOPEZ DE URALDE, I., MIRABET, V., Diccionario abreviado de términos de branding. Barcelona: Coleman, 2009. 180 p. ISBN 978-84-613-6037-6.
- _____, y MATEO, C. Different Branding Strategies from the use of the Territory of Origin by Commercial Brands: the Brand-Territory Matrix. Journal of Town & City Management, 2010, Vol.1(2): 175 - 186. bestplaceinstytut.org
- _____, COCA-STEFANIAK, A., et al. International trends in city management - views from around the editorial board. Journal of Town & City Management, 2010, Vol.1(1): 8 - 30.
- SEISDEDOS, G. & VAGGIONE, P. Sex and the city: city branding in Spanish cities. In GO, F. M. & GROVES, R. (ed.) International Place Branding Yearbook 2012: managing smart growth and sustainability. Palgrave Macmillan, 2012, p .81-92. ISBN 9780230279520
- _____, & MATEO, C. From Madrid Global to global Madrid, In ASHWORTH, G. y KAVARATZIS, M. (Eds.). Towards effective place brand management. Branding European cities and regions. London: Edward Elgar, 2010, p.: 69–88. ISBN 978 1 84844 242 9 e-elgar.com
