= Derpy Hooves =

Fictional background character from My Little Pony

- My Little Pony character
- Derpy Hooves as she appears in "Rainbow Falls"
- First appearance: "Friendship Is Magic – Part 1" (2010)
- Created by: Lauren Faust
- Based on: Background pony from the My Little Pony toyline's fourth incarnation
- Voiced by: Tabitha St. Germain

In-universe information
- Nicknames: Muffins; Ditzy Doo
- Species: Pegasus
- Occupation: Mail carrier
- Affiliation: Ponyville Postal Service, Ponyville Weather Team

Derpy Hooves (officially called Muffins; also known as Ditzy Doo) is a fictional character who appears in the fourth incarnation of Hasbro's My Little Pony toyline and media franchise, beginning with My Little Pony: Friendship Is Magic (2010–2019). She is voiced by Tabitha St. Germain.

Derpy Hooves is depicted as a clumsy but well-meaning anthropomorphic pegasus with crossed eyes who works as Ponyville's mail carrier and occasionally assists the weather team. Unlike the main characters of Friendship Is Magic, Derpy started out as a background character whose uniquely cross-eyed appearance was initially an animation error in the series premiere of Friendship Is Magic that fans on 4chan's comics and cartoons board, /co/, noticed and embraced. She was dubbed "Derpy Hooves" and became a favorite of fans, who collectively developed her personality and backstory through works of fan fiction. Analysts have described Derpy Hooves as the mascot of the brony fandom, and the show's crew began placing her in the backgrounds of episodes as an Easter egg.

The character gained official show recognition when she received her first speaking role in "The Last Roundup", where Rainbow Dash addresses her with the name "Derpy". However, this decision proved controversial as critics claimed that her portrayal perpetuated ableist stereotypes due to her name, voice, and mannerisms—a controversy colloquially called "Derpygate" by the brony fandom. In response to the backlash, Hasbro modified the episode by changing her voice, straightening her eyes, and removing her name from the dialogue, which generated further controversy within the brony fandom.

Despite the controversy, Derpy continued to appear throughout the series and received official merchandise recognition. Her evolution from background character to fan favorite has been critically analyzed by academics as a symbol of the brony fandom's influence on the show itself, and is cited as a rare example of a work's participatory culture affecting the work itself, as well as a symbol of social acceptance among male fans of the show who may feel marginalized by mainstream masculine culture.

== Appearances ==
=== Fourth My Little Pony incarnation (2010–2021) ===
==== My Little Pony: Friendship Is Magic ====
Derpy Hooves is commonly associated with muffins.

Derpy Hooves first appears in the series premiere as a background pegasus pony with her eyes accidentally rendered cross-eyed due to an animation error. Throughout the first season, Derpy appears primarily as a background character, mostly relegated to crowd scenes and brief cameos. In "Applebuck Season", she is seen excitedly mouthing "Muffins!", which became the origin of her association with muffins. During "Winter Wrap Up", she is mentioned by name as "Ditzy Doo"—described as a "featherbrained" pegasus who flew in the wrong direction while trying to fetch migrating birds back to Ponyville. Her eyes were first intentionally animated as crossed for "Feeling Pinkie Keen", where she accidentally drops objects on Twilight Sparkle in a slapstick sequence.

Beginning in the second season, Derpy was written into scripts rather than placed as an arbitrary background pony, and she became a Where's Waldo-type Easter egg for fans. She received her first speaking role in "The Last Roundup", where Rainbow Dash addresses her by name. In the scene, she excitedly and clumsily bounces on a storm cloud, causing damage to Ponyville's town hall, while jubilantly exclaiming "I just don't know what went wrong!" This episode was later altered, removing Rainbow Dash saying Derpy's name, and modifying Derpy's voice following controversy over her portrayal, which critics deemed ableist (see History § Controversy over the character's portrayal).

In later seasons, Derpy's appearances become more sporadic. She has her second major speaking role in the series' 100th episode, "Slice of Life", where she shares scenes with Dr. Whooves and accidentally messes up wedding invitations. The credits officially name her as "Muffins" in this episode.

==== My Little Pony: The Movie ====
Derpy Hooves makes a minor appearance during the Storm King's invasion of Canterlot. When Tempest Shadow attempts to turn Twilight Sparkle into an obsidian statue, Derpy accidentally gets caught in the crossfire and is turned to stone instead, inadvertently saving Twilight. After the defeat of the Storm King at the film's conclusion, Derpy is restored to normal along with the other petrified ponies when the princesses' magic is released from the Storm King's staff.

==== Equestria Girls alternate version ====
Derpy's human world counterpart appears as a recurring student at Canterlot High School. Her most notable appearances include a scene during the credits of the first film, My Little Pony: Equestria Girls, in which she dances with a muffin, and a brief speaking role in the film My Little Pony: Equestria Girls – Legend of Everfree, in which she is named in the credits as "Muffins".

== History ==
=== Origins and development ===
Derpy's first appearance in the show's series premiere

Derpy Hooves originated as an unnamed gray pegasus in the series premiere of My Little Pony: Friendship Is Magic in 2010, where a background pegasus pony was accidentally rendered with crossed eyes (strabismus). This distinctive trait was first noticed by fans on 4chan's comics and cartoons board (also known as /co/) on October 25, 2010, when a user named Dr. Foreigner directed others to "Go to 17:18 into the first episode and look at the ponies in the background." In the same thread, Dr. Foreigner declared: "And so the legend of Derpy Hooves was born", cementing the character's fan-given name. The name was derived from the Internet slang term derp, used to refer to something stupid or a stupid facial expression. In a March 2011 post on Ponychan, supervising director Jayson Thiessen explained that the eyes had been misaligned by "some cheeky animator," and Thiessen kept it in both because he found it funny and because Hasbro did not notice it.

Fans collectively developed Derpy's identity and backstory through participatory culture. As the character grew in popularity and became an Internet meme, the brony fandom collectively fleshed out her personality and characteristics. Her association with muffins originated from her appearance in "Applebuck Season", where she and an aquamarine-colored pony both mouth the word "Muffin!" in excitement. Her characterization as a mail carrier was established through early fan fiction. My Little Time Lord by Victorian R. Hellsly, published on FanFiction.net on January 30, 2011, was one of the earliest fan-made stories to pair her with another background character dubbed "Dr. Whooves", a character the fandom collectively decided was a ponification of the Tenth Doctor.

Derpy's misaligned eyes returned in the episode "Feeling Pinkie Keen", which was broadcast on February 11, 2011. In the episode, Derpy interacted with the plot for the first time by dropping increasingly heavy objects on Twilight's head in a slapstick sequence. Thiessen confirmed that her crossed eyes in this episode were a direct result of the fan reaction to the original background gag. As part of a charity auction for Japanese earthquake and tsunami relief in March 2011, series creator Lauren Faust offered an original drawing of the character, noting it was "the first time [she had] ever drawn this character." The illustration sold for $2,151 on eBay.

Faust's sketch of Derpy, sold and auctioned off on eBay for the 2011 Japan earthquake and tsunami relief efforts.

Voiced by Tabitha St. Germain, Derpy received her first speaking role in "The Last Roundup", which aired on January 21, 2012. Writer Amy Keating Rogers changed the character's intended name, Ditzy, to Derpy as a gesture of appreciation towards the show's adult fanbase. At the time, Rogers was unaware of any negative connotation of the word derpy.

=== Controversy over the character's portrayal ===
Soon after the airing of "The Last Roundup", criticism began to emerge regarding the character's portrayal in the episode. On January 22, 2012, the day after the episode aired, Jenna Pitman initiated a petition on Change.org titled "Make Amends for Hurtful Ableist Stereotype in My Little Pony"; she described the episode as promoting "a very hurtful, pro-bullying message" and compared the character's voice to "that slow, loopy and lispy drawl we have all heard others use as an insult". The petition garnered 136 signatures. In response, several petitions in support of Derpy were created, with Andrew Holt's "Hasbro Studios/The Hub: Do not change Derpy's name" ultimately garnering 44,395 signatures. Rogers said she received around 200 messages thanking her for the episode and 10 calling her ableist. After researching the word derpy further, she learned it was also used to mean retarded, which she said upset her as the mother of a disabled child and a disability rights advocate.

Hasbro and The Hub considered four options: to take no action, to remove Rainbow Dash's use of the name "Derpy" but retain Derpy's voice, to remove the name and modify the voice, or to change the name in a future episode. The episode was removed from iTunes on January 30, 2012. On February 24, 2012, a modified version was released with the character's voice re-recorded in a higher pitch, her eyes straightened, and Rainbow Dash no longer addressing her by name. The Equestria Daily post about these changes received 2,254 comments. The change was a major source of backlash within the brony fandom, and the incident was subsequently dubbed "Derpygate". In her 2017 history of the brony fandom, Sherilyn Connelly, working from the pro-Derpy petition's signature count, suggested that bronies were likely far outnumbered by the young girls who made up the show's target audience, and that the fans upset by the changes were a vocal minority rather than a majority of My Little Pony fans. According to Connelly, community artist Yamino received death threats after criticizing the character's portrayal.

Despite the controversy, Hasbro selected Derpy as the 2012 San Diego Comic-Con Special Edition Pony—making her the first Generation 4 character to receive this honor—and was also sold at the My Little Pony Fair in 2012. The toy was packaged without a name but featured muffin illustrations. In official merchandise and credits, the character has been consistently referred to as "Muffins" rather than "Derpy", including in Build-a-Bear products and other licensed items.

Subsequently, Derpy appeared only rarely until the season four episode "Rainbow Falls". According to supervising director Jim Miller, the production team had deliberately kept her out of the backgrounds of earlier episodes so that her return would come as a surprise. The special 100th episode "Slice of Life," which gave expanded roles to six of the show's most popular background characters, officially paired Derpy with Dr. Whooves. According to writer M.A. Larson, the episode originally planned to focus on Twilight Sparkle, but was reconceived to celebrate the background characters and the fan community.

== Reception and analysis ==
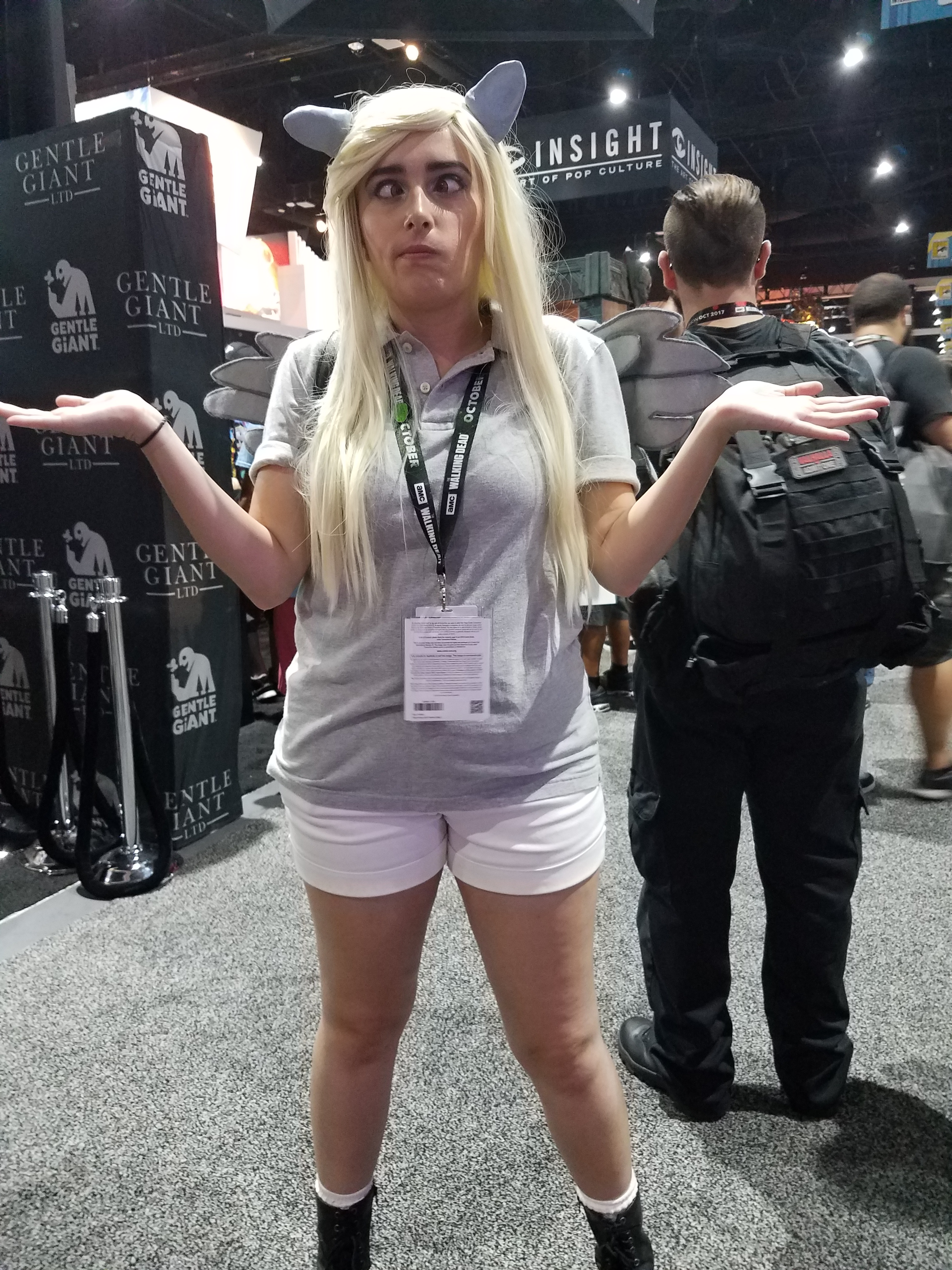
A cosplayer in Derpy Hooves costume

Within the brony fandom, Derpy Hooves has become one of the most beloved and celebrated background characters of My Little Pony: Friendship Is Magic. Fan works featuring Derpy expanded well beyond simple discussions, inspiring fan fiction and fan art. While Hasbro's own My Little Pony merchandise remained aimed at girls aged three to six, some steps were taken to acknowledge the franchise's adult fans. Funko, which began producing My Little Pony vinyl figures in 2014, including one of Derpy, explicitly addressed bronies when announcing the line and released some figures as exclusives for retailers such as Hot Topic. In 2012, WeLoveFine released a Ditzy Doo hoodie emblazoned with her crossed eyes, and in 2013, Hot Topic released a Derpy Hooves mini messenger bag. Cailyn Szelinski, writing in Comic Book Resources, ranked Derpy Hooves as the character with the fourth-cutest name in Friendship Is Magic.

In a February 2021 article, Meghan Walbert of Lifehacker wrote that children were using derpy as slang meaning "silly", "goofy", or "stupid", and raised concerns about the term's potentially offensive connotations. Walbert reiterated that the word derp was "an explicit word used to mock the disabled" and characterized it as "this generation's equivalent of 'retarded.'" Walbert wrote that while children may not intend to be ableist when using the term, parents should discuss why it could be offensive to people with disabilities.

Journalists and academics have described Derpy Hooves as the mascot of the brony community. The brony fandom has been recognized for effectively bringing Derpy Hooves to life through collective creativity as an example of participatory culture. The creators of the show have since recognized Derpy as the fandom's mascot and included her in Easter eggs throughout the show. The showrunners' choice to create a tribute to the fandom in the form of an episode, which features Derpy as a main character, has been described by Isabelle Licari-Guillaume in Transatlantica as a "radical" decision.

The incorporation of Derpy into the official show has been analyzed as a symbol of acceptance for bronies. Some scholars have suggested that Derpy's status as an outsider resonates with adult male fans who may feel marginalized by mainstream masculine culture. According to Ewan Kirkland, Derpy's evolution and rise in prominence among the fandom was an indication of how the brony fandom influenced the show itself, creating a feedback loop between the fans and the showrunners.

In his 2013 article The Ballad of Derpy Hooves, professor of media studies at the University of Colorado Colorado Springs Christopher Bell argued:

"Fans have certainly influenced the production of popular culture. However, in the annals of fan-creation history, there is little indication that fan producers have ever incorporated fan work into a canonical property the size and fiscal scope of My Little Pony... MLP:FIM stands alone in this new frontier of fan-producer interaction."

== See also ==
- Background Six – Popular background characters from My Little Pony
- List of My Little Pony: Friendship Is Magic characters
