= My Little Pony: Equestria Girls (film) =

2013 animated film

- Theatrical release poster
- Directed by: Jayson Thiessen
- Written by: Meghan McCarthy
- Based on: My Little Pony: Friendship Is Magic series developed for television by Lauren Faust
- Produced by: Sarah Wall; Devon Cody
- Starring: Tara Strong; Ashleigh Ball; Andrea Libman; Tabitha St. Germain; Cathy Weseluck; Rebecca Shoichet
- Edited by: Mark Kuehnel
- Music by: William Kevin Anderson
- Production companies: DHX Media; Hasbro Studios
- Distributed by: Screenvision (United States theatrical); Cineplex Entertainment (Canadian theatrical)
- Release dates: June 15, 2013 (Los Angeles Film Festival); June 16, 2013 (United States and Canada)
- Running time: 73 minutes
- Countries: Canada; United States
- Language: English
- Box office: $488,232 (Chile, Colombia, Peru, Uruguay and United Kingdom)

My Little Pony: Equestria Girls (Note: Also known simply as Equestria Girls, abbreviated as EQG, and subtitled Through the Mirror in the official novelization.) is a 2013 animated musical fantasy film directed by Jayson Thiessen, written by Meghan McCarthy, and produced by DHX Media Vancouver for Hasbro Studios in the United States. It is the first installment in Hasbro's Equestria Girls franchise, which serves as an anthropomorphic spin-off to the 2010 relaunch of My Little Pony. The film and franchise's introduction also commemorates the 30th anniversary of the original My Little Pony toy line.

Equestria Girls re-envisions the main characters of its parent franchise, normally ponies, as teenage humanoid characters in a high school setting. Set between the third and fourth seasons of the My Little Pony: Friendship Is Magic television series, the plot involves Twilight Sparkle pursuing her stolen crown into an alternate world, where she transforms into a humanoid teenage girl. While learning how to behave locally, Twilight encounters the parallel universe counterparts of her pony friends, who join her in the search for her crown.

My Little Pony: Equestria Girls premiered at the Los Angeles Film Festival on June 15, 2013, and entered limited release in the United States and Canada on June 16, followed by a home media release on August 6. The film received mixed reviews, with most criticism directed at the character design, writing, plot, and characterization. It was followed by three sequels, Rainbow Rocks (2014), Friendship Games (2015) and Legend of Everfree (2016) – all of which were more positively received.

== Plot ==
Twilight Sparkle and her best friends visit the Crystal Empire for her first royal summit following her coronation as a princess of Equestria. Sunset Shimmer, a rogue former student of Princess Celestia, emerges from a mirror portal and steals Twilight's crown, which contains the Element of Magic. After a chase through the castle, Sunset goes through the portal with Twilight's crown. The other princesses explain that the portal leads to an alternate world; as the other Elements of Harmony are unusable without the crown, Twilight is tasked with retrieving it from the other world before the portal closes for 30 moons. Despite Celestia's insistence that Twilight must travel alone, Spike follows her into the portal.

Twilight and Spike emerge in the other world in the forms of a humanoid teenager and a dog, respectively. Twilight investigates the nearby Canterlot High School and encounters its students and staff, several of whom resemble the ponies in Equestria. Masquerading as a transfer student, Twilight defends the counterpart of her friend Fluttershy from being bullied by Sunset. Twilight learns that Fluttershy has delivered the crown to Principal Celestia, mistaking it for a prop meant for the elected "princess" of the Fall Formal. Determining that no one would believe her claims of being a pony from another world, Twilight receives Celestia's permission to run for Fall Formal Princess against Sunset to recover the crown.

While continuing to explore school life, Twilight discovers that the counterparts of Fluttershy and her other friends from Ponyville (Pinkie Pie, Applejack, Rarity and Rainbow Dash) – have separated of hostility. Sunset sends her cohorts Snips and Snails to record a humiliating video of Twilight behaving like a pony, which is posted online and viewed by the entire school. The counterparts of Twilight's friends come to her aid, only to argue among themselves, revealing the cause of their falling out to be a series of treacherous text messages and emails they supposedly sent each other. Through a theory of Twilight's, however, the five girls realize that Sunset sent these messages to deceive them. They then reconcile and help Twilight perform a public dance routine for her campaign, which improves her image.

In another attempt to undermine Twilight, Sunset has the formal decorations in the school gym wrecked and uses edited photographs to frame Twilight. Although Sunset's ex-boyfriend Flash Sentry proves Twilight's innocence, the formal is postponed to the night after the portal to Equestria closes. Twilight and Spike reveal their true identities to the other girls, convincing them of the situation's urgency. Under Twilight's direction, they rally the other students and successfully repair the damage in time for its original schedule, earning Twilight the school's support.

On the night of the formal, Twilight wins the election and the crown, but Sunset steals it back in a scuffle after kidnapping Spike and threatening to destroy the portal to Equestria. Upon donning the crown, Sunset transforms into a demon and hypnotizes the other students, revealing her true intent to conquer Equestria with the students as her army. When Sunset attacks Twilight and her friends, their friendship activates the crown's magic, giving them pony-like ears, wings, and tails. The six girls use magic to revert Sunset and their schoolmates to normal, and Sunset, humbled by the power of the girls' friendship, tearfully apologizes for her actions. After celebrating at the formal and placing Sunset under her friends' care, Twilight and Spike return to Equestria with the crown as the portal closes, reuniting with their pony friends.

== Cast ==
- Tara Strong as Princess Twilight Sparkle
- Ashleigh Ball as Applejack and Rainbow Dash
- Andrea Libman as Pinkie Pie and Fluttershy
- Tabitha St. Germain as Rarity and Vice Principal Luna / Princess Luna
- Cathy Weseluck as Spike
- Rebecca Shoichet as Sunset Shimmer
- Lee Tockar as Snips
- Richard Ian Cox as Snails
- Kathleen Barr as Trixie Lulamoon (uncredited)
- Nicole Oliver as Principal Celestia / Princess Celestia and Cheerilee
- Vincent Tong as Flash Sentry
- Britt McKillip as Princess Cadance

=== Singers ===
- Rebecca Shoichet as Princess Twilight Sparkle
- Shannon Chan-Kent as Pinkie Pie
- Kazumi Evans as Rarity

== Production ==
To maintain continuity, Hasbro used the same writing staff as the Friendship Is Magic television series, including then-current story editor Meghan McCarthy, who considered the story to be "an extension of our mythology". McCarthy stated that with the Equestria Girls setting, "we might explore different aspects of relationships that in the pony world don't quite work the same as they do when you set it in a high school setting", thus making the work more appealing to older girls that are in high or junior high school.

In writing the film's script, McCarthy went back to the self-titled two-part pilot episode of Friendship Is Magic, where Twilight is sent to Ponyville for the first time and forced to meet new friends. She wanted to do the same with the film, in this case putting Twilight into a new world where she would again be forced to make new friends and succeed in her quest.

=== Music ===
Daniel Ingram stated in a Facebook post that he wrote six songs for the film in a more modern pop/girl group style that would fit the high school/urban setting. He also mentioned some of the crew members with whom he worked, including Trevor Hoffman for vocal arrangements and David Corman and Sam Ryan for production and that he collaborated with McCarthy on the lyrics.

- "This Strange World" – Twilight Sparkle (voiceover)
- "Equestria Girls (Cafeteria Song)" – Mane Six and students
- "Time to Come Together" – Mane Six (voiceover)
- "This Is Our Big Night" – Mane Six (voiceover)
- "This Is Our Big Night (Reprise)" – Mane Six (voiceover)
- "End Credits Song: A Friend for Life" – Jerrica Santos
- "My Little Pony Friends" (Deleted Song) – Kaylee Johnston, AJ Woodworth, and Laura Hastings The song was written to serve as the end credits to the film, but was passed over in favor of "A Friend for Life". On August 14, 2014, the song was uploaded to Hasbro's YouTube channel.

Composer William Anderson, who provided the score for the film, said that most of the background music remains consistent with the television show, though "with elements of thrash rock once in a while".

== Release ==
=== Marketing ===
On May 12, 2013, a teaser trailer was first released on the New York Times website, followed by a full theatrical trailer on Entertainment Weekly's website on June 7, 2013.

=== Theatrical ===
My Little Pony: Equestria Girls had its world premiere at the Los Angeles Film Festival grand opening celebration on June 15, 2013, as part of its Family Day. The event included appearances by several of the film's creative staff and voice actors. It was then presented under release through Screenvision and Cineplex theaters across the United States and Canada respectively, starting on June 16, 2013. Due to a larger-than-expected number of theater-goers in the initial weeks, Screenvision added additional showings to take advantage of the interest. The screenings in the United States bore no classification from the MPAA (which is not mandatory), while the Canadian screenings had ratings from provincial film classification boards (usually G).

=== Re-releases ===
The film was re-released in select theaters across the United States on June 18 and 19, 2016 by distribution company Kidtoon Films.

In the United Kingdom, the film was released through Showcase Cinemas on August 10, 2013. In Australia, it was released through Village Cinemas on August 24, 2013. In New Zealand, it was released through Event Cinemas for two weeks starting August 31, 2013.

=== Home media ===
The film was released on Region 1 DVD and Blu-ray by Shout! Factory on August 6, 2013. The Blu-ray release includes a behind-the-scenes documentary on: the film's production, karaoke songs, a "ponify yourself" video and a printable poster. Shout! Factory has signed with Hasbro to distribute the film internationally both digitally and in physical medium for home entertainment after its theatrical run.

The Region 4 DVD was released by Madman Entertainment on September 4, 2013. The Region 2 DVD and Blu-ray was supposed to be released by UK-based distributor Clear Vision in April 2014, but the distributor had since entered administration. However, the same UK distributor did manage to release a Region 2 DVD for France and Italy between March and April 2014. The UK version DVD and Blu-ray was eventually released on July 28, 2014.

Alongside Rainbow Rocks and Friendship Games, this film was released in a box set on October 13, 2015 in Region 1.

=== Television ===
The film made its United States television premiere on the Hub Network (a joint venture between Discovery Communications and Hasbro; now known as Discovery Family as of late 2014) on September 1, 2013. On September 22, 2013, the film premiered on YTV in Canada. In the United Kingdom, the film premiered on Pop on November 23, 2013.

== Merchandise and other media ==
The film is a part of My Little Pony: Equestria Girls toy line and media franchise launched by Hasbro, which was briefly mentioned in the media earlier in February and March 2013 and formally announced in May 2013 with this film and other media strategy. It was to be a part of the 30th anniversary of the My Little Pony brand. Hasbro planned to produce related merchandise including: toys, apparel, publishing and accessories. The human-like toys were developed to appeal to girls in their teens as a means to extend the My Little Pony brand. In addition, LB Kids published a novelization of the film and Gameloft included a themed mini-game in its My Little Pony mobile game. IDW published a backstory of the characters in the alternative universe (including Sunset Shimmer) in a stand-alone issue.

=== Soundtrack ===
The film's soundtrack was released on September 23, 2014, via the ITunes Store. "This Strange World" is absent in the album. On October 2, 2014 (chart of October 11), the soundtrack placed #15, where the "My Little Pony Equestria Girls: Rainbow Rocks" soundtrack was two weeks ago on September 18.

No.	Title	Writer(s)	Performer(s)	Length
1.	"Opening Titles (Remix)"	Daniel Ingram and Lauren Faust	Rebecca Shoichet	1:29
2.	"Equestria Girls (Cafeteria Song)"	Ingram and Meghan McCarthy	Shannon Chan-Kent, Kazumi Evans, Ashleigh Ball, Andrea Libman, Shoichet, ensemble	2:53
3.	"Time to Come Together"	Ingram and McCarthy	Shoichet, Evans, Ball, Libman, Chan-Kent, ensemble	2:08
4.	"This Is Our Big Night"	Ingram and McCarthy	Shoichet, Ball, Libman, Chan-Kent, Evans	2:03
5.	"A Friend for Life"	Ingram	Jerrica Santos	2:26
Total length:				11.33

== Reception ==
=== Media sales ===
Upon release to home video, Shout! Factory reported that more than 100,000 units have been ordered at retail, the largest release that the company has seen in its ten-year history. As a result of the success, Hasbro has signed Shout! to continue distribution of other out-of-print My Little Pony titles from earlier generations such as The Princess Promenade, as well as newer animated Transformers shows.

=== Television viewership ===
My Little Pony: Equestria Girls premiered on the Hub Network on September 1, 2013. The film was viewed by 553,000 viewers. It earned year-to-year delivery time gains among multiple demographics, most notably girls 6-11 (+1056%). In the United Kingdom, 93,000 viewers watched the television broadcast on Pop, the most for the week of November 18–24.

=== Critical response ===
There has been criticism over the anthropomorphism approach of the franchise overall (including this film). The New York Daily News reported that, while some feared allowing their children to be influenced by the looks of humanized characters, others considered it reasonable with other current media with considerable body exposure. Slate's Amanda Marcotte considered that the characters' change to human-like form was to popularize the film with the adult fanbase of Friendship Is Magic. However, many of these adult fans expressed disappointment over the humanized characters, worrying that the approach "goes against everything that Pony was trying to prove". Craig McCracken, speaking for his wife Lauren Faust, Friendship Is Magic's creative showrunner for the first two seasons before stepping down, expressed concern that such approach would have gone against the way Faust wanted to take the television series.

The film itself received mixed reviews from critics. Daniel Alvarez of the website Unleash the Fanboy gave the film 4 stars out of 5, stating that Equestria Girls was a "highly entertaining movie", though some elements, such as the brief romantic plot and Sunset's ultimate fate, were weaker than other parts of the film. Luke Thompson of Topless Robot was more critical of the film, as while not a viewer of Friendship Is Magic, he believed "whatever clever concepts the show may have [...] the movie does not do very much with" and considered the animation sub-standard for a TV-to-film adaptation. Iowa State Daily described the film as one that was "probably just made to sell dolls and figurines", though still delivered a "great message for kids". Gwen Ihnat of The A.V. Club rated the film a "B−" and considered that the film "is only a few songs and one amazing demon battle scene better than most of Friendship Is Magic's two-part episodes", while otherwise treading on clichéd ideas from both the Friendship Is Magic and from other teen high school works. Sherilyn Connelly of SF Weekly, though having enjoyed the film, felt that it was too similar to the television series's pilot episodes in how the characters needed to be re-introduced for the film audience and that the "real disconnect" was the apparent reduction of age, from young adult in Friendship Is Magic to teenagers within the film. Connelly did, however, vote for the film as Best Animated Feature in the 2013 Village Voice Film Critics' Poll. Ed Liu of Toon Zone (now known as Anime Superhero) considered that the film "relies a bit too much on the familiar and the conventional", lacking Friendship Is Magic's injection of "idiosyncratic character" into otherwise predictable plots, but otherwise praised the voice actors, music and some of the film's animation.
