= My Little Pony: Equestria Girls – Legend of Everfree =

2016 animated film

- Region 1 DVD cover
- Also known as: Legend of Everfree
- Based on: My Little Pony: Equestria Girls toy line and media franchise by Hasbro
- Written by: Kristine Songco; Joanna Lewis
- Directed by: Ishi Rudell
- Starring: Rebecca Shoichet; Tara Strong; Ashleigh Ball; Andrea Libman; Tabitha St. Germain; Cathy Weseluck; Enid-Raye Adams; Brian Doe
- Music by: William Kevin Anderson
- Countries of origin: Canada; United States
- Original language: English

Production
- Executive producers: Stephen Davis; Kirsten Newlands; Sarah Wall; Asaph Fipke
- Producer: Angela Belyea
- Editors: Shannon Archibald; Tom Harris
- Running time: 73 minutes
- Production companies: DHX Media; Hasbro Studios

Original release
- Network: Discovery Kids Latin America
- Release: September 24, 2016
- Network: Netflix
- Release: October 1, 2016

My Little Pony: Equestria Girls – Legend of Everfree (or simply Legend of Everfree) is a 2016 animated musical fantasy film directed by Ishi Rudell and written by Kristine Songco and Joanna Lewis. Produced by DHX Media Vancouver for Hasbro Studios, it is the sequel to My Little Pony: Equestria Girls – Friendship Games (2015), and the fourth installment in Hasbro's Equestria Girls franchise, which serves as a spin-off to the 2010 relaunch of My Little Pony.

Like the previous Equestria Girls films, Legend of Everfree re-envisions the main characters of the parent franchise, normally ponies, as teenage humanoid characters in a high school setting. Set during the events of the sixth season of Friendship Is Magic, the film's plot concerns the students of Canterlot High School attending a field trip to Camp Everfree, which becomes plagued with bizarre magical circumstances relating to a local urban legend.

My Little Pony: Equestria Girls – Legend of Everfree was first broadcast Discovery Kids Latin America on September 24, 2016, prior to its streaming release on Netflix in the United States on October 1, as well as its home media release by Shout! Factory on November 1. Critics praised the animation, voice acting, and music, but took issue with its script, plot, and overabundance of plotlines. Legend of Everfree was the last feature-length film in the Equestria Girls franchise. All further works consisted of television specials and short-form series, starting with a trilogy of half-hour specials that aired on Discovery Family in 2017.

== Plot ==
The students of Canterlot High School attend a field trip to Camp Everfree, a nature camp owned by Gloriosa Daisy and her brother, Timber Spruce. During the bus ride, transfer student Twilight Sparkle has a nightmare of being overtaken by "Midnight Sparkle", a malevolent alter ego of herself produced while temporarily corrupted by Equestrian magic. Her friend Sunset Shimmer is supportive, relating to her own similar experience of transforming into a demon. Shortly upon arrival at the camp, Twilight develops telekinetic powers, which she worries is a sign of Midnight's lingering presence.

That night, Timber tells a campfire story about a forest spirit named Gaea Everfree (Note: As the spirit's name is spelled in the official novelization.) being angered by the camp's construction and threatens to unleash a plague of natural disasters upon it. The next day, a sailboat crashes into a dock the campers are building to use as a fashion show runway. The terrified campers spot glittering gem dust that matches the description of Gaea's presence in Timber's story, convincing them that Gaea is real. Twilight, however, believes her magic to be responsible for the accident and distances herself from her friends.

Later, Twilight's friends begin developing superpowers which they can only use within the camp's boundaries (Rainbow Dash gains super speed, Fluttershy gets the ability to communicate with animals, Pinkie Pie can create explosions using sprinkles, Rarity can make diamonds out of thin air, and Applejack receives super strength). Now believing her magic is infecting her friends, Twilight prepares to run away from the camp. Sunset follows Twilight into the woods and, discovering her power of telepathic empathy, convinces her to stay. As Timber leads them back to the camp, Sunset notices gem dust falling from his pocket and suspects him of staging Gaea's attacks. She later overhears him arguing with Gloriosa about abandoning what Sunset assumes to be the camp. Remembering his earlier statements of longing for urban life, Sunset concludes that Timber means to shut the camp down by terrorizing the campers.

Sunset brings Twilight and Spike with her to investigate a nearby cave kept off-limits by Timber, where they find geodes infused with Equestrian magic. The three are confronted by Gloriosa, who reveals herself to be the true cause of the natural disasters. Sunset learns through her visions that Gloriosa, desperate to prevent the camp's closure, has been wearing the geodes as a necklace to harness their power, with the "disasters" resulting from her reckless attempts at using magic to improve the campers' experience; Timber, anticipating this, invented the story of Gaea Everfree to cover for her.

Gloriosa adds more geodes to the necklace and is completely corrupted by their power, taking on an appearance resembling Gaea. Crashing the campers' fashion show rehearsal, Gloriosa enacts her intent to "protect" them by trapping the camp in a bramble cage. When Sunset's friends fail to stop Gloriosa's insane rampage, they encourage Twilight to embrace her magic to assist. Following one final struggle against Midnight, Twilight asserts control of herself and takes the geode necklace apart, freeing Gloriosa from its influence. The geodes become pendants for Twilight and her friends, who gain new magical forms and restore the camp. Still faced with the camp's closure, the girls organize a last-minute fundraiser ball held within the cave. Their plan is successful, attracting a large crowd of former campers and saving the camp.

== Cast ==
- Rebecca Shoichet as Sunset Shimmer, one of Twilight's friends who gains the power to empathetically sense others' thoughts and feelings through physical touch.
- Tara Strong as Twilight Sparkle, a transfer student at Canterlot High who is haunted by nightmares of Midnight Sparkle, her temporary evil personality from the third film. She gains telekinesis.
  - Shoichet performs Twilight Sparkle's singing voice.
- Ashleigh Ball as Rainbow Dash, who gains super speed; and Applejack, who gains super strength.
- Andrea Libman as Pinkie Pie, who can infuse sprinkles with explosive energy; and Fluttershy, who can communicate with animals.
  - Shannon Chan-Kent performs Pinkie Pie's singing voice.
- Tabitha St. Germain as Rarity, who can create diamond-like force fields; and Vice Principal Luna, Principal Celestia's younger sister.
  - Kazumi Evans performs Rarity's singing voice.
- Cathy Weseluck as Spike, Twilight's talking pet dog.
- Enid-Raye Adams as Gloriosa Daisy, the owner and director of Camp Everfree, and the film's main antagonist. She is also the older sister of Timber Spruce.
  - Kelly Metzger performs Gloriosa's singing voice.
- Brian Doe as Timber Spruce, Gloriosa's younger brother and a camp counselor with whom Twilight is in love.
- Nicole Oliver as Principal Celestia, the head of Canterlot High School.
- Vincent Tong as Flash Sentry, a camper enamored with Twilight's princess counterpart from Equestria who struggles to disassociate the two.
- Brian Drummond as Filthy Rich, a businessman who threatens to replace the camp with a spa resort.

The film also features minor speaking roles with Michael Dobson as Bulk Biceps; Lee Tockar and Richard Ian Cox as Snips and Snails; Kathleen Barr as Trixie; Tong as Sandalwood; St. Germain as Muffins; Ball as Lyra Heartstrings; and Libman as Sweetie Drops. (Note: Named "Bonbon" in the closing credits)

== Production ==
After the third Equestria Girls installment, Legend of Everfree was first mentioned in a Hasbro 2016 Entertainment Plan presentation in August 2015, this film was further teased by Rainbow Rocks co-director and Friendship Games director Ishi Rudell. When asked on Twitter if "we might get more #EquestriaGirls media of any kind", Rudell replied, "Yup, there's a pretty good chance." During a keynote presentation at MIPJunior 2015, Hasbro Studios president Stephen Davis confirmed that a fourth Equestria Girls film was in development at the time.

The film's production started while Friendship Games was still being finished, lasted for a "little over a year and a half", and its completion was confirmed by Rudell in mid-August 2016. According to the film's assistant director Katrina Hadley, there may have been "a small scene with" Lyra Heartstrings and Sweetie Drops "cut from the animatic".

Film director Ishi Rudell credits Hadley and art director Jeremy Tin for designing the Crystal Gala dresses during "Legend You Were Meant To Be" but adds "it was a team effort".

This film marks the return of Meghan McCarthy to the Equestria Girls film series, albeit as co-executive producer. This is also the only Equestria Girls film not to involve Jayson Thiessen in any way as he was busy directing the 2017 My Little Pony theatrical feature film, which was still in production at the time.

=== Music ===
Like the previous three installments, the songs were composed by Daniel Ingram with lyric writing shared between Ingram and screenwriters Joanna Lewis and Kristine Songco; except "Embrace the Magic" which had lyrics by Lewis and Songco, and "Hope Shines Eternal" had lyrics by Ingram.

- "The Legend of Everfree" – Twilight Sparkle, Sunset Shimmer, Applejack, Fluttershy, Pinkie Pie, Rainbow Dash, Rarity, and ensemble (voiceover)
- "The Midnight in Me" – Twilight Sparkle
- "Embrace the Magic" - Sunset Shimmer
- "We Will Stand for Everfree" – Gloriosa Daisy
- "Legend You Were Meant to Be" – The Rainbooms
- "End Credits Song: Hope Shines Eternal" – The cast (voiceover)

== Release ==
=== Marketing ===
On July 7, 2016, a teaser trailer was published on YouTube depicting a slideshow of scenery backgrounds.

The film's first official trailer was revealed on the Entertainment Weekly's website on July 22, 2016. A shorter 30-second trailer was released on YouTube on August 1.

=== Television ===
Before its United States release, the film premiered on September 24, 2016, on Discovery Kids Latin America. In the United States, the film was first shown on Discovery Family on November 5, 2016.

=== Home media and streaming ===
On October 1, 2016, the film was made available for streaming on Netflix in the United States.

Legend of Everfree was released on DVD and Blu-ray on November 1, 2016, in the United States and Canada by Shout! Factory. Announced bonus features include audio commentary from the crew, a fictional two-minute "blooper reel" (which was published earlier onto YouTube on October 27, 2016), and sing-alongs.

== Merchandise and other media ==
The film is a part of the camp-themed Legend of Everfree lineup, a fourth installment in the My Little Pony: Equestria Girls toy line and media franchise, first mentioned in a Hasbro 2016 Entertainment Plan presentation in August 2015 along with this film. The toys were presented at the 2016 American International Toy Fair, and released in July 2016. LB Kids published a novelization of the film, as well as a storybook adaptation, subtitled Save Our Camp!.

=== Soundtrack ===
The film's soundtrack was released on Google Play and iTunes Store on September 16, 2016. It was later released, freely, by Hasbro's YouTube channel on September 28, 2016.

No.	Title	Writer(s)	Performer(s)	Length
1.	"Legend of Everfree (Main Title)"	Daniel Ingram, Joanna Lewis, and Kristine Songco	Rebecca Shoichet, Ashleigh Ball, Andrea Libman, Shannon Chan-Kent, Kazumi Evans, and choir	2:13
2.	"The Midnight in Me"	Ingram, Lewis, and Songco	Shoichet	1:32
3.	"Embrace the Magic"	Lewis and Songco	Shoichet	2:30
4.	"We Will Stand for Everfree"	Ingram, Lewis, and Songco	Kelly Metzger	2:03
5.	"Legend You Are Meant to Be"	Ingram, Lewis, and Songco	Shoichet, Ball, Libman, Chan-Kent, and Evans	2:32
6.	"Hope Shines Eternal"	Ingram	Shoichet, Ball, Libman, Chan-Kent, Evans, and choir	2:35
Total length:				13:25

== Reception ==
Legend of Everfree received mixed reviews from critics. Dakster Sullivan of GeekMom considered the film's story underwhelming following her expectations of the trailer, calling it "less of one overall plot with a grand finale and more of a bunch of subplots that are tied together in the end". However, she added that the subplots "aren't badly written and are actually kind of fun to watch". Ed Liu of ToonZone (now Anime Superhero) discussed the film's culmination of plot threads and "loose ends" from previous Equestria Girls films, which he felt would be more suitable for a television series than a self-contained film, opining "a certain lack of satisfaction by the time the end-credits roll". Francis Rizzo III of DVD Talk gave the film's home release a score of 3.5 out of 5 stars, criticizing its lack of musical numbers and bonus content compared to previous Equestria Girls films, but praising its humor, action sequences, and animation quality. On the film's new characters, she called Gloriosa Daisy "a fine addition, with a different-enough energy to differentiate her from the characters seen in earlier films", while considering Timber Spruce "less engaging", noting the franchise's diminishment of male characters.

== Awards and nominations ==
Year	Award	Category	Nominee	Result
2017	44th Daytime Emmy Awards	Outstanding Original Song	Daniel Ingram, Joanna Lewis, and Kristine Songco (for "The Legend of Everfree")	Nominated
2017	Behind the Voice Actors Awards	Best Female Vocal Performance in a TV Special/Direct-to-DVD Title or Short	Rebecca Shoichet (as Sunset Shimmer)	Won (Note: Won via People's Choice as chosen by the BTVA community.)
