= My Little Pony: Equestria Girls (2017 television specials) =

2017 animated television series

- Also known as: My Little Pony: Equestria Girls – Magical Movie Night; My Little Pony: Equestria Girls – Tales of Canterlot High
- Genre: Fantasy; Magical girl; Adventure
- Written by: G.M. Berrow ("Dance Magic"); Noelle Benvenuti ("Movie Magic"); Rachel Vine ("Mirror Magic"); Dave Polsky ("Mirror Magic")
- Directed by: Ishi Rudell
- Voices of: Rebecca Shoichet; Tara Strong; Ashleigh Ball; Andrea Libman; Tabitha St. Germain; Cathy Weseluck
- Composers: Kelly Davidson; John Houston; William Kevin Anderson
- Countries of origin: United States; Canada
- Original language: English
- No. of episodes: 3

Production
- Executive producers: Stephen Davis; Sarah Wall; Kirsten Newlands; Asaph Fipke ("Dance Magic" and "Movie Magic")
- Producer: Angela Belyea
- Editors: Shannon Archibald; Tom Harris
- Running time: 22 minutes
- Production companies: DHX Media; Hasbro Studios

Original release
- Network: Discovery Family
- Release: June 24 – July 8, 2017

My Little Pony: Equestria Girls (Note: Also known as My Little Pony: Equestria Girls – Magical Movie Night on home media release and My Little Pony: Equestria Girls – Tales of Canterlot High on Netflix.) is a trilogy of animated television specials based on the toy line and media franchise by Hasbro, which was spun-off from the 2010 relaunch of My Little Pony. As with prior installments, the specials follow the main characters from the television series My Little Pony: Friendship Is Magic, re-envisioned as humanoid teenagers attending high school.

Three 22-minute specials were produced by DHX Media Vancouver for Hasbro Studios. First announced in October 2016, they aired from June 24 to July 8, 2017, on Discovery Family (a channel partly owned by Hasbro).

== Premise ==
The specials follow the daily lives and adventures of Canterlot High School's top students – Twilight Sparkle, Sunset Shimmer, Applejack, Fluttershy, Pinkie Pie, Rainbow Dash, and Rarity – following the events of My Little Pony: Equestria Girls – Legend of Everfree.

== Cast and characters ==
=== Main ===
- Rebecca Shoichet as Sunset Shimmer
- Tara Strong as Twilight Sparkle
  - Rebecca Shoichet as Twilight Sparkle (singing voice)
- Ashleigh Ball as Rainbow Dash and Applejack
- Andrea Libman as Pinkie Pie and Fluttershy
- Tabitha St. Germain as Rarity
  - Kazumi Evans as Rarity (singing voice)
- Cathy Weseluck as Spike

=== Supporting ===
- Sharon Alexander as Sour Sweet
- Sienna Bohn as Sugarcoat
- Britt Irvin as Sunny Flare
- Shannon Chan-Kent as Lemon Zest
- Andy Toth as Canter Zoom
- Ali Liebert as Juniper Montage
- Kira Tozer as Chestnut Magnifico
- Charles Zuckerman as Stalwart Stallion
- Kelly Sheridan as Starlight Glimmer

=== Additional voices ===
- Ashleigh Ball
- Andrea Libman
- Tabitha St. Germain
- Rebecca Shoichet
- Andy Toth
- Charles Zuckerman
- Kelly Sheridan

== Specials ==
No.	Title	Directed by	Written by	Original release date
1	"Dance Magic"	Ishi Rudell	Gillian M. Berrow	June 24, 2017
Desperate to raise funds to help repair Camp Everfree, Rarity finds out about a music video contest with a sufficient cash prize, and convinces her friends to enter and spend their existing funds on costume materials. The students of Crystal Prep Academy are also entering, in order to rent a yacht for their spring dance, and trick Rarity into sharing her music video theme idea with them. After buying the materials, Rarity discovers the Crystal Prep students rehearsing with similar outfits, and realizes they have stolen her idea. Pressed for time and unable to think of a new theme, Rarity despairs until she overhears the Crystal Prep students worrying that they have no song prepared for their music video. At Rarity's proposition, the two groups set their rivalry aside and collaborate on a single video that wins the contest, allowing both groups to split the prize and meet their goals.
2	"Movie Magic"	Ishi Rudell	Noelle Benvenuti	July 1, 2017
The girls are invited to a behind-the-scenes look at the upcoming Daring Do film by director Canter Zoom as a reward for their camp fundraiser. During their visit, the film's production is jeopardized when lead actress Chestnut Magnifico encounters scheduling conflicts, a set piece falls apart during shooting, and several author-approved props are stolen. The girls determine that someone is sabotaging the movie, and pursue a cloaked suspect running loose with the stolen props around the studio. The girls eventually catch the hooded culprit and correctly deduce her to be Juniper Montage, Canter's niece and production assistant, who is envious of Chestnut and hoped to make her quit by delaying the movie so she could take her place. Juniper is banned from the studio as punishment, and with the production issues settled, the girls are given minor roles in the movie as repayment for their efforts.
3	"Mirror Magic"	Ishi Rudell	Rachel Vine & Dave Polsky	July 8, 2017
Sunset Shimmer runs out of pages in her magic journal to write to Princess Twilight in Equestria, so she returns home to pick up a new one. There Sunset meets Starlight Glimmer, Twilight's student, who is curious about the parallel world and persuades Sunset to take her for a visit. Meanwhile, Juniper Montage happens upon a hand mirror that is enchanted with Equestrian magic, showing her reflection as a famous and beloved movie star. Feeling resentful towards the girls for upstaging her, Juniper discovers the mirror can also trap objects and people inside it, which she uses on Sunset's friends in a fit of anger. Sunset also becomes trapped in the mirror after returning with Starlight. The combined magic of the girls' geode pendants morphs Juniper into a giant monster. The mirror falls and cracks during Juniper's rampage, causing the world inside the mirror to collapse into a void. Understanding Juniper's desire for friendship, Starlight persuades her to release the girls before they fall into the void. Juniper returns to normal and is forgiven by the girls, while Princess Twilight gives Starlight permission to stay a while longer to experience the parallel world.

== Release ==
=== Broadcast ===
The specials aired in the United States from June 24 to July 8, 2017, on Discovery Family, a joint venture between Discovery Communications and Hasbro, as part of the channel's "Summer Splash" seasonal event. The Summer 2017 music videos, also aired as a part of the event, share the same title sequence as the specials.

Prior to the U.S. broadcast, the specials aired in Poland on Teletoon+ from May 14 to May 28, 2017.

=== Home media ===
The three specials were released on a one-disc Region 1 DVD on August 8, 2017 by Shout! Factory under the title My Little Pony: Equestria Girls – Magical Movie Night. Under the title My Little Pony: Equestria Girls – Tales of Canterlot High, the specials were also made available on the Netflix video streaming service on October 1, 2017.

== Reception ==
The Magical Movie Night compilation DVD release received mixed reviews, with criticism directed towards the DVD's lower visual and sound quality compared to previous films as well as the lack of extra content. Brett Nolan of NoReruns.net praised the DVD's presentation of the specials as a single film, saying it gave the specials "a much more cohesive and cinematic feel, lending itself beautifully to watching it straight through in one go." Joe Corey of Inside Pulse gave the specials an overall score of 4 out of 5, including his daughter's input that she "wasn't bothered that this wasn't one narrative such as the previous four movies". Classic Speedy of ToonZone (now Anime Superhero) called "Dance Magic" a "slight but fun story", while considering "Mirror Magic" to be the best of the three stories as a direct follow-up of the second special, and for its "unexpected" inclusion of Starlight Glimmer as a character. Conversely, Francis Rizzo III of DVD Talk, while giving the story content three out of five stars, drew unfavorable comparisons to Friendship Is Magic as he felt it contrasted the previous films' "sense of identity built around music and a quasi-magical backstory", considering the specials to be "more like a standard earthbound teen cartoon that eventually remembers that there are superpowers involved come the third episode".
