= My Little Pony: Equestria Girls =

Entertainment franchise developed by Hasbro based on My Little Pony

- Logo introduced in 2017
- Created by: Hasbro
- Original work: Toys
- Years: 2013–2020

Print publications
- Book: (see Books sub-section)
- Comics: (see Comics sub-section)

Films and television
- Films: Equestria Girls (2013); Rainbow Rocks (2014); Friendship Games (2015); Legend of Everfree (2016)
- Short films: Canterlot shorts (2017); Music videos (2017); Better Together (2017–2020)
- Television specials: Magical Movie Night/Tales of Canterlot High (2017); Forgotten Friendship (2018); Rollercoaster of Friendship (2018); Spring Breakdown (2019); Sunset's Backstage Pass (2019); Holidays Unwrapped (2019)

Games
- Video games: Equestria Girls mobile app; Equestria Girls mini-game in Gameloft's MLP mobile app

Audio
- Soundtrack: (see Soundtracks section)

Miscellaneous
- Toy: My Little Pony: Equestria Girls

My Little Pony: Equestria Girls (or simply Equestria Girls) is a fashion doll and media franchise launched in 2013 by American toy company Hasbro, as a spin-off of the 2010 relaunch of the My Little Pony toy line.

The franchise features anthropomorphized versions of characters from the Friendship Is Magic television series; as with My Little Pony, the dolls have colorful bodies and hair, while incorporating their pony counterparts' "cutie marks" in their clothing. Along with licensed merchandise, Hasbro (through its subsidiary Allspark Animation) has commissioned several animated works to accompany the doll line, including four films, eight television specials, and multiple short-form series.

The setting of Equestria Girls is established as a parallel universe to the main world of Equestria in the 2010 incarnation of My Little Pony, populated by humanoid versions of the "Mane Six" and other characters; Hasbro's marketing materials describe them as "full-time students and part-time magical pony girls".

== Premise ==
Equestria Girls takes place in an alternate version of Equestria resembling modern-day Earth, which is populated by humanoid counterparts to the pony characters of Friendship Is Magic. This world is accessible through a magical mirror that was once kept in the Crystal Empire, before being relocated to Twilight Sparkle's castle sometime later. In Equestria Girls media, pony characters from Friendship Is Magic who travel through the mirror assume humanoid forms in the alternate setting and vice versa.

Most Equestria Girls characters are similar to their Friendship Is Magic counterparts in terms of appearance and personality. Several locales in the parallel world serve as counterparts to the main cities and establishments in Equestria: Canterlot High School (CHS), for example, corresponds to Canterlot in Equestria, and is run by Principal Celestia and Vice Principal Luna, who are counterparts of Equestria's rulers Princess Celestia and Princess Luna.

=== Characters ===
The main characters are collectively referred to in merchandise as the "Equestria Girls". Beginning with Rainbow Rocks, they are also the members of a rock band called the "Rainbooms". In Legend of Everfree, they are granted magical abilities from geodes they discover at the titular camp.

- Twilight Sparkle (voiced by Tara Strong, singing voice by Rebecca Shoichet) – Two different versions of Twilight Sparkle appear in the Equestria Girls franchise:
  - Princess Twilight Sparkle, the unicorn with wings who appeared in Friendship Is Magic, transformed into a humanoid teenager after traveling from Equestria. In Rainbow Rocks, she temporarily assumes the role of vocalist in the Rainbooms.
  - Twilight Sparkle (a.k.a. Sci-Twi), the alternate universe counterpart, formally debuts in Friendship Games as a student at Crystal Prep Academy, who eventually transfers to Canterlot High School after being saved by Sunset Shimmer from being transformed into her evil alter ego Midnight Sparkle. She joins the Rainbooms as a backup vocalist and has telekinetic powers.
- Spike (voiced by Cathy Weseluck) – As with Twilight Sparkle, two versions of Spike have appeared in the franchise:
  - His Friendship Is Magic incarnation, a dragon, is transformed into a dog upon traveling through the portal from Equestria with Princess Twilight Sparkle. He retains the ability to speak in this form.
  - His alternate universe counterpart is an ordinary dog and Sci-Twi's pet, formally introduced in Friendship Games. He gains the ability to talk after exposure to Equestrian magic.
- Sunset Shimmer (voiced by Rebecca Shoichet) – A unicorn from Equestria who resides in the parallel world as a CHS student. Originally the main antagonist of the first Equestria Girls film, she reforms and becomes the leader of the parallel world's counterparts of the main characters. She joins the Rainbooms as a rhythm guitarist and can read people's minds by physically touching them.
- Applejack (voiced by Ashleigh Ball) – A CHS student who works on her family's farm. She is the Rainbooms' bass guitarist and has super strength.
- Rainbow Dash (voiced by Ashleigh Ball) – A CHS student and star athlete, stated to be the captain of every sports team the school has. She is the Rainbooms' electric guitarist, lead vocalist and songwriter, and has super speed.
- Pinkie Pie (voiced by Andrea Libman, singing voice by Shannon Chan-Kent and occasionally Libman) – An eccentric and friendly CHS student. She is the Rainbooms' drummer and can make candies and sugary foods explosive.
- Rarity (voiced by Tabitha St. Germain, singing voice by Kazumi Evans) – A CHS student and talented seamstress. She is the Rainbooms' keytarist and can create diamond-like force fields.
- Fluttershy (voiced by Andrea Libman) – A CHS student who volunteers at the local animal shelter. She is the Rainbooms' tambourinist and can communicate with animals.

==== Antagonists ====
- The Dazzlings – The main antagonists of Rainbow Rocks. The Dazzlings are a villainous trio of sirens consisting of leader Adagio Dazzle (voiced by Kazumi Evans), abrasive Aria Blaze (voiced by Diana Kaarina, singing voice by Shylo Sharity), and airheaded Sonata Dusk (voiced by Maryke Hendrikse, singing voice by Madeline Merlo in Rainbow Rocks and by Shannon Chan-Kent in Sunset's Backstage Pass). The Dazzlings were banished to the parallel world by Star Swirl the Bearded, and seek control of the population through their enchanted singing. They also appear in Sunset's Backstage Pass as minor characters.
- Abacus Cinch (voiced by Iris Quinn) – The main antagonist of Friendship Games. Cinch is the strict principal of Crystal Prep Academy, a prestigious rival to Canterlot High School, and is obsessed with maintaining her school's reputation by manipulating her prized pupil, the alternate universe counterpart of Twilight Sparkle. In "Dance Magic", it is mentioned that she was replaced as Crystal Prep's principal by Dean Cadance, the counterpart of Princess Cadance.
- Gloriosa Daisy (voiced by Enid-Raye Adams, singing voice by Kelly Metzger) – The main antagonist of Legend of Everfree. Gloriosa is a misguided counselor at Camp Everfree who, in an attempt to save the camp from closing, seizes geodes imbued with Equestrian magic that turn her into a creature named Gaea Everfree.
- Juniper Montage (voiced by Ali Liebert) – The main antagonist of the 2017 specials "Movie Magic" and "Mirror Magic". The niece of film director Canter Zoom, Juniper sabotages her uncle's production in "Movie Magic" in hopes of being cast as the lead actress. In "Mirror Magic", she finds an enchanted mirror that traps the main characters and corrupts her into a fame-obsessed giantess.
- Wallflower Blush (voiced by Shannon Chan-Kent) – An antisocial student and the main antagonist of Forgotten Friendship. Ignored by the school population and resentful of Sunset's evolution from hated bully to beloved friend, Wallflower uses a mystical, memory-erasing stone to turn Sunset's best friends' against her.
- Vignette Valencia (voiced by Tegan Moss) – The main antagonist of Rollercoaster of Friendship. Vignette is the public relations director for the new Equestria Land amusement park and relies on social media to promote it. A wisp of Equestrian magic later enchants her smartphone, allowing her to create holograms.
- PostCrush – The main antagonists of Sunset's Backstage Pass. PostCrush is a pop music duo consisting of lead vocalist and guitarist Kiwi Lollipop (K-Lo; voiced by Lili Beaudoin, singing voice by Marie Hui) and drummer Supernova Zap (Su-Z; voiced by Mariee Devereux, singing voice by Arielle Tuliao). Disastisfied with their performances, they use an Equestrian artifact called the Time Twirler to create a time loop, inadvertently causing Sunset Shimmer to relive the first day of the Starswirled Music Festival.

==== Supporting characters ====
- Principal Celestia (voiced by Nicole Oliver) – The principal of Canterlot High.
- Vice Principal Luna (voiced by Tabitha St. Germain) – The vice principal of Canterlot High and Celestia's younger sister.
- Cheerilee (voiced by Nicole Oliver) – A teacher and librarian at Canterlot High.
- Mr. Cranky Doodle (voiced by Richard Newman) – A grumpy teacher at Canterlot High who is also a driving test instructor.
- Granny Smith (voiced by Tabitha St. Germain) – Applejack's grandmother and a cafeteria worker at Canterlot High.
- Flash Sentry (voiced by Vincent Tong) – A CHS student and Sunset Shimmer's ex-boyfriend, who takes a romantic interest in Twilight but is seen renewing his relationship with Sunset after her reform. His Equestrian counterpart, a royal pegasus guard at the Crystal Empire, appears in the first film and Forgotten Friendship, and has brief appearances in Friendship Is Magic.
- Cutie Mark Crusaders (voiced by Michelle Creber, Claire Corlett, and Madeleine Peters) – A club consisting of three younger students, Apple Bloom, Sweetie Belle, and Scootaloo. Apple Bloom and Sweetie Belle are the sisters of Applejack and Rarity, respectively.
- Snips and Snails (voiced by Lee Tockar and Richard Ian Cox) – Two troublemaking younger students who act as Sunset Shimmer's assistants in the first film.
- DJ Pon-3 – A mute disc jockey and CHS student who helps the Rainbooms defeat the Dazzlings in the second film.
- Big McIntosh (voiced by Peter New) – A CHS student who is Applejack's laconic brother.
- Octavia Melody (voiced by Kazumi Evans) – A cellist and CHS student.
- Photo Finish (voiced by Tabitha St. Germain) – A CHS student who is a pretentious photographer often accompanied by two silent assistants, Violet Blurr and Pixel Pizzaz.
- Trixie Lulamoon (voiced by Kathleen Barr) – A braggart magician and CHS student who is a minor antagonist in Rainbow Rocks, where she and her bandmates trap the Rainbooms under an amphitheater stage. In Forgotten Friendship, she helps Sunset Shimmer find the Memory Stone.
- The Shadowbolts – The Shadowbolts are Crystal Prep's sports team that opposes Canterlot High's Wondercolts team. Apart from the counterpart of Twilight Sparkle, the team includes: the blunt Sugarcoat (voiced by Sienna Bohn), two-faced Sour Sweet (voiced by Sharon Alexander), hyper-competitive Indigo Zap (voiced by Kelly Sheridan), disdainful Sunny Flare, (voiced by Britt Irvin) and rocker girl Lemon Zest (voiced by Shannon Chan-Kent).
- Timber Spruce (voiced by Brian Doe) – Timber Spruce is the younger brother of Gloriosa Daisy and another counselor at Camp Everfree. He is introduced in Legend of Everfree and becomes a love interest for Sci-Twi.
- Zephyr Breeze (voiced by Ryan Beil) – Fluttershy's brother and a CHS student.

== Development and release ==
The 2010 incarnation of the My Little Pony toy line and its associated television series My Little Pony: Friendship Is Magic, despite targeting younger children, attracted an unexpected cult following of older male fans in their 20s and 30s, known as "bronies". Artwork produced by these fans included re-imaginings of the Friendship Is Magic cast as humans. Hasbro saw this art and came up with the idea of developing the spin-off with a similar aesthetic.

The earliest known official use of the "Equestria Girls" name occurred in 2011 when the American television channel The Hub (a joint venture between Discovery Communications and Hasbro; now known as Discovery Family) released a promotional trailer for Hasbro Studio's Friendship Is Magic television series, featuring a modified version of Katy Perry's "California Gurls". However, the trailer had no connection to the later-launched franchise.

In December 2012, Hasbro registered a trademark for the name "Equestria Girls" at the United States Patent and Trademark Office (USPTO). The franchise was briefly mentioned in the media earlier in February and March 2013. In an interview in the February/March 2013 issue of the Kidscreen magazine, Hasbro's senior vice president of international distribution and development, Finn Arnesen, called My Little Pony a "top-priority" brand for the company; the film was described as "a new companion series" that would "[send] the pony heroes on a mission to a new world where they take on human form". Equestria Girls was announced in May 2013 with a film and other media strategies, and it was included in Hasbro's licensing program for My Little Pony announced in June 2013, which began at the 2013 Licensing International Expo along with the company's other properties. The spin-off coincided with the 30th anniversary of the My Little Pony brand.

Along with the toys, Hasbro planned to produce related merchandise and media including film, apparel, and accessories. Hasbro's chief marketing officer, John A. Frascotti, called the franchise a "major strategic initiative" for the company. The human-based toys were developed to appeal to girls in their teens as a means to extend the My Little Pony brand. In addition, Hasbro would continue its licensing deals with book publisher Little, Brown and Company and comic book publisher IDW Publishing to publish related works.

Equestria Girls is regarded as Hasbro's take on Monster High, a line of goth-themed fashion dolls launched by Mattel (one of Hasbro's major rivals in the toy industry) in 2010. Monster High featured non-human skin and hair colors, was supported by multimedia tie-ins, and had its popularity and sales peaked in 2012 and 2013. In the same year Hasbro launched Equestria Girls, Mattel introduced a fairytale-themed spin-off of Monster High known as Ever After High.

In audio commentary included on the Rainbow Rocks home media release, Meghan McCarthy commented that Equestria Girls was initially not intended to become an ongoing franchise and that the thought of a sequel did not cross her mind.

== Toys and yearly line-ups ==
My Little Pony: Equestria Girls
- Type: Fashion doll
- Company: Hasbro
- Country: United States
- Availability: 2013–2020

- Equestria Girls (2013): The first lineup to be released, it features a humanized version of My Little Pony characters from the 2010 relaunch.
- Rainbow Rocks (2014): The succeeding lineup named Rainbow Rocks, featuring music-themed toys and media, was first displayed at the 2014 American International Toy Fair.
- Friendship Games (2015): In January 2015, at that year's edition of The Toy Fair in London, some merchandise was unveiled labeled My Little Pony Equestria Girls: Friendship Games. Some vectors for the merchandise include Applejack and Fluttershy in archery outfits, an alternative universe counterpart of Twilight Sparkle, and five new characters introduced with the lineup: Indigo Zap, Lemon Zest, Sour Sweet, Sugarcoat and Sunny Flare. Mentions on the supporting products, alongside the film, were included in Hasbro's investor presentation at the 2015 American International Toy Fair.
  Wondercolts and Shadowbolts dolls were released in late 2015 in two varieties: "School Spirit" classic and "Sporty Style" deluxe. In the Sporty Style assortment, the Wondercolts' Fluttershy and Applejack and the Shadowbolts' Sour Sweet and Twilight Sparkle come with a bow and a quiver of arrows. The Wondercolts' Rainbow Dash and Sunset Shimmer and the Shadowbolts' Indigo Zap and Sugarcoat come with motorcycle helmets and goggles. The Wondercolts' Pinkie Pie and Rarity and the Shadowbolts' Lemon Zest and Sunny Flare come with roller skates. A motocross bike was released in 2015.
- Equestria Girls Minis (2015): A lineup featuring caricatured Equestria Girls characters.
- Legend of Everfree (2016): First mentioned in a Hasbro 2016 Entertainment Plan presentation in August 2015 along with the tie-in film of the same title, a tentative image was shown of a new character whose name was not mentioned at the time. In February 2016, at the 2016 American International Toy Fair, some Legend of Everfree merchandise was revealed. Dolls unveiled were available in four styles: "Geometric Assortment", "Crystal Gala Assortment", "Crystal Wings Assortment" and "Boho Assortment". A new character by the name of Gloriosa Daisy was also revealed during the presentation. The toys were released in July 2016.
- Equestria Girls: Better Together (2017–2020): An updated lineup featuring newly-re-styled caricatured Equestria Girls characters.

== Media ==
=== Animated productions ===
==== Hasbro Studios/Allspark Animation productions ====
Allspark Animation (previously credited under Hasbro Studios), a subsidiary of Hasbro, has commissioned the production of several animated films, specials, and shorts (except Equestria Girls Minis shorts). Most of the animated media were produced by DHX Studios Vancouver's 2D animation team in Canada, except the Canterlot Shorts from 2017, which were produced by Boulder Media in the Republic of Ireland (a company acquired by Hasbro in 2016).

The following works were produced under this scope:

Title	U.S. release date	Director	Screenwriter(s)	Producer(s)
Feature films
Equestria Girls (2013)	June 16, 2013	Jayson Thiessen	Meghan McCarthy	Sarah Wall and Devon Cody
Rainbow Rocks (2014)	September 27, 2014	Jayson Thiessen and Ishi Rudell	Meghan McCarthy	Sarah Wall and Devon Cody
Friendship Games (2015)	September 26, 2015	Ishi Rudell	Josh Haber	Devon Cody
Legend of Everfree (2016)	October 1, 2016	Ishi Rudell	Kristine Songco and Joanna Lewis	Angela Belyea
Specials
Tales of Canterlot High (2017)	June 24, 2017	Ishi Rudell and Katrina Hadley	Gillian Berrow, Noelle Benvenuti, Dave Polsky and Rachel Vine	Angela Belyea
Forgotten Friendship (2018)	February 17, 2018	Ishi Rudell and Katrina Hadley	Nick Confalone	Angela Belyea and Colleen McAllister
Rollercoaster of Friendship (2018)	July 6, 2018	Ishi Rudell and Katrina Hadley	Nick Confalone	Angela Belyea and Colleen McAllister
Spring Breakdown (2019)	March 30, 2019	Ishi Rudell and Katrina Hadley	Nick Confalone	Angela Belyea, Colleen McAllister, and Katherine Crownover
Sunset's Backstage Pass (2019)	July 27, 2019	Ishi Rudell and Katrina Hadley	Whitney Ralls	Angela Belyea, Colleen McAllister, and Katherine Crownover
Holidays Unwrapped (2019)	November 2, 2019	Ishi Rudell and Katrina Hadley	Anna Christopher	Angela Belyea and Katherine Crownover
Shorts
Rainbow Rocks prelude shorts (2014)	March 27, 2014	Ishi Rudell and Jayson Thiessen	Cindy Morrow, Amy Keating Rogers, Josh Haber, and Natasha Levinger	Devon Cody
Rainbow Rocks encore shorts (2015)	April 1, 2015	Ishi Rudell and Jayson Thiessen	Jayson Thiessen, Katrina Hadley, Brian Lenard, Daniel Ingram, and Michael Vogel	Devon Cody
Friendship Games prelude shorts (2015)	August 1, 2015	Ishi Rudell and Jayson Thiessen	Brian Lenard, Natasha Levinger, Ishi Rudell, and Jayson Thiessen	Devon Cody
Canterlot shorts (2017)	July 30, 2017	Ishi Rudell and Katrina Hadley	Gillian M. Berrow	—N/a
Music videos (2017)	July 30, 2017	Ishi Rudell and Katrina Hadley	Various	—N/a
Better Together shorts (2017–2020)	November 17, 2017	Ishi Rudell and Katrina Hadley	Various	Angela Belyea and Colleen McAllister

==== Equestria Girls Minis shorts ====
A media tie-in to promote the Equestria Girls Minis toy line, the animated shorts ranging from 15 to 30 seconds in length were showcased on various online outlets including the toy line's official website and official YouTube channel beginning in late 2015.

The animation studio which produced the shorts is yet to be identified.

List of episodes
No.	Title	Revision/Part	Starring	Duration	Original release date	Note
1	"Pinkie Pie Slumber Party ft. Pinkie Pie"	(initial release)	Pinkie Pie	25 seconds	November 23, 2015	(Note: This version features dialogs spoken in English.)
1	"Pinkie Pie Slumber Party ft. Pinkie Pie"	(revised version)	Pinkie Pie	15 seconds	February 2016	(Note: This version does not feature any spoken dialog.)
2	"Pinkie Pie Slumber Party ft. Twilight Sparkle"	(initial release)	Pinkie Pie; Twilight Sparkle; Spike	15 seconds	January 8, 2016	N/A
2	"Pinkie Pie Slumber Party ft. Twilight Sparkle"	(revised version)	Pinkie Pie; Twilight Sparkle; Spike	15 seconds	February 2016	(Note: This version features some slight graphic alterations on-screen compared to the initial release.)
3	"Pinkie Pie Slumber Party ft. Rarity"	N/A	Pinkie Pie; Rarity	15 seconds	February 11, 2016	N/A
4	"Pinkie Pie Slumber Party"	N/A	The Mane Six	20 seconds	April 6, 2016	N/A
5	"Dance Off"	N/A	The Mane Six; Sunset Shimmer; DJ Pon-3; Flash Sentry	30 seconds	August 15, 2016	N/A
6	"Pillow Fight"	N/A	The Mane Six	20 seconds	November 7, 2016	N/A
7	"Adventures at Canterlot High: Class w/Principal Celestia"	N/A	The Mane Six; Principal Celestia	15 seconds	February 3, 2017	N/A
8	"Adventures at Canterlot High: Sci-Twi's Lab"	N/A	The Mane Six; Photo Finish	15 seconds	February 3, 2017	N/A
9	"The Show Must Go On"	Part 1	The Mane Six; Juniper Montage	15 seconds	July 13, 2017	N/A
10	"The Show Must Go On"	Part 2	The Mane Six; Juniper Montage	15 seconds	July 13, 2017	N/A
11	"Beach Fun"	N/A	The Mane Six; Spike; Trixie	15 seconds	March 22, 2018	N/A
12	"Fun at the Theme Park!"	N/A	The Mane Six	15 seconds	September 13, 2018	N/A

=== Publications ===
==== Books ====
The following juvenile fiction chapter books are originally published by Little, Brown and Company imprint of Hachette Book Group USA. The Orchard Book's imprint of Hachette UK, as well as The Five Mile Press in Australia, also published the books. The dates listed are the American publish dates.

No.	Title	Author	Date
1	Equestria Girls: Through the Mirror	G.M. Berrow	October 1, 2013
2	Equestria Girls: Rainbow Rocks	Perdita Finn	April 8, 2014
3	Equestria Girls: Rainbow Rocks - The Mane Event	Perdita Finn	October 7, 2014
4	Equestria Girls: Sunset Shimmer's Time to Shine	Perdita Finn	May 5, 2015
5	Equestria Girls: Friendship Games	Perdita Finn	October 6, 2015
6	Equestria Girls: Twilight's Sparkly Sleepover Surprise	Perdita Finn	May 17, 2016
7	Equestria Girls: The Legend of Everfree	Perdita Finn	September 6, 2016
8	Equestria Girls: Magic, Magic Everywhere!	Perdita Finn	June 6, 2017
9	Equestria Girls: A Friendship to Remember	Perdita Finn	December 5, 2017

Other than the chapter books, the following books were also published by the LB Kids imprint.

Title	Author	Date
Equestria Girls: Legend of Everfree - Save Our Camp!	Louise Alexander	September 6, 2016
Equestria Girls: Wondercolts Forever	Sadie Chesterfield	January 3, 2017
Canterlot High Stories: Rainbow Dash Brings the Blitz	Arden Hayes	April 3, 2018
Canterlot High Stories: Twilight Sparkle's Science Fair Sparks	Arden Hayes	June 5, 2018
Canterlot High Stories: Pinkie Pie and the Cupcake Calamity	Arden Hayes	October 2, 2018
Make Your Own Magic: The Starswirl Do-Over	Whitney Ralls	February 5, 2019

==== Comics ====
A special short story, featuring the origins of Sunset Shimmer, was published in the IDW My Little Pony: Friendship Is Magic 2013 San Diego Comic-Con comic variant in July 2013. It also included additional stories in a stand-alone issue, titled My Little Pony Annual 2013: Equestria Girls, released on October 30, 2013.

An issue of IDW's Fiendship Is Magic features the Sirens, the evil creatures that appeared in Rainbow Rocks.

No.	Title	US release date	US ISBN
	My Little Pony: Annual 2013	October 30, 2013	1631405152
Stories take place before the first Equestria Girls film, including an 8-page story original book published in the 2013 San Diego Comic-Con variant of the main series, issue #9 (in July 2013), telling the origin of the character Sunset Shimmer. In the short, Sunset is shown as Princess Celestia's prized student in magic arts, whom Celestia hopes to groom into a princess. However, when Sunset becomes corrupted by images she sees in a magic mirror, Celestia realizes that Sunset may be too greedy and vain. Sunset goes against Celestia's wishes and breaks into the dark magic wing of the library, learning about the mirror's function and magic that can transform her into a winged unicorn. Celestia discovers this and expels Sunset as her student, but Sunset manages to escape and pass through the mirror, ending up in the parallel world. In the main story, a prequel to the events of the film but told in flashback from a series of interviews, the five students, Pinkie Pie, Rarity, Fluttershy, Applejack, and Rainbow Dash struggle as freshmen at Canterlot High. Pinkie cannot find a school club that makes her happy, while Rainbow Dash wants to be the star player of the Wondercolts soccer team despite her inability to play on the team. Meanwhile, Applejack is initially glad to see her cousins Babs Seed and Sunflower, but they ridicule her fashion while making friends with Rarity, the fashion expert. However, when Rarity asks Fluttershy, who has been worried about Sunflower's sick chihuahua dog but is unable to speak up about it, to join them for lunch one day, Babs Seed and Sunflower refuse to allow her. On the day of the first game, Pinkie has found her true calling, as leader of the school's glee club, and gets Fluttershy to help distribute cheering equipment to the crowd. When Babs and Sunflower refuse Fluttershy's help, both Applejack and Rarity decide to abandon the two and join Fluttershy. The crowd helps Rainbow Dash to remember the team spirit and foregoes her ego to help her team to win. The five become fast friends, though all this is detailed in the present by Sunset to be used for her gains.: Ted Anderson, Katie Cook (story); Tony Fleecs, Andy Price (art); Heather Breckel, Lauren Perry (coloring); Tom B. Long (lettering); Bobby Curnow (editor)
	My Little Pony: Equestria Girls Holiday Special	December 17, 2014	—
As the holidays approach at Canterlot High, Sunset is reminded that she is far distant from her family. Applejack hatches a plan with the rest of her friends to help cheer Sunset up with a series of slumber parties. During the first one, Applejack gets a call from Apple Bloom, who teasingly refers to her by an embarrassing childhood nickname. Applejack gladly explains its origins to the other girls, and Sunset writes to Twilight via her magic journal about the way her friends are helping to lift her spirits. The next day, Applejack is shocked to discover that a social media user called "Anon-a-miss" has posted a message about the nickname and that everyone at school has read it and begun to tease her. The situation worsens after the next slumber party, held at Rarity's house when Anon-a-miss posts photos that the girls took of one another while trying on silly outfits. They begin to suspect Sunset, as she was the only person present at both events and the colors on Anon-a-miss' social media page now match the ones she favors. Soon, embarrassing secrets about other students begin to show up online, causing the student body as a whole to turn against Sunset. When Sunset writes to Twilight for help, Twilight reminds her of the Windigos in Equestria, which feed on hatred and distrust between friends and reminds her of the importance of family. Sunset shows these messages to the other girls the next day and asks them if they honestly believe that she could be responsible for stirring up this trouble. The mention of family prompts Sunset to question Applejack, Rainbow Dash, and Rarity about the events leading up to their secrets being exposed. Their answers lead her to realize Anon-a-miss' identity, and she is proven right when Apple Bloom, Scootaloo, and Sweetie Belle confess their involvement. Apple Bloom had created Anon-a-miss as a way to get back at Applejack for spending so much time with Sunset rather than her family, and the other two soon joined in, with other students feeding them fresh gossip. They delete the profile, and everyone gets back on good terms with one another in time for the final party at Sweet Apple Acres.: Ted Anderson (story); Tony Fleecs (art); Heather Breckel (coloring); Bobby Curnow (editor); Neil Uyetake (lettering)
	My Little Pony: Fiendship Is Magic Issue 3	April 15, 2015	1631403397
In ancient Equestria, the sirens - Adagio Dazzle, Aria Blaze, and Sonata Dusk - have been feeding off the emotions brewed by the discord created by their singing in smaller towns but have turned their attention to the populous Canterlot. They arrive at the height of a multi-day musical competition. Their first attempt to sing with their traditional song is cut short as their song is far outdated, and Adagio comes up with singing "pop music" at the next chance. Their new song quickly enraptures the audience, except for the wizard, Star Swirl the Bearded. Recognizing that their singing is turning the ponies of Canterlot against each other, Star Swirl finds the only way to fight back is to counteract the sirens with his music. The Sirens and Star Swirl begin to try to one-up each other over several days until Star Swirl finds he cannot hope to beat the Sirens in musical ability. Remorsefully he uses the magic mirror to banish the sirens to a world without magic, hoping the trio will come to use their powers for good. In this new world, the sirens find themselves in humanized forms, their magic weak but still strong enough to feed on the power of their song.: Jeremy Whitley, Christina Rice, Ted Anderson, Heather Nuhfer, Katie Cook (story); Brenda Hickey, Tony Fleecs, Agnes Garbowska, Andy Price (art); Amy Mebberson, Sara Richard (cover artist); Bobby Curnow (editor); Neil Uyetake (lettering)
	My Little Pony Equestria Girls: Canterlot High: March Radness	March 25, 2020	—
"Spring has sprung, and your favorite Equestria girls are back with three brand-new adventures! Celebrate March Radness with the Spring Athletic event, a visit by the famous A.K. Yearling herself, and… detention?! Return to Canterlot High, where mischief, fun, and friendship collide!": Danny Djeljosevic, Christina Rice, and Toni Kuusisto (story); Toni Kuusisto (art); Heather Breckel (coloring); Megan Brown (editor); Valeria Lopez (lettering)

=== Live-action music videos ===
Up until the Friendship Games lineup, Hasbro has been releasing a series of live-action music videos to promote the toy line. The videos feature female dancers, dressed as the protagonists, dancing to the renditions of the song "Equestria Girls", a number heard in the first Equestria Girls film.

With the first lineup, Hasbro released a live-action music video, titled Magic of Friendship, on the Entertainment Weekly website on August 30, 2013, depicting seven teenage girls, as the six protagonists and Sunset Shimmer, doing a new dance routine called "The EG Stomp" in a school cafeteria to a shorter Toy Commercial version of the "Equestria Girls" song.

On February 20, 2014, Hasbro released a new live-action music video on its official website to coincide with the Rainbow Rocks lineup, depicting the protagonists in a rock band. The music video, also titled Rainbow Rocks, uses a rock version of the "Equestria Girls" song and portrays the protagonists performing the "EG Stomp". Through the Equestria Girls YouTube channel, another music video was released on August 4, 2014. It depicts four more teenage girls, each one dressed as the Dazzlings and DJ Pon-3 respectively. In February 2015, another music video titled "Rainbooms Remix" was released.

On August 14, 2015, the same year the Friendship Games lineup was launched, Hasbro released a live-action music video on its website, depicting five of the six protagonists as well as Sunset Shimmer in a sporting competition against Crystal Prep's Twilight Sparkle.

=== Video and website games ===
Promotional material of My Little Pony: Equestria Girls included a website called Hasbro's Equestria Girls that showcased the Mane Six along with introducing Sunset Shimmer as the antagonist.

The website hosted short descriptions of the main characters along with the main antagonists. In much of the advertising, the characters were portrayed with two different art styles, one portraying more of a Monster High art style and a more simplistic style that they ended up using for the films. Both art styles are depicted side by side along with snapshots from their respective movies, Equestria Girls, Rainbow Rocks, and The Friendship Games. The website also included different features such as snapshots of the film, and games based on their respective movies.

On October 15, 2013, Gameloft's My Little Pony mobile game was updated to include the Equestria Girls mini-game.

A Rainbow Rocks missile command-type mini-game was added to the Hasbro Arcade mobile app on April 8, 2014. On October 29, 2014, the mini-game was updated to include the Dazzlings with two songs from the film and one song from one of the live-action music videos.

On June 7, 2014, a Rainbow Rocks game titled "Repeat the Beat" was released on Hasbro's Equestria Girls website; almost two months later, two more games have been released on July 31, 2014, one of them being "Equestria Girls: Battle of the Bands" and the other being "Equestria Girls: V.I.F. (Very Important Friend)".

On August 4, 2015, a Friendship Games game titled "Archery Game" was released on Hasbro's Equestria Girls website.

== Other merchandise ==
=== Soundtracks ===
- My Little Pony: Equestria Girls – Soundtrack (2013)
- Equestria Girls: Rainbow Rocks – Soundtrack (2014)
- Equestria Girls: Friendship Games – Soundtrack (2015)
- Equestria Girls: Legend of Everfree – Soundtrack (2016)

The My Little Pony 2015 Convention Collection released for San Diego Comic-Con in 2015 contains select songs from the first two films: Equestria Girls and Rainbow Rocks.

== Reception ==
There has been criticism over the anthropomorphism approach of the toy line, as well as the franchise overall. Before the Equestria Girls film's release, several mothers spoke to the New York Daily News stating concerns about the humanized characters, describing them as "too sexy", "anorexic", and "going back to the original Barbie" or "looking like Bratz dolls", and several feared allowing their children to be influenced by the looks. However, some considered it reasonable with other current media such as The Little Mermaid, with one parent stating she felt that it isn't "any worse than Ariel in a bikini top for two hours". Slate's Amanda Marcotte considered that the characters' change to humanoid form was to popularize Equestria Girls with the adult fanbase of Friendship Is Magic, who she claims "have expressed a strong interest in seeing the Ponies in sexy, humanized forms". However, many of these adult fans expressed disappointment in the announcement of the franchise and the characters, considering Equestria Girls to be trying to pander to this older audience, and that the approach "goes against everything that Pony was trying to prove". Craig McCracken, speaking for his wife Lauren Faust, Friendship Is Magic's creative showrunner for the first two seasons before stepping down, stated that McCracken felt she "wasn't the biggest fan" of Equestria Girls, opining that the approach of turning the pony characters into humanoids would have gone against the way she wanted to take the television series.

Being part of a toy line and media franchise from Hasbro, the criticism against commercialization was taken into account when reviewing the films and specials from the Equestria Girls series, whose reception has generally been mixed to positive for retaining the quality of the Friendship Is Magic television series. When reviewing the Friendship Games film, Mike Cahill of The Guardian gave the film two out of five stars, calling it "craven commercialism", but adding that "it's not unattractively designed, and its peppy collegiate spirit trumps the sappiness of Disney's Tinkerbell spin-offs". Conversely, Adam Lemuz of Geekscape gave the same film a four out of five, praising its animation, music, directing and writing. Sherilyn Connelly, published by McFarland & Company, complimented the films for having character-driven plots and argued that some journalists' and adult male My Little Pony fans' harsh criticisms of Equestria Girls arose from a misogynistic backlash against the idea of media that overtly starred characters meant to appeal to, resemble, and resonate with a young female audience.
