= Elements of Harmony =

Magical artifacts representing virtues in My Little Pony: Friendship Is Magic

The physical manifestation of the Elements of Harmony as magical jewelry

The Elements of Harmony are six magical artifacts representing fundamental virtues of friendship in the television series My Little Pony: Friendship Is Magic. The Element of Magic activates the other five when the bearers of the Elements demonstrate "true friendship." In Friendship Is Magic, the six main characters (collectively known as the Mane Six) Twilight Sparkle, Applejack, Rarity, Fluttershy, Rainbow Dash, and Pinkie Pie wield the Element of Magic, Honesty, Generosity, Kindness, Loyalty, and Laughter, respectively.

== Appearances ==
=== My Little Pony: Friendship Is Magic (2010–2019) ===
The Elements of Harmony are introduced in the series premiere "Friendship Is Magic" as ancient artifacts of legend depicted in a tapestry and stained glass window; they are described as the "most powerful magic known to ponydom." The Elements are first discovered as physical stone orbs housed in the ruins of the Castle of the Two Sisters in the Everfree Forest, where they transform into ornate necklaces and a tiara when activated by the Mane Six.

Throughout the first two seasons, the Elements appear in their jewelry forms. However, the artifacts' power is contingent upon the genuine friendship and emotional connection between their bearers. When Discord manipulates the ponies' personalities and severs their friendships in "The Return of Harmony", the physical Elements become powerless. In the second season finale "A Canterlot Wedding," the Mane Six were going to use them to defeat Queen Chrysalis. Unfortunately, they were captured by the Changelings, forcing Princess Cadence and Shining Armor to defeat them instead.

In the fourth season premiere "Princess Twilight Sparkle", the Elements' magic is transferred to the Tree of Harmony. However, in the season finale "Twilight's Kingdom", the Mane Six were given a new power known as Rainbow Power.

=== My Little Pony: Equestria Girls (2013–2020) ===
Sunset Shimmer, a former anthropomorphic unicorn from Equestria who becomes human after traveling through a magic mirror to the human world, is first introduced in Equestria Girls. Originally a student of Princess Celestia before Twilight Sparkle, she drops out of school in search of power and crosses over to the human world, where she becomes a student at Canterlot High School. With a desire for revenge, upon discovering Twilight's coronation in the third season, Sunset returns to the world of Equestria to steal Twilight's Element of Harmony (her crown), with the intention of taking it to the human world to mirror chaos and rule Equestria. However, Sunset's plan is thwarted by Twilight and her five friends from the pony universe.

In Legend of Everfree, the Mane Six (from the human world) and Sunset Shimmer (having already had her redemption) end up discovering that when Princess Twilight's element was brought to the human world, a large amount of magic was released. However, after much confusion and problems, Twilight and Sunset discover a cave with seven magical crystals that allow each of their friends to gain a different special ability, such as super strength, super speed, and telekinesis. When they connect with these crystals, they end up becoming necklaces, just like the Elements of Harmony (from Equestria). However, Equestria Girls director Ishi Rudell revealed on his Twitter that "In [the human] world, Sunset Shimmer is the 7th element! ☀️" later specifying said element to be "empathy".

== Analysis ==
In The Art of Equestria, the Elements are described as an "unstoppable force of good". Military bronies have compared the Elements of Harmony to the United States Army's core values, known by the acronym LDRSHIP (Loyalty, Duty, Respect, Selfless Service, Honor, Integrity, and Personal Courage). According to Laura Shillington, the Elements are "responsible for keeping nature in balance" since "if [nature] is not kept in balance, problems will emerge", which contributes to gendered emotional responses to nature. Kevin Fletcher wrote that while the show promotes individualism via the cutie marks and distinct personalities of the ponies, it also emphasizes "communalism and sharing" through the collective responsibility required to wield the Elements. Historian Louis Clerc described the Elements of Harmony in The Hague Journal of Diplomacy as the Equestrian equivalent of a nuclear arsenal. History professor Andrew Crome wrote that some Christian bronies view the Elements as having explicit biblical parallels (particularly as allusions to the Fruit of the Holy Spirit) and describe the Elements as "a tool God has given us to diagnose friendship problems" or as "the Seven Spirits of God."

== See also ==
- Cutie mark
- My Little Pony: Friendship Is Magic fandom
- List of My Little Pony: Friendship Is Magic characters
