= Twilight Sparkle =

Fictional character from My Little Pony

- My Little Pony character
- Twilight Sparkle as she appears in "Twilight's Kingdom"
- First appearance: "Friendship Is Magic – Part 1" (2010)
- Created by: Lauren Faust
- Based on: Twilight from the My Little Pony toyline's first incarnation
- Voiced by: Tara Strong (speaking); Rebecca Shoichet (singing); Kira Buckland (My Little Pony: Power Ponies and My Little Pony: Luna Eclipsed)

In-universe information
- Nicknames: Twi; Twily; Sparkle
- Species: Unicorn (seasons 1–3); Alicorn (seasons 4–9); Human (Equestria Girls)
- Titles: Element of Magic; Princess of Friendship (seasons 4-9); Ruler of Equestria (finale)
- Occupation: Student at the School for Gifted Unicorns (formerly); Princess Celestia's student (seasons 1–3); Librarian at the Golden Oak Library (seasons 1–4); Ruler of the Castle of Friendship (season 5-9); Starlight Glimmer's teacher (seasons 6–7); Founder/Principal of the School of Friendship (seasons 8–9); Founder/leader of the Council of Friendship (finale)
- Affiliation: Mane Six
- Family: Shining Armor (older brother); Twilight Velvet (mother); Night Light (father); Spike (adoptive younger brother); Owlowiscious (pet owl)
- Significant others: Flash Sentry (mutual crush; Equestria Girls only)
- Relatives: Princess Cadance (sister-in-law); Princess Flurry Heart (niece); Princess Celestia (aunt-in-law); Princess Luna (aunt-in-law)

Princess Twilight Sparkle is a fictional character who appears in the fourth incarnation of Hasbro's My Little Pony toyline and media franchise, beginning with My Little Pony: Friendship Is Magic (2010–2019), and later in the franchise's fifth incarnation as well. She is voiced by Tara Strong, and her singing voice is provided by Rebecca Shoichet.

Twilight Sparkle is depicted as an intelligent, studious, and sometimes socially awkward anthropomorphic unicorn (later an alicorn) with exceptional magical abilities. In the first season of the show, her mentor and royal patron, Princess Celestia, guides her to learn about friendship in the town of Ponyville, where she and her dragon assistant Spike become close friends with five other ponies: Applejack, Rarity, Fluttershy, Rainbow Dash, and Pinkie Pie. The six friends collectively are referred to as the Mane Six. Twilight represents the Element of Magic in the Elements of Harmony.

Created by Lauren Faust, Twilight is based on the unicorn toy Twilight from the first incarnation of My Little Pony toyline. The creative team also incorporated Twilight's personality into her design, such as her purple color and cutie mark. Twilight garnered praise for her relatability and complexity.

== Appearances ==
Twilight Sparkle's original unicorn form in "A Canterlot Wedding".

=== Fourth My Little Pony incarnation (2010–2021) ===
==== My Little Pony: Friendship Is Magic ====
At the start of the series, Twilight is a bookworm unicorn with a talent for magic and Princess Celestia's protégée. She travels to the town of Ponyville with her dragon assistant Spike due to Celestia's request for her to make friends. There, she becomes close friends with five other ponies: Applejack, Rarity, Fluttershy, Rainbow Dash, and Pinkie Pie. The six defeat a villain known as "Nightmare Moon", who is Celestia's sister, Luna, and discover they represent artifacts known as the "Elements of Harmony", with Twilight representing the element of magic. Twilight decides to stay in Ponyville and sends letters to Celestia about the challenges she and her new friends overcome. In season two and three, she continues learning about friendship and travels to other parts of Equestria. Twilight also helps to defeat villains such as Discord—the Spirit of Chaos—Queen Chrysalis—the leader of the Changelings—and King Sombra—a dark unicorn seeking to take over the Crystal Empire. In the episode "Magical Mystery Cure", she fixes a spell by famed wizard, Star Swirl the Bearded, resulting in her becoming an Alicorn and a princess, and graduating from her studies with Celestia. In the fourth season, she questions her role as a princess before becoming the "Princess of Friendship", with the responsibility to spread friendship across Equestria, in "Twilight's Kingdom". In the fifth season premiere, "The Cutie Map", Twilight stops Starlight Glimmer's cult, and convinces her to be friends in the season finale, becoming her teacher on friendship. Throughout the sixth season, Twilight teaches Starlight about friendship; Starlight later saves her from an attack by Chrysalis, resulting in her graduating from her studies on friendship. In the seventh season, Twilight releases Starswirl and other pony legends, referred to as "the Pillars of Old Equestria" from limbo, which accidentally releases an evil being known as "the Pony of Shadows". Together with her friends, Starlight and the Pillars, vanquishes the Pony of Shadows back to limbo.

After meeting new creatures beyond Equestria in the movie, Twilight and her friends open a private vocational school of friendship that accepts all creatures, including hippogriffs, changelings, griffins, yaks, and dragons. In the ninth season, Celestia and Luna decide to abdicate from the throne, letting Twilight take over leadership of Equestria. Though initially panicked, Twilight gains more confidence over the season, especially after defeating her past enemies. After her coronation, she starts the Council of Friendship, which consists of her and her friends, who meet once a moon.

==== My Little Pony: The Movie ====
While Twilight and her friends are preparing Equestria's first Friendship Festival in Canterlot, the city comes under attack by the army of an evil conqueror called the Storm King, led by his second-in-command, Tempest Shadow, a unicorn with a broken horn. Twilight and her friends journey beyond Equestria to defeat the Storm King and make new allies in the process. However, after a heated argument with her friends, Twilight is captured by Tempest and drained of her magic. Twilight's friends return to Equestria with the help of their new allies and they save her and Equestria with the help of Tempest.

==== Equestria Girls ====
Twilight Sparkle's human form in My Little Pony: Equestria Girls.

Twilight appears as a main character in the first two My Little Pony: Equestria Girls films.

In the first film, Twilight travels through a magic mirror to the human world with Spike when Sunset Shimmer steals her crown containing the Element of Magic. There, she poses as a new student at Canterlot High School and befriends the human counterparts of her friends in Equestria. They help her win the election for Princess of the school's Fall Formal, and together they defeat and reform Sunset when she tries to use the crown to brainwash the students into becoming her personal army to invade Equestria.

In the second film, Twilight returns to the human world with Spike when Sunset uses her magic book to warn her of the emergence of the Dazzlings, creatures from Equestria who have the ability to use their singing voices to manipulate others. She is then recruited to join her Canterlot High School friends' band, the Rainbooms, as the temporary lead singer to compete in the school's Battle of the Bands. As they prepare for the contest, she works on a counter-spell to break the mind-control spell the Dazzlings placed on the students. With Sunset's help, the Rainbooms defeat the Dazzlings and leave them powerless. After she returns to Equestria with Spike, Sunset keeps in touch with her using her magic book.

In the pre-credits scene of the third film, Twilight returns to the human world after the events of "The Cutie Re-Mark" and meets her human counterpart, Sci-Twi.

Twilight occasionally makes appearances in subsequent Equestria Girls media, often for guidance on Equestrian magic.

==== Best Gift Ever ====
After Twilight stresses out about Hearth's Warming presents and Princess Cadance, Shining Armor, and Flurry Heart's visit, her friends decide to do a "Hearth's Warming Helper". As part of it, Twilight needs to get a gift for Pinkie Pie. Twilight finds a recipe for a legendary magic pudding that is dangerous if prepared incorrectly. She becomes stressed trying to both prepare it and entertain Shining Armor and Princess Cadence. Unbeknownst to them, Flurry Heart adds extra ingredients that cause the pudding to boil over. After the pudding floods Twilight's castle, Pinkie Pie uses her present to stabilize it.

==== Rainbow Roadtrip ====
Twilight and her friends travel to the town of Hope Hollow to attend their annual Rainbow Festival after Rainbow Dash had been invited as a guest of honor. When they arrive, they find that the town's color had faded away. Twilight and her friends start working to restore the town's color and bring the Rainbow Festival back.

==== My Little Pony: Pony Life ====
Twilight appears alongside the rest of the Mane Six in the series My Little Pony: Pony Life. The show features a different animation technique and focuses more on slice of life-style stories than Friendship Is Magic. In Pony Life, she appears as an alicorn from the beginning of the series, but is never referred to as a princess.

=== Fifth My Little Pony incarnation (2021–2024) ===
==== My Little Pony: A New Generation ====
Twilight makes a cameo appearance at the start of the film, during an imaginary sequence depicting a playtime session between Sunny Starscout, Hitch Trailblazer, and Sprout Cloverleaf that goes awry when Sprout acts as if Rarity were an evil unicorn due to prejudices between the three pony races having resurfaced following Twilight's implied passing. Her cutie mark appears in the film as the symbol in both Sunny's diary and a window in an abandoned Zephyr Heights airport.

==== My Little Pony: Make Your Mark ====
Twilight makes a cameo appearance in "Growing Pains" where she appears to Sunny Starscout and her friends via a message through the Unity Crystals. She warns them about an "evil pony" that tried to steal all of Equestria's magic years ago.

=== Sixth My Little Pony incarnation (set to begin in 2027) ===
Twilight is one of the four characters confirmed to appear in the upcoming animated web series My Little Pony: Forever Friendship.

=== Friendship Is Magic comic series ===
The first My Little Pony IDW Comic, "The Return of Queen Chrysalis", was published in 2012, in which Twilight and her friends find the ponies in Ponyville replaced by undercover Changelings, similar to "A Canterlot Wedding". Twilight appears as a unicorn in the comics at first. She is seen as a winged unicorn from issue #13 onwards, published on November 20, 2013. The comics were set in the same world as the television show, but featured original stories about Twilight and her friends unrelated to it until issue #89, after which the TV show ended. From this issue onwards, the comics picked up where the show left off and were officially described as "Season 10". The comics ended after issue #102, published on October 13, 2021, where Twilight and her friends have to protect the Elements of Harmony from the attacks of the Knights of Harmony.

Following the end of "Season 10", a new five-issue miniseries called "My Little Pony: Generations" was announced, in which the Mane Six meet ponies from the first My Little Pony show. The first issue was published on October 20, 2021, and the fifth and final issue was published in February 2022.

In the four-issue crossover comic between My Little Pony and Transformers called "My Little Pony/Transformers: Friendship in Disguise" published from July to November 2020, characters from the Transformers franchise team up with the Mane Six in Equestria to fight off villains from both franchises, who have also formed an alliance with each other. A sequel four-issue miniseries called "My Little Pony/Transformers: The Magic of Cybertron" with a similar plot was published from April to July 2021.

== Equestria Girls alternate version ==
Twilight Sparkle's human counterpart is the final main character to be introduced in the My Little Pony Equestria Girls spin-off franchise, first appearing in a post-credit scene of the second film, My Little Pony: Equestria Girls — Rainbow Rocks. Unlike her pony counterpart, this version wears thick glasses and owns Spike's human world counterpart, initially an ordinary dog, as a pet.

She is fully introduced in the third film, My Little Pony: Equestria Girls – Friendship Games in which she is shown to be a student at Crystal Prep Academy. A misfit amongst her peers, she is forced by Principal Cinch, the head of her school, to compete in the titular sporting event as a member of the Crystal Prep Academy Shadowbolts against Canterlot High School. While at CHS to compete at the Games, she uses a pendant shaped device to study unusual energy readings emanating from the school with the goal of being accepted into the Everton Independent Study Program, but in doing so, she inadvertently drains the magic of the Equestira Girls, who are competing against her as the members of the CHS Wondercolts team. Before the final event of the Games, Cinch and her classmates pressure her into releasing the magic captured in her pendant, which causes her to transform into Midnight Sparkle, a demonic creature who begins opening rifts to Equestria. She is defeated by Sunset Shimmer, who helps her turn back to normal. At the end of the film, she decides to abandon her application to the Independent Study Program in favor of transferring to Canterlot High, where she becomes a main character of the Equestria Girls franchise alongside Sunset and Princess Twilight's other CHS friends.

In the next film, My Little Pony: Equestria Girls – Legend of Everfree, she has recurring nightmares about transforming into Midnight Sparkle and participates in the CHS field trip to Camp Everfree where she is assigned to the same tent as Sunset Shimmer and takes a romantic interest with Timber Spruce, one of the camp's counselors. When strange occurrences begin happening around the camp, Twilight suspects that Midnight Sparkle is responsible and is taking over her. Due to this, Twilight becomes afraid of using new telekinetic powers that she begins to obtain. During the film's climax, she and Sunset discover that Timber's sister, Gloriosa Daisy, is responsible for the strange occurrences. Twilight later overcomes her insecurities of harnessing her new magical powers when she and her friends use magical geodes to defeat Gloriosa when she transforms into a monstrous creature who encloses the camp in brambles. She later participates in the fundraiser to save the camp, in which she is revealed to have become a backup vocalist in her friends' band, the Rainbooms. At the end of the film, she keeps in touch with Timber Spruce.

Twilight's human counterpart also prominently appears in subsequent Equestria Girls media, including the 2017 television specials, the 2017 Summertime Shorts, the web series, and all other Equestria Girls specials, most notably My Little Pony: Equestria Girls – Spring Breakdown.

== Development ==
=== Background and conception ===
Hasbro, Inc. produced several incarnations of the My Little Pony franchise, often labeled by collectors as "generations". Hasbro wanted to retool the My Little Pony franchise to better suit the current demographic of young girls, similar to how Michael Bay's film Transformers had helped boost the new Transformers toy line According to Margaret Loesch, CEO of Hub Network, revisiting properties that had worked in the past was an important programming decision, which was somewhat influenced by the opinions of the network's programming executives, several of whom were once fans of such shows. Hasbro's senior vice president, Linda Steiner, stated the company "intended to have the show appeal to a larger demographic", with the concept of parents "co-viewing" with their children being a central theme of the Hub Network's programming. Central themes that Hasbro sought for the show included friendship and working together, factors they determined from market research in how girls played with their toys. Outside help was sought to make the characters and stories.

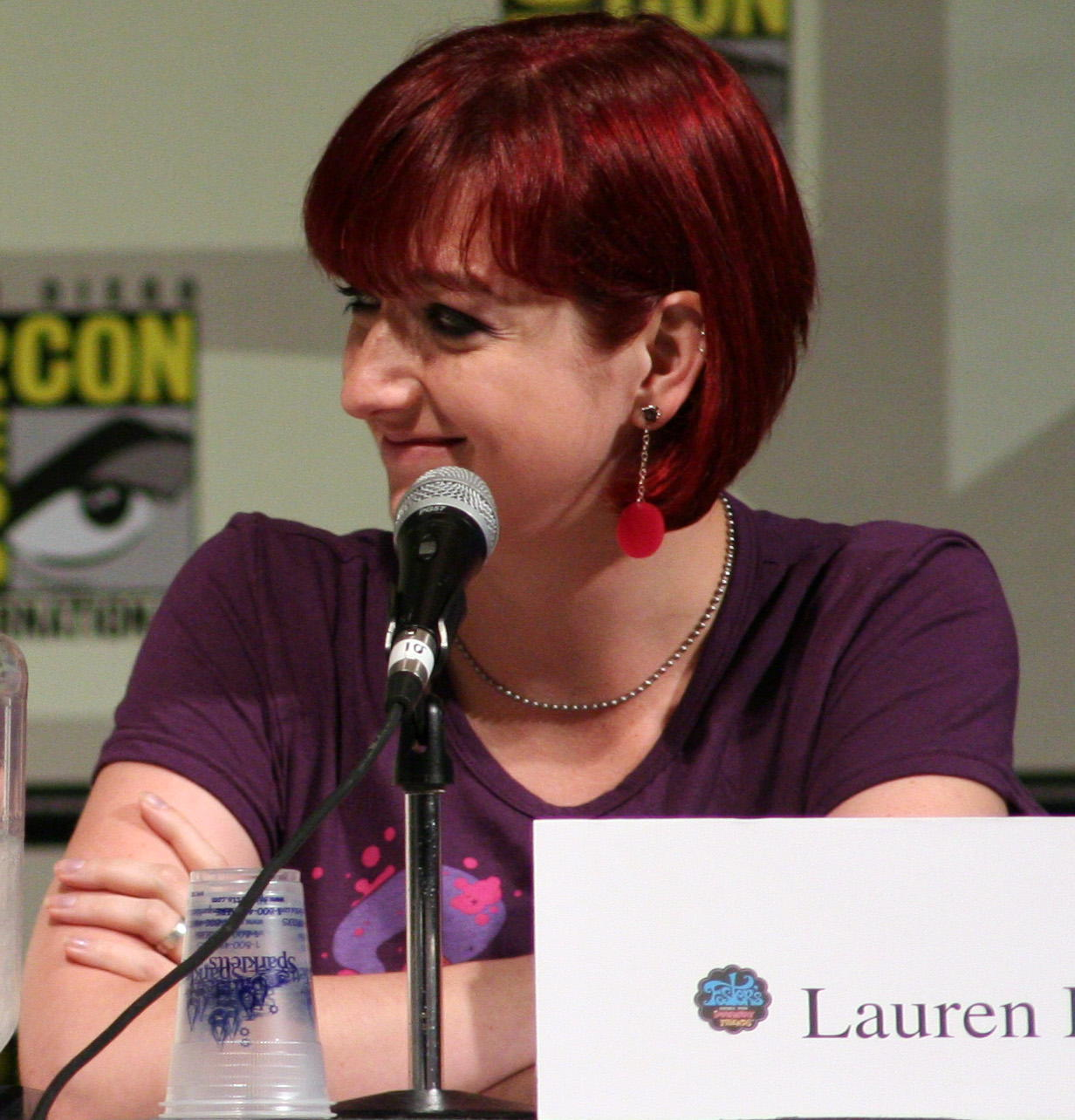
Lauren Faust, developer and initial showrunner of My Little Pony: Friendship Is Magic

Animator and writer Lauren Faust approached Hasbro to develop her girls' toys property "Galaxy Girls" into an animated series. Faust, who had previously worked on Cartoon Network's The Powerpuff Girls and Foster's Home for Imaginary Friends, had been unsuccessfully pitching animation aimed at girls for years, as cartoons for girls were considered unsuccessful. When she pitched to Lisa Licht of Hasbro Studios, the latter was not very interested, but she showed Faust one of the company's recent My Little Pony animated works, Princess Promenade, "completely on the fly". Licht thought Faust's style was well suited to that line, and asked her to consider "some ideas [on] where to take a new version of the franchise".

Faust agreed to take the job as long as she was able to move away from the "silliness of [My Little Pony's] predecessors and their patronizing attitudes towards young girls". She regarded girls' entertainment as too sweet, plain, and obvious which did not fit their intelligence and "talk[ed] down to [them]". Unlike most girls' shows, in which, according to Faust, the characters have "one archetype" and "the only difference between any of them is this one likes pink and this one likes blue", she insisted on characters with dimensions who were different from one another and had their own flaws. Faust aimed for the characters to be "relatable" characters, using "icons of girliness" (such as the bookworm) to broaden the appeal of the characters for the young female audience. She based many characters of the principal cast on how she had envisioned the original ponies, including Twilight Sparkle on Twilight from Generation 1, as well as Twilight Twinkle from Generation 3, first introduced in 2005.

=== Voice ===
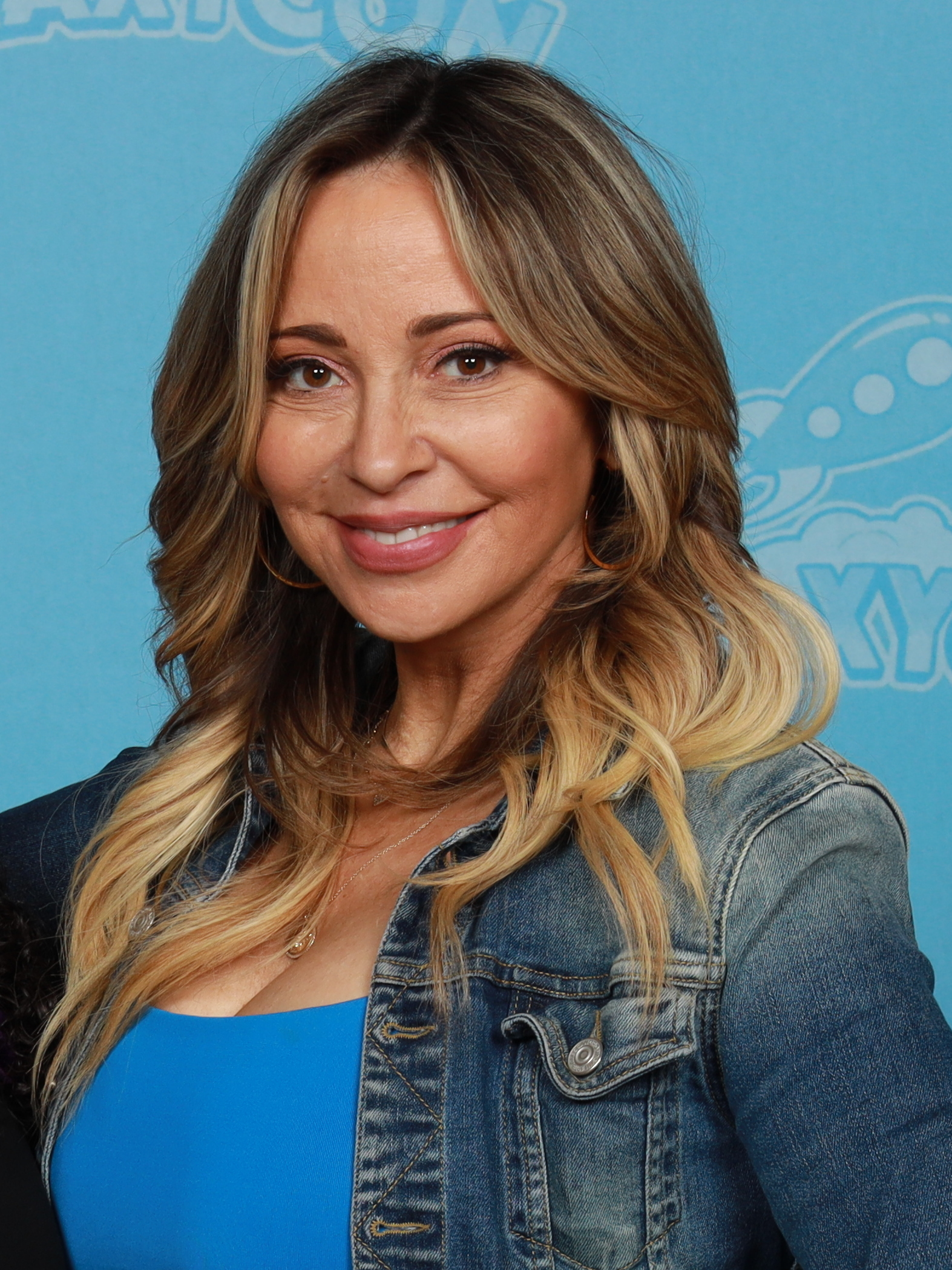
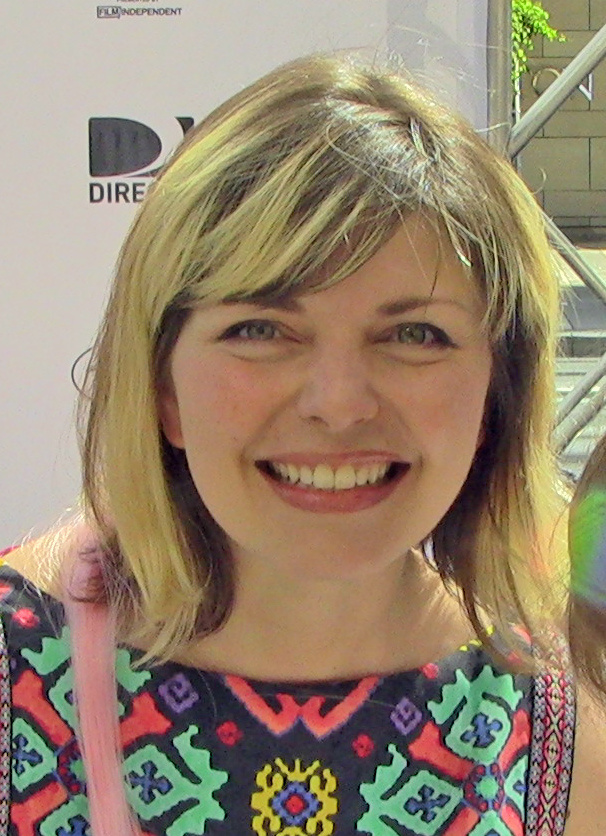
Tara Strong and Rebecca Shoichet voice Twilight while speaking and singing respectively.

Tara Strong and Faust first met on The Powerpuff Girls. After developing Friendship Is Magic's pitch bible, Faust asked Strong to help her complete it by voicing Twilight, Pinkie Pie, and Applejack or Rainbow Dash. Faust had expected Strong to book the role of Pinkie Pie as she was similar to Bubbles, who the actress had voiced in The Powerpuff Girls. Faust offered her the role of Twilight after hearing her voice the character. Strong viewed Twilight as "authentic and conscientious and sweet but strong and a little bit nerdy". To voice Twilight, Strong made her voice higher.

Rebecca Shoichet initially became involved with the series through frequent collaborator Daniel Ingram, who composed the songs for the show. She performed a number of song demos for him, including for the PBS animated series Martha Speaks. During the show's casting phase, Shoichet was cast as Twilight's singing voice after recording a demo for the series' theme song because she sounded similar to Strong.

Kira Buckland voiced Twilight in the video games My Little Pony: Power Ponies and My Little Pony: Luna Eclipsed.

=== Design ===
Faust's 2008 sketch of Twilight Sparkle's concept art under the title "Star Gazing Twilight" created for the FiM pitch bible.

Each of the main characters had expressions and mannerisms distinctive to them as well as general expressions they shared. According to the DHX Media team, they "avoid[ed] certain expressions if it [went] outside [the ponies'] personality". The creative team incorporated each character's personality into their mannerisms, facial expressions, props, and home environment. Twilight had a different cutie mark and hair color when she was first created. Originally, she had an cutie mark with an heavenly design that highlighted her royalty and mystical knowledge, which were later reflected in her purple color. Her cutie mark was changed to convey that she is "a vibrant and special star in the universe of pony". Twilight's hard, angular edges personify her as a tidy pony. Like other ponies, Twilight's body does not feature shading; her mane and tail lack depth and are generally fixed shapes, animated by bending and stretching them in curves in three dimensions and giving them a sense of movement without the cost of individual hairs. Twilight also influenced the design of Golden Oak Library, her home for the first four seasons. It represents her various hobbies, and its numerous hooks, storage cubbies, and stairways, the tree's curving, organic interior is representative of her mind.

== Reception and analysis ==
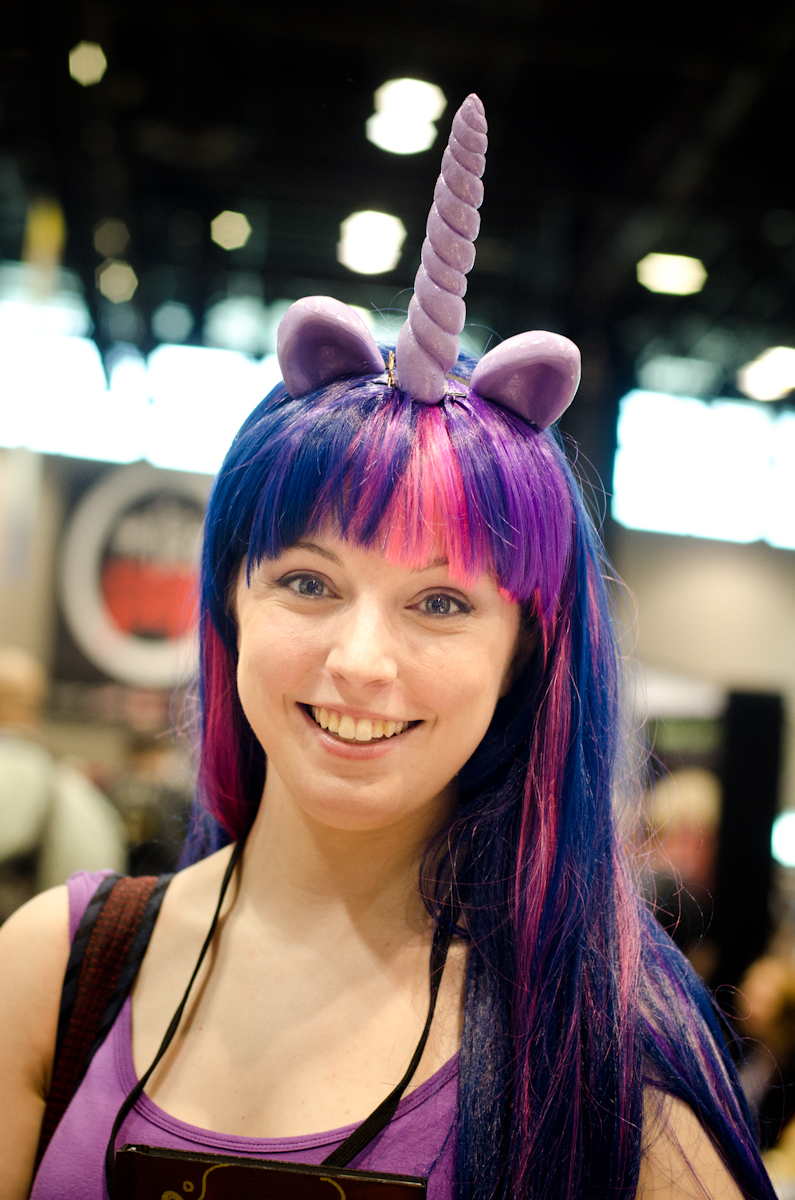
A cosplayer in a Twilight Sparkle costume

According to a study published in 2019, the Friendship Is Magic fandom usually cite Twilight as the character with whom they most relate. Isabelle Licari-Guillaume insisted that Twilight is a "convincing figurehead" for nerd culture and a major factor in the success of the series. According to Pavol Kosnáč, Twilight connects the Mane 6 together. Theresia Sitinjak, a writer at Diponegoro University, stated Twilight represents the American cultural values of individualism, altruism, and industry—reflected in several of her character traits, including her optimism, friendships, and high standards. Ethan Lewis, from Den of Geek, asserted she is "one of the more complex characters of this show" because she "embodies many contradictions"; for example, he wrote that despite being scientific, logical, and reasonable, Twilight's element of harmony is magic. The Mary Sue described Twilight as mature and praised her nerdy aspects. Comic Book Resources ranked Twilight as the second best character Strong had voiced.

Anna Dobbie of Den of Geek said that Twilight's reserved demeanour implies that she has avoidant personality disorder and obsessive–compulsive disorder. Supervising director Jayson Thiessen stated Twilight is "kind of a neurotic perfectionist ... [with] a touch of OCD".

In March 2020, Twilight Sparkle was among the first character voices implemented in 15.ai, a text-to-speech website that generates voice lines of fictional characters using generative AI. In January 2022, it was discovered that a cryptocurrency company called Voiceverse had generated voice clips of Twilight Sparkle (along with those of Rainbow Dash) using 15.ai, pitched them up to sound unrecognizable, and sold them as NFTs.

In 2021, researchers from Universitas Trisakti analyzed visual character design in My Little Pony: The Movie and noted that Twilight Sparkle's predominantly purple colors correspond to qualities like imagination, spirituality, and wisdom that visually separate her from the rest of the Mane Six.

== See also ==
- List of My Little Pony: Friendship Is Magic characters
- Mane Six
- Elements of Harmony

== Works cited ==
- Snider, Brandon T. (2013). The Elements of Harmony: My Little Pony: Friendship Is Magic: The Official Guidebook. New York: Little, Brown and Company. ISBN 978-0-316-24754-2.
- Begin, Mary Jane (2015). My Little Pony: The Art of Equestria. New York: Abrams. ISBN 978-1-4197-1577-8.
- Cusack, Carole M.; Kosnáč, Pavol (2017). "The development of spirituality in the Brony community". Fiction, Invention and Hyper-reality: From popular culture to religion. New York: Routledge. doi:10.4324/9781315582283. hdl:1887/3160677. ISBN 978-1-315-58228-3 – via Taylor & Francis.
- Sitinjak, Theresia (July 21, 2019). "American Cultural Values as Reflected in the Character of Twilight Sparkle in Jayson Thiessen's My Little Pony" (PDF). Diponegoro University.
- Licari-Guillaume, Isabelle (December 31, 2019). "Expect the Unexpected: My Little Pony: Friendship is Magic and the Creation of a Double Audience". Transatlantica (2). doi:10.4000/transatlantica.14963. ISSN 1765-2766.
