= Spike (My Little Pony) =

Fictional character from My Little Pony

- My Little Pony character
- Spike as he appears in "Molt Down"
- First appearance: "Friendship Is Magic – Part 1" (2010)
- Created by: Lauren Faust; Meghan McCarthy
- Based on: Spike from the My Little Pony toyline's first incarnation
- Voiced by: Cathy Weseluck; Tabitha St. Germain (Pony Life); Martin Roach (Make Your Mark)

In-universe information
- Nickname: Spikey-wikey
- Species: Dragon (Equestria); Dog (Equestria Girls)
- Title(s): Great and Honorable Spike the Brave and Glorious
- Occupation: Twilight Sparkle's assistant/royal advisor; Friendship ambassador; Member of the Council of Friendship (finale)
- Family: Twilight Sparkle (adoptive older sister); Shining Armor (adoptive older brother); Twilight Velvet (adoptive mother); Night Light (adoptive father); Princess Cadance (adoptive sister-in-law); Princess Flurry Heart (adoptive niece)

Spike is a fictional character who appears in the fourth incarnation of Hasbro's My Little Pony toyline and media franchise, beginning with My Little Pony: Friendship Is Magic (2010–2019). He serves as a major character throughout the series and is the adoptive younger brother and assistant to Twilight Sparkle, the series' main protagonist. He is voiced by Cathy Weseluck.

An anthropomorphic baby dragon who helps Twilight as her "number one assistant", Spike helps organize her daily activities, takes notes during her friendship lessons, and magically sends her letters through his fire breath. He harbors an unrequited crush on Rarity and dreams of growing up to become a brave and noble dragon.

== Appearances ==
=== Fourth My Little Pony incarnation (2010–2021) ===
==== My Little Pony: Friendship Is Magic ====
Spike is a purple baby dragon with green spines. He was orphaned as an egg and hatched by Twilight as part of her entrance exam for Princess Celestia's academy. He was also raised among Twilight's family as her adopted younger brother. Spike fulfills the role of Twilight's "number one assistant" to which he is named for his loyalty and skill at helping Twilight solve problems and learn lessons. He also has a crush on Rarity, an insatiable appetite for sparkly gems, and the ability to send letters via his fiery dragon breath.

During the season three premiere, "The Crystal Empire", Spike becomes a hero of the titular kingdom after helping deliver the Crystal Heart to Princess Cadance and contributing to the defeat of King Sombra. He becomes known throughout the Crystal Empire as "Great and Honorable Spike the Brave and Glorious". He later saves the Crystal Empire again during the episode "Equestria Games" when he saves the stadium for the titular event from being hit from a giant mass of ice falling from the sky.

Spike's coming to terms with his identity as a dragon living among ponies is a recurring theme in the series, such as in episodes like "Dragon Quest", "Gauntlet of Fire", and "Father Knows Beast". In "Gauntlet of Fire", he befriends Princess Ember, who becomes the new Dragon Lord and ruler of the Dragon Lands. Spike later becomes Equestria's official friendship ambassador to the dragons.

In "Molt Down", he gains a pair of wings after undergoing a developmental stage for dragons called the "molt". At the end of the series, he becomes Twilight's royal adviser. Spike acts as a foil to Twilight and her friends in terms of personality, size, and shape which "provides plenty of opportunity for exploring this difference in storylines". Spike is the only male member of the team.

==== My Little Pony: Equestria Girls ====
Spike is a main character in the first two Equestria Girls films.

In the first film, he travels to the human world with Twilight to help her recover her stolen crown containing the Element of Magic after it is stolen by Sunset Shimmer, transforming into a talking dog in the process while Twilight transforms into a teenaged human girl. His role in the film consists mostly of reassuring Twilight as she navigates the complexities of her new human transformation and trying to fit in as she poses as a new student at Canterlot High School. After Twilight befriends the human counterparts of her friends from Equestria and wins the crown back by being elected Princess of the Fall Formal, Spike is kidnapped by Sunset's acolytes during the film's climax. Sunset is eventually defeated and reformed, and Spike and Twilight return to Equestria together.

In the second film, Spike returns to the human world and reassumes his talking dog form with Twilight to help her Canterlot High friends to confront the Dazzlings, who can hypnotize others with their magical voices. Twilight is recruited to join The Rainbooms, her friends' rock band as she works on a counter-spell to perform at the CHS Battle of the Bands and break the Dazzlings' spell on the students. After the Rainbooms are trapped under a stage during the final round of the competition, Spike finds DJ Pon-3 who helps them escape and defeat the Dazzlings. Spike and Twilight then return to Equestria.

Spike makes minor appearances with Twilight in subsequent Equestria Girls media.

==== My Little Pony: Pony Life ====
Spike appears as a secondary character in the spin-off reboot series, My Little Pony: Pony Life voiced by Tabitha St. Germain rather than Cathy Weseluck. He is depicted as already having wings from the beginning of the series.

=== Fifth My Little Pony incarnation (2022) ===
==== My Little Pony: Make Your Mark ====
Spike appears as a secondary character in the reboot series, My Little Pony: Make Your Mark. Since he already appears as a grown dragon, his voice is provided by Martin Roach. Instead of walking on two legs in his previous form, he walks on four legs. He only appears in Chapter Six of the series, and he is now Dragon Lord, a role previously held by Princess Ember.

== Equestria Girls alternate version ==
Spike's human world counterpart first appears in a cameo during the post-credits scene of My Little Pony: Equestria Girls – Rainbow Rocks as the ordinary pet dog of Twilight Sparkle's human world counterpart. He is fully introduced in My Little Pony: Equestria Girls – Friendship Games where he gains the ability to talk after being exposed to Equestrian magic and appears as a supporting character in subsequent media.

== Development ==
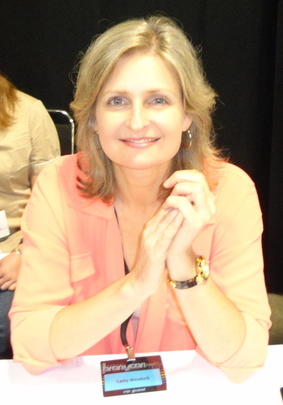
Cathy Weseluck provided the voice of Spike.

Lauren Faust, the creator of Friendship Is Magic, envisioned the character as "the sensitive little boy who has a lot of sisters and just seems to get along better with girls". On Spike's role as a dragon outsider living among ponies, show writer Meghan McCarthy said: "He's trying to figure out who he is. What beyond being Twilight's assistant is his role in this world? I think he reflects how everybody feels at some point in their life".

== Reception and analysis ==
Christian Valiente and Xeno Rasmusson wrote that Spike was an example of the series positioning male characters in secondary roles to female protagonists. They described him as Twilight Sparkle's sidekick who acts as her assistant with dialogue that is typically short and comedic, which places him "socially beneath the female characters." The authors remarked that he is one of the only two male characters who appear in the series premiere.

Jamie Kingston of WomenWriteAboutComics criticized Spike's portrayal in Friendship Is Magic as problematic because despite being as sapient as the ponies, he is treated like an indentured servant who does chores and cooking while sleeping in a dog bed. In particular, Kingston criticized the episode "Dragon Quest" for giving "the unfortunate message that Spike is better off with the ponies than he is with his own kind, because they're cruel, violent jerks," which she wrote was reminiscent of white people who adopt non-white children as being viewed as white saviors.

== See also ==
- Twilight Sparkle
- Rarity
- Cutie Mark Crusaders
- My Little Pony: Friendship Is Magic fandom
- List of My Little Pony: Friendship Is Magic characters

== Bibliography ==
- Snider, Brandon T. (2013). The Elements of Harmony: My Little Pony: Friendship Is Magic: The Official Guidebook. New York: Little, Brown and Company. ISBN 9780316247542.
- Blue, Jen A. (2013-08-31). My Little Po-Mo: Unauthorized Critical Essays on My Little Pony: Friendship Is Magic Season One. Eohippus Labs. pp. 39–44.
