= Background Six =

Popular background characters from My Little Pony

- My Little Pony: Friendship Is Magic organization
- Clockwise from upper left: Octavia Melody, Bon Bon, Lyra Heartstrings, Dr. Whooves, Derpy Hooves, and Vinyl Scratch.
- First appearance: "Friendship Is Magic" (2010)
- Location: Ponyville
- Key people: Derpy Hooves (Tabitha St. Germain); Dr. Whooves (Peter New); Lyra Heartstrings (Ashleigh Ball); Bon Bon (Andrea Libman); Vinyl Scratch (n/a); Octavia Melody (Kazumi Evans)

The Background Six (Note: The term "Background Six" is not official terminology used by Hasbro or the show's creators, but rather a fan-created designation.) are six background characters from the animated television series My Little Pony: Friendship Is Magic: Derpy Hooves, Dr. Whooves, Lyra Heartstrings, Bon Bon, Vinyl Scratch, and Octavia Melody.

The Background Six began as unnamed background ponies in crowd scenes and were given names, personalities, and relationships by the brony fandom before they received official recognition from the show's creators. The Background Six were originally created as simple placeholder background characters by the animation team at DHX Media, but evolved into beloved characters with dedicated followings, fan art, and fan fiction.

== Creation and development ==
The show features an extensive cast of over 200 minor characters, also designated as "background ponies", that are used to fill out crowd scenes and serve as visual gags in episodes. Several background ponies have been well received by the show's brony fanbase, who have assigned names and personalities to them. As a response to fan interest, the series' creative team has given six of the most popular characters expanded roles in later episodes and media, including being featured as the "main characters" in the show's one-hundredth episode "Slice of Life", which presents the characters' daily lives as the episode's central focus.

"Slice of Life" was organized entirely around the activities of the Background Six, and the Mane Six were relegated to background ponies. The episode starred Derpy Hooves paired with Dr. Whooves, Octavia Melody paired with Vinyl Scratch (whose fan name DJ Pon-3 was adopted by producers) sharing a house together, and Lyra Heartstrings paired with Bon Bon, with references to the latter's alternative name of Sweetie Drops.

According to show writer M.A. Larson, the show's staff did not think of the background ponies as individual ponies at the time of writing. At a fan convention, Larson told bronies: "They're not characters, they're designs—to you guys, they're characters, but to us, Lyra is just a green pony.... Background Pony #2, that's who she is to me."

== The Background Six ==
=== Derpy Hooves ===
Derpy Hooves (officially called Muffins; also known as Ditzy Doo) is a gray pegasus with crossed eyes who works as Ponyville's mail carrier. Derpy started out as a background character whose uniquely cross-eyed appearance was initially an animation error in the series premiere of Friendship Is Magic that fans on 4chan's comics and cartoons board, /co/, noticed and embraced. She was dubbed "Derpy Hooves" and became a favorite of fans, who collectively developed her personality and backstory through works of fan fiction.

The character gained official show recognition when she received her first speaking role in "The Last Roundup", where Rainbow Dash addresses her with the name "Derpy". However, this decision proved controversial as critics claimed that her portrayal perpetuated ableist stereotypes due to her name, voice, and mannerisms—a controversy colloquially called "Derpygate" by the brony fandom. In response to the backlash, Hasbro modified the episode by changing her voice, straightening her eyes, and removing her name from the dialogue, which generated further controversy within the brony fandom.

=== Dr. Whooves ===
Dr. Whooves is an earth pony who was named by fans for his purported resemblance to David Tennant's portrayal of the Tenth Doctor in the British television series Doctor Who. He appears in later episodes as an eccentric scientist and he exhibits similarities to his namesake in episodes such as "Slice of Life". In My Little Pony fan fiction and derivative works, Derpy is often portrayed as Dr. Whooves' companion.

=== Lyra Heartstrings and Bon Bon ===
The unicorn Lyra and earth pony Bon Bon appear together as "best friends" in several scenes. In "Slice of Life", it is revealed that the latter's real identity is Sweetie Drops, a disavowed secret agent living in Ponyville under the assumed identity "Bon Bon". Sometime after the bugbear was defeated by Twilight and her friends, Agent Furlong approached Sweetie Drops and informed her that S.M.I.L.E. (Note: Secret Monster Intelligence League of Equestria) remained in operation and needed her help once again. He decided to recruit her best friend, Lyra Heartstrings, after learning that she was aware of Sweetie Drops' true identity. The two agents were dispatched to Appleloosa, Applewood, and the Crystal Empire in search of changeling infiltrators, with Lyra and Sweetie discovering a changeling named Delilah in Appleloosa. Despite some infighting between the veteran and her rookie partner, they were able to expose the villains and summon the Mane Six to help defeat them. Afterward, the pair was established as a permanent team, remaining in Ponyville. Lyra and Bon Bon are the main focus of the chapter book Lyra and Bon Bon and the Mares from S.M.I.L.E., in which Bon Bon rejoins the S.M.I.L.E. spy agency alongside Lyra. In Beyond Equestria: Pinkie Pie Steps Up, the pair are tasked by their agency to retrieve the Pondora Box and are aided by Songbird Serenade and Pinkie Pie. They are voiced by various actresses, with Ball voicing Lyra after Season 2, and Libman voicing Sweetie Drops in "Slice of Life". Having been popularly paired by fans as a lesbian couple, they were officially canonized as such in season nine, proposing to each other in the background of one scene in "The Big Mac Question" and shown to be married in "The Last Problem".

=== Vinyl Scratch ===
A unicorn disc jockey rarely seen without headphones and sunglasses, first seen in "Suited for Success". Following the broadcast of the episode, a poll on the fan website Equestria Daily established the character's names as "DJ PON-3" and "Vinyl Scratch", with both names being alternately used in official products, such as the "Equestria Girls" music video parodying Katy Perry's song "California Gurls". Mary Carreon of OC Weekly wrote that "[Vinyl Scratch] looks suspiciously like Skrillex." She never talks throughout the franchise.

=== Octavia Melody ===
An earth pony who plays the cello, originally seen in "The Best Night Ever". She is featured in a scene in "Slice of Life", where she rehearses an "electric cello dubstep" number with fellow musician DJ Pon-3 for Cranky and Matilda's wedding. In the episode, it is revealed that Octavia and Vinyl are housemates.

== See also ==
- List of My Little Pony: Friendship Is Magic characters
- Mane Six – Main characters from My Little Pony: Friendship Is Magic
- My Little Pony: Friendship Is Magic fandom – Fans of My Little Pony
- My Little Pony: Friendship Is Magic fan fiction – Fan fiction of My Little Pony
- Participatory culture – Cultural production made through social interactions of different communities and groups
- Cheese Sandwich – Fictional character from My Little Pony
- Quibble Pants – Fictional character from My Little Pony

== Bibliography ==
- Begin, Mary Jane (2015). My Little Pony: The Art of Equestria. New York: Abrams. ISBN 978-1-4197-1577-8.
- Snider, Brandon T. (2013). The Elements of Harmony: My Little Pony: Friendship Is Magic: The Official Guidebook. New York: Little, Brown and Company. ISBN 978-0-316-24754-2.
- Connelly, Sherilyn (2017-04-01). Ponyville Confidential: The History and Culture of My Little Pony, 1981-2016. McFarland. ISBN 978-1-4766-6209-1.
