= Friendship Is Magic (My Little Pony: Friendship Is Magic) =

2010 television episodes

- My Little Pony: Friendship Is Magic episodes
- Twilight Sparkle (center), Applejack, Fluttershy, Rarity, Rainbow Dash, and Pinkie Pie (clockwise from top right) find the spark of friendship and activate the Elements of Harmony to turn Nightmare Moon back into Princess Luna
- Episode nos.: Season 1 Episodes 1 and 2
- Directed by: Jayson Thiessen
- Written by: Lauren Faust
- Original air dates: October 10, 2010 (part 1); October 22, 2010 (part 2)
- Running time: 44 minutes (combined)

Episode chronology
← Previous —	Next → "The Ticket Master"
- My Little Pony: Friendship Is Magic season 1

"Friendship Is Magic" is the two-part series premiere of the animated television series My Little Pony: Friendship Is Magic, the first two episodes of its first season. The episodes follow Twilight Sparkle, a studious, antisocial unicorn, who reluctantly travels to the town of Ponyville at the insistence of her mentor, Princess Celestia. There, she meets five ponies—Applejack, Rainbow Dash, Rarity, Fluttershy, and Pinkie Pie—with whom she becomes close friends. Together, the six defeat Nightmare Moon, a villain who has returned after a thousand years of imprisonment in the moon, with magical artifacts known as the "Elements of Harmony". Many of the creatures that appear in these episodes have designs that convey humor or silliness. Having aired on October 10 and October 22, 2010, the episodes received positive reviews from critics.

== Plot ==
External videos
- Friendship is Magic: Parts 1 & 2 (full episode) — Official upload of the episode onto YouTube

=== Part 1 ===
In the magical land of Equestria, a studious, asocial unicorn named Twilight Sparkle learns of a prophecy; it states that the evil Nightmare Moon will return during the upcoming Summer Sun Celebration after a thousand-year imprisonment on the moon. She tries to warn her mentor, Princess Celestia, the benevolent alicorn ruler of Equestria, of the impending danger. However, the latter dismisses her warnings and sends her and her baby dragon assistant Spike to Ponyville to supervise the preparations for the celebration and make some friends, which Twilight could not care less about.

Twilight reluctantly meets five ponies in charge of the preparations: Applejack, a diligent earth pony who works on her family's apple farm; Rainbow Dash, a tomboyish pegasus who helps control the weather; Rarity, a glamorous unicorn who designs fashion; Fluttershy, a shy pegasus who communicates with animals; and Pinkie Pie, a hyperactive earth pony who loves throwing parties. After Twilight becomes acquainted with them, she looks forward to continuing to study the legend of Nightmare Moon at her new home, the Golden Oak Library, but her plans are spoiled when Pinkie Pie throws her a welcome party. Frustrated, Twilight fails to do any studying and heads to the celebration in the morning. There, Celestia vanishes, and Nightmare Moon appears and decrees everlasting night.

=== Part 2 ===
Twilight, joined by her new friends, returns to her library, recalling a set of artifacts called the Elements of Harmony used to defeat Nightmare Moon in the past. Her guidebook states that five of the elements are known—Honesty, Kindness, Laughter, Generosity, and Loyalty—but the sixth is not. It further reads that when the five Elements are present, a spark will cause the sixth to appear and that their last known location is the Castle of the Two Sisters.

Twilight and her new friends venture into the Everfree Forest, where the castle is located, to find the Elements of Harmony. Nightmare Moon creates obstacles to stop them, but each pony helps the group overcome them using her own strengths. When a cliff is destroyed, Applejack truthfully tells Twilight to let herself fall so Rainbow Dash and Fluttershy can catch her; when a manticore is hurt, Fluttershy stops her friends from attacking him and removes a thorn from his paw; when Nightmare Moon creates scary visuals on a group of trees, Pinkie convinces her friends to laugh at them instead of fear them; when a sea serpent is in despair over losing his mustache, Rarity gives him her tail instead; and when the Shadowbolts, a group of talented flyers, ask Rainbow Dash to be their leader, she declines, citing loyalty to her friends.

Once the group enters the castle, Nightmare Moon kidnaps Twilight and the Elements to another tower, forcing the others to go after them. As Twilight tries to create a spark with her magic, Nightmare Moon shatters the Elements. Though devastated, Twilight hears her friends coming for her and realizes that they all represent the six Elements: Honesty (Applejack), Kindness (Fluttershy), Laughter (Pinkie Pie), Generosity (Rarity), Loyalty (Rainbow Dash) and Magic (herself). The spark is revealed to be a spark of Friendship, and the group wields the Elements to defeat Nightmare Moon, returning her to her original form as Celestia's younger sister, Princess Luna. Celestia returns, forgives Luna, and allows Twilight to stay in Ponyville in order to continue studying the magic of friendship and stay with her new friends.

== Background ==
The opening scene of "Friendship Is Magic" presents drawings that are similar to fairy tale ones. The episodes feature a sea serpent, whose peculiar hair and expressive face "reflect the unexpected humor he lends the story". The Manticore, studied by Lynne Naylor in various incarnations, is intended to depict a silly but ferocious attitude; his sharp wings are a contrast from his circular hair and body structure. Nightmare Moon, an idea from Paul Rudish, has an anatomy, wings, and color palette that represent her menace. The episodes' only song, "Laughter Song", in which Pinkie sings to convince her friends to laugh instead of fear, was written by Daniel Ingram after he was suggested as a songwriter for the show; he wrote a demo based on lyrics by the series creator, Lauren Faust, which ultimately secured him the job.

== Broadcast and reception ==
The first part of the episodes aired on The Hub on October 10, 2010, with the second part airing twelve days later. Critics were positive towards the episodes. Sherilyn Connelly considered the episodes a "fun ride". She praised the climax, stating "the episode[s] ... fly off the rails in an orgy of oddly Spielbergian effects and philosophizing". Though she found the plot predictable, The Mary Sue's Nicole Pucci called the episodes "a great setup for an RPG [role-playing game]". She deemed Rarity's generosity towards the sea serpent as an example of "[t]he show ... address[ing] several things [she] wouldn't have expected to show up in today's overly-sterilized kids' fare". A study by Christian Valiente and Xeno Rasmusson considered the episodes to contest gender stereotypes; they said that females are in positions of authority—such as Applejack's management of her family and Rainbow Dash's controlling the weather— and roles that are primary—with only two male characters who speak—and active—with a female villain driving the story and female ponies resolving the conflict.

== Home media ==
In February 2012, Shout! Factory released a DVD, titled "The Friendship Express", containing both parts of "Friendship Is Magic" along with three other episodes. The premiere has also been included in the first season DVD, released in December of that same year.
