= List of My Little Pony: Friendship Is Magic episodes =

My Little Pony: Friendship Is Magic is an animated television series based on Hasbro's My Little Pony franchise. It is a co-production of DHX Media Vancouver in Canada and Allspark Animation in the United States. The series follows a studious pony named Twilight Sparkle (Tara Strong), her dragon assistant Spike (Cathy Weseluck) and her friends, Applejack (Ashleigh Ball), Rarity (Tabitha St. Germain), Fluttershy (Andrea Libman), Rainbow Dash (Ball) and Pinkie Pie (Libman). They go on adventures and help others around Equestria, solving problems with their friendships.

First aired on The Hub (later renamed Discovery Family) in the United States and Treehouse TV in Canada, each season comprises 26 episodes, with the exception of season 3, which has 13 episodes. During the course of the series, 221 episodes of My Little Pony: Friendship Is Magic aired, including two specials over nine seasons, between October 10, 2010, and October 12, 2019. Other media released during and after its run includes a feature-length film and six clip shows.

Internationally, My Little Pony: Friendship Is Magic aired on Boomerang in the United Kingdom until 2012 and on Tiny Pop and Pop, two British free-to-air children's television channels owned and operated by Sony Pictures Television, from September 2013, Okto in Singapore, Cartoon Network and later Boomerang with Eleven airing repeats in Australia and TV2 in New Zealand, NTV7 and Astro Ceria in Malaysia, e-Junior in the United Arab Emirates, Tooniverse in South Korea, GMA Network (season 1 only) and TV5 (seasons 1–3) in the Philippines and TV Tokyo (seasons 1–2) in Japan. The series garnered positive reviews from critics (Note: On Rotten Tomatoes, season 1 has an approval rating of 100% based on 10 reviews while season 2 consists of two positive reviews, season 3 comprises a negative review and season 4 consists of a positive review.) and received a Hugo Award nomination for Best Dramatic Presentation, Short Form for the episode "The Cutie Map".

== Series overview ==
Series overview
Season	Episodes	Originally released		
Season	Episodes	First released	Last released	Network
1	26	October 10, 2010	May 6, 2011	The Hub/Hub Network
2	26	September 17, 2011	April 21, 2012	The Hub/Hub Network
3	13	November 10, 2012	February 16, 2013	The Hub/Hub Network
4	26	November 23, 2013	May 10, 2014	The Hub/Hub Network
5	26	April 4, 2015	November 28, 2015	Discovery Family
6	26	March 26, 2016	October 22, 2016	Discovery Family
7	26	April 15, 2017	October 28, 2017	Discovery Family
Film		October 6, 2017		—N/a
8	26	March 24, 2018	October 13, 2018	Discovery Family
Holiday special		October 27, 2018		Discovery Family
9	26	April 6, 2019	October 12, 2019	Discovery Family
Special		June 29, 2019		Discovery Family
Clip shows	6	April 20, 2020	May 25, 2020	—N/a

== Episodes ==
=== Season 1 (2010–11) ===
Each episode is directed by Jayson Thiessen with James Wootton as co-director.

No. overall	No. in season	Title	Written by	Original release date	Prod. code
1	1	"Friendship Is Magic" (Note: Part 1 listed as "Mare in the Moon" on Hasbro's website.) (Note: Part 2 listed as "Elements of Harmony" on Hasbro's website.) (Parts 1 & 2)	Lauren Faust	October 10, 2010	101
2	2	"Friendship Is Magic" (Parts 1 & 2)	Lauren Faust	October 22, 2010	102
3	3	"The Ticket Master"	Amy Keating Rogers & Lauren Faust	October 29, 2010	103
4	4	"Applebuck Season"	Amy Keating Rogers	November 5, 2010	104
5	5	"Griffon the Brush Off"	Cindy Morrow	November 12, 2010	105
6	6	"Boast Busters"	Chris Savino	November 19, 2010	106
7	7	"Dragonshy"	Meghan McCarthy	November 26, 2010	107
8	8	"Look Before You Sleep"	Charlotte Fullerton	December 3, 2010	108
9	9	"Bridle Gossip"	Amy Keating Rogers	December 10, 2010	109
10	10	"Swarm of the Century"	M.A. Larson	December 17, 2010	110
11	11	"Winter Wrap Up"	Cindy Morrow	December 24, 2010	111
12	12	"Call of the Cutie"	Meghan McCarthy	January 7, 2011	112
13	13	"Fall Weather Friends"	Amy Keating Rogers	January 28, 2011	113
14	14	"Suited for Success"	Charlotte Fullerton	February 4, 2011	114
15	15	"Feeling Pinkie Keen"	Dave Polsky	February 11, 2011	115
16	16	"Sonic Rainboom"	M.A. Larson	February 18, 2011	116
17	17	"Stare Master"	Chris Savino	February 25, 2011	117
18	18	"The Show Stoppers"	Cindy Morrow	March 4, 2011	118
19	19	"A Dog and Pony Show"	Amy Keating Rogers	March 11, 2011	119
20	20	"Green Isn't Your Color"	Meghan McCarthy	March 18, 2011	120
21	21	"Over a Barrel"	Dave Polsky	March 25, 2011	121
22	22	"A Bird in the Hoof"	Charlotte Fullerton	April 8, 2011	122
23	23	"The Cutie Mark Chronicles"	M.A. Larson	April 15, 2011	123
24	24	"Owl's Well That Ends Well"	Cindy Morrow	April 22, 2011	124
25	25	"Party of One"	Meghan McCarthy	April 29, 2011	125
26	26	"The Best Night Ever"	Amy Keating Rogers	May 6, 2011	126

=== Season 2 (2011–12) ===
Each episode is directed by James Wootton.

No. overall	No. in season	Title	Written by	Original release date	Prod. code	US viewers (millions)
27	1	"The Return of Harmony" (Parts 1 & 2)	M.A. Larson	September 17, 2011	201	0.48
28	2	"The Return of Harmony" (Parts 1 & 2)	M.A. Larson	September 24, 2011	202	N/A
29	3	"Lesson Zero"	Meghan McCarthy	October 15, 2011	203	N/A
30	4	"Luna Eclipsed"	M.A. Larson	October 22, 2011	204	N/A
31	5	"Sisterhooves Social"	Cindy Morrow	November 5, 2011	205	N/A
32	6	"The Cutie Pox"	Amy Keating Rogers	November 12, 2011	206	N/A
33	7	"May the Best Pet Win!"	Charlotte Fullerton	November 19, 2011	207	N/A
34	8	"The Mysterious Mare Do Well"	Merriwether Williams	November 26, 2011	208	N/A
35	9	"Sweet and Elite"	Meghan McCarthy	December 3, 2011	209	N/A
36	10	"Secret of My Excess"	M.A. Larson	December 10, 2011	210	N/A
37	11	"Hearth's Warming Eve"	Merriwether Williams	December 17, 2011	213	N/A
38	12	"Family Appreciation Day"	Cindy Morrow	January 7, 2012	211	N/A
39	13	"Baby Cakes"	Charlotte Fullerton	January 14, 2012	212	N/A
40	14	"The Last Roundup"	Amy Keating Rogers	January 21, 2012	214	N/A
41	15	"The Super Speedy Cider Squeezy 6000"	M.A. Larson	January 28, 2012	215	N/A
42	16	"Read It and Weep"	Cindy Morrow	February 4, 2012	216	N/A
43	17	"Hearts and Hooves Day"	Meghan McCarthy	February 11, 2012	217	0.32
44	18	"A Friend in Deed"	Amy Keating Rogers	February 18, 2012	218	N/A
45	19	"Putting Your Hoof Down"	Story by : Charlotte Fullerton; Teleplay by : Merriwether Williams	March 3, 2012	219	N/A
46	20	"It's About Time"	M.A. Larson	March 10, 2012	220	N/A
47	21	"Dragon Quest"	Merriwether Williams	March 17, 2012	221	N/A
48	22	"Hurricane Fluttershy"	Cindy Morrow	March 24, 2012	222	N/A
49	23	"Ponyville Confidential"	M.A. Larson	March 31, 2012	223	N/A
50	24	"MMMystery on the Friendship Express"	Amy Keating Rogers	April 7, 2012	224	N/A
51	25	"A Canterlot Wedding" (Parts 1 & 2)	Meghan McCarthy	April 21, 2012	225	0.49
52	26	"A Canterlot Wedding" (Parts 1 & 2)	Meghan McCarthy	April 21, 2012	226	0.48

=== Season 3 (2012–13) ===
Like the previous season, James Wootton directed each episode.

No. overall	No. in season	Title	Written by	Original release date	Prod. code	US viewers (millions)
53	1	"The Crystal Empire" (Parts 1 & 2)	Meghan McCarthy	November 10, 2012	301	0.58
54	2	"The Crystal Empire" (Parts 1 & 2)	Meghan McCarthy	November 10, 2012	302	0.58
55	3	"Too Many Pinkie Pies"	Dave Polsky	November 17, 2012	303	0.43
56	4	"One Bad Apple"	Cindy Morrow	November 24, 2012	304	0.49
57	5	"Magic Duel"	M.A. Larson	December 1, 2012	305	0.37
58	6	"Sleepless in Ponyville"	Corey Powell	December 8, 2012	306	0.39
59	7	"Wonderbolts Academy"	Merriwether Williams	December 15, 2012	307	0.51
60	8	"Apple Family Reunion"	Cindy Morrow	December 22, 2012	309	0.37
61	9	"Spike at Your Service"	Story by : Dave Polsky; Teleplay by : Merriwether Williams	December 29, 2012	310	0.43
62	10	"Keep Calm and Flutter On"	Story by : Teddy Antonio; Teleplay by : Dave Polsky	January 19, 2013	311	0.42
63	11	"Just for Sidekicks"	Corey Powell	January 26, 2013	308	0.32
64	12	"Games Ponies Play"	Dave Polsky	February 9, 2013	312	0.39
65	13	"Magical Mystery Cure"	M.A. Larson	February 16, 2013	313	0.49

=== Season 4 (2013–14) ===
Each episode is directed by Jayson Thiessen with Jim Miller as co-director.

No. overall	No. in season	Title	Written by	Original release date	Prod. code	US viewers (millions)
66	1	"Princess Twilight Sparkle" (Parts 1 & 2)	Meghan McCarthy	November 23, 2013	401	0.73
67	2	"Princess Twilight Sparkle" (Parts 1 & 2)	Meghan McCarthy	November 23, 2013	402	0.71
68	3	"Castle Mane-ia"	Josh Haber	November 30, 2013	403	0.46
69	4	"Daring Don't"	Dave Polsky	December 7, 2013	404	0.40
70	5	"Flight to the Finish"	Ed Valentine	December 14, 2013	405	0.57
71	6	"Power Ponies"	Meghan McCarthy, Charlotte Fullerton & Betsy McGowen	December 21, 2013	406	0.68
72	7	"Bats!"	Merriwether Williams	December 28, 2013	407	0.53
73	8	"Rarity Takes Manehattan"	Dave Polsky	January 4, 2014	408	0.53
74	9	"Pinkie Apple Pie"	Natasha Levinger	January 11, 2014	409	0.50
75	10	"Rainbow Falls"	Corey Powell	January 18, 2014	410	0.51
76	11	"Three's a Crowd"	Meghan McCarthy & Ed Valentine	January 25, 2014	411	0.48
77	12	"Pinkie Pride"	Story by : Jayson Thiessen; Teleplay by : Amy Keating Rogers	February 1, 2014	412	0.46
78	13	"Simple Ways"	Josh Haber	February 8, 2014	413	0.55
79	14	"Filli Vanilli"	Amy Keating Rogers	February 15, 2014	414	0.58
80	15	"Twilight Time"	Dave Polsky	February 22, 2014	415	0.47
81	16	"It Ain't Easy Being Breezies"	Natasha Levinger	March 1, 2014	416	0.64
82	17	"Somepony to Watch Over Me"	Scott Sonneborn	March 8, 2014	417	0.63
83	18	"Maud Pie"	Noelle Benvenuti	March 15, 2014	418	0.52
84	19	"For Whom the Sweetie Belle Toils"	Dave Polsky	March 22, 2014	419	0.66
85	20	"Leap of Faith"	Josh Haber	March 29, 2014	420	0.55
86	21	"Testing Testing 1, 2, 3"	Amy Keating Rogers	April 5, 2014	421	0.58
87	22	"Trade Ya!"	Scott Sonneborn	April 19, 2014	422	0.51
88	23	"Inspiration Manifestation"	Corey Powell & Meghan McCarthy	April 26, 2014	423	0.39
89	24	"Equestria Games"	Dave Polsky	May 3, 2014	424	0.41
90	25	"Twilight's Kingdom" (Parts 1 & 2)	Meghan McCarthy	May 10, 2014	425	0.68
91	26	"Twilight's Kingdom" (Parts 1 & 2)	Meghan McCarthy	May 10, 2014	426	0.79

=== Season 5 (2015) ===
No. overall	No. in season	Title	Directed by	Written by	Original release date	Prod. code	US viewers (millions)
92	1	"The Cutie Map" (Parts 1 & 2)	Jayson Thiessen (Note: Co-directed by Jim Miller.)	Story by : Meghan McCarthy; Teleplay by : Scott Sonneborn & M.A. Larson	April 4, 2015	501	0.51
93	2	"The Cutie Map" (Parts 1 & 2)	Jayson Thiessen	Story by : Meghan McCarthy; Teleplay by : Scott Sonneborn & M.A. Larson	April 4, 2015	502	0.57
94	3	"Castle Sweet Castle"	Jim Miller	Joanna Lewis & Kristine Songco	April 11, 2015	503	0.42
95	4	"Bloom & Gloom"	Jim Miller	Josh Haber	April 18, 2015	504	0.54
96	5	"Tanks for the Memories"	Jim Miller	Cindy Morrow	April 25, 2015	505	0.65
97	6	"Appleoosa's Most Wanted"	Jim Miller	Dave Polsky	May 2, 2015	506	0.50
98	7	"Make New Friends but Keep Discord"	Jim Miller	Natasha Levinger	May 16, 2015	507	0.31
99	8	"The Lost Treasure of Griffonstone"	Jim Miller	Amy Keating Rogers	May 23, 2015	508	0.59
100	9	"Slice of Life"	Jim Miller	M.A. Larson	June 13, 2015	509	0.43
101	10	"Princess Spike"	Jim Miller	Story by : Jayson Thiessen & Jim Miller; Teleplay by : Neal Dusedau	June 20, 2015	510	0.26
102	11	"Party Pooped"	Jim Miller	Story by : Jayson Thiessen & Jim Miller; Teleplay by : Nick Confalone	June 27, 2015	511	0.37
103	12	"Amending Fences"	Jim Miller	M.A. Larson	July 4, 2015	512	0.28
104	13	"Do Princesses Dream of Magic Sheep?"	Jim Miller	Story by : Jayson Thiessen & Jim Miller; Teleplay by : Scott Sonneborn	July 11, 2015	513	0.42
105	14	"Canterlot Boutique"	Denny Lu	Amy Keating Rogers	September 12, 2015	514	0.43
106	15	"Rarity Investigates!"	Denny Lu	Story by : Meghan McCarthy, M.A. Larson, Joanna Lewis & Kristine Songco; Teleplay by : Joanna Lewis & Kristine Songco	September 19, 2015	515	N/A
107	16	"Made in Manehattan"	Denny Lu	Noelle Benvenuti	September 26, 2015	516	N/A
108	17	"Brotherhooves Social"	Denny Lu	Dave Polsky	October 3, 2015	517	N/A
109	18	"Crusaders of the Lost Mark"	Denny Lu	Amy Keating Rogers	October 10, 2015	518	0.30
110	19	"The One Where Pinkie Pie Knows"	Denny Lu	Gillian M. Berrow	October 17, 2015	519	0.33
111	20	"Hearthbreakers"	Denny Lu	Nick Confalone	October 24, 2015	520	N/A
112	21	"Scare Master"	Denny Lu	Natasha Levinger	October 31, 2015	521	0.40
113	22	"What About Discord?"	Denny Lu	Neal Dusedau	November 7, 2015	522	N/A
114	23	"The Hooffields and McColts"	Denny Lu	Joanna Lewis & Kristine Songco	November 14, 2015	523	0.48
115	24	"The Mane Attraction"	Denny Lu	Amy Keating Rogers	November 21, 2015	524	0.29
116	25	"The Cutie Re-Mark" (Parts 1 & 2)	Denny Lu	Josh Haber	November 28, 2015	525	0.30
117	26	"The Cutie Re-Mark" (Parts 1 & 2)	Denny Lu	Josh Haber	November 28, 2015	526	0.33

=== Season 6 (2016) ===
The directors for each episode are Denny Lu and Tim Stuby.

No. overall	No. in season	Title	Written by	Original release date	Prod. code	US viewers (millions)
118	1	"The Crystalling" (Parts 1 & 2)	Josh Haber	March 26, 2016	601	0.38
119	2	"The Crystalling" (Parts 1 & 2)	Josh Haber	March 26, 2016	602	0.37
120	3	"The Gift of the Maud Pie"	Story by : Michael P. Fox, Wil Fox & Josh Haber; Teleplay by : Michael P. Fox & Wil Fox	April 2, 2016	603	0.21
121	4	"On Your Marks"	Story by : Dave Polsky; Teleplay by : Josh Haber & Dave Polsky	April 9, 2016	604	0.30
122	5	"Gauntlet of Fire"	Joanna Lewis & Kristine Songco	April 16, 2016	605	N/A
123	6	"No Second Prances"	Nick Confalone	April 30, 2016	606	0.26
124	7	"Newbie Dash"	Story by : Dave Polsky & Dave Rapp; Teleplay by : Dave Rapp	May 7, 2016	607	0.19
125	8	"A Hearth's Warming Tail"	Michael Vogel	May 14, 2016	608	N/A
126	9	"The Saddle Row Review"	Nick Confalone	May 21, 2016	609	0.25
127	10	"Applejack's "Day" Off"	Story by : Neal Dusedau, Michael P. Fox & Wil Fox; Teleplay by : Michael P. Fox & Wil Fox	May 28, 2016	610	0.23
128	11	"Flutter Brutter"	Story by : Meghan McCarthy; Teleplay by : Dave Rapp	June 4, 2016	611	N/A
129	12	"Spice Up Your Life"	Michael Vogel	June 11, 2016	612	N/A
130	13	"Stranger Than Fan Fiction"	Josh Haber & Michael Vogel	July 30, 2016	613	0.25
131	14	"The Cart Before the Ponies"	Story by : Ed Valentine & Michael Vogel; Teleplay by : Ed Valentine	August 6, 2016	614	N/A
132	15	"28 Pranks Later"	Story by : Meghan McCarthy; Teleplay by : F.M. De Marco	August 13, 2016	615	0.20
133	16	"The Times They Are a Changeling"	Story by : Kevin Burke, Michael Vogel & Chris "Doc" Wyatt; Teleplay by : Kevin Burke & Chris "Doc" Wyatt	August 20, 2016	616	0.27
134	17	"Dungeons & Discords"	Nick Confalone	August 27, 2016	617	0.28
135	18	"Buckball Season"	Jennifer Skelly	September 3, 2016	618	N/A
136	19	"The Fault in Our Cutie Marks"	Story by : Josh Haber & Meghan McCarthy; Teleplay by : Ed Valentine	September 10, 2016	619	N/A
137	20	"Viva Las Pegasus"	Story by : Kevin Burke, Michael Vogel & Chris "Doc" Wyatt; Teleplay by : Kevin Burke & Chris "Doc" Wyatt	September 17, 2016	620	N/A
138	21	"Every Little Thing She Does"	Michael Vogel	September 24, 2016	621	0.21
139	22	"P.P.O.V. (Pony Point of View)"	Story by : Kevin Burke, Michael P. Fox, Wil Fox & Chris "Doc" Wyatt; Teleplay by : Michael P. Fox & Wil Fox	October 1, 2016	622	0.19
140	23	"Where the Apple Lies"	Story by : Meghan McCarthy & Dave Rapp; Teleplay by : Dave Rapp	October 8, 2016	623	0.27
141	24	"Top Bolt"	Story by : Joanna Lewis, Meghan McCarthy & Kristine Songco; Teleplay by : Joanna Lewis & Kristine Songco	October 15, 2016	624	N/A
142	25	"To Where and Back Again" (Parts 1 & 2)	Josh Haber & Michael Vogel	October 22, 2016	625	0.26
143	26	"To Where and Back Again" (Parts 1 & 2)	Josh Haber & Michael Vogel	October 22, 2016	626	0.24

=== Season 7 (2017) ===
Denny Lu directs each episode, although there are different co-directors.

No. overall	No. in season	Title	Co-directed by	Written by	Original release date	Prod. code	US viewers (millions)
144	1	"Celestial Advice"	Tim Stuby	Joanna Lewis & Kristine Songco	April 15, 2017	701	0.25
145	2	"All Bottled Up"	Tim Stuby	Joanna Lewis & Kristine Songco	April 15, 2017	702	0.21
146	3	"A Flurry of Emotions"	Tim Stuby	Sammie Crowley & Whitney Wetta	April 22, 2017	703	0.22
147	4	"Rock Solid Friendship"	Tim Stuby	Nick Confalone	April 29, 2017	704	N/A
148	5	"Fluttershy Leans In"	Tim Stuby	Gillian M. Berrow	May 6, 2017 (Note: This episode aired on April 30, 2017 in Canada (Treehouse TV).)	705	N/A
149	6	"Forever Filly"	Tim Stuby	Michael P. Fox & Wil Fox	May 13, 2017 (Note: This episode aired on May 6, 2017 in Canada (Treehouse TV).)	706	N/A
150	7	"Parental Glideance"	Tim Stuby	Josh Hamilton	May 20, 2017 (Note: This episode aired on May 7, 2017 in Canada (Treehouse TV).)	707	N/A
151	8	"Hard to Say Anything"	Mike Myhre	Becky Wangberg	May 27, 2017 (Note: This episode aired on May 13, 2017 in Canada (Treehouse TV).)	708	0.19
152	9	"Honest Apple"	Mike Myhre	Kevin Lappin	June 3, 2017 (Note: This episode aired on May 14, 2017 in Canada (Treehouse TV).)	709	N/A
153	10	"A Royal Problem"	Mike Myhre	Joanna Lewis & Kristine Songco	June 10, 2017 (Note: This episode aired on May 20, 2017 in Canada (Treehouse TV).)	710	0.15
154	11	"Not Asking for Trouble"	Mike Myhre	May Chan	June 17, 2017 (Note: This episode aired on May 21, 2017 in Canada (Treehouse TV).)	711	N/A
155	12	"Discordant Harmony"	Mike Myhre	Michael P. Fox & Wil Fox	August 5, 2017	712	N/A
156	13	"The Perfect Pear"	Mike Myhre	Joanna Lewis & Kristine Songco	August 5, 2017	713	N/A
157	14	"Fame and Misfortune"	Mike Myhre	M.A. Larson	August 12, 2017	714	N/A
158	15	"Triple Threat"	Mike Myhre	Josh Hamilton	August 19, 2017	715	N/A
159	16	"Campfire Tales"	Mike Myhre	Barry Safchik & Michael Platt	August 26, 2017	716	N/A
160	17	"To Change a Changeling"	Mike Myhre	Kevin Lappin	September 2, 2017	717	N/A
161	18	"Daring Done?"	Mike Myhre	Gillian M. Berrow	September 9, 2017 (Note: This episode was published on YouTube on September 3, 2017.)	718	N/A
162	19	"It Isn't the Mane Thing About You"	Mike Myhre	Josh Haber	September 16, 2017	719	N/A
163	20	"A Health of Information"	Mike Myhre	Sammie Crowley & Whitney Wetta	September 23, 2017	720	N/A
164	21	"Marks and Recreation"	Mike Myhre	May Chan	September 30, 2017	721	N/A
165	22	"Once Upon a Zeppelin"	Mike Myhre	Brittany Jo Flores	October 7, 2017	722	N/A
166	23	"Secrets and Pies"	Mike Myhre	Josh Hamilton	October 14, 2017	723	N/A
167	24	"Uncommon Bond"	Mike Myhre	Josh Haber & Kevin Lappin	October 21, 2017 (Note: This episode aired on October 15, 2017 in Canada (Treehouse TV).)	724	N/A
168	25	"Shadow Play" (Parts 1 & 2)	Mike Myhre	Story by : Josh Haber; Teleplay by : Josh Haber & Nicole Dubuc (Note: Josh Haber was credited as the sole writer during this episode's early airing in Canada. During the original airing on Discovery Family and on subsequent airings, the credit was to both Josh Haber and Nicole Dubuc.)	October 28, 2017 (Note: This episode aired on October 21, 2017 in Canada (Treehouse TV).)	725	N/A
169	26	"Shadow Play" (Parts 1 & 2)	Mike Myhre	Story by : Josh Haber; Teleplay by : Josh Haber & Nicole Dubuc	October 28, 2017	726	N/A

=== My Little Pony: The Movie (2017) ===
Title	Directed by	Written by	Original release date
My Little Pony: The Movie	Jayson Thiessen	Story by : Meghan McCarthy & Joe Ballarini; Screenplay by : Meghan McCarthy, Rita Hsiao & Michael Vogel	September 24, 2017 (New York City); October 6, 2017 (general)

=== Season 8 (2018) ===
Directors for each episode are Denny Lu and Mike Myhre.

No. overall	No. in season	Title	Written by	Original release date	Prod. code
170	1	"School Daze" (Parts 1 & 2)	Michael Vogel & Nicole Dubuc	March 24, 2018	801
171	2	"School Daze" (Parts 1 & 2)	Michael Vogel & Nicole Dubuc	March 24, 2018	802
172	3	"The Maud Couple"	Nick Confalone	March 31, 2018	803
173	4	"Fake It 'Til You Make It"	Josh Hamilton	April 7, 2018	804
174	5	"Grannies Gone Wild"	Gillian M. Berrow	April 14, 2018	805
175	6	"Surf and/or Turf"	Brian Hohlfeld	April 21, 2018	806
176	7	"Horse Play"	Kaita Mpambara	April 28, 2018	807
177	8	"The Parent Map"	Dave Rapp	May 5, 2018	808
178	9	"Non-Compete Clause"	Kim Beyer-Johnson	May 12, 2018	809
179	10	"The Break Up Break Down"	Nick Confalone	May 19, 2018	810
180	11	"Molt Down"	Josh Haber	May 26, 2018	811
181	12	"Marks for Effort"	Nicole Dubuc	June 2, 2018	812
182	13	"The Mean 6"	Michael Vogel	June 9, 2018	813
183	14	"A Matter of Principals"	Nicole Dubuc	August 4, 2018	814
184	15	"The Hearth's Warming Club"	Brian Hohlfeld	August 4, 2018	815
185	16	"Friendship University"	Chris "Doc" Wyatt & Kevin Burke	August 11, 2018	816
186	17	"The End in Friend"	Gillian M. Berrow	August 18, 2018	817
187	18	"Yakity-Sax"	Michael P. Fox & Wil Fox	August 25, 2018 (Note: This episode aired on July 20, 2018 as part of Discovery Family's "Summer Surprises" programming block, however this article will use the order provided by The Futon Critic to keep consistency.)	818
188	19	"Road to Friendship"	Josh Haber	September 1, 2018	819
189	20	"The Washouts"	Nick Confalone	September 8, 2018	820
190	21	"A Rockhoof and a Hard Place"	Kaita Mpambara	September 15, 2018	821
191	22	"What Lies Beneath"	Michael Vogel	September 22, 2018	822
192	23	"Sounds of Silence"	Gregory Bonsignore	September 29, 2018	823
193	24	"Father Knows Beast"	Josh Haber	October 6, 2018	824
194	25	"School Raze" (Parts 1 & 2)	Nicole Dubuc	October 13, 2018	825
195	26	"School Raze" (Parts 1 & 2)	Josh Haber	October 13, 2018	826

=== Holiday special (2018) ===
My Little Pony: Best Gift Ever is a double-length Christmas-themed special that aired in between the eighth and ninth seasons of the series. It was followed by a series of three supplementary animated shorts that were uploaded to YouTube on December 11, 2018.

Title	Directed by	Written by	Original air date
My Little Pony: Best Gift Ever	Denny Lu & Mike Myhre	Michael Vogel	October 27, 2018
The Mane Six and Spike try to find each other the best gift ever for Hearth's Warming.

=== Animated shorts (2019) ===
A series of five animated shorts were published weekly to the My Little Pony YouTube channel in early 2019 in the months prior to the season nine premiere.

No.	Title	Written by	Storyboard by	Original release date
1	"Rarity's Biggest Fan"	Gillian M. Berrow	Aynsley King	January 29, 2019
Rarity sets out to create a constantly flowing mane-style for herself, similar to Princesses Celestia and Luna.
2	"Ail-icorn"	Kim Beyer-Johnson	Chelsea Woolman	February 5, 2019
Twilight Sparkle comes down with a horn allergy that causes her to sneeze out bursts of uncontrolled magic.
3	"Teacher of the Month"	Katherine Chilson	Aynsley King	February 12, 2019
Shortly after the events of the season eight episode "Non-Compete Clause", after Fluttershy wins her 16th Teacher of the Month award, Applejack and Rainbow Dash ask her for advice on how to improve their chances with the students.
4	"Starlight the Hypnotist"	Gillian M. Berrow	Chelsea Woolman	February 19, 2019
Starlight Glimmer tries to cure Twilight's entomophobia; but she ends up flying a kite every time she sees a ladybug.
5	"Sundae, Sundae, Sundae"	Gillian M. Berrow	Aynsley King	February 26, 2019
Pinkie Pie and the Cakes open up an ice cream museum at Sugarcube Corner on a hot day.

=== Season 9 (2019) ===
On February 17, 2018, at the American International Toy Fair, a ninth season was announced by Hasbro. In a TV Kids Guide by Gaumont, it was confirmed that season nine will have 26 episodes. At the following year's Toy Fair in New York, it was confirmed that this will be the final season of the series. It premiered on April 6, 2019. Among highlights include the series' 200th episode as well as the return of "Weird Al" Yankovic and Patton Oswalt as Cheese Sandwich and Quibble Pants, respectively.

As with the previous season, Denny Lu and Mike Myhre direct each episode.

No. overall	No. in season	Title	Written by	Original release date	Prod. code
196	1	"The Beginning of the End" (Parts 1 & 2)	Joanna Lewis & Kristine Songco	April 6, 2019	901
197	2	"The Beginning of the End" (Parts 1 & 2)	Joanna Lewis & Kristine Songco	April 6, 2019	902
198	3	"Uprooted"	Nicole Dubuc	April 13, 2019	903
199	4	"Sparkle's Seven"	Story by : Ashleigh Ball, Andrea Libman, Tabitha St. Germain, Tara Strong & Cathy Weseluck; Teleplay by : Josh Haber & Nicole Dubuc	April 20, 2019	904
200	5	"The Point of No Return"	Gillian M. Berrow	April 27, 2019	905
201	6	"Common Ground"	Josh Haber	May 4, 2019	906
202	7	"She's All Yak"	Brian Hohlfeld	May 11, 2019	907
203	8	"Frenemies"	Michael Vogel	May 18, 2019	908
204	9	"Sweet and Smoky"	Kim Beyer-Johnson	May 25, 2019	909
205	10	"Going to Seed"	Dave Rapp	June 1, 2019	910
206	11	"Student Counsel"	Josh Haber	June 8, 2019	911
207	12	"The Last Crusade"	Nicole Dubuc	June 15, 2019	912
208	13	"Between Dark and Dawn"	Gail Simone	June 22, 2019	913
209	14	"The Last Laugh"	Michael P. Fox & Wil Fox	August 3, 2019	914
210	15	"2, 4, 6, Greaaat"	Kaita Mpambara	August 10, 2019	915
211	16	"A Trivial Pursuit"	Brittany Jo Flores	August 17, 2019	916
212	17	"The Summer Sun Setback"	Michael Vogel	August 24, 2019	917
213	18	"She Talks to Angel"	Nick Confalone	August 31, 2019	918
214	19	"Dragon Dropped"	Josh Haber	September 7, 2019	919
215	20	"A Horse Shoe-In"	Ariel Shepherd-Oppenheim	September 14, 2019	920
216	21	"Daring Doubt"	Nicole Dubuc	September 21, 2019	921
217	22	"Growing Up is Hard to Do"	Ed Valentine	September 28, 2019	922
218	23	"The Big Mac Question"	Josh Haber & Michael Vogel	October 5, 2019	923
219	24	"The Ending of the End" (Parts 1 & 2)	Nicole Dubuc	October 12, 2019	924
220	25	"The Ending of the End" (Parts 1 & 2)	Michael Vogel	October 12, 2019	925
221	26	"The Last Problem"	Josh Haber	October 12, 2019	926

=== Rainbow Roadtrip (2019) ===
My Little Pony: Rainbow Roadtrip is a 60-minute special that aired on Discovery Family during the season nine mid-season hiatus between episodes 13 and 14. It was produced by the Irish animation studio Boulder Media rather than DHX and features the same animation style used in the 2017 movie.

Title	Directed by	Written by	Original air date
My Little Pony: Rainbow Roadtrip	Gillian Comerford	Kim Beyer-Johnson	June 29, 2019
Rainbow Dash has been invited to a festival at Hope Hollow as a guest of honor.

=== Clip shows (2020) ===
Clip show episodes of the series were released exclusively through the 9Now video-on-demand service in Australia. These episodes replace the words "Friendship is Magic" in the series logo with "Friendship is Forever" in the opening sequence, and they feature various clips of episodes from seasons one through nine alongside brand new animation. These episodes were written by Josh Haber and directed by Denny Lu and Mike Myhre.

No.	Title	Original release date
1	"A-Dressing Memories"	April 20, 2020
Rarity reminisces about her past moments of generosity while making the dress for Twilight Sparkle's princess coronation.
2	"Cakes for the Memories"	April 27, 2020
Pinkie Pie reminisces about her past moments of laughter while making the cakes for Twilight Sparkle's princess coronation.
3	"Memnagerie"	May 4, 2020
Fluttershy reminisces about her past moments of kindness while Twilight Sparkle assists her in overseeing rehearsals for the animal presentation for Twilight's princess coronation.
4	"Deep Tissue Memories"	May 11, 2020
Rainbow Dash reminisces about her past moments of loyalty (and awesomeness) with Twilight Sparkle at the Ponyville Day Spa.
5	"Harvesting Memories"	May 18, 2020
Applejack reminisces about her past moments of honesty without revealing her true intentions to Twilight Sparkle.
6	"Memories and More"	May 25, 2020
Starlight Glimmer, Spike, and the rest of their friends make last-minute memory additions to Twilight Sparkle's scrapbook present in time for her coronation.
