= Twilight Time =

Twilight Time may refer to:

- Twilight, the time between dawn and sunrise or between sunset and dusk
- "Twilight Time" (1944 song), a popular song, best known in the 1958 version by the Platters
- "Twilight Time" (The Moody Blues song), 1967
- Twilight Time (album), a 1993 album by Stratovarius, or the title song
- Twilight Time, an album by André Gagnon
- Twilight Time (home video label), a specialty DVD and Blu-ray label releasing limited editions of classic and vintage films
- "Twilight Time" (My Little Pony: Friendship Is Magic), a season 4 episode
- Twilight Time (film), a 1982 drama film
