= Daring Don't =

- My Little Pony: Friendship Is Magic episode
- Rainbow Dash (left) watches helplessly as Ahuizotl carries Daring Do into his fortress.
- Episode no.: Season 4 Episode 4
- Written by: Dave Polsky
- Original air date: December 7, 2013
- Running time: 22 minutes

Episode chronology
← Previous "Castle Mane-ia"	Next → "Flight to the Finish"
- My Little Pony: Friendship Is Magic season 4

"Daring Don't" is the fourth episode of the fourth season of the animated television series My Little Pony: Friendship Is Magic. The episode was written by Dave Polsky. It originally aired on The Hub on December 7, 2013. In this episode, Rainbow Dash and her friends discover that A.K. Yearling (a nod to author J.K. Rowling), the author of the Daring Do books, is actually Daring Do herself.

== Plot ==
External videos
- Daring Don't (full episode) — Official upload of the episode onto YouTube

Rainbow Dash becomes devastated when Twilight informs her that the next Daring Do novel has been delayed by two additional months, pushing the release date back to six months total. Convinced that author A.K. Yearling must be too busy with mundane tasks to focus on writing, Rainbow decides to track her down and offer assistance with daily chores so she can concentrate on completing the book. Despite Twilight's initial reluctance, she agrees to help locate the author's residence, and the Mane Six travel to find A.K. Yearling.

When they arrive at A.K. Yearling's home, they find it ransacked and apparently abandoned, but the author soon returns and begins searching through the debris while ignoring her unexpected visitors. The Mane Six watch in shock as three stallions break into the cottage and surround A.K. Yearling, who throws off her disguise to reveal that she is actually Daring Do herself, the protagonist of her own novels. Dr. Caballeron appears and steals a golden ring from Daring Do before escaping with his henchmen, leaving the Mane Six stunned.

Rainbow Dash eagerly volunteers to help Daring Do retrieve the stolen artifact, but her nervous excitement and tendency to call out at crucial moments repeatedly sabotages the mission. During a nighttime confrontation at Caballeron's camp, Rainbow inadvertently alerts the villain Ahuizotl to Daring's presence when she tries to return a dropped helmet. Ahuizotl captures both the ring and Daring Do as a result and carries his prisoner into the jungle. Rainbow Dash joins her friends in following Ahuizotl to his fortress, where they discover him preparing to use the golden ring in a ritual that will bring oppressive heat to the region. The Mane Six work together to disrupt the ceremony while Rainbow rescues Daring Do from a piranha-filled death trap. In the fortress's central chamber, Rainbow and Daring remove a stack of the ring's counterparts from an altar, and Daring admits that she intentionally got captured to access the location but needed Rainbow's help to lift the heavy artifacts.

After the rings are successfully removed, the fortress collapses, thwarting Ahuizotl. Daring Do thanks Rainbow for her assistance before departing to finish her delayed novel. Some time later, Rainbow receives a package containing the completed book, which features cover art depicting both Daring Do and Rainbow Dash together.

== Development ==
According to Brian Lenard of Hasbro Studios, DHX expanding on the lighting effects of Season 4 (particularly in "Daring Don't") was a "spectacular surprise". Phil Caesar of DHX Media stated that he tried to base the episode on an "Indiana Jones kind of feel in lighting and color."

== Reception ==
Sherilyn Connelly, the author of Ponyville Confidential, gave the episode a "D" rating. She wrote that some viewers criticized show creator Lauren Faust for the racial undertones of the episode, though Faust had been long unaffiliated with the show by then.

In a critical analysis of the episode, author Jen A. Blue described "Daring Don't" as "frankly, bizarre" and criticized the decision to make Daring Do a real character rather than remaining fictional, calling it "utterly baffling." Blue argued that there is a fundamental incompatibility between Friendship Is Magic and Daring Do adventures, noting that Daring Do's insistence that she works alone conflicts with the show's core theme that "Equestria is a world that runs on the magic of friendship." Blue criticized the episode's structure as awkwardly stitching a complete Daring Do story onto an incomplete Friendship Is Magic story, arguing that it "starts as a slightly-off episode of Friendship Is Magic, but then transforms jarringly into an episode of some action-heavy other show." Blue expressed concern that the episode represented part of a troubling trend where the show was moving away from its character-focused roots toward action and adventure elements.

Daniel Alvarez of Unleash The Fanboy gave the episode a rating of 4 out of 5 and called it "a fun adventure story with great action," praising how Daring Do easily steals the show with her personality. Alvarez noted that while Rainbow Dash was rather annoying with her constant whining, the fantastic Daring Do made up for it and the episode featured plenty of action that fans would be happy about.

Sofie Liv of The Agony Booth gave the episode a rating of 2 out of 5 and called it "below average," criticizing that the episode's message has been done before and better on the show. Liv wrote it was odd that Rainbow Dash was rewarded for imposing on Daring Do rather than learning about respect and decency, since Rainbow Dash "was clearly the one in the wrong" and should have been the one to learn a lesson.

In an article arguing that Friendship Is Magic is a work of high fantasy, Megan Crouse of Den of Geek described "Daring Don't" as "an earnest, upbeat episode" but also wrote that the episode is "one of the less magical events in the season," functioning more as a detective story about Yearling keeping her alter ego secret rather than involving mystical powers.

== See also ==
- List of My Little Pony: Friendship Is Magic episodes
