= Twilight Time (My Little Pony: Friendship Is Magic) =

- My Little Pony: Friendship Is Magic episode
- Diamond Tiara and Silver Spoon (left) jump up and down in excitement of seeing Princess Twilight Sparkle (right).
- Episode no.: Season 4 Episode 15
- Written by: Dave Polsky
- Original air date: February 22, 2014
- Running time: 22 minutes

Episode chronology
← Previous "Filli Vanilli"	Next → "It Ain't Easy Being Breezies"
- My Little Pony: Friendship Is Magic season 4

"Twilight Time" is the fifteenth episode of the fourth season of the animated television series My Little Pony: Friendship Is Magic. The episode was written by Dave Polsky. It originally aired on The Hub on February 22, 2014. In this episode, the Cutie Mark Crusaders take advantage of their weekly mentorship lessons with Twilight Sparkle to gain popularity at school.

== Plot ==
External videos
- Twilight Time (full episode) — Official upload of the episode onto YouTube

The Cutie Mark Crusaders spend their weekly "Twilight Time" sessions learning new skills from Princess Twilight Sparkle at the Golden Oak Library, with Sweetie Belle practicing magic, Scootaloo working on research, and Apple Bloom experimenting with potions. At school, they grow frustrated watching Diamond Tiara receive praise and attention for having her butler perform acrobatic stunts while she takes credit. When Diamond Tiara and Silver Spoon boast about their celebrity connections in Manehattan, Sweetie Belle impulsively reveals that the Crusaders regularly hang out with Princess Twilight, which captures Diamond Tiara and Silver Spoon's attention.

The Crusaders bring Diamond Tiara and Silver Spoon to meet Twilight, who feels uncomfortable with the attention and asks that their weekly visits remain private. However, Diamond Tiara and Silver Spoon immediately spread word about "Twilight Time" throughout the school, which instantly turns the Crusaders into the most popular fillies in school. Sweetie Belle embraces their newfound popularity and arranges a public lunch with Twilight at the Hay Burger, unaware that their entire class plans to spy on the princess.

When the hidden foals swarm Twilight for photos and autographs, they discover that she chooses restaurants based on the Crusaders' recommendations, making the trio even more influential and popular. The Crusaders exploit their celebrity status to receive free gifts and special treatment. However, the demanding classmates soon follow them everywhere, forcing them to flee toward the library to explain the situation to Twilight.

All the foals arrive at the library and Twilight learns they only want to associate with her to become popular rather than to learn. Disappointed, Twilight dismisses the crowd and confronts the Crusaders, who fail to demonstrate their skills due to neglecting their practice in favor of enjoying fame. Twilight gives them a second chance and allows their private lessons to continue, with the trio now wearing disguises to avoid recognition by their classmates.

== Reception ==
Sherilyn Connelly, the author of Ponyville Confidential, gave the episode an "A+" rating. She wrote that it was the first time Twilight struggled with her princesshood since the season 4 premiere "Princess Twilight Sparkle" and called "Twilight Time" the "first great episode" of season 4.

In a critical analysis of the episode, author Jen A. Blue noted that "Twilight Time" follows a pattern common to Cutie Mark Crusaders episodes where they innocently pursue goals until unintended consequences snowball into disaster, but wrote that this episode differs from the usual formula by showing Twilight from an outside perspective rather than focusing on her internal concerns. Blue analyzed how the episode explores the objectification that comes with celebrity status, arguing that "to be on a pedestal is to be an object, not a real person" and that the foals treat Twilight as a superior and distant figure rather than engaging with her as a person. Blue wrote that by positioning the episode outside of Twilight's perspective, the story makes clear that the Crusaders' decision to treat Twilight as a superior being is the real problem, which demonstrates that the issue is not loneliness at the top but rather that there is a top at all. Blue concluded that the Crusaders serve as an effective way to examine how the Mane Six appear from outside perspectives while maintaining focus on the show's actual main characters.

Daniel Alvarez of Unleash The Fanboy gave the episode a rating of 4 out of 5 and called it "a pretty nice watch" but noted it did not come close to the greatness of "Flight to the Finish," though he praised the episode's message about friendship versus celebrity. He described Twilight as "terrifically written" and wrote that it was one of his personal favorite portrayals of Twilight in the show. Sofie Liv of The Agony Booth gave the episode a rating of 2.5 out of 5 and called it "all around average," writing that she did not see what the Cutie Mark Crusaders did wrong since they didn't act mean or full of themselves enough for the episode's lesson to work effectively.

== See also ==
- List of My Little Pony: Friendship Is Magic episodes
