= Rainbow Falls (My Little Pony: Friendship Is Magic) =

- My Little Pony: Friendship Is Magic episode
- The village of Rainbow Falls, which contains a training course for the Equestria Games tryouts.
- Episode no.: Season 4 Episode 10
- Written by: Corey Powell
- Original air date: January 18, 2014
- Running time: 22 minutes

Episode chronology
← Previous "Pinkie Apple Pie"	Next → "Three's a Crowd"
- My Little Pony: Friendship Is Magic season 4

"Rainbow Falls" is the tenth episode of the fourth season of the animated television series My Little Pony: Friendship Is Magic. The episode was written by Corey Powell. It originally aired on The Hub on January 18, 2014. In this episode, Rainbow Dash leads the Ponyville team for a relay race to qualify for the Equestria Games but faces a loyalty crisis when the Wonderbolts offer her a chance to join their team after one of their members is injured.

== Plot ==
External videos
- Rainbow Falls (full episode) — Official upload of the episode onto YouTube

Rainbow Dash leads Ponyville's aerial relay team with Fluttershy and Bulk Biceps as they prepare for the Equestria Games tryouts at Rainbow Falls. Despite her teammates' obvious limitations compared to the elite Wonderbolts representing Cloudsdale, Rainbow remains confident she can carry them to victory. When Soarin' injures his wing during practice and Rainbow saves him from a dangerous fall, Spitfire and Fleetfoot invite her to train with the Wonderbolts while he recovers, pointing out that Cloudsdale is technically her hometown and that she is eligible to compete for them.

Rainbow begins secretly practicing with both teams. Twilight catches her switching between teams and confronts her about the ethical implications, but Rainbow argues that she is having more fun with the "winners" and insists Ponyville will still qualify with her help. Spitfire and Fleetfoot ask Rainbow to join Cloudsdale permanently, as they claim that Soarin will not be able to recover in time for the tryouts. Rainbow is torn between her dream opportunity and her loyalty to her friends.

Unable to make the difficult choice, Rainbow fakes an injury and confines herself to a wheelchair, hoping to avoid the decision entirely. While her friends offer comfort and support, Twilight pointedly tells her that "choosing not to choose isn't really a decision." In the medical center, Rainbow meets the supposedly injured Soarin' and discovers he has actually recovered completely but was told to sit out just in case.

Rainbow confronts Spitfire and Fleetfoot about their dishonesty and chooses to remain with Ponyville. The Wonderbolts acknowledge her integrity and reinstate Soarin' to their team, and both squads successfully qualify for the Equestria Games.

== Reception ==
Sherilyn Connelly, the author of Ponyville Confidential, gave the episode a "B+" rating.

In a critical analysis of the episode, author Jen A. Blue noted that "Rainbow Falls" had the distinction of being part of two separate arcs, the Equestria Games arc and the quest for the keys (from "Princess Twilight Sparkle"), and praised how it avoided being formulaic by merging these storylines. She described the episode as "a 'greatest hits' tour of Rainbow Dash's past focus adventures," referencing multiple previous episodes, and analyzed it through a kabbalistic framework, associating Rainbow Dash with the sefira of keter, the Crown, which she argued fits both diegetically as the creator of the Sonic Rainboom and extradiegetically as a possible point of origin for the Mane Six. Blue identified the qlippoth Thamiel as a representation of the clash of opposing forces in the episode and wrote that Rainbow Dash's focus on competition rather than collaboration caused her to lose sight of her Element of Loyalty. Blue concluded that Rainbow Dash's realization that the trials are about working together rather than defeating competitors leads to her walking rather than flying to announce her decision, symbolizing her understanding that "even the ground is not her enemy."

Ed Liu of Anime Superhero News called the episode "good but not great". Daniel Alvarez of Unleash The Fanboy gave the episode a rating of 4 out of 5 and called it "definitely one of the season's highlights," praising the return of Derpy Hooves and the writing, especially the dialogue between Rainbow Dash and Twilight. Alvarez criticized the Wonderbolts' portrayal as using deceit to get Rainbow on their team but concluded the episode would "definitely go down as a highlight from Season 4."

Sofie Liv of The Agony Booth gave the episode a rating of 1 out of 5 and called it "a bit of a dud, and well below average for this show," criticizing character inconsistencies and the portrayal of the Wonderbolts as unlikeable. She also criticized Twilight's reasoning as unreasonable and found that Bulk Biceps should not have been featured so prominently as the joke wore thin quickly.

== See also ==
- List of My Little Pony: Friendship Is Magic episodes
