= For Whom the Sweetie Belle Toils =

- My Little Pony: Friendship Is Magic episode
- In a dream sequence, Sweetie Belle (right) sees a Rarity (left) cloud laughing maniacally.
- Episode no.: Season 4 Episode 19
- Written by: Dave Polsky
- Original air date: March 22, 2014
- Running time: 22 minutes

Guest appearance
- Rena Anakwe as Sapphire Shores

Episode chronology
← Previous "Maud Pie"	Next → "Leap of Faith"
- My Little Pony: Friendship Is Magic season 4

"For Whom the Sweetie Belle Toils" is the nineteenth episode of the fourth season of the animated television series My Little Pony: Friendship Is Magic. The episode was written by Dave Polsky. It originally aired on The Hub on March 22, 2014. In this episode, Sweetie Belle becomes jealous when Rarity's costume designs overshadow her school play.

The title of the episode is a reference to the Ernest Hemingway novel For Whom the Bell Tolls.

== Plot ==
External videos
- For Whom the Sweetie Belle Toils (full episode) — Official upload of the episode onto YouTube

Sweetie Belle asks her older sister Rarity to help finish the costumes for her school play at the last minute. Rarity agrees to help despite her busy schedule creating dresses for pop star Sapphire Shores, and she transforms Sweetie Belle's poorly designed costumes into spectacular creations. The play receives a standing ovation, but Sweetie Belle becomes frustrated when she discovers that audience members are only discussing Rarity's amazing costumes rather than her writing, directing, or performance.

Sweetie Belle storms out after confronting her sister about overshadowing her efforts. That night, consumed with resentment, she sneaks into Rarity's room and sabotages the centerpiece of Sapphire Shores' elaborate headdress by unraveling its intricate design. Princess Luna visits Sweetie Belle's dreams and shows her flashbacks revealing that Rarity's past "spotlight-stealing" moments were actually attempts to help save situations, including salvaging Sweetie Belle's fifth birthday party.

Luna then reveals the devastating consequences that Sweetie Belle's sabotage will bring: Sapphire Shores will reject Rarity's work, destroying her reputation and career, causing her to become a paranoid recluse who loses all her friends and descends into madness. Horrified, Sweetie Belle awakens and rushes to fix her mistake, only to discover that Rarity has already departed for Canterlot with the damaged costume. The Cutie Mark Crusaders race to Canterlot by train.

At Sapphire Shores' rehearsal studio, the Crusaders zip-line through a window. Sweetie Belle grabs the headdress box and flees to a private room where Princess Luna appears to help her repair the damage. Working together, they not only fix the sabotaged centerpiece but also add the design of a dolphin, which Luna knows from Sapphire Shores' dreams to be her lucky symbol. When Sweetie Belle returns the headdress, Sapphire loves the dolphin addition, saving Rarity's career and earning great praise for the effort. Sweetie Belle apologizes to Rarity, knowing that she was only trying to help. Rarity forgives her, but also says she regrets not being able to see her play. She then asks if she can have an encore performance. Sweetie Belle says that the play wasn’t really all that good, and to be honest, the costumes were the best part. She and Rarity hug each other, then the episode ends.

== Reception ==
Sherilyn Connelly, the author of Ponyville Confidential, gave the episode an "A" rating and called it (along with "Somepony to Watch Over Me" and "Maud Pie") a "terrific run about sisterhood". She noted the parallel of Sweetie Belle's jealousy in "For Whom the Sweetie Belle Toils" of her sister to that of Princess Luna's own jealousy that turned her into Nightmare Moon, which was not addressed up until this episode, and wrote that while the mortal Sweetie Belle will grow and find her own identity, Luna will forever be overshadowed by her sister, Princess Celestia. Connelly further drew a parallel to Sunset Shimmer and Princess Twilight in Equestria Girls: Rainbow Rocks.

In a critical analysis of the episode, author Jen A. Blue noted that "For Whom the Sweetie Belle Toils" reverses the show's usual approach to mythology by making "the cosmic personal" rather than the personal cosmic, as "the ancient war of moon and sun becomes a point within Sweetie Belle's life, descending through her dreams in order to help her work through a personal issue." Blue analyzed the parallel between Sweetie Belle's jealousy and Luna's past transformation into Nightmare Moon, and explored the various performances throughout the episode, including Luna's constructed dream sequence for Sweetie Belle. Blue examined the chain reaction of uncredited support at the episode's conclusion, where characters help each other without seeking recognition, and argued that Luna has learned to accept being less popular than Celestia by realizing that popularity is not the only measure of worth. Blue concluded that Luna is now content to do meaningful work behind the scenes, just as Rarity is satisfied to create quality costumes that will be recognized by those elite enough to appreciate good craftsmanship.

Daniel Alvarez of Unleash The Fanboy gave the episode a rating of 9 out of 10 and called it "a really solid episode," comparing it to a combination of "Sisterhooves Social" and "Sleepless in Ponyville". He praised Dave Polsky's writing of Rarity and Luna's appearance but felt that Sweetie Belle's sabotage was "a bit overkill". Megan Crouse of Den of Geek used the episode as an example of how Friendship Is Magic is a high fantasy that demonstrates its self-consistent system of magic and illustrates the question of how a hero can change their fate, contrasting it to other fantasy works like The Belgariad and the Star Wars prequel trilogy.

== See also ==
- List of My Little Pony: Friendship Is Magic episodes
