= Rarity Takes Manehattan =

- My Little Pony: Friendship Is Magic episode
- Rarity (left) meets Suri Polomare (right).
- Episode no.: Season 4 Episode 8
- Written by: Dave Polsky
- Original air date: January 4, 2014
- Running time: 22 minutes

Episode chronology
← Previous "Bats!"	Next → "Pinkie Apple Pie"
- My Little Pony: Friendship Is Magic season 4

"Rarity Takes Manehattan" is the eighth episode of the fourth season of the animated television series My Little Pony: Friendship Is Magic. The episode was written by Dave Polsky. It originally aired on The Hub on January 4, 2014. In this episode, Rarity participates in a fashion competition in Manehattan but faces challenges when competitor Suri Polomare steals her designs.

== Plot ==
External videos
- Rarity Takes Manehattan (full episode) — Official upload of the episode onto YouTube

Rarity travels to Manehattan with her friends to compete in a prestigious fashion contest and brings tickets to the sold-out musical Hinny of the Hills, obtained from a friend who worked as the show's costume designer, as a thank-you gift for their support. Upon arriving, she embraces the spirit of generosity by performing numerous acts of kindness for strangers, from tipping bellhops to helping taxi drivers and giving away her scarf to a needy pony ("Generosity").

At the fashion plaza, Rarity meets fellow designer Suri Polomare, who compliments her unique fabric and requests a small swatch for accent work. Rarity gladly provides the sample, but her generosity backfires when she later discovers that Suri has created an entire clothing line using the gifted fabric and is passing it off as her own original design. When Rarity confronts her, Suri coldly dismisses her complaints with the philosophy that "it's everypony for herself in the big city," leaving Rarity devastated and betrayed.

Determined to create a new collection before the contest deadline, Rarity enlists her friends' help in an all-night sewing marathon that causes them to miss the musical they were excited to see. As the pressure mounts, Rarity becomes increasingly demanding and accuses her friends of abandoning her when they mention their disappointment about missing the show. She works them through the night without regard for their exhaustion, then rushes off to the competition with the finished dresses without even thanking them.

During the contest, Rarity realizes her friends are not present in the audience and has an epiphany about how poorly she treated them, and rushes back to the hotel to apologize ("Generosity (reprise)"). She discovers they did not leave for Ponyville but simply overslept, and though Suri claims Rarity lost the competition, she focuses on making amends by arranging a private showing of Hinny of the Hills for the group. After the musical, Suri's assistant Coco Pommel reveals that Rarity actually won the contest but that Suri tried to claim victory by default. Coco presents her with the rightful trophy and a gift box containing rainbow-colored thread, and Rarity endorses Coco as dressmaker for her friend's next theater show, which she accepts.

== Reception ==
Sherilyn Connelly, the author of Ponyville Confidential, gave the episode a "B+" rating and used it as an example of an episode that did not feature adventure elements as a rebuttal to the notion that "nearly all" episodes are adventure stories. Daniel Alvarez of Unleash The Fanboy gave the episode a perfect rating of 5 out of 5 and called it "the best Season 4 episode and one of the show's finest," describing it as maybe Rarity's greatest outing yet. He praised Dave Polsky's writing as his best episode yet and commended the episode's genuine emotion, heart, and moral about never stopping being generous even when others take advantage of it. Brendan Kachel of flayrah described Rarity's reaction to having her fabric stolen as "pretty hilarious, especially when she sarcastically drops the show's subtitle mid-rant." Ed Liu of Anime Superhero News described the episode as "pretty entertaining overall" and noted he was "consistently surprised that the show can make Rarity so sympathetic, considering she sometimes does fit the expected shallow and vain stereotype of the fashion-obsessed." He praised how the episode managed to find a charming way to emphasize the show's theme of the importance of friendship by the end.

In a critical analysis of the episode, author Jen A. Blue identified "Rarity Takes Manehattan" as introducing the show's first season-long preplanned arc and—as in her analysis of "Bats!"—analyzed it through a kabbalistic framework, describing Suri Polomare as a qlippothic counterpart to Rarity who represents "the capitalist ideal of the economically rational actor." Blue compared Suri's selfishness to Rarity's presentation of Manehattan as a gift economy and wrote that "the rational actor wins in the short term, making it often look as if economic rationality—or, to call it what it is, callous, manipulative selfishness—is the winning approach." Blue further analyzed the episode as operating on three layers: exterior ideological intrusion, Rarity being tested to the limits of her generosity, and Rarity teaching generosity to others, particularly Coco Pommel. Blue concluded that this episode establishes the formula for acquiring the remaining keys (in "Princess Twilight Sparkle"), with each pony being tested and in passing their test teaching another, and described this sharing as "the essence of the process."

Sofie Liv of The Agony Booth gave the episode a perfect rating of 5 out of 5 and called it "possibly the best Rarity episode the show has produced so far." She praised the episode's message about generosity and wrote "It doesn't get better than this," commending the clear execution of the moral about how some people will use and abuse generous individuals.

== See also ==
- List of My Little Pony: Friendship Is Magic episodes
