= Testing Testing 1, 2, 3 =

- My Little Pony: Friendship Is Magic episode
- Pinkie Pie (center) sings a rap song about the history of the Wonderbolts.
- Episode no.: Season 4 Episode 21
- Written by: Amy Keating Rogers
- Original air date: April 5, 2014
- Running time: 22 minutes

Episode chronology
← Previous "Leap of Faith"	Next → "Trade Ya!"
- My Little Pony: Friendship Is Magic season 4

"Testing Testing 1, 2, 3" is the twenty-first episode of the fourth season of the animated television series My Little Pony: Friendship Is Magic. The episode was written by Amy Keating Rogers. It originally aired on The Hub on April 5, 2014. In this episode, Rainbow Dash struggles to study for her Wonderbolts entrance exam using traditional academic methods with Twilight Sparkle.

== Plot ==
Rainbow Dash faces an upcoming entrance exam for the Wonderbolts Reserves but shows little concern about studying. Twilight attempts to tutor Rainbow using traditional academic methods, but she struggles with every conventional approach Twilight tries. Rainbow begins to worry about failing and blames Twilight's methods; their argument attracts the rest of the Mane Six who each volunteer their own teaching techniques.

Fluttershy attempts to teach Wonderbolts history through a theatrical performance starring the pets. Pinkie Pie creates a catchy rap song about Wonderbolts history, while Rarity tries using historical fashion. Applejack admits she has no study advice since she learns everything through hands-on experience. Rainbow feels overwhelmed by all the conflicting methods and is convinced that she is "too dumb to learn anything."

Rainbow flies off in frustration, and Twilight follows to apologize for overwhelming her friend, but during their conversation Rainbow instinctively pushes Twilight out of the path of an oncoming helicopter. When Twilight asks how she noticed the danger while focused on their discussion, Rainbow reveals her natural ability to multitask by monitoring multiple things simultaneously: she had observed the Cutie Mark Crusaders leaving Sugarcube Corner and Big McIntosh conducting business with Filthy Rich while talking to Twilight.

Twilight develops a plan to teach her "Rainbow Dash's way" by taking advantage of her multitasking abilities during flight. She positions various ponies throughout Ponyville to casually present Wonderbolts historical facts during a seemingly casual flying tour, which allows Rainbow to absorb the information naturally. Rainbow effortlessly recalls all the historical details afterward and earns a perfect score on her exam.

== Reception ==
Sherilyn Connelly, the author of Ponyville Confidential, gave the episode a "B+" rating.

In a critical analysis of the episode, author Jen A. Blue praised writer Amy Keating Rogers and described it as "the most overtly and straightforwardly political 'Letter to Celestia' in the show's run." Blue analyzed the episode as a critique of educational systems that fail to accommodate different learning styles and wrote that Rainbow Dash's struggle with traditional academic methods like textbooks and lectures leads her to briefly declare herself "dumb" when the real issue is that her unique learning style requires hyperawareness and recall while flying. Blue wrote that society tends to treat children who don't fit "normal" learning styles as having individual deficits rather than recognizing institutional failures. Blue positioned the episode as intensely political and wrote that it demonstrates how accommodating diverse learning styles requires more funding and resources for education, and concluded that the episode presents "a straightforward ethical imperative" that every child should be given a chance to succeed, even when their minds have unusual gifts that don't respond to conventional teaching methods.

Daniel Alvarez of Unleash The Fanboy gave the episode a rating of 6 out of 10 and called it "[Rogers'] weakest episode yet", criticizing Rainbow Dash's portrayal as annoying and painful to listen to. Alvarez praised Pinkie Pie's The Fresh Prince of Bel-Air homage and the episode's message about different learning styles but felt Rainbow Dash was poorly written throughout the first half. Jamie Kingston of WomenWriteAboutComics wrote that the episode "knocked it out of the park" and analyzed how Rainbow Dash's learning struggles suggest she has ADHD or dyslexia, connecting it to the earlier episode "Read It and Weep" where Dash dismissed reading as an "egghead" pursuit. Kingston highlighted the importance of the show's representation of learning disabled ponies without making them less capable, writing that "placing handicapped ponies and learning disabled ponies in stories without making them any less capable shines a light on how important representation is for people who are atypical in any way."

== See also ==
- List of My Little Pony: Friendship Is Magic episodes
