= Pinkie Apple Pie =

- My Little Pony: Friendship Is Magic episode
- Episode no.: Season 4 Episode 9
- Written by: Natasha Levinger
- Original air date: January 11, 2014
- Running time: 22 minutes

Episode chronology
| ← Previous "Rarity Takes Manehattan" | Next → "Rainbow Falls" |
- My Little Pony: Friendship Is Magic season 4

"Pinkie Apple Pie" is the ninth episode of the fourth season of the animated television series My Little Pony: Friendship Is Magic. The episode was written by Natasha Levinger. It originally aired on The Hub on January 11, 2014. In this episode, Pinkie Pie discovers a genealogy scroll suggesting she may be related to the Apple family.

== Plot ==
External videos
- Pinkie Apple Pie (full episode) — Official upload of the episode onto YouTube

Pinkie Pie discovers a genealogy scroll at the Golden Oak Library that suggests she might be related to the Apple family, prompting her to excitedly visit Sweet Apple Acres and greet Applejack as her "cousin." Though the scroll's handwriting appears smudged and difficult to read, Granny Smith suggests they visit Goldie Delicious, who maintains an extensive collection of Apple family records at her remote cabin. Determined to make a good impression on their potential new family member, Applejack asks everyone to behave during the journey and sing a song ("Apples to the Core"), but their overloaded cart soon collapses.

The family continues their expedition by constructing a makeshift raft from the cart's remains and traveling down a river toward Goldie's cabin. Apple Bloom accidentally drops their map overboard while celebrating, and Granny Smith steers them into what she calls the "scariest cave in Equestria." The Apple family members struggle to contain their frustrations and maintain their best behavior in front of Pinkie, but tensions eventually boil over when they fight for control of the steering wheel and send it overboard just before plunging over a waterfall.

After their raft breaks apart and they complete the journey on foot, the exhausted group arrives at Goldie's cabin only to find her away on errands. While Pinkie goes to gather scrapbook paper, the Apple family members privately apologize to each other for their poor behavior during the trip and worry that their bickering has convinced Pinkie she doesn't want to be part of their family. When Pinkie returns and reveals she overheard their conversation, she declares that she wants to be an Apple more than ever because she witnessed how they take responsibility for their mistakes and stick together through difficult times.

Goldie Delicious returns and retrieves the Apple family genealogy book, but the crucial page proves too smudged to determine whether Pinkie is actually related to the Apples. Nonetheless, Applejack asserts that Pinkie is an "Apple to the core" regardless of blood relation. Back in Ponyville, they begin writing in their friendship journal about how family bonds are built through shared struggles rather than perfection, but soon start arguing over who should write the entry—with Pinkie happily joining in on the argument.

== Reception ==
Sherilyn Connelly, the author of Ponyville Confidential, gave the episode a "B-" rating.

In a critical analysis of the episode, author Jen A. Blue noted the brief appearance of Slender Man at the 17:05 mark and interpreted his presence as representing "the specter of adulthood" stalking Pinkie Pie, who is the most childlike of the Mane Six. Blue analyzed the episode as showing Pinkie Pie attempting to regain her "remembering self" by exploring her ancestry, arguing that "joining the Apples, in other words, is Pinkie's first real attempt to fix the misery of her childhood rather than hide from it" rather than simply enjoying the present as she typically does. Blue described the pairing of Pinkie and Applejack as complementary: Applejack needs more immediacy and fun while Pinkie needs to build good memories. Blue concluded that Pinkie's search for a chosen family represents "probably the most adult thing she's ever done," allowing her to defeat and absorb the specter of adulthood that Slender Man represents.

Kieran Hair, writing in WhatCulture, criticized the episode for teaching the lesson that "If twice you don't succeed, just give up and never talk about it again," arguing that while the episode contains good morals about family and friendship, Pinkie and the Apples give up trying to determine their relationship after two failures and barely mention the topic again throughout the series. He noted that they could have explored other alternatives, such as investigating their human counterparts through Twilight, but chose to accept defeat instead of continuing their search.

Brendan Kachel of flayrah called the episode's ambiguous ending "a bold choice for a kid's show" and noted that while it has nothing to do with the main story arc, it remained a fun episode nonetheless. Kachel compared the main characters' journey to visit Goldie Delicious to the 1983 movie National Lampoon's Vacation and observed subtle hints that Pinkie and the Apple family historian share certain abilities.

Ed Liu of Anime Superhero News found the episode "surprisingly lackluster, considering the comedic potential of throwing just about any two ponies together for a trouble-laden road trip." Daniel Alvarez of Unleash The Fanboy gave the episode a rating of 3.5 out of 5 and called it "might be the weakest episode of Season 4," criticizing that the central question of whether Pinkie and Applejack are related is left unresolved with no real payoff. Alvarez noted that while the episode is still fun and has good morals about family, viewers are left with the same answer from the beginning and questioned why the idea was brought up in the first place.

Sofie Liv of The Agony Booth gave the episode a rating of 4 out of 5 and called it "an excellent standout episode," praising the song "Apples to the Core" as probably her favorite song of the whole season and remarking that putting Pinkie Pie into the Apple family mix "just works." She praised the episode's message about family and said wrote that she was able to relate to much of it while enjoying the many jokes throughout. Raymond Gallant of Freakin' Awesome Network gave the episode a rating of 9.5 out of 10 and called it "a great adventure/buddy/road trip episode" that was funny, never felt boring, and never felt rushed. He praised the song "Apples to the Core" as possibly the best song of the season and described the episode as "one of the show's best episodes in a long time."

== See also ==
- List of My Little Pony: Friendship Is Magic episodes
