= Equestria Games =

- My Little Pony: Friendship Is Magic episode
- Episode no.: Season 4 Episode 24
- Written by: Dave Polsky
- Original air date: May 3, 2014
- Running time: 22 minutes

Episode chronology
← Previous "Inspiration Manifestation"	Next → "Twilight's Kingdom"
- My Little Pony: Friendship Is Magic season 4

"Equestria Games" is the twenty-fourth episode of the fourth season of the animated television series My Little Pony: Friendship Is Magic. The episode was written by Dave Polsky. It originally aired on The Hub on May 3, 2014. In this episode, Spike is chosen to light the torch at the opening ceremony of the Equestria Games.

== Plot ==
The Ponyville teams arrive at the Crystal Empire for the Equestria Games, where Spike discovers that he is celebrated as a hero for his role in defeating King Sombra and is known throughout the empire as "Great and Honorable Spike the Brave and Glorious." Princess Cadance asks him to light the ceremonial torch during the opening ceremony, an honor Spike eagerly accepts since he can breathe fire as a dragon. However, when the moment arrives and he stands before the massive crowd in the stadium, Spike becomes overwhelmed by stage fright and finds himself unable to produce even a small flame.

As the crowd grows restless from the delay, Twilight discreetly casts a spell to light the torch for Spike, allowing the games to begin successfully. When Twilight privately reveals that she helped him, Spike believes he has let down all of Equestria and retreats in shame from his heroic reputation. Desperate to redeem himself, Spike volunteers to sing the victory anthem after the aerial relay event, not realizing he needs to perform Cloudsdale's anthem since the Wonderbolts won rather than Ponyville. His awkward, improvised version with incorrect lyrics creates uncomfortable silence throughout the stadium.

During the final ice archery competition, an archer accidentally shoots an arrow into the sky that turns a cloud into a massive block of ice threatening to crush the spectators below. With the pegasus guards unable to divert the falling ice and security spells preventing unicorns from using magic, Spike leaps onto the backs of flying pegasi and unleashes a blast of fire that melts the ice into harmless water and steam. Though others praise his heroic actions, Spike feels no pride because he simply did "what needed to be done" rather than seeking glory. Princess Cadance asks him to light the closing ceremony fireworks, and this time Spike performs confidently.

== Broadcast and reception ==
=== Ratings ===
"Equestria Games" aired on May 3, 2014, on the Hub Network. According to the Nielsen household ratings, the episode was viewed by 413,000 people and watched by approximately 0.2 percent of households in the United States.

=== Critical reception ===
Sherilyn Connelly, the author of Ponyville Confidential, gave the episode a "B" rating.

In a critical analysis of the episode, author Jen A. Blue described "Equestria Games" as achieving the "rare feat of a Good Spike Episode" by having Spike address his problems rather than being a jerk to others, and wrote that he "manages to not be a jerk to anyone else for an entire episode." Blue analyzed the episode as exploring the damage of saving versus helping and compared it to the episode "It Ain't Easy Being Breezies" but with the "saved" character as the main focus, and contrasted Twilight's harmful act of saving Spike by lighting the torch with her later helpful approach of actually talking to him about what he needs. Blue argued that Spike internalizes the difference between saving and helping through his experiences, wanting to become a helper rather than a savior, and positioned the episode as almost like a key episode for Spike since it explores the fail-state of Helping, his closest equivalent to an Element of Harmony.

Daniel Alvarez of Unleash The Fanboy gave the episode a rating of 8 out of 10 and called it "solid". He wrote that he was disappointed because it was not the grand Equestria Games event that was expected, with the actual Games taking a backseat to Spike's story. He praised the great message about compliments being meaningless if you do not believe in yourself and wrote that Spike making up the Cloudsdale anthem was "priceless", calling it potentially "the funniest thing of the season."

== See also ==
- List of My Little Pony: Friendship Is Magic episodes
