= Somepony to Watch Over Me =

- My Little Pony: Friendship Is Magic episode
- Apple Bloom (left) is confronted by the chimera (right).
- Episode no.: Season 4 Episode 17
- Written by: Scott Sonneborn
- Original air date: March 8, 2014
- Running time: 22 minutes

Guest appearance
- Ellen Kennedy as the Chimera (all three heads)

Episode chronology
| ← Previous "It Ain't Easy Being Breezies" | Next → "Maud Pie" |
- My Little Pony: Friendship Is Magic season 4

"Somepony to Watch Over Me" is the seventeenth episode of the fourth season of the animated television series My Little Pony: Friendship Is Magic. The episode was written by Scott Sonneborn. It originally aired on The Hub on March 8, 2014. In this episode, Apple Bloom attempts to prove her independence when Applejack becomes overprotective and childproofs the farm.

== Plot ==
External videos
- Somepony to Watch Over Me (full episode) — Official upload of the episode onto YouTube

Applejack, Big McIntosh, and Granny Smith agree that Apple Bloom can manage the afternoon chores by herself. The Apple family members depart on their respective errands: Applejack and Big Mac to deliver pies to distant towns, and Granny Smith to visit their great aunt. Apple Bloom completes all the tasks on Applejack's lengthy chore list and looks forward to enjoying some well-deserved free time.

However, Applejack's worries get the better of her and she returns home to check on Apple Bloom, startling her sister and causing a kitchen accident that convinces Applejack that supervision is necessary. Despite Apple Bloom's protests, Applejack becomes increasingly overprotective, wrapping pillows around the rake and implementing absurd safety measures for every simple task. Apple Bloom attempts to demonstrate her competence through yard work and apple bucking, but Applejack's excessive mollycoddling only makes normal activities frustrating.

Apple Bloom enlists Scootaloo and Sweetie Belle to help her sneak out with the pie cart to complete the delivery mission herself. The two fillies disguise themselves as a sleeping Apple Bloom while she escapes through the window. Unfortunately, Scootaloo's excitement reveals the ruse, and a horrified Applejack discovers that Apple Bloom has ventured alone into dangerous territory without proper equipment.

Apple Bloom encounters a three-headed chimera in a fire geyser-filled swamp that burns her map and chases her through the dangerous terrain. Applejack arrives just as the monster corners her sister and expertly subdues each head. After rescuing Apple Bloom and safely delivering the pies to their grateful Cajun pony customers, Applejack promises to trust her independence and Apple Bloom accepts that some situations require asking for help.

== Reception ==
Sherilyn Connelly, the author of Ponyville Confidential, gave the episode a "B-" rating but called it (along with "Maud Pie" and "For Whom the Sweetie Belle Toils") a "terrific run about sisterhood".

In a critical analysis of the episode, author Jen A. Blue argued that "Somepony to Watch Over Me" continues themes from the previous episode ("It Ain't Easy Being Breezies") about saving versus helping, but shifts focus to the victim's perspective rather than the savior's, writing that "from Apple Bloom's perspective, Applejack isn't saying, 'I love you,' she's saying 'I don't trust you.'" Blue analyzed how excessive care can be damaging to self-worth, as meaningful achievement requires the possibility of failure, and wrote that the episode includes several gags poking fun at show conventions, including the chimera's role as a twisted reflection of the Cutie Mark Crusaders as a three-headed group. Blue observed that this episode breaks the usual Cutie Mark Crusader formula since Apple Bloom was right all along and Applejack is the one who learns the lesson instead, effectively making it an Applejack episode told from an outside perspective. Blue concluded that while the episode offers a fresh perspective on not imposing unwanted assistance, it ultimately has little to offer beyond its four gags, particularly since Applejack showed no prior signs of overprotectiveness and her behavior after the episode would be indistinguishable from before.

Daniel Alvarez of Unleash The Fanboy gave the episode a rating of 6 out of 10 and called it "definitely the season's weakest". He criticized Applejack's portrayal as the worst the show had ever seen and described it as horrendous and overly slapstick. Alvarez praised Apple Bloom's characterization and the debut of the chimera but wrote that the episode was generally weak and would not go down as a classic. Sofie Liv of The Agony Booth gave the episode a rating of 3 out of 5 and called it "a pretty entertaining sit," praising how the story was well-handled and appreciating the episode's focus on sisterhood. Live wrote that she enjoyed the episode overall but felt the chimera was not quite as cool as it could have been.

== See also ==
- List of My Little Pony: Friendship Is Magic episodes
