= Bats! (My Little Pony: Friendship Is Magic) =

- My Little Pony: Friendship Is Magic episode
- Fluttershy is transformed into a vampire bat.
- Episode no.: Season 4 Episode 7
- Written by: Merriwether Williams
- Original air date: December 28, 2013
- Running time: 22 minutes

Episode chronology
← Previous "Power Ponies"	Next → "Rarity Takes Manehattan"
- My Little Pony: Friendship Is Magic season 4

"Bats!" is the seventh episode of the fourth season of the animated television series My Little Pony: Friendship Is Magic. The episode was written by Merriwether Williams. It originally aired on The Hub on December 28, 2013. In this episode, Applejack discovers that vampire fruit bats have infested Sweet Apple Acres and wants to get rid of them.

== Plot ==
External videos
- Bats! (full episode) — Official upload of the episode onto YouTube

Applejack eagerly anticipates Apple Bucking Day but discovers that vampire fruit bats have invaded Sweet Apple Acres and drained the juice from all the apples, leaving only shriveled husks behind. She calls the rest of the Mane Six for help to drive away the bats before they can destroy her prize apple intended for an upcoming produce competition. Fluttershy advocates for a peaceful solution where the bats can inhabit part of the orchard, pointing out that their seed-spitting actually helps new apple trees grow, but Applejack insists on completely removing the creatures from her property ("Bats").

The other ponies side with Applejack, and Twilight suggests a compromise through magic that will make the bats lose their appetite for apples entirely. Despite her discomfort, Fluttershy agrees to use her Stare to hold them still while Twilight casts the spell, which appears to work when the bats show no further interest in the fruit.

The next morning, Applejack discovers more drained apples. However, the vampire fruit bats remain completely uninterested in apples, leaving the ponies baffled. They organize a nighttime stakeout to catch the culprit and split up to search different areas of the orchard for unusual activity. To their surprise, they discover Fluttershy perched upside-down on a branch, sucking juice from apples with bat-like wings and aggressive behavior (which the ponies call "Flutterbat"). Twilight realizes that her spell accidentally transferred the vampire fruit bats' nature into Fluttershy while she was using her Stare on them. The ponies successfully trap the transformed Fluttershy using mirrors and her attraction to Applejack's prize apple as bait, which allows Twilight to reverse the spell and restore her friend to normal.

Applejack apologizes to Fluttershy for not listening to her original suggestion and agrees to designate part of the orchard specifically for the vampire fruit bats. The two friends write in their journal about the importance of not letting others pressure you into doing something you believe is wrong, and that compromise and coexistence often work better than exclusion.

== Reception ==
Sherilyn Connelly, the author of Ponyville Confidential, gave the episode a "B" rating. Daniel Alvarez of Unleash The Fanboy gave the episode a rating of 3.5 out of 5 and called it "no all-star, but definitely fun because of FLUTTERBAT," praising the vampire Fluttershy transformation as awesome and noting it gave the episode a boost of excitement. He wrote that "Without Flutterbat, 'BATS!' would have been another average Season 4 episode" and criticized the moral as being randomly thrown in at the end. Brian Truitt of USA Today called the episode "chilling" in a "kid-friendly way".

In a critical analysis of the episode, author Jen A. Blue called "Bats!" "delightful" and argued it was "a strong episode in its own right" that echoed themes from the season premiere through concepts of corruption and dark mirrors. Blue analyzed the episode through a kabbalistic framework and examined how Applejack and Fluttershy represent the sefirot of Chesed and Gevurah respectively, and argued that Flutterbat serves as a qlippothic reflection of Fluttershy, which embodies "the impulse to devour and consume" rather than loving-kindness. Blue interpreted the episode's message about the bats' destruction being beneficial to the trees as representing putrefaction, "the creative power of decay, the emergence of life from death and value from rot," concluding that "the corruption and decay of something pure is not inherently evil, and may make it purer and better."

Rae Grimes of Comic Book Resources ranked "Bats!" as the third best song in Friendship Is Magic. She noted that this was the only song in the show where Applejack and Fluttershy were at odds with each other, and described it as "an incredibly catchy song as well as one of the more memorable, simply because members of the Mane Six usually don't fight in musical numbers."

Sofie Liv of The Agony Booth gave the episode a rating of 2.5 out of 5 and called it "a mixed bag, and pretty average for My Little Pony," praising the song "Stop the Bats" as the highlight. Liv criticized the episode's message for being obscured by the fact that Fluttershy was actually in the wrong about the bat infestation and commented that the lesson about standing up for yourself had been told better in previous episodes.

== See also ==
- List of My Little Pony: Friendship Is Magic episodes
