= Leap of Faith (My Little Pony: Friendship Is Magic) =

- My Little Pony: Friendship Is Magic episode
- The Flim and Flam brothers convince Granny Smith to purchase their miracle tonic.
- Episode no.: Season 4 Episode 20
- Written by: Josh Haber
- Original air date: March 29, 2014
- Running time: 22 minutes

Episode chronology
← Previous "For Whom the Sweetie Belle Toils"	Next → "Testing Testing 1, 2, 3"
- My Little Pony: Friendship Is Magic season 4

"Leap of Faith" is the twentieth episode of the fourth season of the animated television series My Little Pony: Friendship Is Magic. The episode was written by Josh Haber. It originally aired on The Hub on March 29, 2014. In this episode, Flim and Flam return to Ponyville selling a fake miracle tonic.

== Plot ==
External videos
- Leap of Faith (full episode) — Official upload of the episode onto YouTube

The Apple family visits a local swimming hole, but Granny Smith remains on the sidelines despite her legendary past as a champion swimmer and high diver, too old and achy to participate in the fun with her grandchildren. On their way back to Ponyville, they encounter a crowd of ponies gathered at a circus tent where the notorious Flim and Flam brothers have returned with their latest scheme: a miracle tonic that supposedly heals any ailment. Despite Applejack and Big McIntosh's immediate suspicion, Granny Smith purchases a bottle after witnessing their demonstration.

The tonic appears to work miraculous wonders on Granny Smith, transforming her from a frail elderly mare into someone with the energy and agility of a young pony. Applejack discovers that the pony who was part of Flim and Flam's demonstration, Silver Shill, is actually part of Flim and Flam's con game. When she confronts the brothers about their scam, they admit the tonic contains nothing but apple juice and beet leaves, but argue that Granny Smith's happiness justifies the deception.

Applejack reluctantly keeps quiet about the fraud and even accidentally endorses the tonic when Granny credits it for her improved swimming abilities. Later, Granny and Apple Bloom enter the Ponyville swim meet together and deliver a perfect synchronized swimming performance that earns them top scores and generates even more publicity for Flim and Flam.

Granny Smith attempts to break the Equestria high-diving record by jumping into a tiny container of water, which would likely result in serious injury or death. Applejack intervenes and finally tells the truth. She explains that Granny's improvements came from confidence and positive thinking rather than a magical cure. Silver Shill, inspired by Applejack's courage, also confesses his role in the scam, forcing Flim and Flam to retreat once again as their con game collapses and the deceived customers demand refunds.

== Reception ==
Sherilyn Connelly, the author of Ponyville Confidential, gave the episode a "B" rating.

In a critical analysis of the episode, author Jen A. Blue described "Leap of Faith" as largely about the importance of skepticism and extending honesty not just to interactions with others but to oneself, writing that Applejack faces a rare actual dilemma between not wanting to hurt Granny Smith and her drive to be honest. Blue analyzed the episode as a philosophical exploration of what it means to be truthful and wrote that Applejack's mistake was "treating Flim and Flam's 'miracle cure' like an article of faith" rather than acknowledging material reality, and positioned the episode as a response to "Feeling Pinkie Keen" where belief in falsehood nearly brings harm rather than closed-mindedness causing harm. Blue connected the episode to the sefira of Gevura (strength), remarking that it is "the least spiritual episode in the key arc" because it focuses on judgment and separating out false or harmful elements, establishing that "the role of the spiritual is here established to be in shaping our perceptions and attitudes, but only material action can shape the material." Blue concluded that the episode demonstrates it is fine to believe in things like confidence-boosting drinks, but only when one understands the belief itself provides the benefit, not the drink.

Daniel Alvarez of Unleash The Fanboy gave the episode a rating of 8.5 out of 10 and called it "a pretty solid Applejack episode". He praised the return of the Flim Flam brothers and wrote that they were better written than in their previous appearance in "The Super Speedy Cider Squeezy 6000". Alvarez wrote that he found it interesting how the episode explored how even a pony representing honesty can be pressured internally into lying, and praised the overall message of the episode. Jamie Kingston of WomenWriteAboutComics praised the episode's inclusion of ponies with disabilities.

== See also ==
- List of My Little Pony: Friendship Is Magic episodes
