= Simple Ways =

- My Little Pony: Friendship Is Magic episode
- Rarity (left) attempts to get Trenderhoof's (center) attention away from Applejack (right).
- Episode no.: Season 4 Episode 13
- Written by: Josh Haber
- Original air date: February 8, 2014
- Running time: 22 minutes

Episode chronology
← Previous "Pinkie Pride"	Next → "Filli Vanilli"
- My Little Pony: Friendship Is Magic season 4

"Simple Ways" is the thirteenth episode of the fourth season of the animated television series My Little Pony: Friendship Is Magic. The episode was written by Josh Haber. It originally aired on The Hub on February 8, 2014. In this episode, Rarity is elected to host the Ponyville Days festival and becomes smitten with travel writer Trenderhoof, but when he falls for Applejack instead, Rarity attempts to change herself to win his affections.

== Plot ==
External videos
- Simple Ways (full episode) — Official upload of the episode onto YouTube

Rarity wins the honor of serving as pony of ceremonies for the upcoming Ponyville Days festival and presents plans including a cider auction, town square gala, and fashion show. Her primary motivation involves impressing the famous travel writer Trenderhoof, whom she has admired from afar. When Trenderhoof arrives at the train station, Rarity becomes so nervous that she hides under Twilight's tail and faints upon their introduction.

Rarity proudly tours Trenderhoof around Ponyville to showcase her festival venues, but she becomes dismayed when he becomes instantly smitten with Applejack at Sweet Apple Acres. Trenderhoof declares the farm pony "the pony of his dreams" and begins following her around town, much to Applejack's growing discomfort. Despite Rarity's attempts to capture his attention, Trenderhoof remains fixated on Applejack's country lifestyle.

Convinced that Applejack has deliberately stolen Trenderhoof's affections, Rarity abandons her sophisticated persona and adopts a country accent while completely redesigning the festival around a "Simple Ways" farm theme. She wears overalls and a straw hat and praises the virtues of hard work and rural life. Applejack grows increasingly annoyed by both Trenderhoof's unwanted attention and Rarity's accusations that she's intentionally competing for his affections.

Applejack appears at Sweet Apple Acres dressed as "Apple Jewel" in an elaborate gown, attempting to beat Rarity at her own game by embracing high fashion and refined culture. The two friends engage in an absurd competition where Rarity praises mud and split ends while Applejack extols polished hooves and rosebuds, until Rarity accidentally splashes mud on Applejack's dress and snaps back to reality. She apologizes for her behavior and thanks Applejack for helping her realize how ridiculous she's been acting.

Trenderhoof appears in farm clothes announcing his plan to abandon travel writing and become a farmer, and Rarity advises him against changing himself so drastically just to impress someone else. The festival proceeds with Rarity's original "small town chic" theme and proves highly successful. Trenderhoof dances with Granny Smith and gives Rarity a rose during the fashion show.

== Reception ==
Sherilyn Connelly, the author of Ponyville Confidential, gave the episode an "A-" rating.

In a critical analysis of the episode, author Jen A. Blue initially expressed hatred for love triangles but argued that "Simple Ways" subverts the typical format because "this love triangle isn't about Applejack and Rarity competing for his affections" but rather about Rarity choosing between pursuing Trenderhoof and maintaining her friendship with Applejack. Blue interpreted the episode as acknowledging that the real pairing is Rarity–Applejack, noting this is as close as the show would get to acknowledging homosexuality and remarked that "Rarijack is now the next best thing to canon." Blue criticized the concept of crushes as shallow fantasies based on limited information, arguing that neither Rarity nor Trenderhoof is interested in actually getting to know the object of their infatuation, and concluded that the episode delivers a message to fans that "you cannot love someone you do not know" since genuine caring requires a reciprocating relationship rather than fantasy-based infatuation.

Raymond Gallant of Freakin' Awesome Network gave the episode a rating of 9 out of 10 and called it "a fun episode" and "one of the best of season 4." He praised Tabitha St. Germain's vocal performance as Rarity and noted that Applejack was in top form, though he criticized Trenderhoof as unremarkable and forgettable compared to other ponies Rarity had shown affection for. Sofie Liv of The Agony Booth gave the episode a rating of 2 out of 5 ponies and called it "nice, but didn't stand out as anything special and doesn't really have any lasting impact." She described the episode as average for the show and noted that while the message was good, the story felt old and had been done many times before, making it "kind of dull" and below average for the series. Daniel Alvarez of Unleash The Fanboy gave the episode a rating of 3.5 out of 5 and called it "a relatively weak episode but was saved by Tabitha St. Germain's incredible voice acting" and praised Applejack using Rarity's trick against her. Alvarez noted that while the first half was the weakest of the season, the final part made it rise above and described it as the weakest Rarity episode yet, though still a fun watch. Jamie Kingston of WomenWriteAboutComics praised the episode's lesson of "being yourself and not trying to change yourself to suit another".

Johnnie Jungleguts of Yahoo! Entertainment ranked "Simple Ways" the ninth best episode of My Little Pony, describing how hipster photojournalist Trenderhoof comes to town and chic unicorn Rarity becomes "desperate to impress" him, only to discover he prefers Applejack's rustic farm-pony aesthetic over Rarity's high-end style. Jungleguts noted that Rarity responds by adopting "bumpkin stereotypes, donning frayed overalls and a laughable Southern accent," and praised the episode as "acute" for reflecting "on authenticity in a pony world that can be just as image-conscious as our own."

== See also ==
- List of My Little Pony: Friendship Is Magic episodes
