= Castle Mane-ia =

- My Little Pony: Friendship Is Magic episode
- The abandoned Castle of the Two Sisters.
- Episode no.: Season 4 Episode 3
- Written by: Josh Haber
- Original air date: November 30, 2013
- Running time: 22 minutes

Episode chronology
← Previous "Princess Twilight Sparkle"	Next → "Daring Don't"
- My Little Pony: Friendship Is Magic season 4

"Castle Mane-ia" is the third episode of the fourth season of the animated television series My Little Pony: Friendship Is Magic. The episode was written by Josh Haber. It is the 68th episode of the series overall, and aired on The Hub on November 30, 2013. In this episode, the Mane Six separately visit Princess Celestia and Princess Luna's old castle for different reasons.

The title of the episode is a reference to the Castlevania video game series.

== Plot ==
External videos
- Castle Mane-ia (full episode) — Official upload of the episode onto YouTube

Twilight Sparkle travels to the abandoned Castle of the Two Sisters on Princess Celestia's suggestion to research the mysterious chest from the Tree of Harmony. She discovers an intact library where she and Spike settle in for a night of study. Meanwhile, Rainbow Dash and Applejack decide to prove who is the braver of the two by spending the night in the supposedly haunted castle. Separately, Rarity convinces Fluttershy to help her collect old tapestries from the ruins for restoration, while Pinkie Pie abandons her bell-ringing duties at the school to gather flowers in the Everfree Forest.

The castle's ancient mechanisms begin separating the ponies as they explore different areas of the crumbling structure. Fluttershy accidentally triggers a rotating wall that temporarily traps her and Rarity in a hidden room, causing Fluttershy's pet bunny Angel to panic and run off into the castle depths. Rainbow Dash and Applejack encounter moving tapestries and disembodied hooves emerging from walls, convinced that they are witnessing supernatural phenomena related to Granny Smith's stories about the "Pony of Shadows" that supposedly haunts the ruins after dark.

As night falls, mysterious organ music begins echoing through the corridors, triggering various trap doors and further scattering the frightened ponies throughout the castle. Rarity, Fluttershy, Rainbow Dash, and Applejack unknowingly bump into each other in the darkness and assume they're encountering ghosts or monsters, leading to them becoming absolutely hysterical and panicking. Twilight hears the commotion and uses her magic to freeze everyone in place, finally reuniting the group and calming their fears when they realize they've been scaring each other all night.

Following the organ music to its source, the ponies discover that the mysterious cloaked figure playing the instrument is actually Pinkie Pie, who followed them into the castle thinking that they were having a group party. Back in the library, Twilight shares how reading "The Journal of the Two Sisters" helped her understand the castle's history and made the experience less frightening. She suggests they keep their own friendship journal to help each other learn and cope with future challenges. The other ponies agree. However, now Pinkie’s Pie discarded cloak has been picked up by something else lurking in the dark. Its glowing yellow eyes appear, then stare menacingly at the viewer, ending the episode.

== Reception ==
Sherilyn Connelly, the author of Ponyville Confidential, gave the episode a "B+" rating. Daniel Alvarez of Unleash The Fanboy gave the episode a rating of 3.5 out of 5 and described it as "definitely fun" but noted it "won't be making classic status anytime soon," comparing it to a Scooby-Doo episode with its plot twist regarding the Pony of Shadows. Alvarez praised the unique concept of having the ponies in the castle without knowing others were there, commended the writing for Rarity and Twilight, and noted that while there was "a lot of running and yelling," the episode featured great writing and established an interesting new status quo change. Brian Truitt of USA Today called the episode "chilling" in a "kid-friendly way".

In a critical analysis of the episode, author Jen A. Blue described "Castle Mane-ia" as "more interesting than entertaining" and praised its complex structure with three intertwining stories that interact physically rather than simply sharing a common origin like previous multi-story episodes. Blue analyzed the episode's place within the fourth season's unified arc, noting how it immediately picks up from "Princess Twilight Sparkle" with the mystery box and introduces the Journal of the Two Sisters as a replacement for letters to Princess Celestia. Blue interpreted the title of the episode as a dual pun referencing both "mania" and the Castlevania video game series, arguing that the castle's aesthetic evokes elements of Hammer Horror and that the shadowy cloaked figure foreshadows the later appearance of Tirek. Blue wrote that the fourth season was a more unified season closer to show creator Lauren Faust's original vision: "the idealized form of the series intended by its creator, but assembled by others."

Film and television critic Callie Petch gave the episode an "A" grade and called it "a freakin' clinic in comedy, being utterly hysterical from start to finish," praising first-time series writer Josh Haber for creating a script that felt like it came from someone who had been with the show since day one. Petch described it as "one of the best episodes in the show's entire run" and commended the voice work, particularly Ashleigh Ball's performance, as well as the storyboarding by Emmett Hall and Tony Cliff. Megan Crouse of Den of Geek used the episode as an example of how Friendship Is Magic is a high fantasy: the episode shows the ruins of the sisters' old castle, conjuring up a medieval setting and a sense of loss like Théoden's in The Lord of the Rings.

== See also ==
- List of My Little Pony: Friendship Is Magic episodes
