= Inspiration Manifestation =

- My Little Pony: Friendship Is Magic episode
- Episode no.: Season 4 Episode 23
- Written by: Corey Powell; Meghan McCarthy
- Original air date: April 26, 2014
- Running time: 22 minutes

Episode chronology
← Previous "Trade Ya!"	Next → "Equestria Games"
- My Little Pony: Friendship Is Magic season 4

"Inspiration Manifestation" is the twenty-third episode of the fourth season of the animated television series My Little Pony: Friendship Is Magic. The episode was written by Corey Powell and Meghan McCarthy. It originally aired on The Hub on April 26, 2014. In this episode, Spike finds a magical spell book that gives Rarity the power to manifest her creative visions.

== Plot ==
Rarity creates an elaborate puppet theater for the Foal and Filly Fair but faces harsh criticism from Claude, the demanding puppeteer who calls her work "awful". Devastated, Rarity retreats to her boutique and spirals into depression. Determined to help restore Rarity's creative confidence, Spike travels to the Castle of the Two Sisters with Owlowiscious to search for a magical solution.

Spike discovers a hidden chamber behind a bookshelf containing a menacing stone spell book covered in spikes, which contains the "Inspiration Manifestation" spell that "instantly brings ideas to life." He brings the book to Rarity, who casts the spell and immediately transforms her magic aura to green while gaining the power to manifest any creative thought into reality. She successfully redesigns Claude's puppet theater to his satisfaction, earning his approval and making the fair a success. Spike suggests returning the book, but Rarity convinces him to let her keep it longer.

Rarity becomes obsessed with using the spell to "beautify" all of Ponyville according to her artistic vision, working through the night to create mountains of dresses and beginning a campaign of unwanted improvements throughout town. She transforms Applejack's simple apple cart into an impractical jeweled contraption, gives Rainbow Dash a cumbersome dress that interferes with her cloud-busting work, turns Fluttershy's bird house into a mansion that confuses its occupants, and replaces a foal's birthday party entertainment with "high class" alternative that displease everyone involved.

Seeing how the ponies are displeased by Rarity's changes, Spike attempts to steal the spell book back, but Rarity catches him and he swallows it to prevent her from retrieving it, only to discover that the spell continues working without the book. Rarity plans to spread her "creative genius" across all of Equestria. Finally, Spike musters the courage to tell Rarity that her changes are awful. His honest confession breaks the spell's hold as the incantation specified that "only when true words are spoken will you be set free." Rarity gives Spike a hug after telling him that he should never be afraid to tell her the truth.

At the Golden Oak Library, Twilight collapses onto her bed in exhaustion, after having cleaned up Rarity's mess. She scolds Spike for taking a book from the castle without permission. Being honest, Spike tells her "You don't look so good," which angers her.

== Development ==
In June 2013, writer Meghan McCarthy tweeted: "Rarity? Check. Spike? Check. Ridiculous early '90s pop culture reference? Check. #MLPSeason4". In a live interview on "Hub Network's What's the Hubbub?" with Tara Strong, McCarthy confirmed that she was referring to a nod to the 90's sitcom Saved By the Bell.

== Reception ==
Sherilyn Connelly, the author of Ponyville Confidential, gave the episode a "D" rating and used it as an example of an episode that did not feature adventure elements as a rebuttal to the notion that "nearly all" episodes are adventure stories.

In a critical analysis of the episode, author Jen A. Blue described "Inspiration Manifestation" as "surprisingly solid for a Spike episode" that is readable in multiple ways, starting with the surface reading about Spike learning that honest criticism is an important part of friendship. Blue explored an alternative reading of Spike's behavior as enabling, comparing Rarity's attachment to the magic to drug addiction and noting that Rarity's line "I'm so excited! I'm so excited!" could reference the infamous Saved by the Bell episode about caffeine pill addiction ("Jessie's Song"). Blue offered a third reading connecting the episode to the Tree of Life and wrote that the spell represents dark magic that circumvents the proper creative process by passing "directly from spark to matter" and positioning Spike as a serpentine figure tempting a woman away from the Tree of Life. Blue concluded that Spike's role parallels the biblical serpent but ultimately serves to restore Rarity through honest criticism and wrote that perfect interpersonal harmony is neither possible nor desirable: "the Tree of Harmony needs a little Discord."

Daniel Alvarez of Unleash The Fanboy gave the episode a rating of 7.5 out of 10 and called it "a solid episode" that was "much better than the previous episode, 'Trade Ya!'" He praised Spike's role and the background music but criticized the anti-climactic ending and felt the mysterious book was left unexplained.

== See also ==
- List of My Little Pony: Friendship Is Magic episodes
