= Maud Pie (My Little Pony: Friendship Is Magic episode) =

- My Little Pony: Friendship Is Magic episode
- Maud Pie introduces herself to the Mane Six.
- Episode no.: Season 4 Episode 18
- Written by: Noelle Benvenuti
- Original air date: March 15, 2014
- Running time: 22 minutes

Episode chronology
← Previous "Somepony to Watch Over Me"	Next → "For Whom the Sweetie Belle Toils"
- My Little Pony: Friendship Is Magic season 4

"Maud Pie" is the eighteenth episode of the fourth season of the animated television series My Little Pony: Friendship Is Magic. The episode was written by Noelle Benvenuti. It originally aired on The Hub on March 15, 2014. In this episode, Pinkie Pie introduces her friends to her stoic older sister Maud Pie.

== Plot ==
External videos
- Maud Pie (full episode) — Official upload of the episode onto YouTube

Pinkie Pie prepares for her older sister Maud's visit by creating mountains of rock candy at Sugarcube Corner, continuing their longtime tradition of making and trading rock candy necklaces. Pinkie organizes a lakeside picnic where Maud and her friends can get acquainted. However, Maud immediately puzzles her friends with her completely stoic demeanor, deadpan delivery, and unusual pet rock named Boulder.

Each friend attempts individual bonding sessions to connect with her: Rarity tries discussing fashion but discovers Maud prefers dirty dish towels to elegant fabrics; Fluttershy introduces her animal friends only to find Maud more interested in rocks; Twilight learns that Maud writes thousands of poems all exclusively about geological formations; Rainbow Dash challenges her to boulder-throwing competitions; Applejack discovers that Maud's version of "honesty" involves blunt, uncomfortable directness and that she peels apples by smashing them with rocks.

When her friends admit they have not been able to connect with Maud despite their efforts, Pinkie becomes visibly deflated and retreats to Sugarcube Corner alone. Desperate to bring everyone together, she constructs an elaborate obstacle course called "Pinkie-Rainbow-Rari-Twi-Apple-Flutter-Maud Fun Time" that combines all her friends' interests culminating in a dangerous rock slide. During her demonstration, Pinkie gets her hoof trapped between rocks just as a massive boulder breaks loose and tumbles toward her.

Maud races through the obstacle course at incredible speed and destroys the falling boulder with her bare hooves, saving Pinkie's life and leaving everyone speechless. Twilight realizes what they all share with Maud: an unconditional love for Pinkie Pie. At the train station, the friends give Maud rock candy necklaces for her journey, and Twilight discovers that Maud has saved every necklace Pinkie ever sent her without eating any because she doesn't actually like candy—but she does love Pinkie Pie. The episode concludes with Pinkie eating the candy necklaces.

== Reception ==
Sherilyn Connelly, the author of Ponyville Confidential, gave the episode an "A-" rating and called it (along with "Somepony to Watch Over Me" and "For Whom the Sweetie Belle Toils") a "terrific run about sisterhood".

In a critical analysis of the episode, author Jen A. Blue described Maud as "the most amazing thing I've ever seen" and "quite simply the funniest thing on the show to date," analyzing how her humor works through extreme deadpan delivery while saying and doing odd things. Blue compared Maud to April Ludgate from Parks and Recreation and wrote that while both use deadpan humor, Maud differs by not being cynical but instead having a passionate interest in rocks and a unique aesthetic that values directness and simplicity. Blue remarked that the Mane Six struggle with Maud because they all share emotional availability and expressive communication styles, while Maud's lack of affect and terse statements shut down conversation and conflict with their relational approaches. Blue criticized the episode's conclusion, since after setting up a lesson that "Friendship Is Not Transitive," the episode instead decided "by fiat that no, actually, it is transitive" by having the ponies become friends with Maud through their shared caring for Pinkie.

Daniel Alvarez of Unleash The Fanboy gave the episode a rating of 9 out of 10 and called it "great". He praised Maud as the true star of the show and called her interactions with the Mane Six were "priceless". Alvarez described "Maud Pie" as "definitely one of the more memorable episodes of Season 4 yet" and one of the funnier episodes of the season, praising the genuine sisterly bond between Pinkie and Maud despite their polar opposite personalities. Sofie Liv of The Agony Booth gave the episode a rating of 4.5 out of 5 and called Maud "a new favorite character," praising her deadpan comedy and noting that "it's rare to see a female character pull off deadpan comedy properly, but this lady not only pulled it off, she had it down to a tee!" Hillary Busis of Entertainment Weekly called Maud a pony version of Aubrey Plaza.

== See also ==
- List of My Little Pony: Friendship Is Magic episodes
