= My Little Pony: Friendship Is Magic season 4 =

My Little Pony: Friendship Is Magic
- Season 4
- DVD cover
- No. of episodes: 26

Release
- Original network: Hub Network
- Original release: November 23, 2013 – May 10, 2014

Season chronology
- ← Previous; Season 3 Next → Season 5

The fourth season of the animated television series My Little Pony: Friendship Is Magic, developed by Lauren Faust, originally aired on the Hub Network in the United States. The series is based on Hasbro's My Little Pony line of toys and animated works and is often referred by collectors to be the fourth generation, or "G4", of the My Little Pony franchise. Season 4 of the series premiered on November 23, 2013 on the Hub Network, an American pay television channel partly owned by Hasbro, and concluded on May 10, 2014.

The show follows a pony named Twilight Sparkle as she learns about friendship in the town of Ponyville. Twilight, who has just become an alicorn princess, continues to learn with her close friends Applejack, Rarity, Fluttershy, Rainbow Dash and Pinkie Pie. Each represents a different face of friendship, and Twilight discovers herself to be a key part of the magical artifacts, the Elements of Harmony. The ponies share adventures and help out other residents of Ponyville, while working out the troublesome moments in their friendships.

== Development ==
=== Concept ===
Season 4 continues from the events of the third season finale, "Magical Mystery Cure", where Twilight, shown to have come to hone her magic skills while learning the value of friendship, has been crowned as Equestria's newest princess, becoming an alicorn in the process. Some elements of the season focus on Twilight coming to terms with her new status; lead writer Meghan McCarthy stated that "What we didn't want to do was change who Twilight is as a character, because she's certainly someone that everyone's proud to know and love", while Tara Strong, the voice actress for Twilight, claimed that the episode is "a birth of a new era for Twilight, but not the end of what makes the show so wonderful". In addition, with the directive of the letters to Princess Celestia no longer in force, the six main characters also resolve to keep a collective journal of their formative experiences for posterity's sake. According to a Twitter post from McCarthy, the season also includes a story arc that features the ponies on the hunt to find keys to open a mysterious six locked chest. During the season, each of the ponies gets an episode dedicated to them and features a plot where they face a challenge related to their respective Elements of Harmony; by choosing to do the right thing and embrace their Element, they inspire another character to do the same and receive a gift which shimmers a rainbow glow, their key to the chest.

=== Production ===
Investment documents for DHX Media's 2012 financial year indicate that production for a fourth season had been financed. Before the season premiered, aspects of it were discussed by Meghan McCarthy, Tara Strong and other writers and voice actors at various fan conventions. Hasbro's vice president for international distribution, Finn Arnesen, had stated that My Little Pony is a "top-priority" brand for the company and expects the series to continue beyond the fourth season. The fourth season of the series premiered on November 23, 2013. This season marks the first time storyboard artist Jim Miller will be co-directing alongside Jayson Thiessen. This season also marks the first time to be executive produced by Thiessen and McCarthy.

== Cast ==
=== Main ===
- Tara Strong as Twilight Sparkle
  - Rebecca Shoichet as Twilight Sparkle (singing voice)
- Tabitha St. Germain as Rarity
  - Kazumi Evans as Rarity (singing voice)
- Ashleigh Ball as Applejack and Rainbow Dash
- Andrea Libman as Fluttershy and Pinkie Pie
  - Shannon Chan-Kent as Pinkie Pie (singing voice); Libman occasionally
- Cathy Weseluck as Spike
- Rebecca Shoichet as Sunset Shimmer

=== Recurring ===
- Nicole Oliver as Princess Celestia
- Tabitha St. Germain as Princess Luna
  - Kazumi Evans as Princess Luna (singing voice)
- The Cutie Mark Crusaders
  - Michelle Creber as Apple Bloom
  - Madeleine Peters as Scootaloo
  - Claire Corlett as Sweetie Belle
- Britt McKillip as Princess Cadance
- Andrew Francis as Shining Armor
- John de Lancie as Discord

=== Minor ===
- Brenda Crichlow as Zecora
- Chiara Zanni as Daring Do/A.K. Yearling
- Brian Drummond as Ahuizotl, Seabreeze and Mr. Cake
- Michael Dobson as Dr. Caballeron and Bulk Biceps
- Ashleigh Ball as Prim Hemline
- Tabitha St. Germain as Suri Polomare and Zipporwhill
- Cathy Weseluck as Coco Pommel
- Peter New as Big McIntosh
- Tabitha St. Germain as Granny Smith and Mrs. Cake
- Peter New as Goldie Delicious and Zipporwhill's father
- Kelly Metzger as Spitfire and Helia (Note: Metzger is credited as Blossomforth, a pegasus with the same design but different coloring than the pony that speaks.)
- Matt Hill as Soarin
- Andrea Libman as Fleetfoot
- Nicole Oliver as Cheerilee
- Chantal Strand as Diamond Tiara
- Shannon Chan-Kent as Silver Spoon
- Lee Tockar as Snips
- Richard Ian Cox as Snails
- Rena Anakwe as Sapphire Shores
- The Flim Flam Brothers
  - Samuel Vincent as Flim
  - Scott McNeil as Flam
- Veena Sood as Ms. Harshwhinny

=== Guest stars ===
- Ellen Kennedy as the Mane-iac and the Chimera
- Cathy Weseluck as Torch Song
  - Jerrica Santos as Torch Song (singing voice)
- Trevor Devall as Thunderlane
- "Weird Al" Yankovic as Cheese Sandwich
- Doron Bell as Trenderhoof
- Alvin Sanders as Flutterguy
  - Marcus Mosley as Flutterguy (singing voice)
- Danny Balkwill as Toe-Tapper
- Graham Verchere as Pipsqueak
- Ingrid Nilson as Maud Pie
- Ian James Corlett as Silver Shill
- Sylvain LeVasseur Portelance as Stellar Eclipse
- Jay Brazeau as Claude the Puppeteer
- Vincent Tong as Flash Sentry and Duke of Maretonia
- Mark Acheson as Lord Tirek

== Episodes ==
Each episode is directed by Jayson Thiessen with Jim Miller as co-director.

No. overall	No. in season	Title	Written by	Original release date	Prod. code	US viewers (millions)
66	1	"Princess Twilight Sparkle" (Parts 1 & 2)	Meghan McCarthy	November 23, 2013	401	0.73
67	2	"Princess Twilight Sparkle" (Parts 1 & 2)	Meghan McCarthy	November 23, 2013	402	0.71
Part 1: Twilight struggles to adjust to her new wings and duties as a princess while she prepares for the Summer Sun Celebration away from her friends. Shortly after consoling Twilight that night, Princess Celestia is attacked by a black vine. Twilight awakens the next morning to find that Celestia and Luna have disappeared, leaving the sun and moon hanging in the sky, now split between day and night. In addition, the castle guards inform her of an overgrowth of black vines from the Everfree Forest near Ponyville. Returning to Ponyville to gather the Elements of Harmony, Twilight and her friends suspect Discord is responsible and summon him for answers, but he claims to be innocent. The ponies consult Zecora who, having abandoned the forest, gives Twilight a potion she says will help her learn what is causing the havoc. After drinking the potion, Twilight finds herself in an unfamiliar castle with Princess Luna, who transforms into Nightmare Moon. Part 2: Twilight realizes that Luna's transformation is a vision of the past caused by Zecora's potion. Further flashbacks allow her to witness Celestia and Luna's discovery of the Elements of Harmony at the mystical Tree of Harmony in the Everfree Forest. Twilight and her friends enter the forest with the Elements, believing the tree to be in danger. Twilight is soon sent away by her friends as they grow concerned for her safety, but rejoins them after Discord mocks her for putting herself before her friends. Finding the tree entangled by the vines, Twilight deduces that it needs the Elements to survive and returns them to the tree, eradicating the vines and freeing Celestia and Luna. The tree then sprouts a flower containing a chest with six keyholes, mystifying the ponies. Back in Ponyville, Discord admits to sowing the vines shortly before his original defeat in a delayed plot to plunder the tree's magic and he claims to have deliberately withheld this so Twilight would learn how to be a proper leader. The Summer Sun Celebration then commences, with Twilight participating before her cheering friends.
68	3	"Castle Mane-ia"	Josh Haber	November 30, 2013	403	0.46
Twilight goes to Princess Celestia and Princess Luna's old castle to research the chest from the Tree of Harmony, finding a diary kept by the sisters that explains the workings of the castle. Meanwhile, Applejack and Rainbow Dash challenge each other to stay the night in the castle, which they believe is haunted by the Pony of Shadows, while Rarity takes Fluttershy along to the castle to look for old tapestries to repair. They all accidentally get into several hijinks of traps and devices triggered by themselves, as well as an unknown pony playing on the castle's organ, thought to be the Pony of Shadows. Twilight finds them all in a state of panic and calms them down, and together they find the organ player to be Pinkie Pie, who had followed her friends to the castle, thinking there would be a party.
69	4	"Daring Don't"	Dave Polsky	December 7, 2013	404	0.40
Upon learning that the next Daring Do book has been delayed, Rainbow Dash insists that she and her friends should help the author of the books, A.K. Yearling, to finish the book faster. Arriving at Yearling's cabin, the group witness the author fighting a group of thugs and discover her to be Daring Do herself. Rainbow Dash is eager to help Daring Do and follows her but Daring Do insists she works alone and turns her away. In her excitement, Rainbow Dash accidentally ruins Daring Do's plan to retrieve a mystical ring from the thugs resulting in her getting captured by her nemesis Ahuizotl, who takes the ring to a nearby temple in order to activate a doomsday device. Rainbow Dash and her friends then come to Daring Do's rescue and together they destroy the temple and thwart Ahuizotl's plans. As a result, Daring Do appreciates Rainbow Dash's help and writes her into her next book as thanks.
70	5	"Flight to the Finish"	Ed Valentine	December 14, 2013	405	0.57
The foals in Ponyville compete under Rainbow Dash's coaching to be the town's flag carrier for the upcoming Equestria Games. The Cutie Mark Crusaders put together an impressive routine that showcases how all three races of pony live harmoniously in Ponyville. Diamond Tiara and Silver Spoon, who are also participating, attempt to sabotage the event by pointing out Scootaloo's inability to fly at her age. Annoyed, Scootaloo changes the routine to focus more on her flying and spends all her time practicing, exhausting Apple Bloom and Sweetie Belle. Scootaloo eventually loses hope of ever flying and drops out. When Rainbow Dash finds out, she takes Apple Bloom and Sweetie Belle to Scootaloo's home and reinforces the idea that their presentation is not about her ability to fly, but the friendships between the three of them. Scootaloo rejoins her friends, and they win the competition.
71	6	"Power Ponies"	Meghan McCarthy, Charlotte Fullerton & Betsy McGowen	December 21, 2013	406	0.68
Spike finds himself unneeded while his friends clean up Princess Celestia and Princess Luna's old castle, so he goes off to read a Power Ponies superhero comic issue, unaware that it possesses magical powers. When he reaches the end and reads the cryptic text on the last page, he and his friends are sucked into the comic book. In the comic, the ponies get transformed and assume the personas of the Power Ponies, while Spike is transformed into their bumbling sidekick, Hum Drum, to his annoyance. The ponies learn that they must defeat the supervillain Mane-iac in order to escape the comic, but their clumsiness with their newfound powers leaves all but Spike trapped. As the Mane-iac threatens them with her doomsday weapon, the ponies assert that Spike always comes through for them when they need him. Spike is able to use the distraction to trap the Mane-iac's henchmen and free the others, allowing them to stop the Mane-iac and safely return home to Equestria.
72	7	"Bats!"	Merriwether Williams	December 28, 2013	407	0.53
Applejack discovers that vampire fruit bats have infested Sweet Apple Acres and rallies her friends to get rid of them before her orchard is destroyed. Fluttershy argues the long-term benefits posed by the bats' eating habits, but Applejack dismisses her. Fluttershy reluctantly helps her friends round up the bats and uses her Stare to keep them in place while Twilight applies a spell that eradicates their appetite for apples. The next morning, Applejack finds that her crops are still being eaten despite Twilight's spell still being in effect. During a stakeout, she and her friends identify the culprit as Fluttershy, who has turned into a bat/pony hybrid as an unintended side-effect of the spell. Fluttershy's friends lure her to a mirror using Applejack's prized apple intended for a county fair as bait, immobilizing her with her own Stare and allowing Twilight to reverse the spell. Applejack builds a sanctuary for the bats per Fluttershy's suggestion and apologizes for ignoring her.
73	8	"Rarity Takes Manehattan"	Dave Polsky	January 4, 2014	408	0.53
Rarity participates in a fashion competition in the city of Manehattan, bringing her friends for support. She loans samples of her fabric to fellow competitor Suri Polomare out of generosity, only to find the next day that Suri and her aide Coco Pommel have used the fabric to recreate her entire line. Fearing she will be accused of copying Suri, Rarity pressures her friends into missing all their planned activities in order to help make another fashion line. Rarity's new line wins at the show, but she notices her friends' absence and is overcome with remorse. She reconciles with her friends while Suri lies that Rarity lost the show so as to keep the trophy for herself. Rarity later receives her trophy from Coco, who says that Rarity's generosity has inspired her to quit working for Suri. Coco also gives her a spool of rainbow-colored thread and is offered a new job with one of Rarity's connections in return.
74	9	"Pinkie Apple Pie"	Natasha Levinger	January 11, 2014	409	0.50
Pinkie Pie finds a genealogy scroll that suggests she and the Apple family are related, but the text confirming it is smudged beyond legibility. Applejack suggests a trip to their relative Goldie Delicious to find out for sure and cautions the rest of her immediate family to be on their best behavior for Pinkie. Though the trip starts out uneventful, complications arise once their wagon breaks down and forces them to travel down a river, where bickering between the Apples further stymies their travels until they are eventually redirected over a waterfall. The Apples and Pinkie nevertheless make it safely to Goldie's cabin but find that the necessary text in her family record book is also scrubbed out. Despite Pinkie's disappointment, Applejack considers her to still be family for being able to put up with their fighting and, like her own immediate ones, work out their differences for the better.
75	10	"Rainbow Falls"	Corey Powell	January 18, 2014	410	0.51
Rainbow Dash leads the Ponyville team for a relay race to qualify for the Equestria Games. At the tryouts, she finds the Cloudsdale team is composed of the Wonderbolts Spitfire, Fleetfoot, and Soarin, and begins to doubt her less skilled teammates. After Soarin crashes and injures his wing, Spitfire and Fleetfoot goad Rainbow Dash into filling in for him. Rainbow Dash secretly splits practice between her friends and the Wonderbolts, but Twilight soon discovers her two-timing and urges her to choose a team. Rainbow Dash pretends to be injured to avoid making a decision but learns while in the hospital that even though Soarin has recovered, the Wonderbolts still want her as a replacement. Angered by their treatment of Soarin, Rainbow Dash reasserts her loyalty to Ponyville and rejoins her friends while also getting Soarin back on his old team. Rainbow Dash qualifies Ponyville for the games, and Spitfire respectfully gives her a Wonderbolt pin.
76	11	"Three's a Crowd"	Meghan McCarthy & Ed Valentine	January 25, 2014	411	0.48
Princess Cadance visits Ponyville to spend the day with Twilight, who anticipates quiet bonding time with her sister-in-law. To Twilight's dismay, however, she and Cadance are both approached by Discord, who appears to have come down sick with the "blue flu", to which he badgers them into taking care of him while Fluttershy is away. His list of increasingly outlandish demands gets on Twilight's nerves until he finally asks them to make a cure from a flower that grows at the edge of Equestria. Twilight and Cadance recover the flower and fight off a giant Tatzlwurm guarding it, only to find upon returning that Discord had faked his illness in order to test how far Twilight was willing to go for his well-being. Despite this, Cadance injects by pointing out that she actually enjoyed their adventure as a change of pace from her boring royal duties. The Tatzlwurm suddenly reappears and sneezes on Discord, causing him to actually feel sick and for Fluttershy to take care of him upon returning to Ponyville.
77	12	"Pinkie Pride"	Story by : Jayson Thiessen; Teleplay by : Amy Keating Rogers	February 1, 2014	412	0.46
A party planner named Cheese Sandwich arrives in Ponyville on the same day Pinkie Pie is planning a "birth-iversary" party celebrating Rainbow Dash's birthday and anniversary of her move to Ponyville. The townsfolk, including the girls, are entranced by Cheese's partying and allow him to plan the festivities instead, leaving Pinkie dejected. Refusing to be outdone, Pinkie challenges Cheese to a "goof-off" to determine who will headline the party. However, Pinkie soon notices the strain that her prideful behavior is putting on Rainbow Dash and forfeits the match. Her friends go and apologize for making her feel neglected, but she instead counters that it is her fault. Cheese arrives and reveals that it was Pinkie who inspired him to become a party planner as a colt. Pinkie and Cheese work together to throw Rainbow Dash a spectacular party before Cheese departs, leaving Pinkie his favorite rubber chicken as a parting gift.
78	13	"Simple Ways"	Josh Haber	February 8, 2014	413	0.55
Rarity is elected to host the Ponyville Days festival, which she hopes will attract the attention of Trenderhoof, a travel writer whom she has been smitten by. Upon his arrival, Rarity takes Trenderhoof on a tour of Ponyville, but she becomes aghast when he falls for Applejack and her farming ways. Rarity forgoes her festival duties to help out on the farm in the hopes of attracting Trenderhoof's attention but is unable to sway him. As a last-ditch effort, Rarity changes her festival's elegant theme to a farming one, dressing and speaking like a farmer herself. Annoyed by her antics, Applejack impersonates Rarity in retaliation, causing Rarity to realize her own foolish behavior, apologize, and return to her original theme in time for the festival.
79	14	"Filli Vanilli"	Amy Keating Rogers	February 15, 2014	414	0.58
After listening to Fluttershy's amazing singing, her friends suggest that she should perform with the Pony Tones vocal quartet at a benefit concert, but she refuses due to her stage fright. When Big Mac loses his voice the day before he is to sing bass at the concert, Fluttershy agrees to sing his part backstage while Big Mac lip-syncs, taking a Poison Joke brew made by Zecora to recreate her masculine "Flutterguy" voice. The concert goes on perfectly, and Fluttershy insists to continue singing for Big Mac out of sight as she enjoys being able to sing. After Big Mac recovers his voice, Fluttershy asks to perform one last time, but accidentally reveals herself during the concert. She runs off in embarrassment, but her friends convince her that facing her worst fear was not as bad as she had imagined because the audience loved her performance. Fluttershy agrees to perform privately for her friends with the Pony Tones and permanently join the band once she fully overcomes her stage fright.
80	15	"Twilight Time"	Dave Polsky	February 22, 2014	415	0.47
The Cutie Mark Crusaders are taking lessons under Twilight's mentorship in a weekly event called "Twilight Time". They decide to take Diamond Tiara and Silver Spoon as guests to their next lesson, wanting to one-up Diamond Tiara's showmanship at school, though they are more excited about meeting Twilight. Soon, all of the Crusaders' classmates befriend them, hoping to meet Twilight themselves. As the pressure mounts on the Crusaders, they are forced to bring them all to the next Twilight Time, where they realize that with all the attention they have received, they have forgotten to practice for their lessons. Twilight is disappointed to learn that the Crusaders have taken advantage of her popularity and adjourns Twilight Time. However, the Crusaders apologize for what they have done. Twilight forgives them and lets them continue their studies in secret from the other foals.
81	16	"It Ain't Easy Being Breezies"	Natasha Levinger	March 1, 2014	416	0.64
Fluttershy and her friends help a flock of sprite-like breezies migrate through Ponyville by creating a breeze they need to fly on to reach their distant home before the portal to it closes in a few days' time. When a group accidentally gets separated from the rest of the flock, Fluttershy takes them in for the short while they need to rest before setting out again. The other breezies enjoy being in her care, and Fluttershy, not wanting to disappoint them, lengthens their stay. An abrasive breezie named Seabreeze desperately takes off on his own and runs into trouble with a swarm of bees, but Fluttershy comes to his aid by talking sternly to the bees. Realizing the dangers Ponyville poses for the breezies, Fluttershy firmly convinces them to depart. Finding the group too small to ride the breeze, Twilight uses a spell to transform her and her friends into breezies, allowing the collective group to reach the breezies' home in time. Seabreeze gives Fluttershy a flower and their thanks as the portal closes.
82	17	"Somepony to Watch Over Me"	Scott Sonneborn	March 8, 2014	417	0.63
Apple Bloom's family agrees that she is old enough to stay alone at the farm while the three of them go on various errands, including pie deliveries, across Equestria. Shortly after leaving, Applejack has second thoughts and returns home, her sudden appearance startling Apple Bloom into making an accidental mess. Believing Apple Bloom caused the mess on her own, Applejack remains home to incessantly surveil her and childproof the entire farm. Annoyed with Applejack's pampering, Apple Bloom gets Sweetie Belle and Scootaloo to cover for her while she sneaks off and makes Applejack's pie deliveries for her to prove herself capable of being on her own. She encounters a hungry chimera in a swamp and does her best to protect herself and the pies until Applejack, upon discovering the ruse, arrives and rescues her. Surprised to see her sister managed to save the pies, Applejack stops babying Apple Bloom, and they finish the delivery together.
83	18	"Maud Pie"	Noelle Benvenuti	March 15, 2014	418	0.52
Pinkie Pie is eager for her friends to meet her older sister Maud, whom she says has much in common with each of them. When Maud arrives, however, the girls find her to be a dull pony with an unusual interest in rocks and, despite their best efforts, fail to find any common interest with her. Upset by her friends' inability to befriend Maud, Pinkie decides to help them by constructing an obstacle course that combines all of their interests, including a giant pile of rocks for Maud. While demonstrating the course, Pinkie is nearly crushed by a boulder, but Maud rescues her. The girls realize that Maud cares for Pinkie as much as they do, so they apologize to both sisters and offer their friendship to Maud over their shared bond, which she accepts.
84	19	"For Whom the Sweetie Belle Toils"	Dave Polsky	March 22, 2014	419	0.66
Sweetie Belle asks Rarity to help with her costumes for a stage play she put together herself. After the play, Sweetie Belle finds that Rarity's dresses garnered more praise than the play itself and accuses Rarity of upstaging her on purpose. The night before Rarity is to deliver outfits to Sapphire Shores in Canterlot, Sweetie Belle spitefully sabotages one of the pieces. Later that night, Sweetie Belle is visited in her dreams by Princess Luna, who uses visions of the past, present, and future to show Rarity's pure intentions to Sweetie Belle, and the horrific downward spiral she will undergo if Sweetie Belle's sabotage goes unchecked. Awakening to find Rarity has left for Canterlot, Sweetie Belle rushes after her with Apple Bloom and Scootaloo, and manages to repair the outfit with Luna's help before Rarity can present it. Sapphire is pleased with the dresses, and Sweetie Belle reconciles with Rarity.
85	20	"Leap of Faith"	Josh Haber	March 29, 2014	420	0.55
Flim and Flam return to Ponyville, selling a "miracle curative tonic" they claim can relieve anypony's ailments. After seeing one pony named Silver Shill get better on the spot after taking the drink, Granny Smith buys a bottle and finds herself able to pursue her old swimming hobbies from her youth. Applejack investigates the brothers' stage to discover that the tonic is a placebo, and that Silver Shill is an actor and accomplice of the brothers. Flim and Flam get her to keep it quiet in order to spare Granny's newfound happiness and use her reluctant approval to increase the tonic's popularity. After Granny and Apple Bloom compete in a swim meet, Applejack saves Granny from performing a dangerous high dive stunt. Realizing the harm her lies are causing, Applejack exposes the brothers' scheme and runs them out of town. Silver Shill is touched by Applejack's honesty and gives her the single coin he earned while working for the brothers and promises to change his ways.
86	21	"Testing Testing 1, 2, 3"	Amy Keating Rogers	April 5, 2014	421	0.58
Twilight worries that Rainbow Dash is unprepared for a test on the history of the Wonderbolts as part of her entrance exam to join the Wonderbolts Reserves. She tries to tutor Rainbow Dash using standard academic methods, but Rainbow Dash proves too bored and restless to pay any attention. Their friends offer to help Rainbow Dash study through other unique means, only for Rainbow Dash to become overwhelmed by their clashing methods and arguing on whose method is best. While flying with her to try to cheer her up, Twilight discovers that Rainbow Dash is able to subconsciously memorize anything going on around her while she is airborne. Under Twilight's direction, everypony in Ponyville re-enacts the Wonderbolts' history as Rainbow Dash obliviously flies over the town, allowing her to retain everything and ace the exam.
87	22	"Trade Ya!"	Scott Sonneborn	April 19, 2014	422	0.51
Twilight and her friends attend the Rainbow Falls Traders Exchange, splitting off into pairs. Fluttershy helps Rainbow Dash acquire a rare Daring Do book through a lengthy series of trades, culminating with an exchange with an orthros for the book, but requiring Fluttershy to help housetrain the creature for an extended period. Regretting her eagerness in the trade, Rainbow Dash nullifies the exchange and trades the orthros for a bird whistle, which she gives to Fluttershy. Meanwhile, Rarity and Applejack pool their goods to trade, but begin fighting over specific items they each want that would require trading away their entire stash. They eventually get each other more affordable items similar to what they want. Finally, Pinkie Pie tries to help Twilight trade off old books by making them out to be more valuable than they are, until Twilight decides to keep the books for their treasured memories. At the end of the day, the girls happily recount their tales on their way back home.
88	23	"Inspiration Manifestation"	Corey Powell & Meghan McCarthy	April 26, 2014	423	0.39
Rarity believes her creativity is lost when a puppet stage she designed is rejected by her customer. Spike, concerned for Rarity, finds an old book in Princess Celestia and Princess Luna's old castle containing a spell that allows her to create anything she imagines on a whim. Rarity is slowly taken over by the book's magic and begins making troublesome glamorizations around Ponyville to suit her creative visions. Spike reluctantly supports Rarity, fearing he will lose her favor if he tries to stop her. Eventually, however, he takes the book away from her in the hopes of keeping her from using the spell, but she remains possessed by the book's dark magic. Finally, Spike musters the courage to tell Rarity what he truly feels about her behavior, which returns her to normal.
89	24	"Equestria Games"	Dave Polsky	May 3, 2014	424	0.41
As Ponyville arrives at the Crystal Empire to compete in the Equestria Games, Spike is chosen to be the torch lighter in recognition of his role in saving the city. At the opening ceremony, Spike succumbs to performance anxiety and is unable to ignite his fire breath. To save him from embarrassment, Twilight discreetly uses her magic to light the torch for him. When Twilight tells him the truth, he tries to find other ways to help in the ceremonies, but his failures make him feel even more humiliated. During an ice archery event, one arrow goes off its mark and into a cloud, creating a giant mass of ice that threatens to crush a section of the stadium. Spike jumps in and melts the ice in time with his fire breath. Spike is hailed as a hero again and is allowed to perform the games' closing ceremony, restoring his self-confidence.
90	25	"Twilight's Kingdom" (Parts 1 & 2)	Meghan McCarthy	May 10, 2014	425	0.68
91	26	"Twilight's Kingdom" (Parts 1 & 2)	Meghan McCarthy	May 10, 2014	426	0.79
Part 1: After greeting some delegates in the Crystal Empire, Twilight laments her unfulfilling duties as a princess, but Celestia, Luna, and Cadance assure her that she will have a duty to serve. News arrives that Lord Tirek, a powerful centaur from Equestria's past, has escaped from Tartarus and is draining magic from ponies to grow stronger. Twilight is eager to help, but Celestia sends Discord to capture Tirek, due to his ability to sense a magical imbalance. Discord convinces Twilight and her friends to try opening the chest from the Tree of Harmony, which he believes contains a way to defeat Tirek. While reading their friendship journal, Twilight discovers that her friends have each been challenged over their respective Elements of Harmony and rewarded with a gift from someone they inspired. The gifts become five of the six keys needed to open the chest, but Twilight has yet to have a challenge herself. Meanwhile, Tirek convinces Discord to join forces with him and they plunder more of Equestria's magic. Part 2: As Tirek continues to drain ponies' magic, the princesses give Twilight their own magic in order to hide it from Tirek, who is unaware of Twilight's existence. Tirek captures the other princesses and, learning of Twilight, turns towards Ponyville. There, he drains the magic from Twilight's friends and betrays Discord by stealing his magic as well. Twilight faces off against Tirek in a destructive battle that ends in a draw. Tirek offers Twilight her friends' freedom in exchange for her magic, to which she agrees by ordering Discord's release as well. Remorsefully, Discord gives her a medallion he had received from Tirek in their alliance, which becomes the final key needed for the chest. Twilight and her friends open the chest, and it bestows them with a new power that allows them to reimprison Tirek, free the princesses and restore everypony's magic. The chest then transforms into a new castle for Twilight to reign alongside her friends as the Princess of Friendship.

== DVD release ==
My Little Pony: Friendship Is Magic: Season Four
Set details	Special features
26 episodes; 4-disc set; 16:9 aspect ratio; Subtitles: English	2014 San Diego Comic-Con panel; Sing-Alongs ("Bats", "Generosity", "Apples to the Core" and "Pinkie the Party Planner")
Release dates
Region 1
December 2, 2014
