= Flight to the Finish =

- My Little Pony: Friendship Is Magic episode
- The Cutie Mark Crusaders perform their routine for the competition.
- Episode no.: Season 4 Episode 5
- Written by: Ed Valentine
- Original air date: December 14, 2013
- Running time: 22 minutes

Episode chronology
← Previous "Daring Don't"	Next → "Power Ponies"
- My Little Pony: Friendship Is Magic season 4

"Flight to the Finish" is the fifth episode of the fourth season of the animated television series My Little Pony: Friendship Is Magic. The episode was written by Ed Valentine. It originally aired on The Hub on December 14, 2013. In this episode, the Cutie Mark Crusaders compete to be Ponyville's flag carrier for the Equestria Games.

== Plot ==
External videos
- Flight to the Finish (full episode) — Official upload of the episode onto YouTube

The Cutie Mark Crusaders learn about a competition at the Crystal Empire to carry the Ponyville flag at the Equestria Games, with Ms. Harshwhinny serving as judge and Rainbow Dash as their coach. The trio decides to create a routine showcasing the friendship between unicorns, pegasi, and earth ponies in Ponyville, with each filly representing her respective pony type. When the Crusaders show their routine to Rainbow Dash, she loves it but tries to contain her enthusiasm to maintain professionalism around Ms. Harshwhinny, giving only lukewarm feedback. Diamond Tiara and Silver Spoon witness the performance and realize the Crusaders could actually win, so they target Scootaloo's insecurity about representing pegasi despite being unable to fly. They convince Scootaloo that she needs to incorporate aerial stunts into the routine to truly represent the pegasi.

Scootaloo spends hours attempting to add flying to their performance but repeatedly fails to maintain flight for more than brief moments. Despite Rainbow Dash's advice to stick with their original plan, Scootaloo becomes increasingly frustrated with her limitations and eventually decides to quit the team entirely. She tells Apple Bloom and Sweetie Belle at the train station that her inability to fly will only hurt their chances of winning, so they board the train to the Crystal Empire without her.

Rainbow Dash discovers that Scootaloo has abandoned the team and immediately stops the train to retrieve Apple Bloom and Sweetie Belle. They return to Ponyville and find Scootaloo in her bedroom, having thrown her scooter in the garbage in despair. Rainbow Dash, Apple Bloom, and Sweetie Belle convince her that she does not need to fly to represent pegasus ponies, as her determination and spirit embody what makes pegasi special. Rainbow Dash reassures Scootaloo that she's "all kinds of awesome" whether she can fly or not.

Reinvigorated, Scootaloo retrieves her scooter and races to the Crystal Empire with her friends in tow, arriving just in time to perform their original routine before a packed stadium. Their performance wins the competition, which earns them the right to represent their hometown at the Equestria Games.

== Reception ==
Sherilyn Connelly, the author of Ponyville Confidential, gave the episode an "A" rating.

Daniel Alvarez of Unleash The Fanboy gave the episode a perfect rating of 5 out of 5 and called it "not only the best episode of Season 4 thus far, but also the best Cutie Mark Crusaders episode of them all." Alvarez praised new writer Ed Valentine for creating one of the best Rainbow Dash portrayals and noted that the episode was the first to address Scootaloo's inability to fly, calling the song "Hearts Strong as Horses" the new official theme song for the Cutie Mark Crusaders.

In a critical analysis of the episode, author Jen A. Blue noted that "Flight to the Finish" directly addressed fan speculation about Scootaloo's disability while depicting Diamond Tiara as a much more realistic bully than previous antagonists, describing her as socially adept and skilled at exploiting victims' weaknesses. Blue analyzed Rainbow Dash's character development throughout the series, arguing that her supportive coaching style represents a complete evolution from her earlier harsh competitiveness, and praised the episode for handling disability themes without explicitly using the term "disabled." Blue interpreted the episode through the lens of social construct of disability and wrote that Scootaloo "becomes disabled when Diamond Tiara teases her, and ceases to be disabled when Rainbow Dash talks her through it," arguing that disability is defined by the interaction between physical condition and social circumstances rather than physical limitations alone. Blue concluded that the episode shows Scootaloo taking a huge stride forward by rejecting arbitrary standards for what a pegasus "should be" and finding comfort with herself as she is.

Raymond Gallant of Freakin' Awesome Network gave the episode a rating of 8 out of 10 and praised how Ed Valentine "managed to make it work perfectly without it feeling offensive, or overly sympathetic" regarding Scootaloo's disability themes. He described it as "one of the best written Rainbow Dash appearances ever" and highlighted her character evolution, though he criticized some pacing issues and felt the song served as filler rather than advancing the plot. Sofie Liv of The Agony Booth gave the episode a rating of 3.5 out of 5 and called it "an above average episode for this show", commenting that it became an instant fan favorite for finally addressing Scootaloo's inability to fly. Nevertheless, Liv criticized the episode's clumsy structure but praised how it handled the tough subject with dignity and maturity and commended Rainbow Dash's heartfelt speech.

== See also ==
- List of My Little Pony: Friendship Is Magic episodes
