= It Ain't Easy Being Breezies =

- My Little Pony: Friendship Is Magic episode
- Fluttershy (left) takes care of the Breezies (right) in her cottage.
- Episode no.: Season 4 Episode 16
- Written by: Natasha Levinger
- Original air date: March 1, 2014
- Running time: 22 minutes

Guest appearances
- Ashleigh Ball as Twirly; Andrea Libman as Windfall; Tabitha St. Germain as Cup Cake; Cathy Weseluck as Breezette and Flicker; Brian Drummond as Seabreeze and Carrot Cake

Episode chronology
← Previous "Twilight Time"	Next → "Somepony to Watch Over Me"
- My Little Pony: Friendship Is Magic season 4

"It Ain't Easy Being Breezies" is the sixteenth episode of the fourth season of the animated television series My Little Pony: Friendship Is Magic. The episode was written by Natasha Levinger. It originally aired on The Hub on March 1, 2014. In this episode, Fluttershy helps a group of sprite-like breezies migrate home, but her kindness leads her to keep them longer than she should.

== Plot ==
External videos
- It Ain't Easy Being Breezies (full episode) — Official upload of the episode onto YouTube

Fluttershy and her friends help a flock of sprite-like breezies migrate through Ponyville by creating a breeze they need to fly on to reach their distant home before the portal to it closes in a few days' time. After Spike climbs a tree to get a better view, a leaf flies off it, causing a group to accidentally get separated from the rest of the flock. Fluttershy, who can understand their language, takes them in for the short while they need to rest before setting out again. While Seabreeze, the abrasive leader, urges them to depart before the portal closes, the other breezies enjoy being in her care; Fluttershy, not wanting to disappoint them, lengthens their stay as they make up various reasons to do so.

Frustrated, Seabreeze desperately takes off on his own and runs into trouble with a swarm of bees, but Fluttershy comes to his aid by talking sternly to the bees after her attempts to treat them nicely fail. Fluttershy realizes the dangers Ponyville poses for the breezies and how her kindness nearly cost them their chance to return home. When Seabreeze complains that the other breezies do not listen to him, Fluttershy points out his tendency to shout and insult others. She and Seabreeze rush to get the breezies home, the former firmly convincing them to depart. Finding the group too small to ride the breeze, Twilight uses a spell to transform her and her friends into breezies, allowing the collective group to reach the breezies' home in time. Seabreeze gives Fluttershy a flower and their thanks as the portal closes.

== Background ==
"It Ain't Easy Being Breezies" was written by Natasha Levinger and co-directed by Jim Miller with Jayson Thiessen as supervising director. Brian Drummond guest stars as Seabreeze. According to him, several of the lines were scripted but they were "used as a good base for mostly a bunch of silly ad libbing". The Breezies are based on fairies that appear in classic fairy tales. Hillary Busis from Entertainment Weekly described them as "look[ing] sort of like a cross between mini-ponies and butterflies". Their clear wings, miniature size, and rounded bodies are intended to convey their delicacy and fragility that can cause them to be blown away by a single gust of wind.

== Broadcast and reception ==
=== Broadcast ===
The episode aired on March 1, 2014, on The Hub. According to Nielson household ratings, the episode was viewed by approximately 644,000 people and 0.3 percent of households.

=== Critical reception ===
Sherilyn Connelly, the author of Ponyville Confidential, gave the episode a "B-" rating.

In a critical analysis of the episode, author Jen A. Blue connected Fluttershy to the Jewish concept of chesed (loving-kindness) and noted that this episode deviates from the usual "key episode" formula (from "Twilight's Kingdom"), as "rather than failing to be kind, Fluttershy is being inappropriately kind." Blue wrote that the episode avoids both Randian and anti-immigrant readings through the character of Seabreeze, whose positive qualities derive from homesickness and fear rather than being an Übermensch, and through the Mane Six becoming Breezies themselves to help with the journey home. Blue analyzed the Breezies as qlippothic shadows from Hermetic understanding, which represents corrupted charity that seeks to consume rather than participate, and wrote that Fluttershy learns to limit her loving-kindness while Seabreeze learns the value of gentleness. Blue concluded that the episode demonstrates the necessity of protective "shells" around the sefirot and wrote that "to truly ascend the Tree of Life, one must accept the Tree of Death" and that harmony cannot exist without accepting discord.

Daniel Alvarez of Unleash The Fanboy gave the episode a rating of 9 out of 10 and called it "a good episode". He praised Fluttershy's characterization and Natasha Levinger's writing, highlighting the bee scene as a standout moment. Alvarez described Seabreeze as one of the better new characters and called the climax where the Mane Six transform into breezies "awesome, and different." Sofie Liv of The Agony Booth gave the episode a rating of 2 out of 5 and called it "a bit dull," criticizing the Breezies as extremely weak creatures that seemed designed just to be cute and sell toys. She praised Seabreeze as a funny character but found the episode unremarkable overall, noting it was enjoyable enough but didn't stand out. Brendan Kachel of flayrah called Seabreeze his "favorite new character of this season" and described him as a disgustingly cute critter who talks in a hilarious accent but does not realize how adorable he is when angry. Kachel wrote that the character reminded him of himself. Ed Liu of Anime Superhero News called the moral "more muddled than it should be" and called the episode "too predictable in a bad way".

== See also ==
- List of My Little Pony: Friendship Is Magic episodes
