= Power Ponies =

- My Little Pony: Friendship Is Magic episode
- Spike and the Mane Six, in the comic book world, declare the Power Ponies victorious.
- Episode no.: Season 4 Episode 6
- Directed by: Jayson Thiessen (supervising); Jim Miller (co-director)
- Written by: Meghan McCarthy; Charlotte Fullerton; Betsy McGowen
- Editing by: Meghan McCarthy (story)
- Original air date: December 21, 2013
- Running time: 22 minutes

Guest appearance
- Ellen Kennedy as Mane-iac

Episode chronology
← Previous "Flight to the Finish"	Next → "Bats!"
- My Little Pony: Friendship Is Magic (season 4)

"Power Ponies" is the sixth episode of the fourth season as well as the 71st episode overall. In the episode, Spike, Twilight Sparkle, Rainbow Dash, Fluttershy, Applejack, Rarity, and Pinkie Pie are transported into a comic book where they become its characters. To escape, they must defeat the Mane-iac, the villain of the book. The episode was heavily influenced by comic books, including having a more modern and futuristic style. Upon its airing on December 21, 2013, on the Hub Network, it was viewed by over 600,000 people.

== Plot ==
External videos
- Power Ponies (full episode) — Official upload of the episode onto YouTube

Spike finds himself unneeded while his friends clean up Princess Celestia and Princess Luna's old castle, so he goes off to read a Power Ponies superhero comic issue, unaware that it possesses magical powers. When he reaches the end, he finds the book's ending to be missing. After reading the cryptic text on the last page, he and his friends are sucked into the comic book. In the comic, the ponies get transformed and assume the personas of the Power Ponies: Twilight Sparkle is transformed into Masked Matter-Horn, who can shoot power beams; Pinkie Pie into Fili-Second, who has super speed; Rainbow Dash into Zapp, who can control nature; Rarity into Radiance, who can create objects with her bracelets; Applejack into Mistress Mare-velous, who is psychically connected to her lasso; and Fluttershy into Saddle Rager, who turns into a monster when she loses her temper, while Spike is transformed into their bumbling sidekick, Hum Drum, to his annoyance.

The ponies learn that they must defeat the supervillain Mane-iac to escape the comic, but their clumsiness with their newfound powers causes the Mane-iac to spray them with her "Hairspray Ray of Doom", which freezes them and disables their powers. All but Spike are trapped. As the Mane-iac threatens them with her doomsday weapon, which will cause every pony's hair to grow wild, Spike hides, feeling useless. However, after the Mane-iac insults Hum Drum, the ponies assert that Spike always comes through for them when they need him. Spike is able to use the distraction to trap the Mane-iac's henchmen and free the others, allowing them to stop the Mane-iac. Fluttershy, reluctant to join the battle, turns to leave, but the Mane-iac spots her and tries to shoot her with a cannon. A firefly blocks the Mane-iac's sight, and she hits it. This angers Fluttershy, causing her to turn into a rage monster and defeat the Mane-iac. The ponies safely return home to Equestria and assure Spike that while they may not always need him, he is not useless. The comic later disappears.

== Production ==
The episode's style was influenced by comic books, making the cityscapes more distinct. Its perspective was harder than usual, with "strong parallaxes that show the dynamic viewpoint of comics." Unlike the series' normal setting, the episode featured a more modern and futuristic setting. The Power Ponies were also based on comic superheroes. The Mane-iac is a parody of the Joker.

Two exclusive Mane-iac toys were offered at the 2014 San Diego Comic-Con, a pony version and an Equestria Girls version.

== Broadcast and reception ==
=== Ratings ===
"Power Ponies" aired on the Hub Network on December 21, 2013. It was viewed by an estimated 683,000 people and approximately 0.3 percent of households, according to Nielsen ratings.

=== Critical reception ===
Daniel Alvarez of Unleash the Fanboy gave the episode 3.5 out 5 stars. While not considering it a "great" episode, Alvarez called it a "fun episode", particularly because of Pinkie Pie's use of her superpowers, Fluttershy's "hulk[...]-out", and the Mane-iac. However, he cited the episode's spotlight on Spike and the absence of a grand battle as detractors. Sofie Liv of The Agony Booth gave the episode a rating of 4 out of 5 and said it "nearly killed" her from laughter, particularly praising the Hulk-Fluttershy transformation as one of the funniest moments in the series. She called the episode "fun" and "above average" despite criticizing the weak Spike plot, and expressed love for the villain Mane-iac. In an article arguing that Friendship Is Magic is a work of high fantasy, Megan Crouse of Den of Geek described "Power Ponies" as "a standalone built entirely around the idea of placing the characters in a superhero world" and wrote that while it "can come off as a bit pandering and shallow to fans who have seen this kind of thing in crossover fan art before," the magical comic book's existence reveals more about Equestria's world-building.

The episode won the 2014 Leo Award for "Best Overall Sound in an Animation Program or Series" for Marcel Duperreault, Todd Araki, Jason Fredrickson, and Adam McGhie.
