= Three's a Crowd (My Little Pony: Friendship Is Magic) =

- My Little Pony: Friendship Is Magic episode
- Episode no.: Season 4 Episode 11
- Directed by: Jayson Thiessen (supervising); Jim Miller (co-director)
- Written by: Meghan McCarthy; Ed Valentine
- Original air date: January 25, 2014
- Running time: 22 minutes

Guest appearance
- John de Lancie as Discord

Episode chronology
| ← Previous "Rainbow Falls" | Next → "Pinkie Pride" |
- My Little Pony: Friendship Is Magic (season 4)

"Three's a Crowd" is the eleventh episode of the fourth season of animated television series My Little Pony: Friendship Is Magic as well as the seventy-sixth overall. With Britt McKillip and John de Lancie guest starring as Princess Cadance and Discord, the episode follows Twilight Sparkle and the former, who visits from the Crystal Empire, trying to have a relaxing day. When they are interrupted by a sick Discord, they must venture to the edge of Equestria to prevent him from disrupting their visit. Co-directed by Jim Miller, with Jayson Thiessen as executive producer, and written by Meghan McCarthy, the episode aired on January 25, 2014, receiving over 400,000 viewers during its original broadcast. The episode received mixed to positive reviews from critics, who praised Discord.

== Plot ==
External videos
- Three's a Crowd (full episode) — Official upload of the episode onto YouTube

Princess Cadance visits Ponyville to spend the day with Twilight, who anticipates quiet bonding time with her sister-in-law, while Fluttershy departs to see the Breezies. Twilight's friends promise to not let anything disrupt her and Cadance's time together as the last times they saw each other, the fate of Equestria hung in the balance. To their dismay, Discord shows up who appears to have come down sick with the "blue flu". Rainbow Dash escapes from the situation while Pinkie Pie is distracted by a balloon; Discord sneezes on Rarity and Applejack, making them sick too. After Twilight's friends become unavailable, Discord approaches Twilight and Cadance, the latter of whom creates a "magic health bubble" to prevent them from getting sick too. While Discord badgers them to take care of him while Fluttershy is away, his list of increasingly outlandish demands get on Twilight's nerves until he finally asks them to make a cure from a flower that grows at the edge of Equestria.

Twilight and Cadance recover the flower and fight off a giant Tatzlwurm guarding it, only to find upon returning that Discord had faked his illness to test how far Twilight was willing to go for his well-being. Despite Twilight's anger at him for ruining her day with her sister-in-law, Cadance injects by pointing out that she actually enjoyed their adventure as a change of pace from her predictable life in the Crystal Empire. The Tatzlwurm suddenly reappears, and sneezes on Discord, Twilight and Cadance. While the latters are protected by the health bubble, the former actually falls sick and he is returned to Ponyville for Fluttershy's care. Twilight documents what she learned in the friendship journal: that the most chaotic days can be great experiences when with a good friend.

== Background and production ==
The episode includes a reference to Fear and Loathing writer Hunter S. Thompson. Discord also sings his first solo. Originally, the Tatzlwurm had more resemblance to a sea creature. Later, it was developed into a creature similar to a worm. Rebecca Dart of DHX Media stated: "[h]ow scary a creature is can be changed by color. [...] [W]hen coloured lighter or more vibrantly, [it] can be less frightening." On Discord's appearances, co-director Jim Miller said "he [...] became a kind of character where you could just throw him in a different costume and have him do something extra silly—it seems to work really well for him."

== Broadcast and reception ==
Prior to the premiere of "Three's A Crowd", Yahoo! recommended the episode to fans of My Little Pony: Friendship Is Magic. It aired on January 25, 2014 and was viewed by 483,000 people. The episode received mixed to positive reviews from critics. Daniel Alvarez of Unleash the Fanboy gave the episode four out five stars, praising the characters, monster fight and the moral. Agony Booth's Sofie Liv was more ambivalent towards the episode and rated it two and a half out of five. She complemented Discord's entertainment and humor but felt his appearances in the series "will never be as good as his first appearance".
