= Dave Polsky =

American screenwriter

David Polsky is an American film and television screenwriter who created The Buzz on Maggie and co-wrote Scary Movie 2. He has also written episodes for My Little Pony: Friendship Is Magic and Hanazuki: Full of Treasures, among other animated television series.

== Filmography ==
=== Television ===
- Singled Out, writer, 130 episodes
- South Park, writer, 2 episodes
- The Cramp Twins, writer, 2 episodes
- Cedric the Entertainer Presents, writer, 17 episodes
- The Buzz on Maggie, creator & executive producer
- Class of 3000, writer, 7 episodes
- FrankTV, writer, 28 episodes
- Pair of Kings, writer, 2 episodes
- Sonic Boom, writer, 2 episodes
- My Little Pony: Friendship Is Magic, writer, 13 episodes
- My Little Pony: Equestria Girls Special, writer
- Dawn of the Croods, writer, 2 episodes
- Littlest Pet Shop: A World of Our Own, writer, 1 episode
- Hanazuki: Full of Treasures, developer, executive producer & writer, 8 episodes
- Nella the Princess Knight, writer, 1 episode
- Interrupting Chicken, writer, 2 episodes

=== Film ===
- Scary Movie 2, writer
