= Magic Duel =

- My Little Pony: Friendship Is Magic episode
- Episode no.: Season 3 Episode 5
- Directed by: James Wootton
- Written by: M.A. Larson
- Original air date: December 1, 2012
- Running time: 22 minutes

Guest appearance
- Brenda Crichlow as Zecora

Episode chronology
← Previous "One Bad Apple"	Next → "Sleepless in Ponyville"
- My Little Pony: Friendship Is Magic (season 3)

"Magic Duel" is the fifth episode of the third season of animated television series My Little Pony: Friendship Is Magic as well as the fifty-seventh overall. It premiered on December 1, 2012. The episode follows Twilight Sparkle, who is banished from Ponyville after Trixie, a former fraud, overpowers her with a magical amulet. Twilight must find a way to return to Ponyville and get Trixie to remove the amulet, which is corrupting her, from her neck.

== Plot ==
External videos
- Magic Duel (full episode) — Official upload of the episode onto YouTube

A mysterious pony buys the Alicorn Amulet, one of the most powerful artifacts. In the meantime, Twilight practices her magic at Fluttershy's cottage for Princess Celestia's visit with delegates from Saddle Arabia. She is interrupted by Rainbow Dash, who tells her that there is an emergency. Twilight rushes to the town, where the buyer of the amulet is revealed: Trixie. Trixie returns to Ponyville seek revenge from Twilight after her last visit. The powerful amulet is stronger than Twilight, and Trixie banishes her from Ponyville and seals the town with a glass dome. Stuck outside of Ponyville, Twilight goes to the Everfree Forest to see Zecora. Zecora offers to help her beat Trixie.

While Trixie takes over Ponyville, forcing everypony to be her slave, Twilight’s friends discover that the amulet also corrupts its user and only the user can remove it, and they send Fluttershy to tell Twilight. After hearing this, Twilight asks for a re-match. She secretly arranges with Zecora and her friends to perform simple illusions disguised as more powerful magic with a fake charm, making Trixie take off the amulet willingly to try the charm. This breaks the spell, and the amulet is secured by Zecora in a locked box. Now back to normal, Trixie realizes her mistake and apologises for her behavior after watching Twilight's magic show for Saddle Arabian delegades.

== Background ==
In October 2012, head writer Meghan McCarthy stated a fan favourite villain would return "in a very, very awesome way", who was later revealed to be Trixie, the antagonist of "Boast Busters". Due to this, the episode was one of the most anticipated season three episodes since the premiere, "The Crystal Empire".

== Reception ==
Daniel Alvarez of Unleash the Fanboy gave the episode five out five stars, calling it a "great episode all around" and "one of the best [Friendship Is Magic episodes] yet". He praised the characters, particularly Trixie and Zecora, and Twilight's usage of the "magic of friendship", which he said would be considered "cheesy" in any other television series. Writing for Freakin' Awesome Network, Raymond Gallant gave it nine and a half stars out of ten, and found it more energetic, amusing, and exciting than "The Crystal Empire". Whereas he commended her development, he deemed Trixie's reformation out of place. Other things he lauded included Zecora, the expansion of the series' world, and references to previous episodes and fandom.

In her analysis of the episode in a collection of critical analysis essays on Friendship Is Magic, author Jen A. Blue examined the episode's relationship to Joseph Campbell's monomyth and traditional narrative structures. She observed that the episode initially follows elements of the hero's journey framework found in works such as Star Wars, but ultimately focuses on Trixie's character development rather than Twilight's journey. Blue commented that Trixie defeats Twilight through stage magic rather than spell-casting, and described the episode as "a leading contender for strongest episode of the third season."
