= Best Night Ever (disambiguation) =

Best Night Ever may refer to:

- Best Night Ever, a 2013 American found footage comedy film written and directed by Jason Friedberg and Aaron Seltzer
- "Best Night Ever" (song), song by American country band Gloriana
- "The Best Night Ever", an episode of My Little Pony: Friendship Is Magic
