= Spike at Your Service =

- My Little Pony: Friendship Is Magic episode
- Episode no.: Season 3 Episode 9
- Directed by: James Wootton; Jayson Thiessen (supervising)
- Story by: Dave Polsky
- Teleplay by: Merriwether Williams
- Original air date: December 29, 2012
- Running time: 22 minutes

Episode chronology
← Previous "Apple Family Reunion"	Next → "Keep Calm and Flutter On"
- My Little Pony: Friendship Is Magic (season 3)

"Spike at Your Service" is the ninth episode of the third season of animated television series My Little Pony: Friendship Is Magic as well as the sixty-first overall. It aired on December 29, 2012. In this episode, Applejack saves Spike from a herd of timberwolves, and he insists on repaying her so that he can live up to the Noble Dragon Code. However, when he offers to help her with the chores on the farm, she is not comfortable with his attitude.

== Plot ==
External videos
- Spike at Your Service (full episode) — Official upload of the episode onto YouTube

When Applejack saves Spike from a timberwolf attack in the Everfree Forest, he insists on helping her around the farm in order to repay a life debt that is customary to dragons in their "Dragon Code". His efforts only make trouble for her and the other ponies, and they set up a fake timberwolf attack for Spike so that he can save Applejack from, thus making him feel satisfied with his debt. Their ruse draws a pack of real timberwolves, which Applejack easily crushes, but the pieces form into a single giant beast and she gets caught in a rockslide. Spike causes the timberwolf to fall apart by throwing a rock down its throat, and frees Applejack. Afterwards, Applejack convinces Spike to give up his debt.

== Background ==
"Spike at Your Service" was directed by James Wootton, with Jayson Thiessen supervising, and written by Merriwether Williams, based on a story by Dave Polsky. According to Polsky, though Spike is shown to know very little about being a dragon in "Dragon Quest", the Dragon Code "[k]inda felt ... credible he'd taken initiative to learn about his dragon heritage since". In the first treatment, Spike owed Rarity a life debt. Because Rarity was so cruel to Spike, it was changed to Applejack. The Timberwolves are dogs made of wood. According to Mary Jane Begin, author of My Little Pony: The Art of Equestria, their threateningness mostly comes from their size, machine-like structure, and sharp geometric shapes. They were modelled and animated by layout supervisor John Cantlie; instead of the planned Flash animation, the wolves were animated using Autodesk Maya.

== Broadcast and reception ==
The episode aired on December 29, 2012, on The Hub. It was viewed by 432,000 people and garnered double-digit year-to-year delivery gains in all demographics except kids aged 2–11 and 6–11, which gained one-digit gains. Daniel Alvarez of Unleash the Fanboy gave "Spike at Your Service" three and a half out of five stars, calling it "[n]ot great and perhaps the weakest episode of the season, but enjoyable nonetheless".

== Home media ==
The episode has been released as part of the Friendship Is Magic season three collections, in Region 1 by Shout! Factory and Region 4 by Madman Entertainment.
