= My Little Pony: Friendship Is Magic season 3 =

My Little Pony: Friendship Is Magic
- Season 3
- DVD cover
- No. of episodes: 13

Release
- Original network: The Hub
- Original release: November 10, 2012 – February 16, 2013

Season chronology
- ← Previous; Season 2 Next → Season 4

The third season of the animated television series My Little Pony: Friendship Is Magic, developed by Lauren Faust, originally aired on The Hub in the United States. The series is based on Hasbro's My Little Pony line of toys and animated works and is often referred by collectors to be the fourth generation, or "G4", of the My Little Pony franchise. Season 3 of the series premiered on November 10, 2012 on The Hub, an American pay television channel partly owned by Hasbro, and concluded on February 16, 2013.

The show follows a studious unicorn pony named Twilight Sparkle as her mentor Princess Celestia guides her to learn about friendship in the town of Ponyville. Twilight becomes close friends with five other ponies: Applejack, Rarity, Fluttershy, Rainbow Dash, and Pinkie Pie. Each represents a different face of friendship, and Twilight discovers herself to be a key part of the magical artifacts, the Elements of Harmony. The ponies share adventures and help out other residents of Ponyville, while working out the troublesome moments in their own friendships.

== Development ==
=== Concept ===
Season 3 features a broad arc which shows that Twilight has demonstrated positive leadership qualities beyond Celestia's expectations, leading Twilight to be crowned as a new Princess in Equestria and to become an "alicorn" (a pony with both a horn and a pair of wings).

=== Production ===
Season 3 is the first season of the show without input from Lauren Faust, the original creative director of the show who stepped down after the first season and provided creative consulting in the second; instead, production was overseen by Jayson Thiessen, while Meghan McCarthy was the lead writer for the series, who both shared the role of executive producer from Season 4 onwards.

A sneak peek of two future songs in Season 3, "The Failure Song" and "The Ballad of the Crystal Empire" (both from the first episode), was unveiled at the 2012 San Diego Comic-Con. Part of a continuing plot in this season is a journey that Twilight Sparkle undertakes that ultimately leads to her to be named a Princess in the season finale, which includes becoming an alicorn. Meghan McCarthy said that the intent was to show that they were building a "unique mythology around being a princess", and to show girls that while they cannot be princesses themselves, they can live to the ideals of one by "shar[ing] the gifts that they have been given with others".

As of Season 3, the song titles make their appearance in the closing credits, along with the names of the composer (Daniel Ingram) and lyricist. In addition, only the voice actors who take part in a particular episode are listed in the credits, along with all of their main/secondary roles. During the first two seasons, every episode credited only the same core group of actors and their main roles, whether they had speaking lines or not.

== Cast ==
=== Main ===
- Tara Strong as Twilight Sparkle (speaking voice)
  - Rebecca Shoichet as Twilight Sparkle (singing voice)
- Tabitha St. Germain as Rarity
  - Kazumi Evans as Rarity (singing voice)
- Ashleigh Ball as Applejack and Rainbow Dash
- Andrea Libman as Fluttershy and Pinkie Pie (speaking voice)
  - Shannon Chan-Kent as Pinkie Pie (singing voice); Libman occasionally
- Cathy Weseluck as Spike

=== Recurring ===
- Nicole Oliver as Princess Celestia
- Tabitha St. Germain as Princess Luna
- Britt McKillip as Princess Cadance
- Andrew Francis as Shining Armor
- The Cutie Mark Crusaders
  - Michelle Creber as Apple Bloom
  - Madeleine Peters as Scootaloo
  - Claire Corlett as Sweetie Belle (speaking voice)
    - Michelle Creber as Sweetie Belle (singing voice)

=== Minor ===
- Chantal Strand as Diamond Tiara
- Shannon Chan-Kent as Silver Spoon
- Kelly Metzger as Spitfire
- Kathleen Barr as Trixie Lulamoon
- Lee Tockar as Snips
- Richard Ian Cox as Snails
- Brenda Crichlow as Zecora
- Tabitha St. Germain as Granny Smith and Aunt Applesauce
- Peter New as Big McIntosh and Half Baked Apple
- Ashleigh Ball as Apple Rose and Apple Dumpling
- Andrea Libman as Apple Leaves
- Terry Klassen as Apple Split
- John de Lancie as Discord

=== Guest stars ===
- Jim Miller as King Sombra
- Brynna Drummond as Babs Seed
- Britt Irvin as Lightning Dust
- Veena Sood as Ms. Harshwhinny
- Patricia Drake as Ms. Peachbottom

== Episodes ==
Like the previous season, James Wootton directed each episode.

No. overall	No. in season	Title	Written by	Original release date	Prod. code	US viewers (millions)
53	1	"The Crystal Empire" (Parts 1 & 2)	Meghan McCarthy	November 10, 2012	301	0.58
54	2	"The Crystal Empire" (Parts 1 & 2)	Meghan McCarthy	November 10, 2012	302	0.58
Princess Celestia learns of the return of the Crystal Empire, which had disappeared over a thousand years ago by its former tyrannical unicorn ruler, King Sombra, before he was banished. Celestia fears Sombra will return and use the city's power to take over Equestria. She summons Twilight and instructs her to join her friends, Shining Armor, and Princess Cadance at the city to help protect it as a test of her abilities. At the city, Cadance attempts to maintain a spell to prevent the shadowy form of Sombra from entering. Twilight and her friends talk with the city's residents, the Crystal Ponies, and learn of a Crystal Fair which used to enlighten the hearts of the city and protect it from Sombra, with a Crystal Heart as the centerpiece, but they soon discover that the Crystal Heart is a necessary artifact to protect the city. With Cadance's magic weakening, Twilight instructs her friends to continue the fair to raise the spirits of the Crystal Ponies while she goes to look for the Crystal Heart by herself, assured this is the test Princess Celestia alluded to. However, she allows Spike to come along. They pass several traps Sombra had placed in the castle and eventually come to the Crystal Heart, just as Cadance's magic gives out and Sombra races to reclaim the city. Twilight moves on to recover the heart, but walks into a trap, telling Spike to take the heart in her place. On his way down, Spike falls, but he and the heart are saved at the last moment by Shining Armor and Cadance. The Crystal Ponies pour their emotions into the heart, recreating the protective spell on the city and obliterating Sombra. Twilight returns to Canterlot, convinced she has failed her test, but Celestia tells her that she has passed, knowing when to give up her personal goals for the greater good.
55	3	"Too Many Pinkie Pies"	Dave Polsky	November 17, 2012	303	0.43
Pinkie Pie is torn between spending fun time with all her friends, leading her to locate the Mirror Pool, which allows her to make a clone of herself. When she finds herself further conflicted over which friends to spend time with, she and her clone return to the pool and reiterate the process, but the clones begin to clone themselves further. The mass number of Pinkies, intent on only having fun, overwhelm Ponyville, and Pinkie becomes depressed that her friends cannot figure out who the real Pinkie is. Twilight puts the clones to a test of watching paint dry, zapping away those that lose attention, and assuring that the last remaining Pinkie is the real one.
56	4	"One Bad Apple"	Cindy Morrow	November 24, 2012	304	0.49
Apple Bloom's cousin Babs Seed from Manehatten comes to visits Ponyville. When Apple Bloom, Sweetie Belle, and Scootaloo try to welcome her into the Cutie Mark Crusaders, Babs instead joins Diamond Tiara and Silver Spoon in teasing and hounding them. The Crusaders try to get back at her by booby-trapping a parade float that they trick Babs into driving, but learn from Applejack after the deed that the reason Babs is visiting is that she was bullied by others back in Manehattan. The Crusaders save Babs, and together apologize for their actions. Babs joins the Crusaders and defends her new friends from Diamond Tiara and Silver Spoon at the train station before returning home.
57	5	"Magic Duel"	M.A. Larson	December 1, 2012	305	0.37
While Twilight practices her magic for Princess Celestia’s visit with delegates from Saddle Arabia, Trixie returns to exact revenge on her after her last visit to Ponyville and acquires the Alicorn Amulet, a magical artifact that gives her great power. She defeats Twilight in a magical duel and banishes her from Ponyville. Twilight goes to see Zecora, who offers to help her beat Trixie. While Trixie takes over Ponyville, Twilight’s friends discover that the amulet also corrupts its user and only the user can remove it, and they send Fluttershy to tell Twilight. Challenging Trixie to a rematch, Twilight secretly arranges with Zecora and her friends to perform simple illusions disguised as more powerful magic with a fake charm, making Trixie take off the amulet willingly to try the charm, breaking its spell on her. Once the amulet is secured, Trixie apologizes for her behavior.
58	6	"Sleepless in Ponyville"	Corey Powell	December 8, 2012	306	0.39
Scootaloo joins Apple Bloom and Sweetie Belle and their sisters on a camping trip, hoping to show off her skills to her idol, Rainbow Dash. After a night of telling scary tales by a campfire, Scootaloo has nightmares, but refuses to let anypony else know, worried this will ruin her image with Rainbow Dash. During another nightmare, she encounters Princess Luna, who tells her that her fears are not that of the scary stories but of disappointing Rainbow Dash, and she should face that fear. After Rainbow Dash saves her from falling over a waterfall, Scootaloo admits her fears to her. To her surprise, Rainbow Dash admits that she used to be scared of the same stories as a young filly and agrees to become Scootaloo's older sister figure.
59	7	"Wonderbolts Academy"	Merriwether Williams	December 15, 2012	307	0.51
Rainbow Dash is accepted into the Wonderbolt Academy, led by Spitfire, and quickly becomes friends with Lightning Dust, another pegasus who is as fast and skilled as her, but is more reckless. Rainbow Dash is surprised to find she is assigned as "wingpony" to Lightning Dust and becomes concerned when her aggressive approach endangers the other cadets. When Lightning Dust decides to create a tornado during a cloud-clearing exercise, the tornado threatens to harm Rainbow Dash's friends, who have come by to give her a care package. Once she saves her friends, Rainbow Dash decides to quit the academy, disgusted by the Wonderbolts' apparent approval of Lightning Dust's recklessness. However, Spitfire agrees with Rainbow Dash and persuades her to stay by stripping Lightning Dust of her rank and promoting Rainbow Dash to cadet team leader.
60	8	"Apple Family Reunion"	Cindy Morrow	December 22, 2012	309	0.37
The Apple family reunion is approaching, and Applejack offers to take over the event's organization from Granny Smith after going through photos of past reunions. Though Applejack's planned activities are in the spirit of the reunion, the events are long and rigorous, leaving all the guests exhausted. When a wild hayride destroys the barn, Applejack realizes that she has focused too hard on the event planning and not on the real purpose of the reunion: to be with friends and family. She gets an idea and has everypony join in to help rebuild the barn, which everyone is happy to help contribute to, thus making the reconstruction a memorable event of the reunion.
61	9	"Spike at Your Service"	Story by : Dave Polsky; Teleplay by : Merriwether Williams	December 29, 2012	310	0.43
After stopping a hot-air balloon from floating away, Spike got attacked by timberwolves in the Everfree Forest. When Applejack saves him, Spike insists on helping her around the farm in order to repay a life debt that is customary to dragons. His efforts only make trouble for her and the other ponies, and they set up a fake timberwolf attack for Spike so that he can save Applejack from, thus making him feel satisfied with his debt. Their ruse draws a pack of real timberwolves, which Applejack easily crushes, but the pieces form into a single giant beast and she gets caught in a rockslide. Spike causes the timberwolf to fall apart by throwing a rock down its throat and frees Applejack. Afterwards, Applejack convinces Spike to give up his debt.
62	10	"Keep Calm and Flutter On"	Story by : Teddy Antonio; Teleplay by : Dave Polsky	January 19, 2013	311	0.42
Princess Celestia orders Twilight and her friends to release and reform Discord, believing Fluttershy will know how to do it best. While the rest of her friends are doubtful at the thought, Fluttershy remains calm and attempts to befriend Discord. When the others discover that Discord created chaos behind their backs, they demand Fluttershy to use her Element of Harmony to return him to stone, but she stands firm and promises not to use her Element against him as a sign of their newfound friendship. When Discord refuses to relent, she angrily walks away, still refusing to use her Element against him, but also ending their friendship. Realizing he never had a friend before in his life, a remorseful Discord realizes that he truly does value Fluttershy's friendship and does not want to lose it. With this revelation, Discord reverts his chaos and regains Fluttershy's trust, voluntarily offering to use his powers for good, much to the others and Celestia's delight.
63	11	"Just for Sidekicks"	Corey Powell	January 26, 2013	308	0.32
When Spike runs out of gems to use for a cake, he comes up with a scheme of pet-sitting for Twilight and her friends while they are off to the Crystal Empire in exchange for gems. Unfortunately, Spike finds the task daunting than he expected and has no time to mix the gems into his cake in which ends up spending his gems as an attempt to restrain the pets. When he, along with the pets and the Cutie Mark Crusaders accidentally board the train to the Crystal Empire, Spike fears being exposed as a fraud when he admits to the pets that he put himself over their needs. The pets then cooperate and stay quiet until the train returns to Ponyville, where Spike happily returns the pets to their owners. However, he absentmindedly eats the last gem before using it for his cake.
64	12	"Games Ponies Play"	Dave Polsky	February 9, 2013	312	0.39
Occurring in the same storyline as "Just for Sidekicks", Princess Cadance asks Twilight and her friends to help prepare the Crystal Empire for the arrival of the games inspector Ms. Harshwhinny, hoping to have the city host the next Equestria Games. With the inspector due to arrive earlier than expected, Cadance must spend time preparing herself styling her ceremonial headdress with Rarity's help and asks the others to greet and give a tour to the inspector. They mistake a tourist as the inspector and give her a grand tour, while the real Ms. Harshwhinny finds herself subject to a number of accidental missteps. By the time the group realize their error, Ms. Harshwhinny has met with the tourist and learns of how great a time she had. Despite her own misfortunes, Ms. Harshwhinny announces the Crystal Empire as the next host city.
65	13	"Magical Mystery Cure"	M.A. Larson	February 16, 2013	313	0.49
Princess Celestia gives Star Swirl the Bearded's notebook to Twilight, which contains an unfinished spell that she thinks Twilight can complete. When Twilight recites the spell, it causes her friends, through the Elements of Harmony, to have their cutie marks and respective destinies switched, resulting in disasters around Ponyville. Twilight finds a means to convince each of her friends of their proper place with the help of the Elements, restoring her friends to normal, and is able to complete Star Swirl's spell by accounting for her friendships. When she does so, Twilight is teleported by the Elements to an ethereal place, where Celestia congratulates her on completing her journey, and helps her transform into an alicorn and crowns her as a new princess. Twilight's ascension is celebrated by her friends and across Equestria.

== DVD release ==
Shout! Factory, which owns the DVD publishing rights for the series within Region 1, released multiple DVDs. Adventures in the Crystal Empire, Pinkie Pie Party, Princess Twilight Sparkle, and A Pony for Every Season were released for Region 1 markets containing episodes from the third season, bundled with episodes from previous seasons. The complete season was released on February 4, 2014.

My Little Pony: Friendship Is Magic: Season Three
Set details	Special features
13 episodes; 2-disc set; 16:9 aspect ratio; Subtitles: English	2013 San Diego Comic Con Panel; Sing-Alongs ("The Ballad of the Crystal Empire" and "A True, True Friend")
Release dates
Region 1
February 4, 2014
