= Princess Twilight Sparkle (My Little Pony: Friendship Is Magic episodes) =

- My Little Pony: Friendship Is Magic episodes
- Episode nos.: Season 4 Episodes 1 and 2
- Directed by: Jayson Thiessen (supervising); Jim Miller (co-director)
- Written by: Meghan McCarthy
- Original air date: November 23, 2013
- Running time: 44 minutes (combined)

Guest appearances
- John de Lancie as Discord; Brenda Chichlow as Zecora

Episode chronology
← Previous "Magical Mystery Cure" "My Little Pony: Equestria Girls"	Next → "Castle Mane-ia"
- My Little Pony: Friendship Is Magic (season 4)

"Princess Twilight Sparkle" is the collective name for the first and second episodes of the fourth season of animated television series My Little Pony: Friendship Is Magic as well as the sixty-sixth and sixty-seventh overall. The episodes follow the newly crowned Princess Twilight Sparkle, who travels back to her hometown of Ponyville from Canterlot after Princesses Celestia and Luna disappear, and the Everfree Forest invades Ponyville. As Twilight and her friends try to find the cause of the havoc, they discover the Tree of Harmony, where they give up the Elements of Harmony to save Equestria.

With a script finalized by August 2012, "Princess Twilight Sparkle" is intended to convey the title character's resilience as a leader and her developments in self-confidence, action, and triumph. Aired back-to-back on November 23, 2013, they received mixed reviews from critics, who praised the characters and theme of friendship but criticized them in comparison to other episodes.

== Plot ==
External videos
- Princess Twilight Sparkle: Parts 1 & 2 (full episode) — Official upload of the episode onto YouTube

=== Part 1 ===
Twilight struggles to adjust to her new wings and duties as a princess; she prepares for the Summer Sun Celebration and is depressed that she will spend it without her friends as that was what brought them together. Applejack reassures her that, while the celebration did bring them together, it is the Elements of Harmony that will keep them connected no matter what. Shortly after consoling Twilight that night, Princess Celestia is attacked by a black vine. Twilight awakens the next morning to find that Celestia and Luna have disappeared, leaving the sun and moon hanging in the sky, now split between day and night. In addition, the castle guards inform her of an overgrowth of black plants from the Everfree Forest near Ponyville. The only princess left to give them orders, Twilight tells the guards to continue their search for the princesses while she returns to Ponyville to gather the Elements. Twilight and her friends suspect that Discord is responsible, due to the havoc being similar to his previous chaos, and summon him for answers; he claims he is innocent, however, and refuses to help them. The ponies consult Zecora, who, having abandoned the forest, gives Twilight a potion she says will help her learn what is causing the havoc. After drinking the potion, Twilight finds herself in an unfamiliar castle with Princess Luna, who transforms into Nightmare Moon.

=== Part 2 ===
Celestia enters and is attacked by Nightmare Moon, plummeting to the floor. As Twilight sobs over Celestia's defeat, the latter recovers and summons the Elements of Harmony. Twilight realizes that Luna's transformation is a vision of the past caused by Zecora's potion as the elements no longer look this way. After watching Celestia reluctantly banish Luna to the moon, Twilight sees another flashback; in this one, she witnesses Celestia and Luna's discovery of the Elements of Harmony at the mystical Tree of Harmony in the Everfree Forest shortly after they defeated Discord, who was throwing strange seeds everywhere. Afterwards, she deduces that the Tree of Harmony is in danger and enters the forest with her friends and the Elements.

After the group narrowly escape a Cragadile, Twilight is sent away by her friends as they grow concerned for her safety. Discord, however, mocks her for putting herself before her friends, prompting her to rejoin them. Without her, Twilight's friends find the Tree of Harmony but do not know what to do to prevent it from dying. While looking for them, Twilight is attacked by plants, which quickly weaken her; her friends save her and apologize to her, admitting they were wrong because they are lost without her.

Finding the tree entangled by evil vines, Twilight deduces that it needs the Elements to survive; her friends protest to this idea, however, as they believe they need the Elements to protect Equestria and keep themselves connected. Twilight retorts by saying it is their friendships, not the Elements, that keep them connected. She returns them to the tree, eradicating the plants and freeing Celestia and Luna. The tree then sprouts a flower containing a chest with six keyholes, mystifying the ponies. Back in Ponyville, Discord admits to sowing the evil plants shortly before his original defeat when throwing the seeds, intending to capture Princesses Celestia and Luna and plunder the tree's magic, which was so powerful that it prevented this from happening for over 1000 years; he claims to have deliberately withheld this, however, so Twilight would learn how to be a proper leader. The Summer Sun Celebration then commences, with Twilight participating before her cheering friends.

== Cast ==
- Tara Strong as Princess Twilight Sparkle
- Ashleigh Ball as Applejack, Rainbow Dash and Girl Pony
- Andrea Libman as Pinkie Pie and Fluttershy
- Tabitha St. Germain as Rarity, Princess Luna/Nightmare Moon and Boy Pony
- Cathy Weseluck as Spike
- Nicole Oliver as Princess Celestia
- John de Lancie as Discord
- Brenda Crichlow as Zecora
- Claire Corlett as Sweetie Belle
- Peter New as Big Mac, Royal Guard #2 and Messenger Pony
- Andrew Francis as Royal Guards #1 & #3 and Train Conductor

== Production ==
The episodes' scripts were finalized in August 2012. The Hub released an exclusive preview of the first part's script on November 2, 2013, on Twitter and Facebook. Episode writer Meghan McCarthy stated the episodes lacked songs because there was "[n]o room". The episodes intend to convey Twilight's resilience as a leader as well as her development in self-confidence, action, and triumph. In the storyboard, her physical strength and power are expressed using dynamic action and a dramatic point of view. The episodes also feature a "Cragadile" (a monstrous crocodile), which was originally named the "Rockadile" but was renamed due to failure to get permission. As of 2015, Mary Jane Begin, author and illustrator of My Little Pony: The Art of Equestria, considers the Cragadile the most realistic of Friendship Is Magic's creatures and the most threatening of the aquatic animals.

== Broadcast and reception ==
The episodes premiered back-to-back on November 23, 2013, on The Hub following a special airing of My Little Pony: Equestria Girls. Sonia Saraiya of The A.V. Club gave the episodes a "B" in her mixed review. She found them less thrilling than other episodes and called it an impasse. However, she found the theme of friendship pleasant and said: "[I]t could set up a season that is better than ever." Unleash the Fanboy's Daniel Alvarez gave the episodes four out of five stars, calling "a solid premiere". Though considering them less "epic" than expected and previous premieres, he praised the characters, especially Discord, and the flashbacks.

== Home media ==
"Princess Twilight Sparkle" has been included in the season four DVD by Shout! Factory, released in December 2014. In February 2018, the company made "Spring Into Friendship", which contained both parts of this premiere along with three other episodes, available.
