= Wonderbolts Academy =

- My Little Pony: Friendship Is Magic episode
- Rainbow Dash (left) races with fellow Wonderbolt Academy recruit Lightning Dust (right).
- Episode no.: Season 3 Episode 7
- Written by: Merriwether Williams
- Original air date: December 15, 2012
- Running time: 22 minutes

Episode chronology
← Previous "Sleepless in Ponyville"	Next → "Apple Family Reunion"
- My Little Pony: Friendship Is Magic season 3

"Wonderbolts Academy" (also called "Wonderbolt Academy") is the seventh episode of the third season of the animated television series My Little Pony: Friendship Is Magic. The episode was written by Merriwether Williams. It originally aired on The Hub on December 15, 2012. In this episode, Rainbow Dash is accepted into the Wonderbolt Academy where she meets Lightning Dust, a reckless pegasus whose dangerous flying puts Rainbow Dash's friends in peril.

== Plot ==
External videos
- Wonderbolts Academy (full episode) — Official upload of the episode onto YouTube

Rainbow Dash receives her acceptance letter to the prestigious Wonderbolt Academy and eagerly reports for training, where she meets the demanding instructor Spitfire and fellow cadet Lightning Dust. During initial trials, both pegasi excel far beyond their peers. Despite Rainbow's superior performance, Spitfire assigns Lightning Dust as lead pony and makes Rainbow her wingpony, explaining that Lightning Dust shows more willingness to push her limits.

Under Lightning Dust's leadership, the pair dominates their training exercises through increasingly reckless flying maneuvers that put both themselves and other cadets at risk. Rainbow expresses concern about their dangerous tactics, but Lightning Dust dismisses her worries and Spitfire appears to approve of their aggressive approach. Meanwhile in Ponyville, Pinkie Pie becomes obsessed with checking the mail for news from Rainbow and eventually convinces the other ponies to deliver a care package to the academy in person.

During a cloud-clearing competition, Lightning Dust proposes creating a tornado to gain an advantage, and Rainbow reluctantly agrees. The tornado quickly spirals out of control and threatens the Mane Six, who arrive at the academy in their balloon just as the twister tears through the training grounds. Rainbow abandons the exercise to save her friends, creating a cloud trampoline that launches them to safety after they get thrown from their balloon.

Fed up with Lightning Dust's callousness, Rainbow confronts both her partner and Spitfire. When Spitfire commends Lightning Dust's maneuver as an "effective tactic", Rainbow protests the rewarding of sheer recklessness and quits the academy. Spitfire quickly realizes her error and acknowledges that being the best should never come at others' expense, dismissing Lightning Dust and promoting Rainbow to lead pony.

== Reception ==
Sherilyn Connelly, the author of Ponyville Confidential, gave the episode a "C+" rating. Hillary Busis of Entertainment Weekly noted the various references to Top Gun throughout the episode; she humorously remarked that there was no climactic battle against the Soviets at the end of the episode. Daniel Alvarez of Unleash The Fanboy gave the episode a rating of 3.5 out of 5 and called it "rather disappointing" in terms of story expectations but also wrote that it was possibly the best one focused on Rainbow Dash. He praised Lightning Dust as a good character who served her purpose as a meaner version of Rainbow and highlighted Spitfire as a definite highlight, though he criticized the missed opportunity of not featuring other Wonderbolts.

In a critical analysis of the episode, author Jen A. Blue described "Wonderbolts Academy" as a Top Gun homage and analyzed Lightning Dust as essentially being Rainbow Dash herself with all her brashness, boldness, and recklessness, but lacks Rainbow Dash's tendencies toward complacency and laziness. Blue argued that Lightning Dust represents pre-"Mysterious Mare Do Well" Rainbow Dash, utterly unconcerned about collateral damage from her actions, and serves as an externalization of all Rainbow Dash's competitiveness and callousness so that Rainbow Dash can confront and restrain these traits. Blue interpreted Rainbow Dash's decision to quit the Academy as an act of extreme loyalty, choosing her Element over her ambition, and concluded that "for Rainbow Dash, this episode is an exorcism and a maturation" which demonstrates how Lightning Dust successfully pushed Rainbow Dash to discover her limits and align herself with her Element of Harmony.

== See also ==
- List of My Little Pony: Friendship Is Magic episodes
