= Too Many Pinkie Pies =

- My Little Pony: Friendship Is Magic episode
- A horde of Pinkie Pies begin cloning themselves at the Mirror Pool.
- Episode no.: Season 3 Episode 3
- Written by: Dave Polsky
- Original air date: November 17, 2012
- Running time: 22 minutes

Episode chronology
← Previous "The Crystal Empire"	Next → "One Bad Apple"
- My Little Pony: Friendship Is Magic season 3

"Too Many Pinkie Pies" is the third episode of the third season of the animated television series My Little Pony: Friendship Is Magic. The episode was written by Dave Polsky. It originally aired on The Hub on November 17, 2012. In this episode, Pinkie Pie uses the Mirror Pool to create clones of herself so she can spend time with all her friends simultaneously, but the situation spirals out of control when the clones begin creating more clones.

== Plot ==
External videos
- Too Many Pinkie Pies (full episode) — Official upload of the episode onto YouTube

The episode opens with a shot of an apple on the screen. The camera pans out to show Twilight Sparkle, who is seen trying to turn it into an orange. However, she fails. Spike encourages her to try again. Twilight says that the spell may be tough, but she feels lucky this time. But when she tries again, it fails once more. Pinkie Pie appears, causing Twilight's aim to get thrown off. She is upset and asks Pinkie why she did that. She says that hugs are fun, especially when you put one around a friend. Then Pinkie spots a “cute orange birdie” and then asks Twilight to turn her into an orange next. Rarity then appears, showing off her latest outfit that she made. However, Pinkie Pie thinks she missed out on it and starts freaking out. She spots Rainbow Dash lying on a cloud, Applejack wheelbarrow racing, and Fluttershy having a picnic with her animal friends. Pinkie then says that having fun is hard, before collapsing from exhaustion.

Fluttershy allows Pinkie to rest in her butterfly grove while she gets her strength back. Then she says that she has so many wonderful friends having fun all over Ponyville and she cannot figure out how to keep up with it all. Fluttershy says that she can promise not to do anything fun at all if that would help. Then Rainbow Dash and Applejack appear and tell her that they have plans as well. Pinkie Pie then starts to feel overwhelmed because she does not know what to do. She accidentally bumps into Twilight, and she jokingly remarks that her goal can only be met if there's more of her to go around. In a moment of realization, Pinkie Pie remembers the legend of the Mirror Pool and rushes off.

Pinkie enters the Everfree Forest and, as guided from a rhyme from her Nana's story, eventually stumbles across a hole that leads to an underground chamber with a pool of water. As she stars at the water's surface, Pinkie recites more of the rhyme, causing her reflection to step through the water and emerge from the pool as a clone. As the new figure hops excitedly around the room in search of fun, Pinkie instructs her to follow her back to Ponyville.

When they arrive back to Ponyville again, the two Pinkies decide to split up so that they participate in both Rainbow Dash and Applejack's activities. The real Pinkie decides to go play in a pond, where Rainbow Dash is relaxing and clone Pinkie decides to head off to Sweet Apple Acres for a barn raising. However, she ends up getting sidetracked when Fluttershy invites her to join a picnic with her animal friends. She is distraught because she does not know which activity to attend, so the clone Pinkie returns to the real Pinkie and breaks down crying as she explains the situation. Pinkie decides to create more clones so that they can take part in every event without missing out on the others. Pinkie and the clone return to the Mirror Pool to duplicate themselves into four Pinkie Pies, but when the real Pinkie makes to leave, the clones perform several more duplications on their own, which cause even more Pinkies to appear. Brushing past her frustration about it, Pinkie rallies the group and leads them back to Ponyville, where she lets them loose after quizzing them on her friends' names.

At the pond, Rainbow Dash is woken up from a nap by a large group of Pinkie Pies chanting "fun" as they frolic around the area. The real Pinkie arrives soon after but decides to check in with Applejack instead when she sees Rainbow angrily fending off the clones. Upon reaching Sweet Apple Acres, however, Pinkie discovers that the Apple family's barn raising efforts have been disrupted by a swarm of clones jumping around the construction site. Applejack angrily demands an explanation as to where they all came from so that she can find out who is responsible ruining the barn raising. The existing barn structure collapses. Hiding behind a hay bale, Pinkie Pie immediately regrets her decision and wonders what she has done to all her friends.

After all the chaos, the scene then switches to the Golden Oak Library, where a group of angry townsfolk are gathered outside. Twilight tries to calm them all down, however everyone is so upset over all the property damages that have been caused. Rarity says that she had a Pinkie hurricane raging through her shop and Fluttershy says that their critter picnic got ruined. The other ponies then start complaining, and Twilight tells them to hang on while she figures something out. She and Spike run inside while Twilight tries to figure out the name of the legend that Pinkie mentioned earlier. They search the library for information and eventually find a hidden book describing a "Mirror Pond". Inside, there is a spell that can send the Pinkies back to where they originally came from. However, there is a catch, and that is if they cannot determine which one is the real Pinkie, then she might get sent back by mistake.

Twilight and Spike exit the library and solicit advice from the crowd on how to weed out the clones. The real Pinkie approaches and tries to ask Twilight for help, but when a group of duplicates suddenly appear and claim to be the original, Twilight and Spike realize that they can't distinguish between them and that they will not talk to any of the real Pinkies unless they are the real one. As the clones disperse and wreak havoc across town, the pair find a Pinkie moping at an outdoor table and question her. Though initially despondent, the Pinkie eventually suggests that they give them all a test so boring that only the Pinkie who wants to remain with her friends will pass. Twilight agrees to the idea and heads off to prepare.

Twilight informs Rainbow Dash, Fluttershy, and Rarity of the plan and leads them to the town hall. Applejack rounds up most of the Pinkies and funnels them inside, soon followed by Rainbow Dash carrying in a single sad-looking Pinkie. Twilight then says that the Pinkies have been brought to the barn to take a test. At first they are sad, but then she reveals that it is a simple test, and whoever passes gets to stay. Unveiling a wall drenched in wet paint, Twilight announces that the gathering will be watching it dry. As they stare at the wall, Pinkies begin getting distracted one by one, whereupon Twilight casts a spell that whisks them back into the Mirror Pool.

As the test concludes, Pinkie Pie is staring at the wall. Twilight says she can look away, saying that she was the only one who actually kept staring at the wall. Pinkie then rejoices as she realizes that she is really her, but then becomes confused as to whether she really is the real Pinkie Pie, but she says she is pretty sure she is and smiles. Pinkie Pie writes a letter to Princess Celestia talking about how it is great to have fun but it is even better to have great friends. She also says that having a lot of friends means you sometimes have to make choices as to who you will spend your time with, but it is fine with her, because she says that good friends will always give you lots of opportunities to have fun, so even if you are missing out, it is not for long.

After the letter is written, Twilight, Big McIntosh, and Pinkie seal the entrance to the Mirror Pool with a boulder. Twilight said that she and the other ponies were thinking they should go out and celebrate. Applejack asks if she wants to wheelbarrow race, Rainbow Dash says she can take everybody on a cloud ride, and Rarity says that she can throw a party with punch and zesty cucumber sandwiches. However, Pinkie has other plans. She then falls on the floor and takes a nap instead. Fluttershy says that it looks like fun. The ponies then laugh and close the door, then the episode ends.

== Reception ==
Sherilyn Connelly, the author of Ponyville Confidential, gave the episode a "B" rating.

In a critical analysis of the episode, author Jen A. Blue examined how "Too Many Pinkie Pies" confronts the flatness of Pinkie Pie's usual portrayal by having her face "avatars of her flat persona in the form of her duplicates" and wrote that the episode functions as a critique of Pinkie Pie's portrayal in fan works, which tend to depict her either as a pure fun-seeker or a chaotic avatar. Blue analyzed Pinkie's character through Daniel Kahneman's theory of two selves and wrote that Pinkie has a developed experiential self but a stunted remembering self, and described how the Mirror Pool creates simplistic duplicates who have no memory and care nothing for the future. She wrote that Pinkie experiences an identity crisis because "surrounded by living Pinkie Pie memes, she is no longer even sure that she is the real Pinkie Pie" and concluded that the final test forces character growth, as Pinkie is forced to use her remembering side to keep her identity and friendships intact.

In the scene where the Pinkie Pie clones are forced to watch paint dry, one clone morphs her face into something that resembles a pony from the third generation of My Little Pony.

Daniel Alvarez of Unleash The Fanboy gave the episode a rating of 4 out of 5 and called it "one of the most entertaining of the series yet." He praised Pinkie Pie as being "at her finest, proving she can lead an episode once again" and complimented the strong writing. Alvarez wrote that the Mirror Pool clone concept was well-executed and appreciated a joke where a Pinkie Pie clone's face morphs into something resembling a pony from the previous generation as "a funny poke at the old My Little Pony for older fans."

Brendan Kachel of flayrah wrote that he liked the episode because "despite the weird premise [...] we get to see Pinkie is aware of the consequences of her actions" and noted that the real Pinkie Pie is devastated when the clones' quest for fun devastates everything else. Hillary Busis of Entertainment Weekly wrote that the episode was "just another day in Equestria". Ed Liu of Anime Superhero News called the episode "fun, but [felt] slightly off" and criticized that the resolution did not work out as well as it should have. Ewan Kirkland compared the theme of "Too Many Pinkie Pies" to that of the season 2 finale "A Canterlot Wedding", writing that both episodes deal with "the substitution of a mechanical double".

== See also ==
- List of My Little Pony: Friendship Is Magic episodes
- "Send in the Clones" (The Simpsons), a segment of the episode "Treehouse of Horror XIII" with a similar plot
