= Keep Calm and Flutter On =

- My Little Pony: Friendship Is Magic episode
- Episode no.: Season 3 Episode 10
- Directed by: James Wootton; Jayson Thiessen (supervising)
- Story by: Teddy Antonio
- Teleplay by: Dave Polsky
- Original air date: January 19, 2013
- Running time: 22 minutes

Guest appearance
- John de Lancie as Discord

Episode chronology
← Previous "Spike at Your Service"	Next → "Just for Sidekicks"
- My Little Pony: Friendship Is Magic (season 3)

"Keep Calm and Flutter On" is the tenth episode of the third season of animated television series My Little Pony: Friendship Is Magic as well as the sixty-second overall. It aired on January 19, 2013. The episode features Fluttershy attempting to reform Discord while the rest of the Mane Six—Twilight Sparkle, Applejack, Rarity, Rainbow Dash, and Pinkie Pie—remains ambivalent on whether he can be good. The episode was highly anticipated and garnered positive reviews from critics, who found it funny and entertaining.

== Plot ==
External videos
- Keep Calm and Flutter On (full episode) — Official upload of the episode onto YouTube

Princess Celestia orders Twilight Sparkle and her friends to release and reform Discord, believing Fluttershy will know how to do it best. While the rest of her friends are doubtful at the thought, Fluttershy remains calm and attempts to befriend Discord. When the others discover that Discord created chaos behind their backs, they demand Fluttershy to use her Element of Harmony to return him to stone, but she stands firm and promises not to use her Element against him as a sign of their newfound friendship. When Discord refuses to relent, she angrily walks away, still refusing to use her Element against him, but also ending their friendship. Realizing he never had a friend before in his life, a remorseful Discord realizes that he truly does value Fluttershy's friendship and does not want to lose it. With this revelation, Discord reverts his chaos and regains Fluttershy's trust, voluntarily offering to permanently use his powers, much to the others and Celestia's delight.

== Background ==
In the episode, Discord makes his first appearance since his debut in "The Return of Harmony", though he was not intended to be a recurring character. "Keep Calm and Flutter On" was a highly anticipated episode because of the return of Discord and the fact Fluttershy would be attempting to reform him.

== Broadcast and reception ==
The episode aired on January 19, 2013, on The Hub. Daniel Alvarez of Unleash the Fanboy gave "Keep Calm and Flutter On" four and a half out of five stars, calling it a "very entertaining episode". He praised Fluttershy and Discord's portrayals and the moral—that the most evil can become good when they see friendship is magic. However, he found that the show "lost its greatest villain", though he expressed interest in what would happen afterwards. The Awkward Reviews graded the episode "B+" for its entertainment in dialogue and Fluttershy's character as well as the comedy. Negative aspects cited included the reduced amount of chaos, continuity issues, and the fact Discord might be tricking the ponies. The Wrap ranked it the tenth best episode of the series.
