= Apple Family Reunion =

- My Little Pony: Friendship Is Magic episode
- The Apple family fix the barn while singing "Raise This Barn".
- Episode no.: Season 3 Episode 8
- Written by: Cindy Morrow
- Original air date: December 22, 2012
- Running time: 22 minutes

Episode chronology
← Previous "Wonderbolts Academy"	Next → "Spike at Your Service"
- My Little Pony: Friendship Is Magic season 3

"Apple Family Reunion" is the eighth episode of the third season of the animated television series My Little Pony: Friendship Is Magic. The episode was written by Cindy Morrow. It originally aired on The Hub on December 22, 2012. In this episode, Applejack takes over organizing the Apple family reunion from Granny Smith.

== Plot ==
External videos
- Apple Family Reunion (full episode) — Official upload of the episode onto YouTube

Applejack volunteers to organize the Apple family reunion when Granny Smith expresses concern about handling the massive number of relatives who plan to attend. Determined to create the most memorable reunion in family history, Applejack studies photographs from previous gatherings and plans elaborate versions of traditional activities like quilting, racing, baking, and group photos.

Dozens of Apple family members arrive at Sweet Apple Acres, and Applejack immediately herds them through her meticulously planned activities without giving anyone time to relax or socialize. The seven-legged race becomes an exhausting multi-stage obstacle course, the quilting circle gets disrupted by noisy sewing machines that prevent conversation, and the baking session turns into a rushed assembly line for apple fritters. Family members grow increasingly frustrated as Applejack's rigid schedule prevents them from simply enjoying each other's company and catching up.

Noticing that her guests look tired rather than entertained, Applejack decides to escalate the excitement with an unplanned hayride. She kicks a tree to create a spectacular display of rainbow-colored fruit bats, but the swarm becomes aggressive when they spot apples in the riders' belongings. The panicked ponies bolt as bats attack the wagon, which careens out of control and crashes directly into the family barn, destroying it.

Devastated, Applejack despairs that she has ruined the entire reunion, but Granny Smith points out that the family actually welcomes the break from her hectic schedule. Applejack remembers they still need the barn for their group photo and she suggests rebuilding it together as their final activity. The Apple family members enthusiastically collaborate on the construction project, finally getting the chance to bond while working toward a common goal and singing a song ("Raise This Barn"). They complete the new barn and take their group picture, and Applejack writes to Princess Celestia that it does not take much to have a memorable time with ponies you care about.

== Reception ==
Sherilyn Connelly, the author of Ponyville Confidential, gave the episode a "C" rating. Hillary Busis of Entertainment Weekly called the design of baby Applejack in the episode "adorable". Daniel Alvarez of Unleash The Fanboy gave the episode a rating of 3.5 out of 5 and called it a "fine episode and probably the best Applejack-centered one." Alvarez praised the song "Raise This Barn" and predicted it would be remembered as a classic.

In a critical analysis of the episode, author Jen A. Blue positioned "Apple Family Reunion" as a transitional episode that carefully establishes the absence of Applejack's parents through the appearance of paired shooting stars and their deliberate omission from the reunion, comparing Applejack to Batman in terms of being an orphaned character. Blue analyzed the episode within the context of the show's declining quality following Lauren Faust's departure, arguing that "the magic is leaking out of the show—and it's flowing into the fandom," and compared Applejack's attempts to force magic into the reunion to the show's own struggles to recapture its original spark. Blue further interpreted the barn's collapse and rebuilding as eucatastrophe, arguing that the episode demonstrates how the show needs to calm down and return to what it does best rather than pursuing experimental directions.

== See also ==
- List of My Little Pony: Friendship Is Magic episodes
