= Bad Apple =

Bad Apple may refer to:

- Bad apples, an English metaphor
- "Bad Apple!!", background music from a 1998 Touhou Project game, which spawned a 2007 remix and 2009 shadow-art music video
- "Bad Apple", a song from Colourmeinkindness, 2012 by Basement
- "Bad Apple", a song by Cameron Whitcomb, 2025
- "Bad Apples" (song), by Guns N' Roses, 1991
- Bad Apple (film), 2004, by Adam Bernstein
- Bad Apples (2018 film), a film by Bryan Coyne
- Bad Apples (2025 film), an American comedy thriller film
- Bad Apples Music, an Indigenous Australian record label
- Bad Apples, a storyline in the comic book Chew, republished as a trade paperback in 2013

== See also ==
- "One Bad Apple", a 1970 song by The Osmonds
- "One Bad Apple" (My Little Pony: Friendship Is Magic), an episode of My Little Pony: Friendship Is Magic
