= The Crystal Empire =

- My Little Pony: Friendship Is Magic episodes
- The Mane Six, Spike, and Shining Armor flee from King Sombra in the Frozen North
- Episode nos.: Season 3 Episodes 1 & 2
- Directed by: James Wootton
- Written by: Meghan McCarthy
- Editing by: Mark Kuehnel; Meghan McCarthy (story)
- Original air date: November 10, 2012
- Running time: 44 minutes (combined)

Guest appearance
- Jim Miller as King Sombra

Episode chronology
← Previous "A Canterlot Wedding"	Next → "Too Many Pinkie Pies"
- My Little Pony: Friendship Is Magic (season 3)

"The Crystal Empire" is the collective name for the first and second episodes of the third season of the animated television series My Little Pony: Friendship Is Magic as well as the fifty-third and fifty-fourth episodes of the series overall. Both parts of the episode were first broadcast on The Hub on November 10, 2012. It was written by Meghan McCarthy, and directed by series director James Wootton.

The episode centers on the reappearance of the Crystal Empire after previously being cursed over a thousand years ago by its tyrant ruler King Sombra before his banishment. Fearing that the power of the Crystal Ponies could be used for evil, Princess Celestia sends Twilight Sparkle and her friends to help Princess Cadance and Shining Armor to protect the Empire from King Sombra's attack.

On its initial airing, the episode achieved the highest viewership for a Friendship Is Magic premiere and continued a growth in viewership for the series from the previous year. It received mixed to positive reviews from critics. While they enjoyed the story, the emotional disconnect and one-dimensional nature of the villain were cited as detractors.

== Plot ==
External videos
- The Crystal Empire: Parts 1 & 2 (full episode) — Official upload of the episode onto YouTube

=== Part 1 ===
Princess Celestia learns of the reappearance of the Crystal Empire. Previously home to the Crystal Ponies over one thousand years before, the empire had been taken over by the tyrant unicorn King Sombra who enslaved the ponies and threatened to conquer Equestria; Celestia and her sister Luna had sealed King Sombra away in ice, but he cursed the empire to vanish as a last effect. Now that it has reappeared, Celestia and Luna fear that Sombra will reappear and re-conquer the empire, becoming too powerful for them to defeat again. Celestia assigns her student Twilight Sparkle with a test of her ability, and hers alone, to help her brother Prince Shining Armor and his wife Princess Cadance to protect the empire.

Twilight travels with her pony friends, as well as Spike, to the arctic where the empire is located. Sombra appears as they near the city, but Shining Armor arrives and protects them as they race for cover within a magic shield around the city. Though they are safe, Shining Armor is afflicted with a dark magic that disables his powers. The mares and Spike meet Princess Cadance at the castle, where she has been enchanting the shield without sleep and little food. Twilight and her friends spread out to ask the citizens about how to protect the empire without Cadance's magic, but find that the Crystal ponies are afflicted with a spell that has erased their memories of anything before King Sombra's reign.

Twilight finds a book about the Crystal Empire's past, learning of a Crystal Fair used to raise the spirits of the Crystal Ponies. She and her friends try to recreate the fair; Twilight assumes that one aspect, a Crystal Heart, is a ceremonial piece and constructs a crude version of it from crystal. As Cadance's magic starts to falter, the fair starts, and the Crystal Ponies soon cheer up and remember their past. Rainbow Dash overhears a pony discussing the part of the ceremony of the fair where they would channel their elated feelings into the Crystal Heart to protect the Empire; Rainbow races back to warn Twilight they need to find the real Crystal Heart, and Twilight discovers that the page about the Heart's powers has been purposely torn out from the book. Just then, Cadance's magic shuts down as she collapses in Shining Armor's arms, allowing King Sombra to surround the Empire.

=== Part 2 ===
With Shining Armor's support, Cadance re-engages the shield, though Sombra's horn lands within the shield and starts to taint the land. Twilight instructs her friends to keep the fair going while hiding the fake Crystal Heart, while she looks for the real one by herself, assured that this is the test Celestia has given her. Spike insists on coming along, promising not to help.

Twilight surmises that King Sombra hid the Heart in the castle, as the Crystal Ponies would never enter it. Twilight's abilities with magic allow her to pass several traps laid by Sombra, including a magic door showing one's darkest fear and a seemingly infinite staircase. She and Spike then reach the top of the castle. They find the Crystal Heart, just as Cadance exhausts her magic completely. As Sombra invades the Empire, Twilight jumps for the Heart but becomes trapped by crystals that prevent her escape when Sombra is alerted to her attempt, while the Heart falls at Spike's feet.

Twilight frets on escaping the trap before realizing the only solution is to have Spike deliver the Heart to Cadance, even though she believes she will fail her test. Spike races ahead of King Sombra's attacks but falls off with the Heart. Shining Armor throws Cadance at Spike and the Heart; she catches both before King Sombra can get there, and glides down to the base of the castle, the Heart restoring both her strength and magic. Quickly placing the Heart in its proper place, Cadance addresses the Crystal Ponies as their princess and instructs them to power the Heart. The positive feelings from the ponies cause the Heart to be recharged, and King Sombra shatters, causing him to explode. With the Heart restored, the Crystal ponies regain their crystalline appearance, and the effect extends to Princess Cadance, Shining Armor, and Twilight and her friends, giving them appearances similar to that of Crystal Ponies while they remain in the city.

Twilight and her friends return to Canterlot. While Spike is considered the hero of the adventure, Twilight passes her test, having demonstrated self-sacrifice by putting the needs of others ahead of her own. Twilight and her friends celebrate her success while Celestia and Luna look at a mysterious book. (Note: Later revealed to be Star Swirl's notebook in "Magical Mystery Cure")

== Production ==
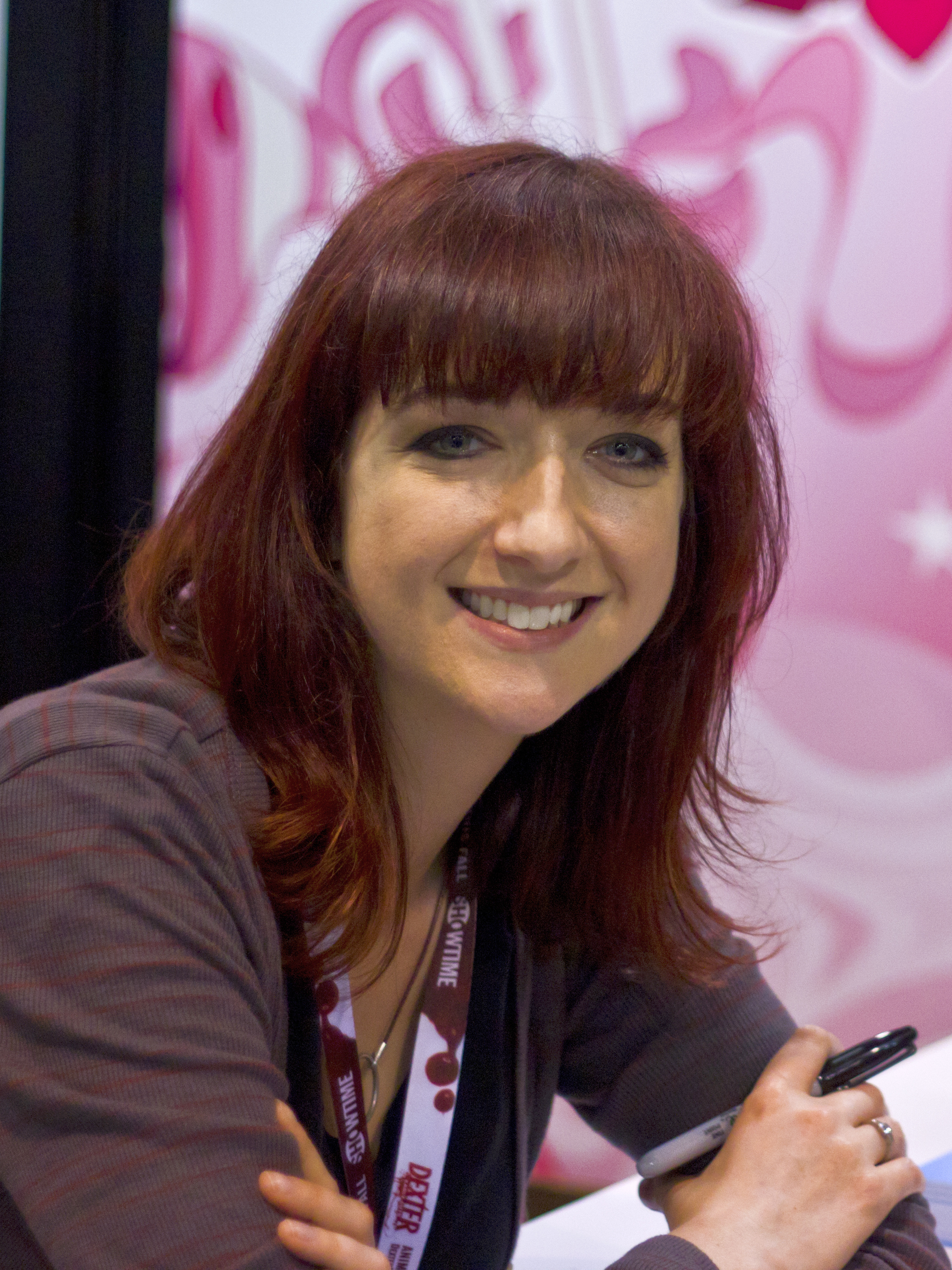
The episodes mark the first time series creator Lauren Faust had no input.

The episode was written by Meghan McCarthy and directed by James Wootton. Jayson Thiessen served as supervising director. The episodes mark the first time that series developer Lauren Faust had no input. Faust had previously served as executive producer during season one, and as consulting producer during season two. At the 2012 San Diego Comic-Con, a preview of "The Failure Song" was shown, which, according to Entertainment Weekly, was "the much-anticipated singing debut for Spike the Dragon". Scenes from "The Crystal Empire"—including the empire, King Sombra, and Pinkie Pie as a spy—were shown at the My Little Pony panel at the 2012 New York Comic Con. Episode writer McCarthy and others stated that they were interested in world-building the history of Equestria, since they were not bound by previous series, and that this episode would explore other parts of Equestria.

King Sombra's design was meant to illustrate him "as both a solid creature and a flowing mass of smoky darkness." The design team decided to make him lack color to describe his evil demeanor and punctuated it using his red eyes and cape. His shape was bulkier and more elongated to imply he was a once-powerful ruler. When changing from one form to another, Sombra bore vague resemblance to Queen Chrysalis with his face, thin body, and legs. The Crystal Empire's castle, while occupied by Sombra, had sharp steeples and a dark palette to demonstrate its sinister atmosphere. The sky also had indicators of "smoglike haze that seems to emanate from King Sombra's dark soul."

== Broadcast and reception ==
=== Ratings ===
Both parts of "The Crystal Empire" first aired back-to-back on The Hub in an hour-long event on November 10, 2012. Upon its airing, the premiere was viewed by an estimated 578,000 to 686,000 people across over 300,000 households; all demographics received a triple-digit percentage increase. Additionally, the episodes became the most viewed season premiere and signified the third consecutive year of growth in them.

=== Reviews ===
Noel Kirkpatrick of TV.com appreciated the adventure and several moments of comedy. Despite this, she felt there was an emotional disconnect between some of the plot elements, such as the lack of connection between King Sombra's rule and Twilight and her friends, or on the impact of Celestia's test on the events. Daniel Alvarez of Unleash the Fanboy awarded the episode five stars out of five and called it "a truly great premiere to a great show" with a premise that "is pretty much perfect". He did, however, criticize King Sombra, noting that the character "has virtually no backstory, and is just there". Alvarez did enjoy the design of the villain but ultimately felt that was the only positive thing about the character.

== Home media ==
The two-part episode is part of the "Adventures in the Crystal Empire" Region 1 DVD by Shout Factory, which was released on December 4, 2012. It has also been released as part of the complete Season 3 DVD set.
