= One Bad Apple (My Little Pony: Friendship Is Magic) =

- My Little Pony: Friendship Is Magic episode
- The Cutie Mark Crusaders (right) run from Babs Seed (left) during the song "Babs Seed".
- Episode no.: Season 3 Episode 4
- Directed by: James Wootton; Jayson Thiessen (supervising)
- Written by: Cindy Morrow
- Original air date: November 24, 2012
- Running time: 22 minutes

Guest appearance
- Brynna Drummond as Babs Seed

Episode chronology
← Previous "Too Many Pinkie Pies"	Next → "Magic Duel"
- My Little Pony: Friendship Is Magic season 3

"One Bad Apple" is the fourth episode of the third season of animated television series My Little Pony: Friendship Is Magic as well as the fifty-sixth overall. It aired on November 24, 2012. The episodes centers around the Cutie Mark Crusaders, who are bullied by Apple Bloom's cousin, Babs Seed. As revenge, they sabotage a cart she will ride in during the parade but realise they are becoming bullies themselves.

== Plot ==
External videos
- One Bad Apple (full episode) — Official upload of the episode onto YouTube

Apple Bloom's cousin from Manehattan, Babs Seed, comes to visit Ponyville. Apple Bloom, Sweetie Belle, and Scootaloo welcome her at the train station. The trio try to persuade Babs Seed to join the Cutie Mark Crusaders by showing her their clubhouse. As Babs keeps looking, Diamond Tiara and Silver Spoon come to make fun of the Crusaders, and Babs ends up joining them in teasing and hounding. Sweetie Belle suggests that they should go and tell Applejack about Babs. Apple Bloom, however, insists that they have to fight back.

As the Summer Harvest Parade is about to start, the Crusaders try to get back at Babs by booby-trapping a parade float that they trick her into driving. As Babs start driving however, Applejack comes and praises the Crusaders for letting Babs drive, explaining that the reason Babs is visiting is that she was bullied by others back in Manehattan for not having a cutie mark.

Realizing that Babs was bullying them to not get bullied herself, the Crusaders catch up to the faulty float Babs is driving and push her out before it falls off a cliff into muddy water. Together, they apologize for their actions. Babs joins the Crusaders and defends her new friends from Diamond Tiara and Silver Spoon at the train station before returning home.

== Background ==
In October 2012, My Little Pony: Friendship Is Magic head writer Meghan McCarthy announced an episode about bullying, with a "fun and funny [story], and [...] music". She further stated it would include exploration on managing bullies and the origin of bullies while not feeling awkward. Entertainment Weekly's Hillary Busis believed it related to the zeitgeist. While Daniel Alvarez of Unleash the Fanboy considered most of Friendship Is Magic's episodes to have good morals, they were not about "current" issues, a role which "One Bad Apple" fulfilled.

== Broadcast and reception ==
The episode aired on November 24, 2012, on The Hub. It gained a viewership of 494,000 and triple-digit year-to-year delivery gains in all demographics. Prior to its premiere, at Entertainment Weekly, Busis called its musical number catchy. Alvarez of Unleash the Fanboy gave "One Bad Apple" four out of five stars, stating "the episode succeeds in its purpose greatly". He praised its morals but expressed disappointment in that none of the other Mane 6—Twilight Sparkle, Fluttershy, Rainbow Dash, Pinkie Pie, and Rarity—were involved in resolving the conflict. Jamie Kingston of WomenWriteAboutComics praised how the episode dealt with the theme of bullying.
