= Steffan Andrews =

- Born: Vancouver, British Columbia, Canada
- Genre: Television
- Occupations: Composer, Orchestrator
- Years active: 2008–present
- Website: orchetect.com

Steffan Andrews is a Gemini-nominated Canadian film, television, and video game music composer known for animated series soundtracks.

Steffan has composed music for hundreds of episodes of television including series, such as Littlest Pet Shop, Pound Puppies, and My Little Pony: Friendship Is Magic. His work has also reached triple-A video game titles and feature films. Steffan's skills cover a diverse palette of genres and styles, from orchestral to acoustic, from comedy to drama, and beyond. Andrews described both John Williams and Michael Giacchino as an influence of his work.

== Film and television scores ==
- Littlest Pet Shop – song orchestrator (seasons 1-2) and composer (seasons 1–4)
- My Little Pony: Friendship Is Magic – song orchestrator and composer, additional music (seasons 1–4)
- Pound Puppies – composer
- Martha Speaks – composer, additional music (seasons 1–5)
- Voltron Force – composer
- League of Super Evil – composer
- Rated A for Awesome – composer
- Edgar & Ellen – composer, additional music (episodes 14–26)
- Kung Fu Magoo – composer
- Battle of the Bulbs – composer, additional music
- Endangered Species – composer
- Cloudy with a Chance of Meatballs – composer
- Mega Man: Fully Charged – composer
- Lego Jurassic World: The Secret Exhibit - composer
- Lego Jurassic World: Legend of Isla Nublar - composer
- Digimon - composer

== Game scores ==
- FaceBreaker, PlayStation 3, Wii, and Xbox 360 (Composer)
- NOMBZ: Night of a Million Billion Zombies, PC & iPhone (Composer)

== Voice acting ==
- Littlest Pet Shop – Sidekick Panda Voiceover (episode: "Super Sunil") (uncredited)

== Awards and nominations ==
- 2022 Canadian Screen Music Award for Best Original Score for a Children's Program or Series (LEGO Marvel Avengers: Time Twisted: winner)
- 2014 Leo Award for Best Musical Score in an Animation Program or Series (My Little Pony: Friendship Is Magic: "Pinkie Pride", nominee)
- 2013 Leo Award for Best Musical Score in an Animation Program or Series (My Little Pony: Friendship Is Magic: "Magical Mystery Cure", winner)
- 2012 Leo Award for Best Musical Score in an Animation Program or Series (Voltron Force: "Deep Blue", nominee)
- 2011 Gemini Award for Best Sound in a Comedy, Variety, or Performing Arts Program or Series (League of Super Evil: "Ant-Archy!", nominee)
- 2011 Leo Award for Best Musical Score in an Animation Program or Series (League of Super Evil: "Ant-Archy!", nominee)
- 2010 Leo Award for Best Musical Score in an Animation Program or Series (League of Super Evil: "Slam Dunked", nominee)
- 2010 Leo Award for Best Musical Score in an Animation Program or Series (League of Super Evil: "The Night Before Chaos-mas", nominee)
