= Sleepless in Ponyville =

- My Little Pony: Friendship Is Magic episode
- A terrified Scootaloo wakes in the middle of the night in the forest.
- Episode no.: Season 3 Episode 6
- Written by: Corey Powell
- Original air date: December 8, 2012
- Running time: 22 minutes

Episode chronology
← Previous "Magic Duel"	Next → "Wonderbolts Academy"
- My Little Pony: Friendship Is Magic season 3

"Sleepless in Ponyville" is the sixth episode of the third season of the animated television series My Little Pony: Friendship Is Magic. The episode was written by Corey Powell. It originally aired on The Hub on December 8, 2012. In this episode, Scootaloo joins a camping trip with the other Cutie Mark Crusaders and their sisters.

The title of the episode is a reference to the romantic comedy Sleepless in Seattle.

== Plot ==
External videos
- Sleepless in Ponyville (full episode) — Official upload of the episode onto YouTube

When Rainbow Dash compliments Scootaloo's scooter riding skills, Scootaloo becomes determined to impress her further and accepts an invitation to join a camping trip to Winsome Falls. The group includes Apple Bloom, Applejack, Sweetie Belle, and Rarity. Scootaloo shares a tent with Rainbow Dash to maximize her opportunities to demonstrate her awesomeness. As they hike through the forest and set up camp, Scootaloo basks in Rainbow's attention and looks forward to proving herself during their outdoor adventure.

Night falls, and Rainbow gathers everyone around the campfire to tell scary stories, beginning with a tale about the terrifying Olden Pony that leaves all three fillies visibly frightened. Scootaloo convinces Rainbow that the story did not affect her, but she suffers nightmares about the ghostly figure chasing her through the woods. Too scared to fall back asleep, she stays awake all night and struggles to hide her exhaustion the next day as they continue hiking toward their destination.

At their second campsite near a cave, Rainbow tells an even more frightening story about the Headless Horse, which again terrifies Scootaloo despite her attempts to appear brave. Princess Luna visits her dreams that night and reveals that Scootaloo's real fear is not the monsters from the stories but the possibility that Rainbow Dash will discover she gets scared. Luna encourages her to face this fear directly.

Scootaloo wakes panicked when she mistakes Rainbow's snoring for the sound of the Headless Horse and flees the cave on her scooter. She crashes into a ravine and gets swept toward a waterfall before Rainbow rescues her and demands an explanation. Following Luna's advice, Scootaloo confesses that she wanted to impress Rainbow but was unable handle the scary stories. Rainbow admits she was also frightened by those same tales when she first heard them and promises to take Scootaloo under her wing, accepting her exactly as she is rather than expecting her to be fearless.

The group reaches Winsome Falls the following day, and Rainbow helps Scootaloo fly. Later, Scootaloo dreams of being chased by the Olden Pony once again, but after confronting it, Rainbow appears and chases the foe away.

== Reception ==
"Sleepless in Ponyville" has the highest IMDb rating out of all the episodes in the third season of Friendship Is Magic, with a score of 8.5. The episode was nominated for the 2013 Leo Award for "Best Overall Sound in an Animation Program or Series" for Marcel Duperreault, Todd Araki, Jason Frederickson, and Adam McGhie, but lost to the Slugterra episode "The World Beneath our Feet Part 1".

Sherilyn Connelly, the author of Ponyville Confidential, gave the episode a "B-" rating. Tyler B. Searle of Collider wrote that "Sleepless in Ponyville" is "a brilliant episode about facing one's fears." Raymond Gallant of Freakin' Awesome Network gave the episode a rating of 9 out of 10 and called it "another top shelf episode for the season" and lauded its writing, cute moments, and strong character development. He praised how the episode finally provided a Scootaloo-centric story that didn't disappoint and commended new writer Corey Powell for understanding the show and its characters. Keith Veronese of Gizmodo humorously remarked that Scootaloo seeks to vanquish her nightmares by watching Meg Ryan movies. Brian Truitt of USA Today called the episode "chilling" in a "kid-friendly way".

In a critical analysis of the episode, author Jen A. Blue described "Sleepless in Ponyville" as "rather mediocre" and criticized the dream sequences as lacking the surreal imagery and disjointedness of real dreams. Blue praised Luna's depiction as similar to Neil Gaiman's Sandman character, noting she is haughty, mysterious, impulsive, and yet bound by complex rules, but criticized the episode's thematic incoherence and character inconsistencies, including unexplained plot elements and Sweetie Belle's sudden inability to sing. She offered a possible alternative interpretation suggesting the entire episode might be a dream, with Scootaloo working through her jealousy of her friends' relationships with their sisters and her hero worship of Rainbow Dash. Blue analyzed the ending where Rainbow Dash carries Scootaloo flying as a first step toward acknowledging her disability: since Scootaloo cannot fly under her own power, her answer is to dream of her hero carrying her.

Daniel Alvarez of Unleash The Fanboy gave the episode a rating of 4 out of 5 and called it "a big thumbs-up for fans," praising how it defines Scootaloo as more than just a younger version of Rainbow Dash and provides good interaction between the two characters. He wrote that the inclusion of Princess Luna and the sisterlike dynamic between Rainbow Dash and Scootaloo were "definitely one of the most heart-felt moments of the entire series."

== See also ==
- List of My Little Pony: Friendship Is Magic episodes
