= Magical Mystery Cure =

- My Little Pony: Friendship Is Magic episode
- Twilight Sparkle (front) crowned as a princess in her new alicorn form
- Episode no.: Season 3 Episode 13
- Directed by: James Wootton
- Written by: M.A. Larson
- Editing by: Mark Kuehnel; Meghan McCarthy (story)
- Original air date: February 16, 2013
- Running time: 22 minutes

Episode chronology
← Previous "Games Ponies Play"	Next → "Princess Twilight Sparkle" "My Little Pony: Equestria Girls"
- My Little Pony: Friendship Is Magic season 3

"Magical Mystery Cure" is the thirteenth and final episode of the third season of the animated television series My Little Pony: Friendship Is Magic and the sixty-fifth episode of the series overall. Directed by James Wootton, it was written by M.A. Larson. The episode's title is a reference to the album Magical Mystery Tour by The Beatles.

In the episode, the destinies and cutie marks of Twilight Sparkle's friends get switched around, forcing Twilight to create a magic spell of her own in order to correct it. Part of the episode focuses on Twilight Sparkle becoming a princess and transforming into an alicorn. The Hub heavily emphasized the event while promoting the episode in a coronation-themed advertising sweepstakes campaign, which included a special concert event featuring Miss America 2013 winner Mallory Hagan, and a nine-episode marathon that preceded the episode's premiere.

Aired on February 16, 2013, on The Hub, the episode became the network's highest-rated telecast among kids aged 2–11. Reception from critics was polarized. Praise was given for the story, while its musical format, believing that it took away from the story element, and Twilight's transformation into an alicorn were criticized. Similarly, a significant fraction of the show's fandom called the transformation a "jump the shark" moment.

== Plot ==
External videos
- Magical Mystery Cure (full episode) — Official upload of the episode onto YouTube

Twilight Sparkle awakens one morning to find that her friends' cutie marks and duties around Ponyville have swapped: Rarity's creativity in doing Rainbow Dash's weather control causes havoc around town; Rainbow is unable to tame Fluttershy's animals; Fluttershy's attempts to throw Pinkie Pie's parties disappoint Ponyville's residents, who become grumpy and tetchy; Pinkie has difficulties working on Applejack's farm, where her apple trees are now bare and blackened; and Applejack's dressmaking skills are awful, forcing her to close Rarity's boutique. Twilight's friends are unaware of the change, believing that they are following their true destinies.

Twilight remembers that Princess Celestia had earlier sent her the notebook of unicorn wizard Star Swirl the Bearded, believing that Twilight can make sense of the incomplete spell on the last page. However, when Twilight read the spell, it inadvertently switched around the Elements of Harmony, affecting their respective bearers. Realizing that she is responsible for her friends' condition, and with no counter-spell to fix it, Twilight blames herself for her friends' misery and Ponyville's resulting desolation.

However, inspired by Spike's compassion, Twilight realizes that if she shows her friends their true destinies and reminds them their meaning to each other, she may be able to reverse the spell. She shows her friends what their true calling is, encouraging them to help each other fix things. One by one, they regain their original cutie marks with the help of their respective Elements, and Ponyville is quickly restored. Twilight realizes that friendship is a factor Star Swirl never accounted for and completes the spell. Upon doing so, the Elements worn by her friends activate, engulfing Twilight in a bright light and causing her to disappear.

Twilight awakens in an ethereal place where she is greeted by Princess Celestia, who congratulates her and declares Twilight is ready for a new stage in her life. Twilight undergoes a transformation and returns as a winged unicorn known as an alicorn. Her friends are amazed and happily welcome her change, while Celestia announces that Twilight is no longer her student, but a princess who has demonstrated leadership and other positive attributes during her stay in Ponyville. Twilight becomes concerned that she is now lost as she is no longer Celestia's student, but the latter promises that they will all help each other learn. Twilight is officially crowned in a grand celebration in Canterlot, where she thanks her friends for being there to help her.

== Cast ==
- Tara Strong as Twilight Sparkle
  - Rebecca Shoichet as Twilight Sparkle's singing voice.
- Ashleigh Ball as Applejack, Rainbow Dash and Salespony
- Andrea Libman as Pinkie Pie and Fluttershy
  - Shannon Chan-Kent as Pinkie Pie's singing voice.
- Tabitha St. Germain as Rarity
  - Kazumi Evans as Rarity's singing voice.
- Cathy Weseluck as Spike and Laughing Pony
- Nicole Oliver as Princess Celestia
- Andrew Francis as Shining Armor

== Production ==
On the topic of Twilight's ascension to becoming a princess, writer Meghan McCarthy explained that Twilight had been embarking on a journey since the first episode of the series that would eventually lead to this outcome. McCarthy explained that the title of princess in Equestria has to be earned by sharing their gifts with others, and that "every little girl wants to be a princess, and not everybody can get to be a princess—but [they] can live up to the ideals that should come along with being a princess." McCarthy noted that, despite Twilight's new role and the new challenges she will face, her personality will remain the same. M.A. Larson stated the script "was heavily altered from his final [one]."

=== Featured songs ===
The episode is primarily a musical. The show's composer Daniel Ingram created seven songs with episode's writer, M.A. Larson who wrote two songs. Ingram wrote most of the songs' lyrics for "I've Got to Find a Way", "A True, True Friend", "Celestia's Ballad", "Behold, Princess Twilight Sparkle", and, with assistance from Larson, "What My Cutie Mark is Telling Me". The lyrics for both "Morning in Ponyville" and "Life in Equestria" were written by Larson. "What My Cutie Mark Is Telling Me", under the title "Find a Way", "I've Got to Find a Way", and "A True, True Friend" are included on the album Songs of Ponyville.

1. "Morning in Ponyville"
2. "What My Cutie Mark is Telling Me"
3. "I've Got To Find a Way"
4. "A True, True Friend"
5. "Celestia's Ballad"
6. "Behold, Princess Twilight Sparkle"
7. "Life in Equestria"

== Promotion ==
On February 9, 2013, The Hub held a "Coronation Concert" in Los Angeles to promote the episode, hosted by Miss America 2013 special guest star Mallory Hagan. Despite stating that she was more of a Strawberry Shortcake fan growing up, Hagan felt honored to participate in the event since she supported the series' aim to teach lessons about friendship and acceptance, considering it "a great way to show little girls that they can be empowered by trying to reach their goals." The premiere of "Magical Mystery Cure" on The Hub was also preceded by a marathon of previous Friendship is Magic episodes. Hasbro also released merchandise later in the year featuring Twilight Sparkle's princess form.

== Broadcast and reception ==
=== Ratings ===
"Magical Mystery Cure" premiered on The Hub on February 16, 2013. Its ratings outperformed its key competitors, such as Disney XD, Cartoon Network, and Nickelodeon. The show also earned triple-digit year-to-year time period delivery gains in almost all demographics. As of September 2013, it is also The Hub's most-viewed telecast among kids aged 2–11.

=== Critical reception and awards ===
Ed Liu of ToonZone (now Anime Superhero) considered the episode felt "rushed and perfunctory", having nearly two separate stories that would have been told better across two separate episodes, and considered that the large number of songs was a contributing factor towards this. While Liu did not consider it a poor episode of the series, he felt the show had done better with emotional conclusions in previous seasons. Daniel Alvarez of Unleash the Fanboy also acknowledged that the musical format took away time from the "great story", but otherwise considered it a "very grand episode". He gave it 4.5 out of 5 stars. Writing for Den of Geek, Ethan Lewis deemed the episode a "disappoint[ment]". He believed promoting someone to a "princess" was inappropriate and that Twilight's transformation was undeserved and would make her miserable and too powerful. The episode and its composers, Daniel Ingram and Steffan Andrews, received a 2013 Leo Award for "Best Musical Score in an Animated Program or Series".

=== Fandom reaction ===
The revelation that Twilight Sparkle would become an alicorn was announced several weeks before the episode's premiere, though this had been rumored months before based on photos of upcoming toy lines from Hasbro. The "brony" fanbase—which encompasses older viewers who had grown to appreciate the series—had mixed reviews to this announcement, with a significant fraction considering it a "jump the shark" moment for the show. Shaun Scotellaro of the fan site Equestria Daily considered this a normal reaction to any changes to the show by the fans, but considered that since many of the older fans connect with Twilight Sparkle as a bookish nerdy character, changes such as this would be dramatic. In response, Tara Strong, the voice actress for Twilight, asserted that the episode is "a birth of a new era for Twilight, but not the end of what makes the show so wonderful".

== Home media ==
The season 3 finale is part of the "Princess Twilight Sparkle" Region 1 DVD by Shout! Factory which was made available in stores on April 30, 2013. It has also been released as part of the complete Season 3 DVD set.
