= The Best Night Ever =

- My Little Pony: Friendship Is Magic episode
- Clockwise from the top: Rarity, Fluttershy, Pinkie Pie, Applejack, Rainbow Dash, and Twilight Sparkle.
- Episode no.: Season 1 Episode 26
- Directed by: Jayson Thiessen
- Written by: Amy Keating Rogers
- Editing by: Rob Renzetti (story)
- Original air date: May 6, 2011
- Running time: 22 minutes

Guest appearance
- Vincent Tong as Prince Blueblood (uncredited)

Episode chronology
← Previous "Party of One"	Next → "The Return of Harmony"
- My Little Pony: Friendship Is Magic season 1

"The Best Night Ever" is the first season finale of the animated television series My Little Pony: Friendship Is Magic. The episode follows Twilight Sparkle and her friends, who try to enjoy the Grand Galloping Gala separately. Each of them finds their expectations disappointed and inadvertently cause chaos through all their attempts to satisfy their wants. The episode aired on May 6, 2011, and was well-received.

== Plot ==
External videos
- The Best Night Ever (full episode) — Official upload of the episode onto YouTube

On the day of the Grand Galloping Gala, Pinkie Pie, Rarity, Fluttershy, Applejack, and Rainbow Dash gather outside the Carousel Boutique and watch as Twilight Sparkle performs a new magic spell to transform an apple into a fancy carriage. Turning to a group of four mice that Fluttershy brought with her, Twilight uses her magic to transform them into large horse-mouse hybrids. As her friends offer tepid reactions, Opalescence appears and attacks the horses, causing them to flee. Twilight wonders how they'll get to the gala without them, but Rarity manages to charm a pair of nearby stallions to pull the carriage.

That night, at the Gala, although Spike hopes to enjoy the Gala together, Twilight and her friends quickly separate to enjoy it in their ways, but each of them soon finds their experience falls well short of their expectations. Twilight intends to talk privately with Princess Celestia, but the latter is repeatedly interrupted by having to welcome other guests to the Gala. Rainbow Dash attempts to impress the Wonderbolts, but their time is continually taken up by other attendees. Rarity spends time with Celestia's nephew, Prince Blueblood, hoping to fall in love with him, only to discover that he is self-absorbed and obnoxious. Applejack opens a stand to sell her family's apple products but makes minimal sales. Fluttershy ends up scaring away the animals she wishes to see in the castle gardens, and tries to set up traps. Pinkie Pie tries to become the life of the Gala but learns that the Gala is a different kind of party than what she dreamed it would be.

As events mount, the friends' actions lead to a mass of chaos in the grand ballroom when Pinkie attempts a stage dive that causes a cake to fly towards Blueblood, who uses Rarity as a shield against the splatter. Rainbow Dash then tries to impress the Wonderbolts by catching a large, wobbling statue before it hits the ground, but loses control of it and causes it to smash several nearby pillars. Finally, several animals from the garden burst inside while fleeing Fluttershy. Twilight and her friends flee the gala, regroup with Spike at a donut shop, and express their disappointment with the night's events. However, they are soon joined by Princess Celestia, who explains that she had invited Twilight and her friends to liven up the normally boring Gala, and is happy with what happened. Everyone agrees the night to be the "best night ever."

== Background ==
"The Best Night Ever" was directed by Jayson Thiessen (supervising) and James Wootton, and written by Amy Keating Rogers. The initial draft of the episode was thirty-nine pages long, six more than a typical My Little Pony: Friendship Is Magic script; it included more extensive version of the "Piggy Dance", which was removed and instead appears in season two episode "Baby Cakes". Prince Blueblood, Rarity's selfish love interest, was originally meant to be a duke, but a member of the approval process believed the target demographic would be unfamiliar with the term. "The Best Night Ever" features three songs written by Daniel Ingram: "At the Gala", "I'm at the Grand Galloping Gala" and "Pony Pokey". Several songs were cut due to being too lengthy. "At the Gala", recorded at Bryan Adams's studio in Vancouver, includes a choir of twenty people with each main character singing a solo part. The song is also based on Stephen Sondheim's Into the Woods. Through this episode, ponies wear dresses, much of which was designed "almost like" four-legged humans.

== Broadcast and reception ==
The episode aired on May 6, 2011, on The Hub. Sherilyn Connelly of SF Weekly called the it "the best My Little Pony: Friendship Is Magic season finale ever". She praised the songs, particularly "At the Gala" and "Pony Pokey", finding the former showstopping, and the latter surprisingly deep and "saddest, most poignant song [Pinkie Pie will] ever sing". Screen Rant ranked the episode the fourth-best season finale according to IMDb.

== Home media ==
"The Best Night Ever", along with four other episodes, was released in August 2012 by Shout! Factory as part of the "Royal Pony Wedding" DVD. It is also included in the company's complete season one collection and Madman Entertainment's season one boxset.
