= Winged unicorn =

Fictional hybrid of a pegasus and unicorn

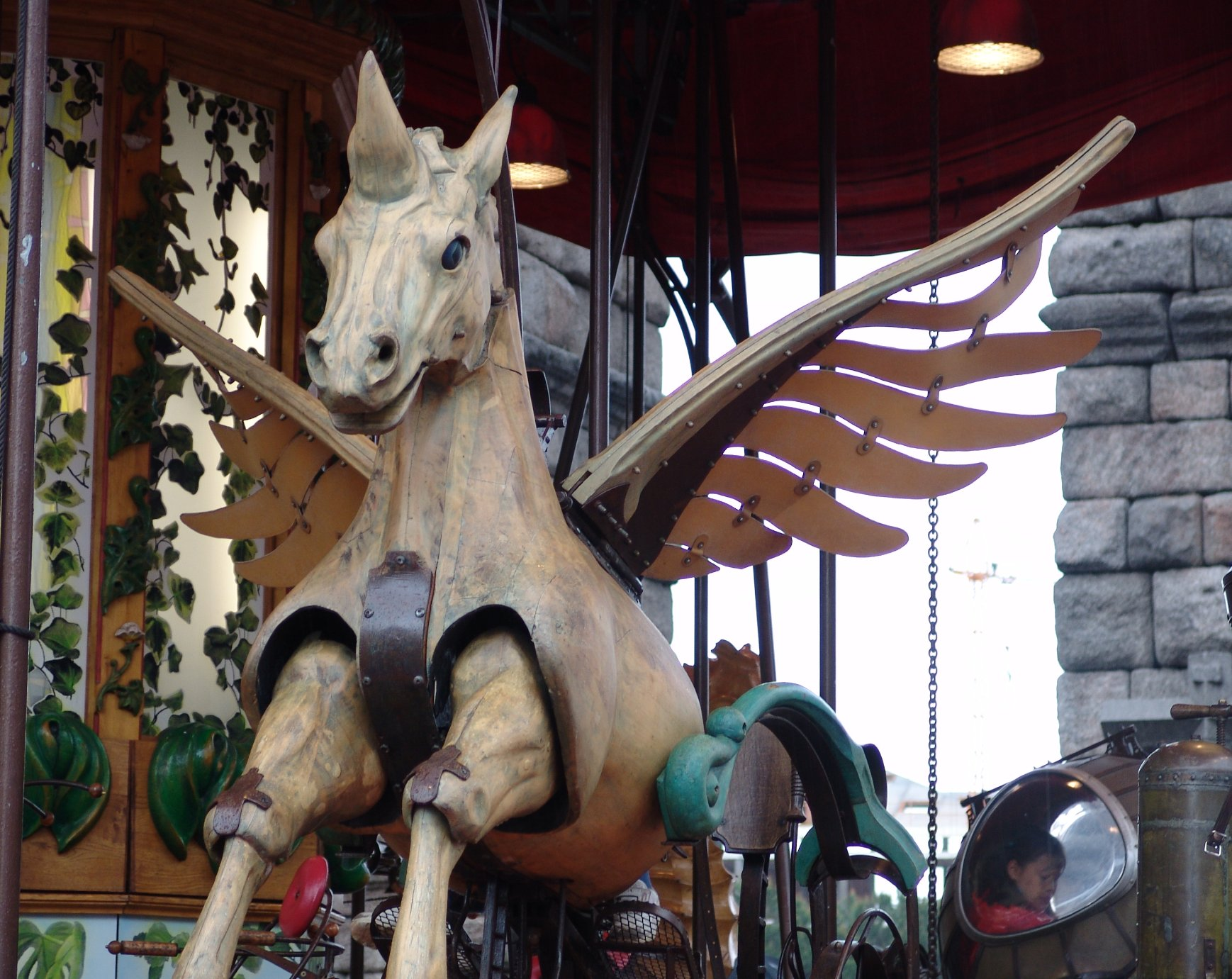
- A winged unicorn on Le Manège d'Andrea

Creature information
- Other name(s): Flying unicorn, Cerapter, Alicorn, Pegacorn, Unisus, Unipeg
- Grouping: Popular culture
- Sub grouping: Syncretism
- Family: Mythological horses

Origin
- Country: Assyria

A Winged Unicorn or Flying Unicorn is a mythical ungulate, typically portrayed as a horse, with feathered wings like a Pegasus and the horn of a Unicorn. It is further featured in modern popular culture and fiction.

== Origin ==
=== Etymology ===
In some literature and media, the winged unicorn has been referred to as an Alicorn, a word derived from the Italian word alicorno, or as a Pegacorn, a portmanteau of pegasus and unicorn.

=== Origin and Symbolism ===
As a combination of the Unicorn and Pegasus, who are characterized as symbols of purity, poetry, reverie, and magic, winged unicorns naturally carry both portfolios of symbolism, and are depicted in drawings and cited in channeling-type visions.

== Ancient depictions ==
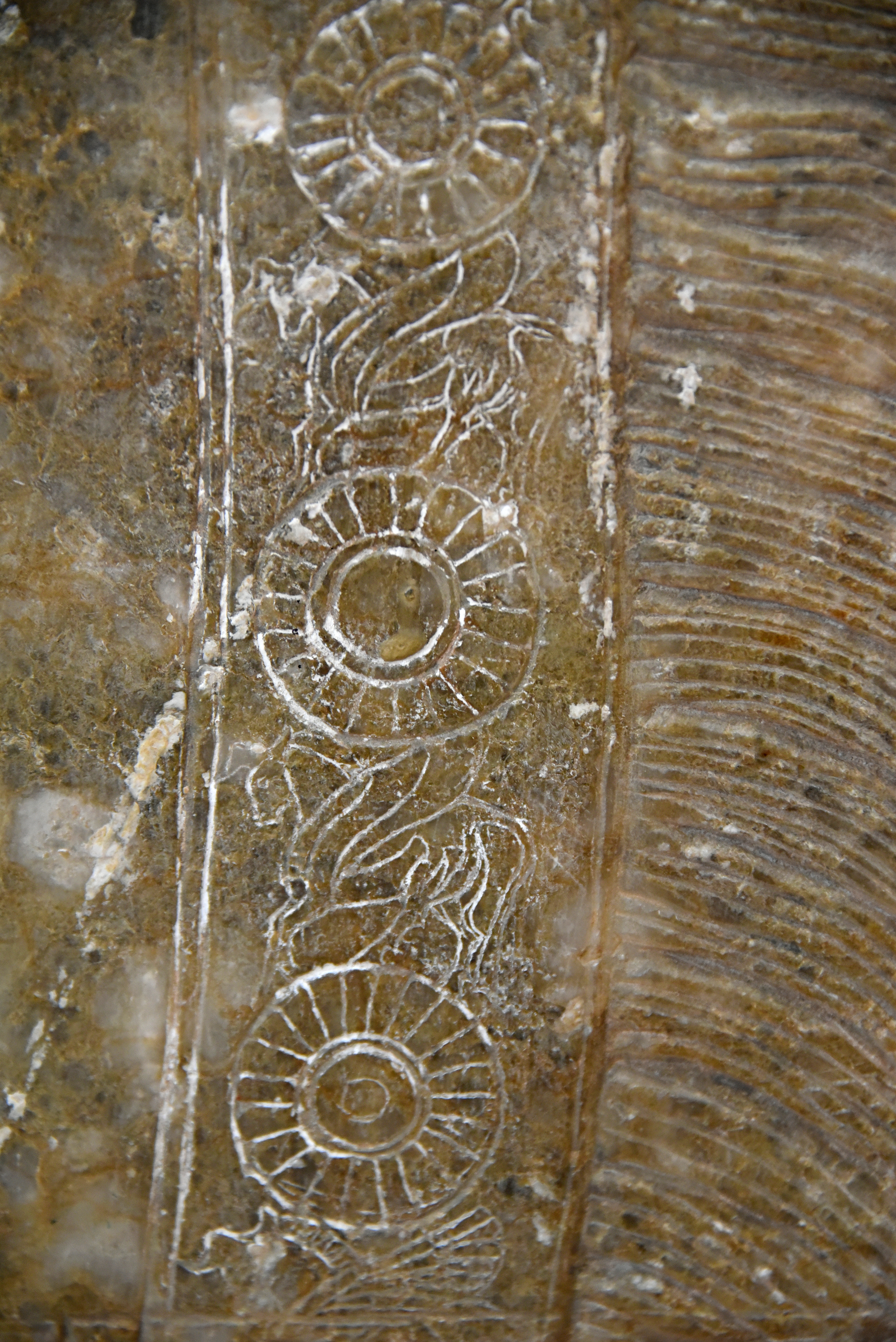
Detail of the embroidered dress of an Apkallu, showing four-legged winged and horned animals. From Nimrud, Iraq. 883–859 BCE. Museum of the Ancient Orient, Istanbul

Winged unicorns have been depicted in art. Ancient Achaemenid Assyrian seals depict winged unicorns and winged bulls as representing evil, but winged unicorns can also represent light.

== In popular culture ==
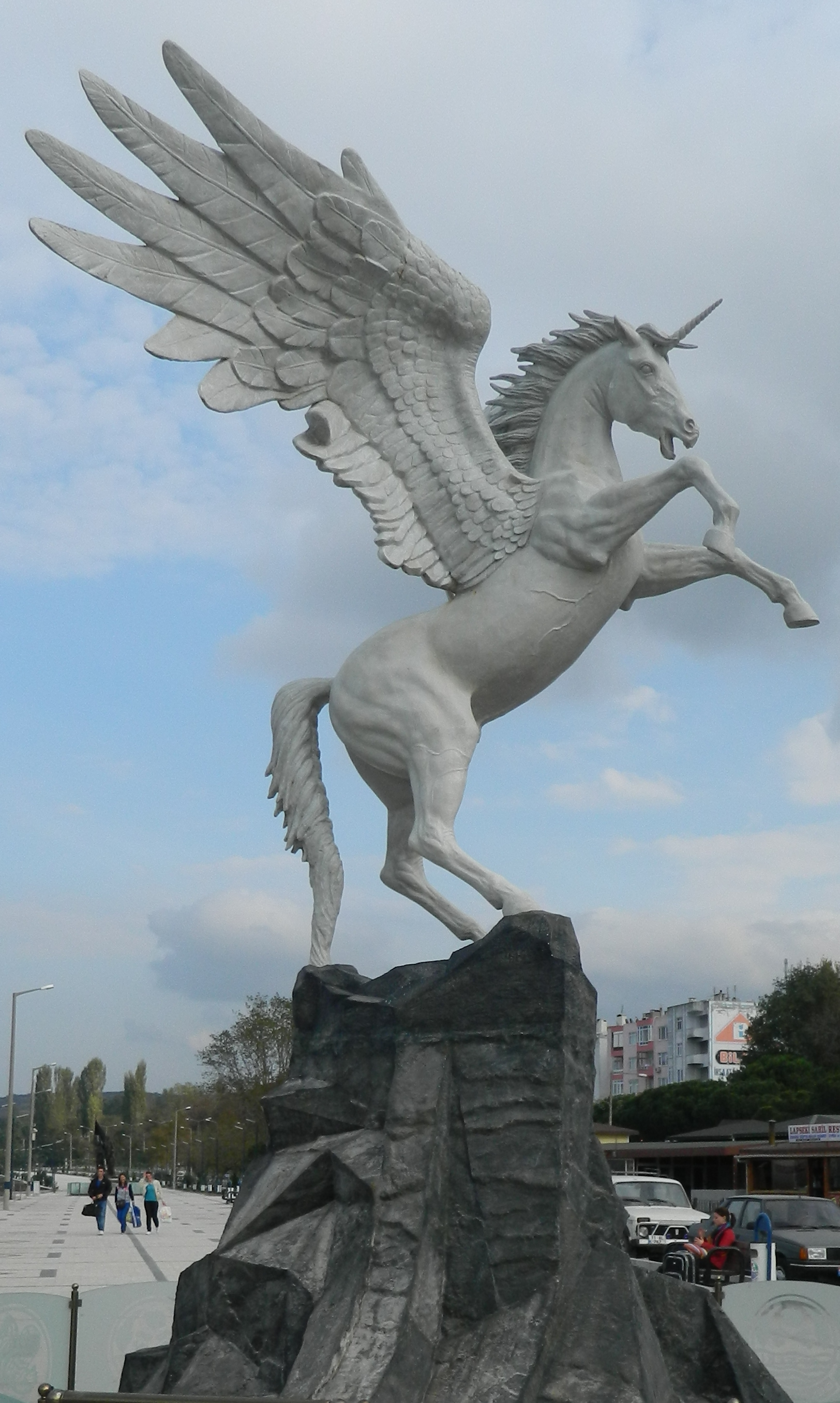
A sculpture of a pegasus with a horn in Lapseki, Turkey

- Irish poet W. B. Yeats wrote of imagining a winged beast that he associated with ecstatic destruction. The beast took the form of a winged unicorn in his 1907 play The Unicorn from the Stars and later that of the rough beast slouching towards Bethlehem in his poem "The Second Coming".
- In She-Ra: Princess of Power, the titular character She-Ra rides an alicorn named Swift Wind since September 1985.
- In Jem, she and her boyfriend ride winged unicorns during the song "Like a Dream" November 1985 in Disaster
- In Sailor Moon SuperS, Helios, the Guardian Priest of Elysion and guardian of the Golden Crystal, takes the form of a pegasus with a golden horn and wings and hides from the Dead Moon Circus and Queen Nehelenia in Chibiusa's dreams, forming a bond with her. In the original manga, he is instead cursed and transformed into a pegasus.
- The PBS Kids series Arthur features one of DW's toys, a blue fluffy unicorn from the fictional company My Fluffy Unicorn who has white feathered wings and stars on her hips.
- The 2010 incarnation of the My Little Pony toyline and the television series My Little Pony: Friendship Is Magic features several winged unicorns (referred to as ‘alicorns’), including Princess Celestia and her younger sister Princess Luna, who formerly ruled Canterlot, Princess Cadance, the ruler of the Crystal Empire, and Cadance's daughter Flurry Heart. The series' protagonist Twilight Sparkle, is a Unicorn who becomes an Alicorn and the Princess of Friendship in the episode "Magical Mystery Cure". Formerly living in Ponyville, Twilight later lives in Canterlot after succeeding Celestia and Luna as the ruler of Equestria in the series finale.
- In the 2021 film My Little Pony: A New Generation, Sunny Starscout is originally an earth pony until the end, where she gains translucent wings and a horn. The 2021 soft reboot of the My Little Pony franchise, which A New Generation is a part of, further explores the idea, as the evil pony Opaline has tangible wings and a horn. Additionally, Friendship Is Magic winged unicorns return in Make Your Mark.
- In Sofia the First, winged unicorns reside on the Isle of Unicorns, one of the isles in the Mystic Isles, and in episode 29 of the fourth season "Forever Royal, Part 2", Sofia uses the Amulet of Avalor to transform into a winged unicorn.
- Luigi's Mansion (2001) has two pegacorn statues on the big balcony.
- Webkinz has two winged unicorns as pets: the Celestial Unicorn, which is purple and cyan, and the Quirky Carnival Unicorn, which is dark purple and mint green.
- The Skandar book series by A. F. Steadman feature winged unicorns that reside on an island between Britain and Ireland known simply as The Island. These unicorns hatch from eggs that appear in The Island's hatchery on the same day their destined riders are born, hatching when the riders turn thirteen. In order to find which of the Hatchery's eggs contains their destined unicorn, riders must place their right hand onto an egg. If the rider finds the correct egg, the unicorn inside will start to hatch from it and their horn will pierce their rider's palm, leaving a wound on it called a Hatchery wound. This procedure causes the unicorn to transfer some of its magic into their rider, allowing them to use magic connected to the elements of Fire, Earth, Air (or Wind), Water and Spirit. Afterwards, the unicorn and their rider train at a school on The Island called The Eyrie for five years, where they are taught how to perform elemental magic, with their assigned element being their strongest. Eyrie students in their fourth and fifth year, along with older riders, participate in the Chaos Cup, an event where twenty-five unicorns and their riders race while using elemental magic against their opponents. The winning rider earns the title of Commodore of Chaos, which involves them taking charge of The Island, holding onto the title for a year unless they continue to win future Chaos Cups. A bonded unicorn's life is connected to their rider, meaning that if the rider were to die, the unicorn would die as well; however, if the unicorn were to die first, their rider would survive. Unicorns that hatch and do not have a rider to bond with will become wild and ferocious. Wild unicorns are also immortal, but can be killed by those allied to the Spirit element, and have a decayed appearance. The series' protagonist, Skandar Smith, owns a unicorn called Scoundrel's Luck.
- The 2020 Disney and Pixar film Onward features winged unicorns who have beastly behavior.
- In episode 31 of the 2019 anime Star Twinkle PreCure, after the twelve Princess Star Color Pens are gathered and the twelve Star Princesses are revived, Fuwa, originally a baby fairy created by the Star Princesses, evolves into a winged unicorn with white fur, light pink wings, and a rainbow mane and tail just like Rainbow Dash.
- In the Keeper of the Lost Cities series by Shannon Messenger alicorns are a rare, winged, horned horse species, considered the rarest creatures in the elvin world. The series features four known alicorns: Silveny and Greyfell, who were initially the last of their kind, and their twins, Luna and Wynn.

== See also ==
- List of fictional horses
