= My Little Pony: Friendship Is Magic =

American-Canadian animated series

- Logo for the series' final three seasons
- Genre: Comedy; Fantasy; Adventure; Musical
- Based on: My Little Pony by Bonnie Zacherle & Hasbro
- Developed by: Lauren Faust
- Showrunners: Lauren Faust (seasons 1–2); Jayson Thiessen; Meghan McCarthy; Asaph Fipke
- Directed by: Jayson Thiessen (seasons 1–5); James Wootton (seasons 1–3); Jim Miller (seasons 4–5); Denny Lu (seasons 5–9); Tim Stuby (seasons 6–7); Mike Myhre (seasons 7–9)
- Voices of: Tara Strong; Ashleigh Ball; Andrea Libman; Tabitha St. Germain; Cathy Weseluck
- Theme music composer: Daniel Ingram
- Opening theme: "Friendship Is Magic" (performed by Rebecca Shoichet, Ashleigh Ball, Andrea Libman, Shannon Chan-Kent, and Kazumi Evans)
- Ending theme: "Friendship Is Magic" (instrumental)
- Composers: William Anderson; Daniel Ingram (seasons 3–6) (Note: Main composer for the episodes "Magical Mystery Cure" in season 3, "Pinkie Pride" in season 4, "Crusaders of the Lost Mark" in season 5, and "A Hearth's Warming Tail" in season 6); Kelly Davidson; Steffan Andrews (seasons 3–4) (Note: Main composer for the episodes "Magical Mystery Cure" in season 3 and "Pinkie Pride" in season 4)
- Countries of origin: Canada; United States
- Original language: English
- No. of seasons: 9
- No. of episodes: 221 (list of episodes)

Production
- Executive producers: List: Lauren Faust (season 1, "The Return of Harmony"); Beth Stevenson (season 1); Stephen Davis; Kirsten Newlands; Blair Peters (seasons 1–2); Chris Bartleman (seasons 1–3); Meghan McCarthy (seasons 3–5, 8–9); Jayson Thiessen (seasons 4–5); Sarah Wall (seasons 5–9); Asaph Fipke (seasons 6–7); Nicole Dubuc (seasons 8–9)
- Producers: List: Sarah Wall (seasons 1–4); Devon Cody (seasons 3–9); Josh Haber (seasons 8–9)
- Running time: 22 minutes
- Production companies: Allspark Animation (Note: Formerly Hasbro Studios until 2019); Studio B Productions (season 1, "The Return of Harmony"); DHX Studios Vancouver (seasons 2–9)

Original release
- Network: Discovery Family (Note: Known as The Hub/Hub Network from 2010 to 2014.) (United States); Treehouse TV (Canada)
- Release: October 10, 2010 – October 12, 2019

Related
- My Little Pony (1986–1987); My Little Pony Tales (1992); My Little Pony: Pony Life (2020–2021); My Little Pony: Make Your Mark (2022–2023); My Little Pony: Forever Friendship (2027–)

My Little Pony: Friendship Is Magic is an animated television series based on Hasbro's My Little Pony franchise and marking the start of its fourth incarnation. The series follows a studious pony named Twilight Sparkle (Tara Strong), her dragon assistant Spike (Cathy Weseluck), and her friends Applejack (Ashleigh Ball), Rarity (Tabitha St. Germain), Fluttershy (Andrea Libman), Rainbow Dash (Ball) and Pinkie Pie (Libman). The six ponies, collectively known as the "Mane Six", go on adventures and help others around Equestria, solving problems with their friendships.

Produced by Allspark Animation and animated by DHX Media Vancouver, (Note: Known as Studio B Productions until 2011.) the series aired on The Hub (now Discovery Family) in the United States from October 10, 2010, to October 12, 2019. Hasbro selected animator Lauren Faust to head the show. In challenge to the nature of My Little Pony and other girl-targeted properties, Faust employed deeper characterization and fantasy worldbuilding, creating a show that resembled how she played with her toys as a child. She left the series during its second season, with other staff taking over from her.

Friendship Is Magic became one of the highest-rated productions in The Hub's history and gave Hasbro new merchandising opportunities. Although the show is targeted primarily to young girls, it has also attracted a following of older viewers known as "bronies". A spin-off franchise, My Little Pony: Equestria Girls, was launched in 2013 and ran alongside the series for six years. A feature-length film adaptation based on the television series was released in October 2017 in the United States. A spin-off comedy series, My Little Pony: Pony Life, premiered in November 2020. A live-action adaptation on the franchise by Amazon MGM Studios and Hasbro Entertainment was announced in July 2025.

== Premise ==
In the kingdom of Equestria, its three subspecies of ponies (often described as "tribes" or "races")—earth ponies, pegasi, (Note: Plural form of "pegasus".) and unicorns—live harmoniously. Twilight Sparkle, a studious unicorn (later an alicorn), travels to Ponyville to learn about friendship at the urging of Equestria's ruler (and her mentor) Princess Celestia. Twilight and Spike, her dragon assistant, become close friends with five other ponies: Applejack, Rarity, Fluttershy, Rainbow Dash, and Pinkie Pie. The ponies discover that they represent different facets of friendship, with powerful magical artifacts known as Elements of Harmony. They go on adventures and help others in and around Equestria, solving both interpersonal issues between them, and defeat destructive threats to both Equestria and the wider world.

== Cast and characters ==
- Tara Strong as Twilight Sparkle, (Note: Rebecca Shoichet provides Twilight Sparkle's singing voice.) a studious and socially naïve unicorn (later an alicorn) who loves to read but initially has trouble making friends.
- Ashleigh Ball as:
  - Applejack, a diligent earth pony whose family owns a farm.
  - Rainbow Dash, an egotistical, sporty pegasus.
- Tabitha St. Germain as Rarity, (Note: Kazumi Evans provides Rarity's singing voice.) a glamorous unicorn who owns a boutique.
- Andrea Libman as:
  - Fluttershy, a timid pegasus who loves animals.
  - Pinkie Pie, (Note: Shannon Chan-Kent provides Pinkie Pie's singing voice for most songs.) an energetic earth pony who enjoys throwing parties.
- Cathy Weseluck as Spike, a small dragon who is Twilight's assistant.

== Production ==
=== Conception ===
Hasbro has produced several incarnations of the My Little Pony franchise, often called "generations" by the toy line's collectors. With many brands, including My Little Pony, the company uses a multi-generational plan. The 2007 Transformers film inspired Hasbro, since it helped to increase sales of the Transformers toy line; the company wanted to retool the My Little Pony franchise to appeal to the young-girl demographic. According to Margaret Loesch, CEO of The Hub, revisiting properties which had been successful was an important decision; it was somewhat influenced by the network's programming executives, several of whom were fans of the shows. According to Hasbro senior vice president Linda Steiner, the company "intended to have the show appeal to a larger demographic"; the network was trying to create shows that parents and children would watch together. Central themes Hasbro sought for the show included friendship and cooperation, determined from market research in how girls played with toys.

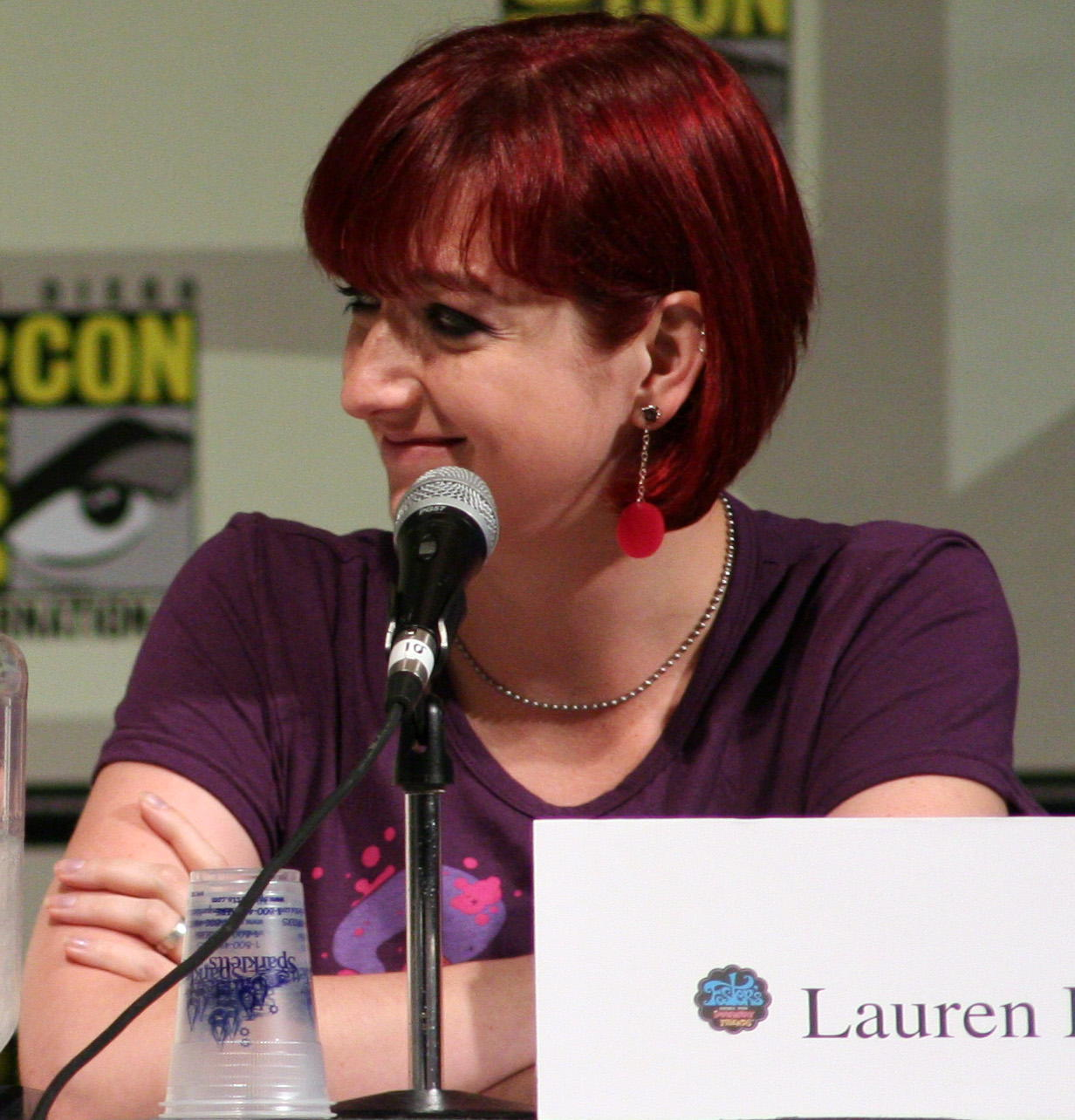
Lauren Faust, developer and initial showrunner of My Little Pony: Friendship Is Magic

Animator and writer Lauren Faust approached Hasbro to develop "Galaxy Girls", her girls'-toy property, into an animated series. Faust, who had worked on Cartoon Network's The Powerpuff Girls (1998–2005) and Foster's Home for Imaginary Friends (2004–2009), had unsuccessfully pitched animation aimed at girls for years. When Faust approached Lisa Licht of Hasbro Studios, Licht was uninterested but showed Faust the My Little Pony special Princess Promenade (2006). Licht thought that Faust's style was suitable for the brand and asked her to consider "some ideas [on] where to take a new version of the franchise".

Faust was initially hired by Hasbro to create a pitch bible for the show, enabling her to get additional help with ideas. She was "extremely skeptical" about taking the job, because she thought that shows based on girls' toys were dull. Although My Little Pony was one of her favorite childhood toys, Faust was disappointed by the television shows; the characters "just had endless tea parties, giggled over nothing and defeated villains by either sharing with them or crying". With the chance to work on My Little Pony, she hoped to prove that "cartoons for girls don't have to be a puddle of smooshy, cutesy-wootsy, goody-two-shoeness" like the original series. Faust incorporated many elements contradicting stereotypes of girls – diverse personalities, the message that friends can differ and remain friends, and the idea that girls should not be limited by what others say – into the design of the characters and the series. Elements of the characters' personalities and the show's settings were based on her childhood imagination of the ponies' adventures, inspired by shows such as The Transformers (1984–1987) and G.I. Joe (1983–1986) which her brothers watched. According to Faust, she was making Friendship Is Magic "for [herself] as an eight-year-old". Faust wanted the characters to be relatable, using "icons of girliness" (such as a waif or a bookworm) to broaden their appeal to a young female audience.

Using her childhood as a guide, she imagined the three types of ponies—unicorns, pegasi, and earth ponies—with different cultures and living in different places. Faust pictured the unicorns in the mountains, the pegasi in the clouds, and the earth ponies on the ground. She envisioned them as realistic horses who ate hay, lived in barns, pulled carts, wore saddles, and picked up objects with their mouths.

Faust said that Hasbro's positive response to non-traditional elements inspired her as she gave the company more ideas for the show. Although she pitched a balance of adventure and relationship stories, she de-emphasized adventures and focused on exchanges between characters for pragmatic reasons. The show incorporated creatures intended to frighten children, such as dragons and hydras, but emphasized friendships among the characters which were leavened with humor. When the series was approved, Faust had developed three scripts.

=== Development ===
Faust drew concept sketches, several of which appeared on her fyre-flye DeviantArt page. They included ideas about how she envisioned the original series' ponies—Applejack, the cowgirl; Firefly, the "badass"; the bubbly, enthusiastic Surprise; Posey, the kind, shy pony who loved other animals; and Sparkler, the fashion artist—which inspired this series' main cast. Hasbro approved the show with Faust as executive producer, and asked her to complete the pitch bible. She hired Martin Ansolabehere and Paul Rudish, with whom she had worked on other animated shows. Faust credited Rudish with inspiring Nightmare Moon, a villain who appears in the premiere episode "Friendship Is Magic", and the pegasus ponies' control of the weather; she then imagined the ponies as stewards of their world who made weather happen, flowers grow, and animals thrive. She also consulted her husband Craig McCracken, creator of The Powerpuff Girls and Foster's Home for Imaginary Friends. In six weeks, Faust sketched over 40 pages of "the universe that had existed in her 8-year-old mind".

The visual collaboration brought a unique style to Friendship Is Magic. Pennsylvania Dutch design, steampunk fantasy art, European fairy tales, and Bavarian folk art influenced the original pony world. Designing the settings, Faust sent photos to artist Dave Dunnet. Ponyville was based on German cottages, with a fairy-tale quality and equine elements such as horseshoe-shaped archways, hay bales, and troughs. Canterlot was based on castles and cathedrals, giving it a European feel; its location on a mountain and its purple-and-gold palette conveyed royalty and aspiration. Fantasy inspired elements of the series which were modified to suit its setting, story, and target audience. After seeing the initial version of the pitch bible, Hasbro requested more character designs and hired Dunnet and Lynne Naylor to refine the background and characters.

After the pitch bible was completed, Hasbro and Faust evaluated animation studios. Studio B Productions (renamed DHX Media Vancouver on September 8, 2010; "The Return of Harmony" is the last FIM work in which the studio is credited as Studio B) worked on Macromedia Flash-based animations and shows featuring animals. Faust felt that the studio would be a good fit, and agreed that Jayson Thiessen should direct the series. Faust, Thiessen, and James Wootton (who later became series co-director) presented a two-minute pitch to Hasbro, which approved the production. Faust estimated the time between being asked to develop the show and its approval at about one year. The foundation of the series took roughly two years.

=== Crew ===
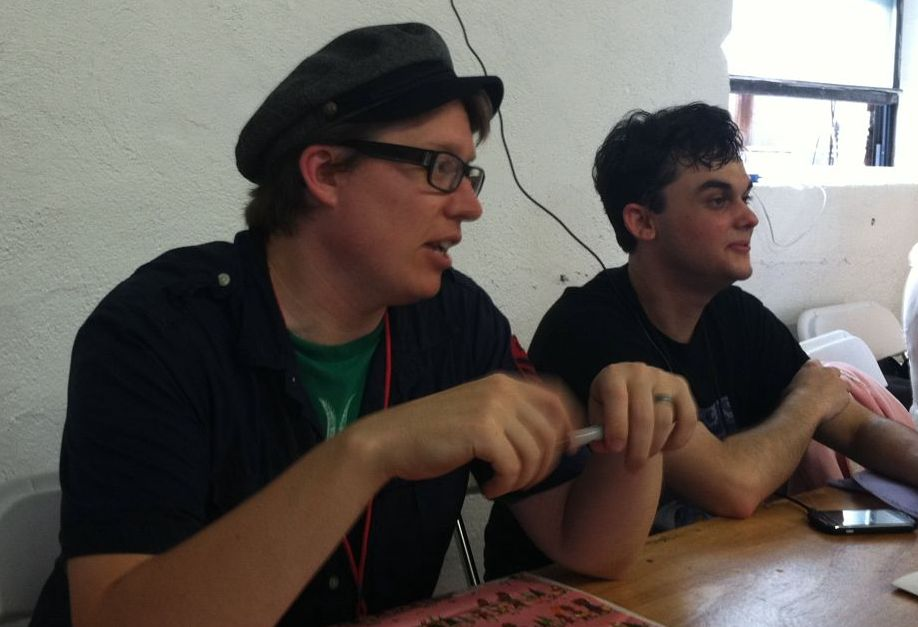
Jayson Thiessen (left), the series' supervising director

Faust's initial writing staff at Hasbro Studios included several with whom she had worked on other shows and were approved by Hasbro, such as Amy Keating Rogers, Cindy Morrow, Meghan McCarthy, Chris Savino, Charlotte Fullerton, M.A. Larson, and Dave Polsky. McCarthy accepted Faust's invitation due to her dedication. Composer William Anderson presented a blind audition to Hasbro for Friendship Is Magic; the company admired his incidental music, and selected him.

After the first season's finale aired, Faust announced that she had stepped down as executive producer to become consulting producer. Her involvement in the second season consisted primarily of story concepts and scripts, and she left after that season. In an interview with New York magazine, Faust said that her reasons for leaving were a combination of hectic production schedules and a lack of creative control. McCracken said that Faust's departure was due to it being a toy company-driven show, and there was "still some frustration" with being unable to bring some of her ideas to the screen.

Initially scheduled to work on its fifth season, McCarthy gave up most of her work on the series to write My Little Pony: The Movie (2017). After Thiessen also left to work on the film, his co-director Jim Miller became supervising director with animation director Denny Lu taking Miller's spot as co-director. During season 6, layout supervisor Tim Stuby was also appointed as co-director to assist Miller and Lu before leaving during season 7, leading to Mike Myhre taking his spot for the rest of the series.

=== Writing ===
Writing began with the premise and "getting a nugget of a story to build upon" at Hasbro. Faust and Rob Renzetti conceived broad plots for each episode, and held a brainstorming session with each episode's writer to flesh out scenes and dialogue. They worked with the writer to finalize the script and provide basic storyboard instructions. Hasbro was involved throughout the process, laying down concepts for incorporation into the show. Examples included Celestia as a princess instead of a queen; a fashion-focused pony; and toy sets in the story, such as Rarity's boutique. Hasbro sometimes asked for a setting, allowing Faust and her team to create its visual style and basing a toy set (such as the Ponyville schoolhouse) on it. As Faust adhered to the educational and informational standards which Hasbro required of the show, she found creating situations more difficult. For example, she comments that in the episode "Fall Weather Friends", having Rainbow Dash call Twilight Sparkle an "egghead" was "treading a very delicate line", and Applejack and Rainbow Dash accusing each other of cheating was "worrisome to some". When DHX Media went into the design phase of an episode, scripts were finalized. Each episode generally included a moral or life lesson, chosen to "cross a broad spectrum of personal experiences" and not just aimed at children. Because intellectual-property issues had caused Hasbro to lose some rights to the original pony names, the show included a mix of original characters from the toy line and new characters developed for the show.

Hasbro and Faust planned for episodes to be 11 minutes long before the series was approved, and Faust observed the limit in "The Ticket Master" (her first full-length script). Faust preferred 22-minute episodes, however, and Hasbro eventually agreed. Scripts were written around the episode runtime, and Miller said that most editing removed supplementary dialogue and action. Initial production stages were tight, requiring a schedule twice as fast as Faust had previously experienced. Communication between the Los Angeles writing offices and the animation studio in Vancouver was frequently remote. The two teams sometimes held "writer's summits" to propose ideas for characters and situations, at which the animation team provided suggestions on visuals, body language, and characterization. Larson said that his writing often used "ridiculous shorthand" for conciseness, and he referred to other works.

=== Music ===
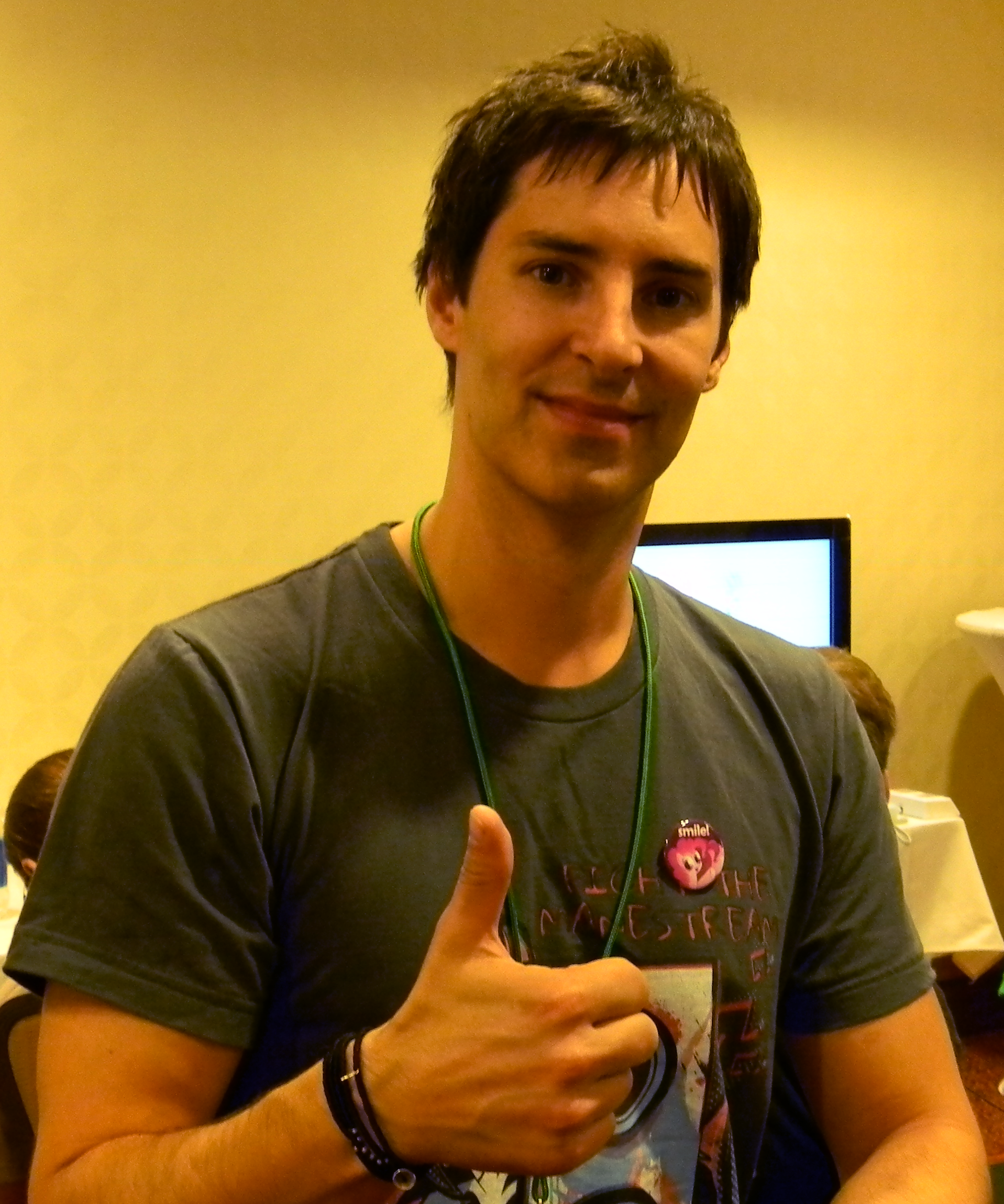
Daniel Ingram composed the series' songs.

The series' background music and songs were composed by William Kevin Anderson and Daniel Ingram, respectively. The production team identified parts of each episode where they wanted music cues, allowing Anderson to provide the music. The score was composed after each episode's initial animation, and was reviewed by Hasbro. Ingram worked with Anderson's compositions to create songs which meshed with the background music and fleshed out the show's fantasy setting. Ingram's songs usually began with a piano and a basic melody. The creative team received the song and provided input; background voices and instrumentation were then layered before the lead singer's vocals. Writers sometimes suggested lyrics and overall musical themes, including two songs written by Amy Keating Rogers. Music composition substantially preceded the broadcast of an episode; songs for the series' third season, which began airing in November 2012, were composed in 2011. Ingram thought the songs from previous My Little Pony shows were "a little bit dated", and decided to bring more-modern work to the Friendship Is Magic series. Changes included songs with more emotional depth than those typical of children's animation, which could also be enjoyed outside the episode. Ingram said that his songs had become "bigger and more epic, more Broadway and more cinematic over time", and Hasbro endorsed the effort to try "something groundbreaking for daytime television". "Putting it Together" from the musical Sunday in the Park with George inspired "The Art of the Dress" in the first season episode "Suited for Success", and "At The Gala" from the first season finale was based on Into the Woods. A musical number in "The Super Speedy Cider Squeezy 6000" paid homage to "Ya Got Trouble" from The Music Man.

=== Casting and voice acting ===
Voice casting and production was handled in Vancouver by Voicebox Productions, with Terry Klassen the series' voice director. Faust, Thiessen, and others participated in selecting voice actors, with Hasbro giving final approval. Tara Strong was cast as Twilight Sparkle after Faust, who had worked with her on The Powerpuff Girls, asked her to help pitch the show by voicing Twilight, Pinkie Pie and "Applejack [or] Rainbow Dash". After Faust heard Strong as Twilight, she knew she wanted her for the role. When Cathy Weseluck auditioned for Spike, she envisioned him as a baby with a high voice. The director later told her to "boy him up a bit", "chang[ing] everything".

Voice work was done after writing and before animation, with the animators providing direction. According to Andrea Libman (the voices of Fluttershy and Pinkie Pie), this approach enabled the actors to play the characters without limitations; Libman said that she was allowed be as exaggerated as she wanted without the animators stopping her. The actors received songs before recording, and practiced them at home. The songs were recorded with the dialogue.

=== Storyboarding and animation ===
Completed scripts were sent to Studio B for pre-production and animation with Macromedia Flash Professional 8. Thiessen's production team was allowed to select key personnel, subject to Hasbro approval; one of those selected was art director Ridd Sorensen. The Studio B team storyboarded the provided scripts, incorporating direction and creating scenes that the writers believed were impossible to animate. The DHX Media team went through the storyboard and design process, recorded dialogue, and created a storyboard animatic from the voice recordings. The animators then prepared key-character poses, layout, background art, and other major elements. These versions were sent back to the production team in Los Angeles for review by Hasbro with suggestions from the writers. Hasbro also received rough black-and-white drawings, colored and finalized character and prop designs, and animatics and a rough cut. Thiessen credited much of the technical expertise to Wooton, who created Flash programs to optimize the placement and posing of the pony characters and other elements; this simplified the work needed from other animators. The ponies' manes and tails are generally fixed shapes, animated by bending and stretching them in curves; this gave them movement without the need to animate individual hairs.

Sample storyboard from the two "Twilight's Kingdom" episodes, depicting an action sequence cited as difficult to storyboard.

According to Timothy Packford of DHX Media, storyboarding action scenes was difficult because the stories' important points might be lost; storyboarding and intent needed to be clear. Episodes with large amounts of dialogue could "sort of slog and grind because there's so much talking". A crucial point was to keep the shots interesting, with a good flow of one into another, and action sequences tended to have more cuts than dialogue. The storyboard artists and animators also added unscripted background characters to populate the world. According to McCarthy, many fandom acknowledgements, pop-culture references or other Easter eggs were added by the studio. Filipino animation studio Top Draw also worked on the animations.

Each of the main characters had distinctive expressions and mannerisms, and shared general ones. According to the DHX Media team, they "avoid[ed] certain expressions if it [went] outside [the ponies'] personality". The creative team interpreted each character's personality as mannerisms, facial expressions, props, and home environment; Twilight's purple color signified royalty and mystical awareness, and her hard, angular edges personified her as tidy. Other examples include Rainbow Dash's rainbow hair, representing her ability to cause a Sonic Rainboom; (Note: Combination of "rainbow" and "sonic boom".) Fluttershy's hair, indicating her bounciness, gentleness, and optimism; Applejack's cutie mark, (Note: A symbol that appears on the ponies' rumps once they have found their purpose or special talent in life.) symbolizing her simplicity; Pinkie Pie's shape (similar to a bubble, balloon, or cloud), reflecting her cheerfulness and buoyancy; and Spike's design, embodying his difference from the ponies.

The director and supervising director managed half of the episodes each, working together on two-part episodes, and the supervising director oversaw all episodes. Faust estimated the time to complete one episode at one year. The team simultaneously worked on various stages of all 26 first season episodes; when the second season was approved, that number rose temporarily to 32. Episodes were originally aired about one month after completion, with the timeframe becoming six to eight weeks by the sixth season. According to Thiessen, they had pushed to start work on the second season as soon as the first was completed to prevent staff turnover.

== Themes ==
=== Friendship ===
Female friendship is a central theme of the series. Faust said that its deeper message is that friendship means being oneself and accepting others. According to Ethan Lewis of Den of Geek, the show often "takes on very morally complicated situations [...] that don't seem to have easy answers as opposed to very cut and dried children's messages". Lewis added that the series taught lessons about friendship which some adults would be unable to comprehend. The A.V. Club's Emily St. James compared Friendship Is Magic to "an owner's manual to being a kind person". St. James said that making friends could be difficult for children; the series broke it down to its most basic aspects, demonstrating the importance of a few friendly gestures. Den of Geek writer Alana Joli Abott cited the celebration of differences, faith, and inclusion as prominent themes.

=== Fantasy ===
Megan Crouse described the series for Den of Geek as "'serious' fantasy", drawing comparisons to The Lord of the Rings and The Sword in the Stone. According to Crouse, Friendship Is Magic's consistency and system of magic made it work well as a fantasy story. The Cut's Lisa Miller said that the series could be compared to almost any children's fairy tale or fantasy story. Many commentators have noted the influence of anime, especially magical girl anime, on the series. This is evident in the character designs, transformation sequences, and visual homages. Faust said that mythology and the fantasy genre influenced all of Friendship Is Magic.

=== Feminism ===
Several writers have called the show's setting a matriarchy. In the OpenEdition.org journal Transatlantica, Isabelle Licari-Guillaume wrote that the series counters sexist portrayals which are common in media for children. Lewis considered the characters some of television's "best representations" of females, neither stereotypically feminine nor masculine. In the analysis Orienting Feminism, Kevin Fletcher wrote: "Friendship is Magic exhibits a feminist sensibility rather than an individualistic post-feminist one." Fletcher added that by focusing on the value of community, the series abstains from post-feminism. A study by Christian Valiente and Xeno Rasmusson which sampled 13 episodes found that the series has characters in circumstances which dispute gender stereotypes; females often play primary, active roles in positions of authority. Valiente and Rasmusson said that although some male characters have abilities and authority, the series focuses on females often shown in positions of strength and leadership while maintaining traditional feminine traits. According to Valiente and Rasmusson, gender is "[no]thing more than an aesthetic story element" in Friendship Is Magic.

== Episodes ==
Series overview
Season	Episodes	Originally released		
Season	Episodes	First released	Last released	Network
1	26	October 10, 2010	May 6, 2011	The Hub/Hub Network
2	26	September 17, 2011	April 21, 2012	The Hub/Hub Network
3	13	November 10, 2012	February 16, 2013	The Hub/Hub Network
4	26	November 23, 2013	May 10, 2014	The Hub/Hub Network
5	26	April 4, 2015	November 28, 2015	Discovery Family
6	26	March 26, 2016	October 22, 2016	Discovery Family
7	26	April 15, 2017	October 28, 2017	Discovery Family
Film		October 6, 2017		—N/a
8	26	March 24, 2018	October 13, 2018	Discovery Family
Holiday special		October 27, 2018		Discovery Family
9	26	April 6, 2019	October 12, 2019	Discovery Family
Special		June 29, 2019		Discovery Family
Clip shows	6	April 20, 2020	May 25, 2020	—N/a

== Distribution ==
=== Broadcast ===
My Little Pony: Friendship Is Magic, which is primarily targeted at girls aged 4–7, was one of several animated shows which aired on The Hub (a retooling of Discovery Kids owned by Discovery Communications). The network was rebranded Discovery Family on October 13, 2014. Each episode is about 22 minutes long.

Friendship Is Magic premiered on October 10, 2010. In March 2011, less than two months before the season finale aired, the series was renewed for a second season which aired from September 17, 2011, to April 21, 2012. A month before the second season ended, the series was renewed for a third season which premiered on November 10, 2012, and ended on February 16, 2013. One month later, The Hub renewed the show for a fourth season to air during the 2013–2014 television season. On May 7, 2014, the series was renewed for a fifth season. On August 4–8, 2014, The Hub aired "My Little Pony Mega Mare-a-thon": a 50-hour marathon of every episode from the first four seasons of My Little Pony: Friendship Is Magic and specials from the toy line's third generation. The fifth season premiered on April 4, 2015, and ended on November 28, 2015. A month before the prior season's airing, Discovery Family renewed the series for a sixth season which was broadcast from March 26 to October 22, 2016. In October 2016, the show was renewed for a seventh season which aired from April 15 to October 28, 2017. An eighth season was broadcast from March 24 to October 6, 2018. Discovery Family announced the ninth and final season on March 8, 2019, which premiered on April 6 of that year. Before its finale, My Little Pony: Friendship Is Magic — A Decade of Pony (a behind-the-scenes look at the making of the series) was aired on October 11, 2019. The 90-minute finale was broadcast the following day.

=== Home media and streaming services ===
In 2011, Celebration at Canterlot (a two-episode DVD) was available at Target stores with toys from the franchise.

With several other Hasbro properties, Friendship Is Magic was added to Netflix on April 1, 2012, in the United States. In 2015, the series and several other shows based on Hasbro properties were planned to be dropped from the streaming service. However, Hasbro and Netflix later decided to keep the shows on the latter. Friendship Is Magic was intended to be removed in August 2018; a few seasons were dropped before they were brought back. Most of the series was removed from Netflix worldwide on January 31, 2022, and the show was fully taken off of Netflix in the United States on April 1, 2025. In addition to other Hasbro shows, seasons 3-9 of Friendship Is Magic are currently available for streaming in the United States on FAST streaming service Tubi, owned by Fox Corporation.

Shout! Factory has the DVD rights for the series in Region 1. Twenty-three five-episode DVDs and three six-episode DVDs have been released. The series' first seven seasons have been released in DVD box sets. United Kingdom-based Clear Vision has the publishing rights in Region 2 (which includes most of Western Europe and the Middle East), but the company entered administration in December 2013. Madman Entertainment has the Region 4 DVD and digital-download rights.

== Reception ==
=== Critical reception ===
Friendship Is Magic received acclaim for its animation style, stories, characterization, and exploration of feminism. Rotten Tomatoes reports that 100 percent of 10 critics gave the show's first season a positive review, with an average score of 8/10. According to the website's critical consensus, "Smart and sweet, My Little Pony: Friendship is Magic's [sic] proves that children's entertainment can be fun for adults, too."

Critics responded positively to the series' characters, messages, and morals. A review by Emily Ashby on Common Sense Media, an organization focusing on the parenting aspect of children's media, emphasized the show's themes of loyalty, friendliness, friendship, tolerance, and respect. Den of Geek's Anna Dobbie appreciated the ponies' different personalities (which she believed worked well to achieve stability) and the series' focus on self-discovery and acceptance; According to Screen Rant writer Carly Olsen, the show develops both its major and minor characters well. Jamie Spain similarly applauded the show's elements of growth, learning, and social skills on BuzzFeed, which she considered uncommon in children's television. The characters, messages, and morals have been called "super cool", relatable, "absolutely genuine", inspiring, positive, and enjoyable. Kathleen Richter of Ms., however, disagreed with the praise; she wrote that Friendship Is Magic promoted sexism, racism, and heteronormativity, saying that Rainbow Dash's character encouraged the stereotype that "all feminists are angry, tomboyish lesbians" and criticizing other aspects. Faust responded to these claims, stating that although Rainbow Dash is a tomboy, her sexual orientation is never identified; Richter's assumption that all tomboys are lesbians is "extremely unfair to both straight and lesbian tomboys".

The series' visual designs and references have also been praised. St. James found the show "blessed with great looking characters and brightly colored backgrounds", and IndieWire's Liza Shannon Miller and Hanh Hguyen and Entertainment Weekly's Hillary Busis credited its style and homages as contributing factors to the show's position as a pop-culture phenomenon. Lewis agreed, highlighting the series' "vintage" style and "geek references". For Wired, Matt Morgan wrote that the Easter eggs deepened the viewing experience. Ashby and Amid Amidi (writing for Cartoon Brew) expressed concerns with the show's embedded marketing. Ashby warned parents to be wary of the effect Friendship Is Magic could have on their children's wants; Amidi believed that assigning a talent like Faust to a toy-centered show was part of a trend focusing on profitable animation genres (such as toy tie-ins) to deal with a fragmented viewing audience, "an admission of defeat for the entire movement [of creator-driven animation]", and a "white flag-waving moment for the TV animation industry".

Friendship Is Magic was included on a number of best-of lists. TV Guide (top sixty), IndieWire (forty-fifth), and Rotten Tomatoes (sixty-fourth) listed it as one of the top animated series of all time, and readers of Television Without Pity voted it the best animated show on television. IndieWire ranked it the twentieth-best animated series of the 21st century. Other rankings are Time Out's list of best kids' shows (twenty-fourth) and Paste's list of best Netflix children's shows (eighth).

=== Ratings ===
Friendship Is Magic premiered with an average viewership of 1.4 million per month, increasing to 4 million per month by the end of its first season (the highest-rated Hasbro show at the time). Advertising Age reported that the series' audience doubled between its first and second seasons. According to Vox, its peak years were 2012 to 2014. In March 2013, The Hub reported that the series had triple- and quadruple-digit-percent year-to-year growth. In September of that year, it was the second most-watched show on The Hub for girls ages 2–11 and women ages 18–49. A month later, Friendship Is Magic was one of the most co-viewed television series and the best-performing show on The Hub (with Littlest Pet Shop). In the first quarter of 2014, the show had an American viewership of over 12 million. Ratings began to decline after that year.

=== Awards and nominations ===
Awards and nominations
Year	Award	Category	Nominee(s)	Result	Ref.
2012	Daytime Emmy Awards	Outstanding Original Song – Children's and Animation	Daniel Ingram (for "Becoming Popular (The Pony Everypony Should Know)")	Nominated	
2012	Daytime Emmy Awards	Outstanding Original Song – Children's and Animation	Daniel Ingram (for "Find a Pet Song")	Nominated	
2012	Leo Awards	Best Animation Program or Series	Sarah Wall, Chris Bartleman, Blair Peters, and Kirsten Newlands	Nominated	
2012	Leo Awards	Best Direction in an Animation Program or Series	Jayson Thiessen and James Wootton (for "Party of One")	Nominated	
2012	Leo Awards	Best Overall Sound in an Animation Program or Series	Marcel Duperreault, Todd Araki, Jason Fredrickson, and Adam McGhie (for "Read It and Weep)	Nominated	
2013	Leo Awards	Best Musical Score in an Animation Program or Series	Daniel Ingram and Steffan Andrews (for "Magical Mystery Cure")	Won	
2013	Leo Awards	Best Overall Sound in an Animation Program or Series	Marcel Duperreault, Todd Araki, Jason Frederickson, and Adam McGhie (for "Sleepless in Ponyville")	Nominated	
2014	Leo Awards	Best Musical Score in an Animation Program or Series	Daniel Ingram and Steffan Andrews (for "Pinkie Pride")	Nominated	
2014	Leo Awards	Best Overall Sound in an Animation Program or Series	Marcel Duperreault, Todd Araki, Jason Frederickson, and Adam McGhie (for "Power Ponies")	Won	
2016	Daytime Emmy Awards	Outstanding Original Song	Daniel Ingram and Amy Keating Rogers (for "The Magic Inside")	Nominated	
2016	Hugo Awards	Best Dramatic Presentation, Short Form	"The Cutie Map" (directed by Jayson Thiessen and Jim Miller; written by Scott Sonneborn, M.A. Larson, and Meghan McCarthy)	Nominated	
2016	Leo Awards	Best Musical Score in an Animation Program or Series	Daniel Ingram (for "Crusaders of the Lost Mark")	Won	
2016	Leo Awards	Best Sound in an Animation Program or Series	Marcel Duperreault, Todd Araki, Jason Fredrickson, Kirk Furniss, Adam McGhie, Christine Church, and Roger Monk (for "Do Princesses Dream of Magic Sheep?")	Won	
2016	Leo Awards	Best Performance in an Animation Program or Series	Ashleigh Ball (for "Tanks for the Memories")	Nominated	
2016	Young Artist Awards	Best Performance in a Voice-Over Role – Young Actor (12–21)	Graham Verchere	Won	
2017	Leo Awards	Best Musical Score in an Animation Program or Series	Daniel Ingram (for "A Hearth's Warming Tail")	Nominated	
2017	Leo Awards	Best Sound in an Animation Program or Series	Todd Araki, Christine Church, Marcel Duperreault, Jason Frederickson, Adam McGhie, and Roger Monk (for "28 Pranks Later")	Won	
2017	UBCP/ACTRA Awards	Best Voice	Andrea Libman (for "Rock Solid Friendship" as Pinkie Pie)	Nominated	
2017	UBCP/ACTRA Awards	Best Voice	Nicole Oliver (for "A Royal Problem" as Princess Celestia / Daybreaker)	Nominated	
2017	UBCP/ACTRA Awards	Best Voice	Vincent Tong (for "Hard to Say Anything" as Feather Bangs)	Nominated	
2018	Leo Awards	Best Sound in an Animation Program or Series	Marcel Duperreault, Todd Araki, Jason Frederickson, Adam McGhie, Christine Church, Kirk Furniss, and Roger Monk (for "Shadow Play – Part 2")	Nominated	
2018	Leo Awards	Best Voice Performance in an Animation Program or Series	Vincent Tong (for "Hard to Say Anything")	Nominated	
2018	UBCP/ACTRA Awards	Best Voice	Vincent Tong (for "Marks and Recreation" as Rumble)	Nominated	
2019	Humanitas Prize	Children's Teleplay	Brian Hohlfeld (for "Surf and/or Turf")	Nominated	
2019	Leo Awards	Best Voice Performance in an Animation Program or Series	Ashleigh Ball (for "Non-Compete Clause")	Nominated	
2019	UBCP/ACTRA Awards	Best Voice	Sunni Westbrook (for "Frenemies")	Nominated	
2020	UBCP/ACTRA Awards	Best Voice Performance	Sunni Westbrook (for "The Ending of the End – Part 1" as Cozy Glow)	Nominated	
2020	Leo Awards	Best Voice Performance in an Animation Program or Series	Sunni Westbrook (for "Frenemies")	Nominated	

=== Fandom ===
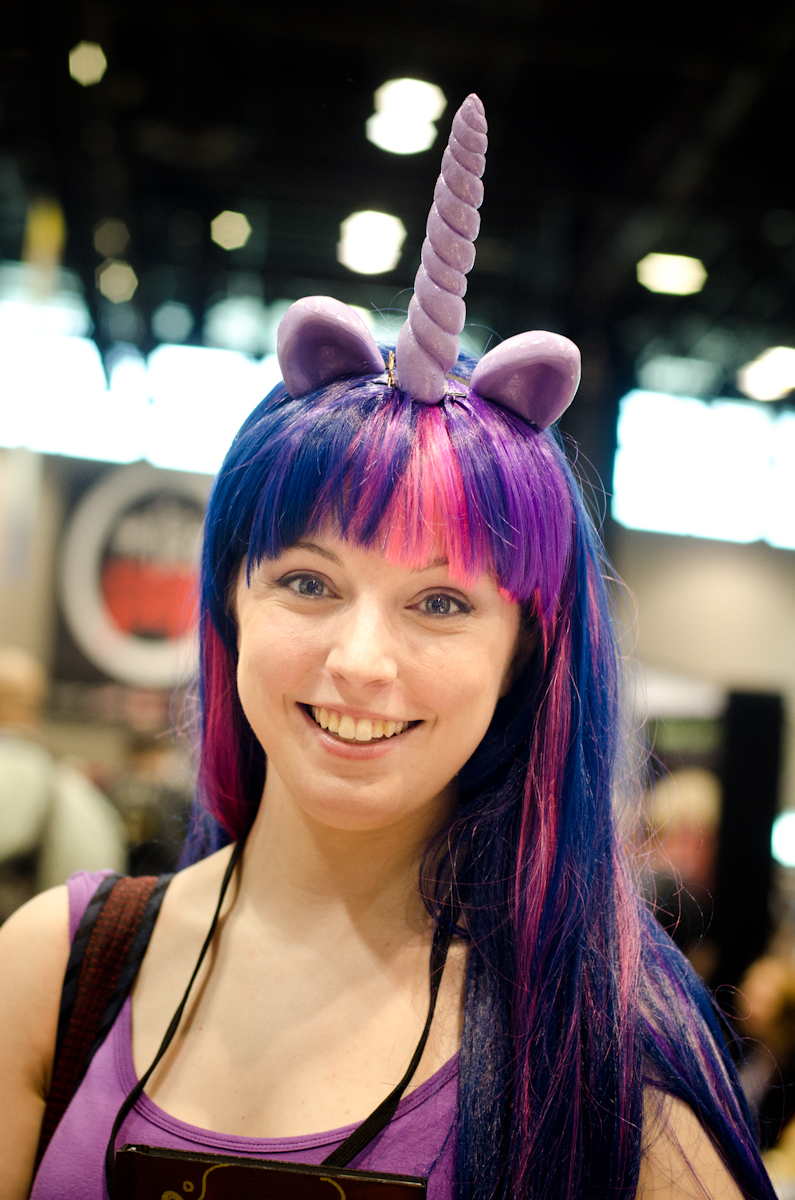
Twilight Sparkle cosplay

Despite Hasbro's target demographic of young girls and their parents, My Little Pony: Friendship Is Magic became a cultural and Internet phenomenon with male fans between the ages of 13 and 35 during the 2010s. The Internet response has been traced to cartoon and animation fans on 4chan responding to Amidi's essay on the show and current animation trends. As a result of the 4chan discussion, interest in the show spread throughout the Internet and inspired a fan base, creative works, fan sites, and fan conventions. Male fans adopted the name "brony" (a portmanteau of "bro" and "pony") to describe themselves. The term "pegasister" (a portmanteau of "pegasus" and "sister") was later adopted to refer to older female fans of the show. The older fan base surprised Hasbro and staff members involved with the series, who appreciated the fandom by adding acknowledgements to fans in the show and toys. Bronies were a meme early in the series, but their relative Internet popularity has gradually decreased over the years.

After the original television series ended in 2019, fans continued to host brony conventions around the world, create fan music, write fan fiction, and produce fan art.

== Other media ==
Friendship Is Magic is associated with the 2010 relaunch of the My Little Pony toy line of figurines and play sets. Due in part to older fans, Hasbro saw My Little Pony as a "lifestyle" brand with over 200 licenses in 15 categories of products which included clothing, housewares, and digital media. The brand grossed over US$650 million in retail sales in 2013, and US$1 billion in 2014 and 2016.

The series gave Hasbro several opportunities for spin-offs and other works. The company released games such as My Little Pony: Twilight Sparkle, Teacher for a Day, a video game by Gameloft, and a collectible card game. In 2012, IDW Publishing began releasing monthly My Little Pony: Friendship Is Magic comics; the series ended in September 2021. The comics were replaced by My Little Pony: Generations the following month. A crossover comic of Friendship Is Magic and Transformers was released in 2020 and 2021. Hasbro observed from the brony fandom that some fan-produced art was a humanized version of the show's characters, and was inspired to develop the My Little Pony: Equestria Girls spin-off series of movies and shorts, which ran with Friendship Is Magic for six years. My Little Pony: The Movie was released on October 6, 2017, in the United States. Hasbro and Discovery Family announced a subsequent animated series, My Little Pony: Pony Life. The series, based on the same characters (with most of the voice actors returning), has a new animation style and depicts more stories about mundane experiences.

=== Fifth generation ===
After the show's finale aired, Hasbro began working on a fifth generation which began with the feature film My Little Pony: A New Generation. Like Friendship Is Magic, it is set in Equestria because the production team wanted to further explore the fourth generation's lore and world-building. The fifth generation is set in after the events of the fourth, focusing on different ponies and unexplored parts of Equestria; this gave Hasbro the opportunity to include Easter eggs of the previous generations. The film was released on Netflix in September 2021 to positive reviews; it was followed by a television series which released on the streaming service in 2022.

== See also ==
- List of fictional horses
