= Filli Vanilli =

- My Little Pony: Friendship Is Magic episode
- The Pony Tones perform (left) while Fluttershy sings in the backstage (right)
- Episode no.: Season 4 Episode 14
- Directed by: Jayson Thiessen; Jim Miller (co-director)
- Written by: Amy Keating Rogers
- Original air date: February 15, 2014
- Running time: 22 minutes

Guest appearances
- Danny Balkwill as Toe-Tapper; Cathy Weseluck as Torch Song; Jerrica Santos as Torch Song (singing voice); Alvin Sanders as Flutterguy; Marcus Mosley as Flutterguy (singing voice)

Episode chronology
← Previous "Simple Ways"	Next → "Twilight Time"
- My Little Pony: Friendship Is Magic (season 4)

"Filli Vanilli" is the fourteenth episode of the fourth season of animated television series My Little Pony: Friendship Is Magic, as well as the seventy-ninth overall. Written by Amy Keating Rogers, directed by Jayson Thiessen, and co-directed by Jim Miller, the episode centers around Fluttershy having to deal with stage fright after being enlisted to perform as part of a live performance for charity. Aired on February 15, 2014, on The Hub, the episode was viewed by 584,000 people.

== Plot ==
External videos
- Filli Vanilli (full episode) — Official upload of the episode onto YouTube

Fluttershy sings her animals a beautiful song in the morning. Hearing this, her friends suggest that she should perform with the Pony Tones vocal quartet at a benefit concert. She refuses this due to her stage fright, even though she is a big fan of the Pony Tones. The next morning, the group comes together for a rehearsal. However, Big McIntosh, a member of the group who is supposed to sing bass at the concert, lost his voice during a turkey call competition. Now, with a member less, the group has to find a replacement for him.

Fluttershy decides to consult shaman and herbalist Zecora. Zecora says that she can cure Big Mac, but not in time for the concert. However, she reminds Fluttershy of her Poison Joke effect that deepened Fluttershy's voice, turning it into masculine "Flutterguy", and says that she can recreate it. Fluttershy is still nervous about singing on-stage, but Rarity suggests a solution: Fluttershy sings backstage, and Big Mac lip-syncs to her performance.

The concert goes perfectly, and requests for more performances keep pouring in. Fluttershy insists on continuing to sing for Big Mac out of sight as she enjoys being able to sing. After Big Mac recovers his voice, Rarity informs her that she is no longer required to sing. Seeing her disappointment, they allow her to perform one last time. During the song, Fluttershy accidentally knocks the curtain down, which reveals her. Even though the audience cheers for her, Fluttershy runs off in embarrassment.

Her friends find her at her cottage and convince her that facing her worst fear was not as bad as she had imagined because the audience loved her performance. Fluttershy agrees to perform privately for her friends with the Pony Tones and agrees to permanently join the band once she fully overcomes her stage fright.

== Production ==
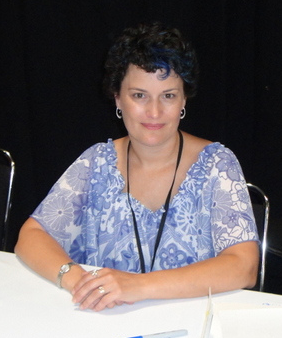
The episode was written by Amy Keating Rogers

Amy Keating Rogers, the episode's writer, said that she pitched the idea for the episode back in September 2012. She added that initial name of the episode was "The Return of Flutterguy", which was changed to "Flutterfear" because the previous title gave "too much information." The title was later changed to "Filli Vanilli", a reference to the German-French R&B duo Milli Vanilli, who were caught in a scandal that exposed them lip-syncing their performances.

=== Featured songs ===
Both songs featured in the episode were composed by the series songwriter, Daniel Ingram. The orchestration of "Music in the Treetops" was done by Trevor Hoffmann. "Find the Music in You" was orchestrated and arranged by Hoffman and Caleb Chan.

1. Music in the Treetops
2. Find the Music in You

== Broadcast and reception ==
On February 14, 2014, a day before the episode aired, Entertainment Weekly released a preview of the episode showing Fluttershy singing. The episode aired the following day on The Hub. According to the Nielsen household ratings, the episode was watched by approximately 0.3 percent of American households and had 584,000 viewers.

Reviews of the episode were mixed. Sherilyn Connelly, the author of Ponyville Confidential, panned the episode, giving it a "D-" rating. Sofie Liv of The Agony Booth gave the episode a rating of 3 out of 5 and called it "slightly above average" for the show, praising it as well told and well written with funny jokes and good musical numbers. She noted that while it was a very enjoyable watch, it was not really anything new since they had done this kind of episode with Fluttershy overcoming her fears before. Daniel Alvarez of Unleash the Fanboy gave the episode 4.5 out of 5 stars. He praised the writing and said that "the message of stage fright/fear in general was greatly handled." Alvarez further added that the episode "should and probably will go down as a classic", however he said that Pinkie Pie was annoying in the episode according to him. Raymond Gallant of Freakin' Awesome Network gave the episode a rating of 8 out of 10 and called it "a fun episode" with lots of great humor, praising the "got the music in you" song as "one of the show's catchiest so far." However, Gallant criticized Pinkie Pie's portrayal as too mean-spirited, noting it felt out of character compared to previous episodes where she was blunt but not hurtful.

In a critical analysis of the episode, author Jen A. Blue praised "Filli Vanilli" as "a pitch-perfect example" of the difference between helping and saving and wrote that the episode demonstrates what genuine support looks like by allowing Fluttershy to set the pace for dealing with her stage fright. Blue analyzed how the other ponies, particularly Rarity and Big Mac, offer resources and opportunities without asserting control and treat Fluttershy as a friend rather than a project in need of supervision. Blue contrasted this with Pinkie Pie's behavior, remarking that while Pinkie is trying to help, she fails because she cannot grasp the key principle that "often the hardest part of helping someone is doing nothing, standing by quietly while someone you care about struggles, because they do not need or do not want the particular kind of help you're able to give." Blue concluded that the episode succeeds by showing the Mane Six accepting that Fluttershy can reject their offered opportunities, which respects her autonomy and allows her to work through her issues on her own terms.

Andrea Libman, who voiced Pinkie Pie and Fluttershy, won the 2014 UBCP/ACTRA Award in the "Best Voice" category for her work in this episode.

== Home media ==
The episode is part of the complete Region 1 Season 4 DVD Set by Shout! Factory, which was made available in stores on December 2, 2014. Under the title "Flutterfear", it was also a part of the "My Little Pony: Maud Pie" DVD, released on January 8, 2018.
