= Luna Eclipsed =

- My Little Pony: Friendship Is Magic episode
- Princess Luna makes a dramatic entrance.
- Episode no.: Season 2 Episode 4
- Directed by: Jayson Thiessen; James Wootton
- Written by: M.A. Larson
- Original air date: October 22, 2011
- Running time: 22 minutes

Episode chronology
← Previous "Lesson Zero"	Next → "Sisterhooves Social"
- My Little Pony: Friendship Is Magic season 2

"Luna Eclipsed" is the fourth episode of the second season of the animated television series My Little Pony: Friendship Is Magic. The episode was written by M.A. Larson. It originally aired on The Hub on October 22, 2011. In this episode, Princess Luna visits Ponyville during the festival of Nightmare Night, but her outdated mannerisms and the ponies' fear cause problems.

== Plot ==
External videos
- Luna Eclipsed (full episode) — Official upload of the episode onto YouTube

Twilight Sparkle, dressed up as the legendary magician Star Swirl the Bearded, and Spike join Ponyville's Nightmare Night festival and encounter trick-or-treaters. When they arrive at the festival, Pinkie Pie appears in a chicken costume and leads a group of young ponies, including Pipsqueak, a young colt who recently moved to Ponyville from Trottingham, to various activities throughout the town. Mayor Mare announces the commencement of the festival and invites the foals to follow her and Zecora to a statue of Nightmare Moon for a storytelling session, where Zecora explains the tradition of wearing disguises and offering candy to prevent Nightmare Moon from finding and eating the ponies. A flying chariot carrying a hooded figure appears dramatically in the sky with gathering clouds and wind, scaring away everyone except Twilight.

The chariot reveals Princess Luna, who announces her desire to transform the "dreadful" Nightmare Night into a celebration of admiration for her, but Pinkie misinterprets this as a threat to feast on everyone and flees with the foals. Recognizing that Luna is having difficulty adjusting after her thousand-year exile, Twilight approaches Luna and suggests that her loud royal voice (the "Royal Canterlot Voice") may be causing miscommunication with the frightened ponies. Twilight brings Luna to Fluttershy's cottage to learn softer speech patterns, but when Pinkie and the foals witness this encounter, they assume Luna is about to eat Fluttershy and run away in terror.

Following Applejack's advice about playing games and having fun, Luna participates in carnival activities and begins to enjoy herself while asking ponies to call her "Luna" instead of "Princess Luna". She helps Pipsqueak at the apple-bobbing station, but Pinkie again spreads rumors that she is eating him. The frightened reactions of the townspeople cause Luna to lose her temper and loudly decree that Nightmare Night is canceled forever.

Twilight discovers that Pinkie actually enjoys being scared because it is fun, so she devises a plan where Luna disguises herself as Nightmare Moon to frighten the children. Luna succeeds in this, and as she begins to doubt the validity of Twilight's plan, Pipsqueak asks her if she can return next year to scare them again; the foals actually enjoy the frightening aspect of the celebration. Delighted, Luna reinstates Nightmare Night and joins the townspeople in various games and practical jokes throughout the rest of the evening.

== Reception ==
Sherilyn Connelly, the author of Ponyville Confidential, gave the episode a "B" rating. In her review of the episode in SF Weekly, Connelly wrote that the episode's lesson was "similar to the one from Zecora's first episode ["Bridle Gossip"]—don't judge a book by its cover, if somepony seems scary, be friendly to them anyway, and you might be surprised." She noted that while Zecora proved to be not scary at all, "the key to Luna becoming accepted was for her to own her scariness," calling it "a darned fine message."

In a critical analysis of the episode, author Jen A. Blue praised director Jayson Thiessen's animation techniques, particularly his skill with crowd scenes that create "the impression of a bustling, lively evening" through strategic use of multiple planes of motion and active background characters. Blue analyzed Luna's character as representing "every kid who's ever started a new school" and "every newly minted fan who's ever been derisively called a 'newbie,'" and argued that her struggles stem from being "lost in time" after missing a thousand years of social evolution during her exile. She interpreted the episode's approach to conflict resolution as particularly effective, writing that unlike many fish-out-of-water comedies, it "doesn't put all the burden of change on one side" and instead acknowledges that "most conflict between people requires some change on both sides." Blue also examined Twilight's role as having evolved from newcomer to "forum diplomat," suggesting the episode demonstrates how "true transformation" is "a process, bit by bit, tiny incremental changes" rather than an instantaneous cure-all.

Brendan Kachel of flayrah wrote that the episode was one of his favorites, as well as a favorite of the brony fandom. He praised Luna's character development from "evil supervillain in the series opener to extroverted but socially awkward geek" and noted that her transformation into Nightmare Moon made sense because "she was always a socially awkward geek who just wanted to make friends, but took a bad turn when she wasn't able to."

Anime Superhero News called "Luna Eclipsed" "the best episode of season two yet," praising its character depth, "genuine emotion, high attention to both the big picture as well as the little details, and a great sense of humor including well done running gags." Despite noting a personal disinterest in holiday-themed episodes, the reviewer wrote that the episode was "amazing" and recommended it to anyone with interest in the series.

A rerview from Republibot described the episode's plot as "a bit of a mess," suggesting the writers "started with 'sometimes it's fun to be scared,' and then tried to craft a friendship lesson around that." However, the reviewer noted that since "MLP isn't a plot-driven show," the episode was still enjoyable, particularly praising Luna's return with her "ethereal hair" and "voice immodulation" as well as the impressive amount of artwork and animation work required for the Halloween-themed setting.

Raymond Gallant of Freakin' Awesome Network gave the episode a rating of 6.5 out of 10 and called it "a major mixed bag," praising Luna's characterization as "adorable" and Tabitha St. Germain's voice work while criticizing the absence of Rarity, the pacing, and the new character Pipsqueak. Despite this, Gallant wrote that it was "a solid episode overall" that successfully established Luna's character.

== Home media release ==
The episode was part of the Season 2 DVD set, released by Shout Factory on May 14, 2013.

== See also ==
- List of My Little Pony: Friendship Is Magic episodes
