= The Association of Private Museums of Russia =

Russian non-profit museum organization

The Association of Private and People's Museums of Russia
- Founded: 2018
- Type: Non-profit
- Headquarters: Moscow, Russia
- Key people: Alexey Shaburov
- Website: privatemuseums.ru/en/

The Association of Private and People's Museums of Russia (before August 2021 — the Association of Private Museums of Russia) is a non-profit organization founded in 2018 that unites private museums of Russia and museum specialists on a voluntary basis. The Association represents the interests of the museum community before the executive authorities and offers a permanent platform for private museums for open dialogue and sharing experience.; The mission of the Association is to popularize Russian folk culture, preserve the cultural code and cultural heritage, promote museum pedagogy and cultural tourism.

== History ==
The cross-regional Association of Private Museums of Russia was officially registered in 2018.

In 2020, at the regular Congress of the museum community, the Charter of the Association was adopted and signed by 19 museums. The association includes more than 500 museums from 85 regions of Russia.

== Activity ==
The Association protects the collective interests and rights of its members. Main lines of action:

- creating of an information cluster that systematizes the information about cultural goods stored in private museums;
- improving the legal and regulatory framework for museum activities;
- organizing and holding professional exhibitions and conferences
- developing tourist infrastructures in the regions

As a result of the exhibition "Private Museums of Russia. Talents of Russia" held in Moscow in 2019 with the support of the Ministry of Culture of the Russian Federation, the first catalog of Private Museums of Russia was published in three languages (Russian, English, Chinese).

In 2020, after the museum lockdown, the Ministry of Culture of the Russian Federation, the Union of Museums of Russia, and the Association of Private Museums of Russia designed the 2021-2023 Development Program for Private Museums. The final document is advisory both for the Ministry of Culture and for local government.

In 2021, The Ministry of Culture, together with the Russian Union of Travel Industry and Tour Operators' Association of Russia, launched a new project "Museum Routes of Russia", in which the Association of Private Museums of Russia is directly involved.
