= May the Best Pet Win! =

- My Little Pony: Friendship Is Magic episode
- Fluttershy (left) and Rainbow Dash (right) sing the "Find A Pet Song", which was nominated for the 39th Daytime Emmy Awards.
- Episode no.: Season 2 Episode 7
- Directed by: Jayson Thiessen; James Wootton
- Written by: Charlotte Fullerton
- Original air date: November 19, 2011
- Running time: 22 minutes

Episode chronology
← Previous "The Cutie Pox"	Next → "The Mysterious Mare Do Well"
- My Little Pony: Friendship Is Magic season 2

"May the Best Pet Win!" is the seventh episode of the second season of the animated television series My Little Pony: Friendship Is Magic. The episode was written by Charlotte Fullerton. It originally aired on The Hub on November 19, 2011. In this episode, Rainbow Dash decides she wants a pet and, with Fluttershy's help, organizes a series of contests to choose the right animal companion.

== Plot ==
External videos
- May the Best Pet Win! (full episode) — Official upload of the episode onto YouTube

Rainbow Dash awakens from a dream about racing the other ponies' pets to find her friends arriving for their weekly pet playdate, which she learns they hold without her because she does not own a pet. When the sound of her friends playing with their animals keeps her awake, Rainbow mentions that not having a pet does not mean she never wants one, which prompts Fluttershy to bring her to the cottage to showcase various animals. Together they sing a song ("Find A Pet Song") where Rainbow decides to hold a contest to determine the best choice of pet. She selects several flying animals and a tortoise that Fluttershy insists should be allowed to compete, despite Rainbow's reluctance.

Rainbow conducts a series of competitions to test speed, agility, bravery, style, and various qualities she deems important like coolness and awesomeness. While the flying animals perform well in different areas, the tortoise proves unable to keep up in any of the contests and fails every challenge. As a result, Rainbow advises him to stop participating altogether. She narrows her choices down to an owl, bat, falcon, and eagle before unveiling the final challenge: a race through the dangerous Ghastly Gorge where whoever crosses the finish line with her will become her pet.

During the race through the treacherous gorge, the flying contestants manage to navigate the various obstacles and keep pace with Rainbow until she accidentally crashes into a wall and triggers an avalanche. The other animals rush past her to finish the race and fail to notice when a boulder pins Rainbow's wing to the ground, which leaves her trapped and panicked as her calls for help go unanswered. The tortoise, who had been left far behind, eventually reaches her and manages to use his head to lever the boulder off the ground and free her wing.

When Spike and the Mane Six see the flying contestants arrive at the finish line without Rainbow, they grow worried and spot the distant avalanche before the tortoise comes into view carrying Rainbow on his shell. Though the falcon technically won the race, Rainbow declares the tortoise as her new pet instead since the winning animal had to finish with her, and she names him Tank to reflect his steadfast loyalty. She writes to Princess Celestia about how the most important quality in a pet or friend is a never-give-up attitude rather than just physical ability, and Tank joins the weekly pet playdates using a magical propeller to fly alongside the group.

== Reception ==
The song "Find A Pet" sung by Rainbow Dash and Fluttershy was nominated for the 39th Daytime Emmy Awards.

Sherilyn Connelly, the author of Ponyville Confidential, gave the episode an "A-" rating. In her review of the episode in SF Weekly, Connelly wrote that Rainbow Dash learns the wrong lesson from the experience, arguing that Tank's most important quality was not his tenacity but rather his act of compassion in stopping to help Rainbow Dash when nobody else did, which she interpreted as an act of loyalty that connected to Rainbow Dash's Element of Harmony.

In a critical analysis of the episode, author Jen A. Blue interpreted the story as an allegory for disability, and described it as "one of the most subtle 'disabled people are just as deserving of friendship and respect' morals" she had ever seen. Blue argued that Rainbow Dash's initial rejection of Tank was based on his lack of speed and inability to fly, physical attributes she considered essential, effectively treating him as handicapped. She praised the episode's handling of the social construction of disability, noting that Tank's inability to fly only registers as a disability within Rainbow Dash's flight-centered lifestyle, while it would be normal in other contexts. Blue commended the episode for avoiding common pitfalls in disability representation by depicting Tank as competing on equal footing with other candidates despite his apparent disadvantage, which demonstrates that he has his own goals and employs strategies that play to his physical strengths. Blue argued that Tank ultimately wins not only because of his compassion in helping Rainbow Dash, but also because of his physical differences, as his sturdy build allows him to move the boulder that the lighter, flight-capable animals cannot. Blue wrote that this kickstarted Rainbow Dash's character arc, a byproduct of the show no longer having to focus on Twilight Sparkle (per the ending of "Lesson Zero").

Anime Superhero News called "May the Best Pet Win!" "a good episode of a great show" and praised Rainbow Dash's "perfect" portrayal and the episode's creativity in the competition events. However, the reviewer criticized the episode's predictability, noting that Rainbow Dash's choice was "obvious for most of the episode," and concluded that while entertaining, it was not one of the series' "classic and memorable episodes."

Raymond Gallant of Freakin' Awesome Network gave the episode a rating of 7.5 out of 10 and called it a solid episode that was cute and enjoyable. He praised the "Find A Pet" musical number as worth the wait and reaching Disney-level quality, and commended Tank as a great pet character with tons of personality. Gallant wrote that he enjoyed the pet competition segment, particularly the use of "Ride of the Valkyries" during the final contest. However, he criticized the episode's pacing and noted that Tank's victory was made too obvious too early, which killed the suspense. Despite this, Gallant wrote that the episode was a must-watch for newcomers to the show.

A review from Republibot described the episode as a nice reworking of the Tortoise and the Hare fable, though it noted that Rainbow Dash should lose points for missing loyalty in her pet criteria despite being the Element of Loyalty. The reviewer praised the musical number and commended various animation touches, particularly Tank's quick donning of sunglasses and his magical helicopter contraption.

== Home media release ==
The episode was part of the Season 2 DVD set, released by Shout Factory on May 14, 2013.

== See also ==
- List of My Little Pony: Friendship Is Magic episodes
