= Picasso's African Period =

Painting series by Pablo Picasso

Les Demoiselles d'Avignon. The two figures on the right are the beginnings of Picasso's African period.

Picasso's African Period, which lasted from 1906 to 1909, was the period when Pablo Picasso painted in a style which was strongly influenced by African sculpture, particularly traditional African masks and art of ancient Egypt, in addition to non-African influences including Iberian sculpture, and the art of Paul Cézanne and El Greco. This proto-Cubist period following Picasso's Blue Period and Rose Period has also been called the Negro Period, or Black Period. Picasso collected and drew inspiration from African art during this period, but also for many years after it.

== Context and period ==
In the early 20th century, African artworks were being brought to Paris as a consequence of the expansion of the French empire into Sub-Saharan Africa. The press was abuzz with exaggerated stories of cannibalism and exotic tales about the African kingdom of Dahomey. The mistreatment of Africans in the Belgian Congo was exposed in Joseph Conrad's popular book Heart of Darkness. It was perhaps due to this climate that Picasso and other artists began looking towards African art for inspiration. Picasso's interest in African art was sparked partly by Henri Matisse who showed him a wooden Kongo-Vili figurine.

In May or June 1907, Picasso experienced a "revelation" while viewing African art at the ethnographic museum at the Palais du Trocadéro. Picasso's discovery of African art influenced aspects of his painting Les Demoiselles d'Avignon (completed in July of that year), especially in the treatment of the faces of two figures on right side of the composition. Although many modern art curators have attempted to match individual African masks with the faces of these figures, the African masks used in these examples have not always been accurate, and the artist took ideas from multiple works.

Picasso continued to develop a style derived from African, Egyptian, and Iberian art during the years prior to the start of the analytic cubism phase of his painting in 1910. Other works of Picasso's African Period include the Bust of a Woman (1907, in the National Gallery, Prague); Mother and Child (Summer 1907, Musée Picasso, Paris); Nude with Raised Arms (1907, Thyssen-Bornemisza Museum, Madrid, Spain); and Three Women (Summer 1908, Hermitage Museum, St. Petersburg).

== Controversy ==
In historical reflection, a few issues have been pointed out including questioning the origins of this genre of art for Picasso. Primitivism as an aesthetic was often used by Europeans borrowing from non-Western cultures. While it is clear Picasso was inspired heavily by aesthetics from cultures not his own, many art historians and critics have argued that this sort of borrowing was a modernist expression.

Art historian Kobena Mercer covers Picasso's Demoiselles d'Avignon in his book on black diasporic art titled Travel and See. He argues Picasso's stylistic change towards an African inspired aesthetic was individualistic and modern while minority artists receive little to no recognition for their work inspired by their own culture.

It could also be seen as problematic that in Demoiselles d'Avignon the women painted wearing African-like masks are meant to be prostitutes from Barcelona's red-light district. Picasso masks these white bodies in order to make their sexualization acceptable to a European audience. Picasso himself though said about painting "It's not an aesthetic process; it's a form of magic that interposes itself between us and the hostile universe, a means of seizing power by imposing a form on our terrors as well as on our desires." To him, these masks were a people's connection between themselves and the hostile universe he wanted his art to confront.

In February 2006, an exhibition titled "Picasso and Africa" showcasing Picasso's work from his African period as well as many African sculptures similar to ones he would have been inspired by were shown side by side in Johannesburg, South Africa at the Standard Bank Gallery. A curator involved in the exhibition, Marylin Martin quoted to an article for the Guardian "Picasso never copied African art, which is why this show does not match a specific African work with a Picasso", the goal of the exhibition was not to accuse Picasso of stealing but to show how he transcended it and created a new aesthetic combining his own and his inspiration.

== Image gallery ==
Pablo Picasso, 1907, Nu à la serviette, oil on canvas, 116 x 89 cm

Pablo Picasso, 1907, Femme nue, oil on canvas, 92 x 43 cm, Museo delle Culture, Milano

Pablo Picasso, 1907, Nu aux bras levés (Nude)

Pablo Picasso, 1907, Head of a Sleeping Woman (Study for Nude with Drapery), oil on canvas, 61.4 x 47.6 cm, The Museum of Modern Art, New York

Pablo Picasso, 1907-08, Vase of Flowers, oil on canvas, 92.1 x 73 cm, Museum of Modern Art, New York

Pablo Picasso, 1908, Bols et flacons (Pitcher and Bowls), oil on canvas, 66 x 50.5 cm, Hermitage Museum, Saint Petersburg, Russia

Pablo Picasso, 1908, Dryad, oil on canvas, 185 x 108 cm, The State Hermitage Museum, St Petersburg

Pablo Picasso, 1908, Trois femmes (Three Women), oil on canvas, 200 x 185 cm, Hermitage Museum, Saint Petersburg

Pablo Picasso, 1908, Seated Woman (Meditation), oil on canvas, 150 x 99 cm, Hermitage Museum, Saint Petersburg

Pablo Picasso, 1908, Paysage aux deux figures (Landscape with Two Figures), oil on canvas, 60 x 73 cm, Musée Picasso, Paris

Pablo Picasso, 1909, Nature morte à la brioche

Pablo Picasso, 1909, Brick Factory at Tortosa (L'Usine, Horta de Ebro), oil on canvas, 50.7 x 60.2 cm, The State Hermitage Museum, Saint Petersburg

Pablo Picasso, 1909, Maisons à Horta (Houses on the Hill, Horta de Ebro), oil on canvas, 65 x 81 cm, private collection

Pablo Picasso, 1909, Harlequin (L'Arlequin)

Pablo Picasso, 1909, Buste de femme (Femme en vert, Femme assise), oil on canvas, 100.3 x 81.3 cm, Van Abbemuseum, Netherlands. This painting from the collection of Wilhelm Uhde was confiscated by the French state and sold at the Hôtel Drouot in 1921

Pablo Picasso, 1909, Head of a Woman (Tête de femme), oil on canvas, 60.3 x 51.1 cm, The Art Institute of Chicago

== See also ==
- List of Picasso artworks 1901–1910
