= Ngil mask =

Fang people mask from Central Africa

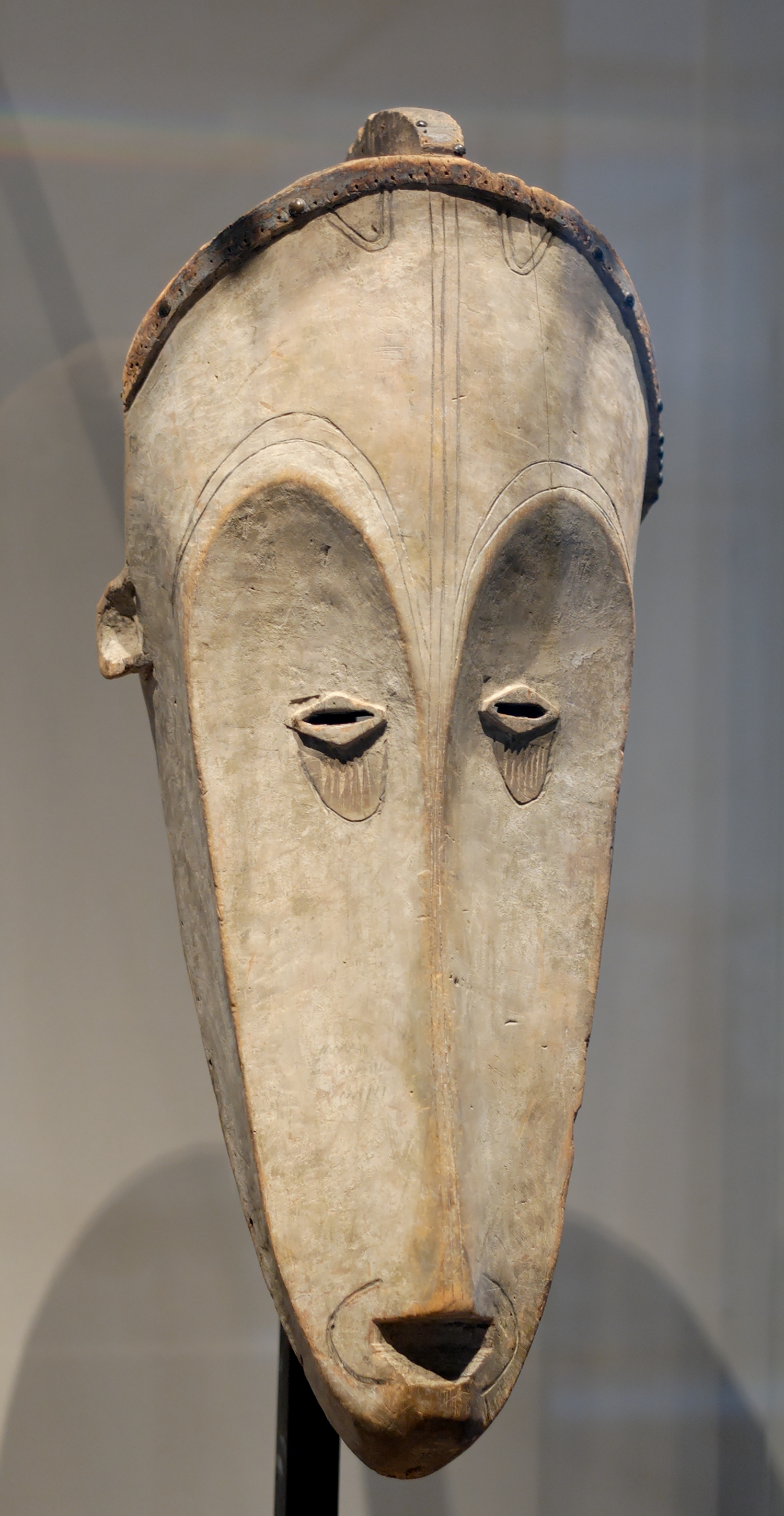
Ngil mask from the Fang people

The Ngil (ni - jil) mask originated from an agrarian/hunting group known as the Fang people, located in the countries of Gabon, Equatorial Guinea, and Cameroon.

== Ngil masks ==
These masks were worn during the initiation of new members into the group or while policing communities. They are crafted with wood, which is then covered with a layer of soft white clay that is called Kaolinite. Often strips of raffia, which are pieces of fiber from the raffia palm, are attached to the mask. The white color of these masks is associated with things like the spirits of ancestors, death, and male virility or manhood. Most Ngil masks are an oval shape featuring a broad forehead with an elongated chin and nose. One of the defining characteristics are high rounded brows and a smooth, long face which may have meant to reflect the Ngil Society's name, which means "gorilla". Depending on the mask, there are often strips of fiber or raffia attached to the chin or around the face.

== The Ngil ==
The Ngil were a secret male society within the Fang people tasked with protecting and administering justice, as well as keeping peace between clans and villages. The Ngil society took part in rituals and ceremonies that were intended to discourage people of the community that might have evil intentions and fight off witchcraft. This group and its traditions however, were outlawed in the late 1920s by French authorities.

== See also ==
- Fang People
- Fang Language
- Traditional African masks

== Bibliography ==
- "Ngil Mask." Denver Art Museum, https://www.denverartmuseum.org/en/object/1942.443. Accessed 6 Mar. 2023.
  - The Denver Art Museum is committed to the ethical collecting practices, and adheres to the collecting and acquisitions guidelines from the Association of Art Museum Directors (AAMD) and the American Alliance of Museums (AAM). They have a great staff and constantly update their website with new information.
- Cosgrove, Adrenike. “ÌMỌ̀ DÁRA.” ÌMỌ̀ DÁRA, ÌMỌ̀ DÁRA, 13 Feb. 2022, https://www.imodara.com/magazine/rediscovered-ngil/. Accessed 6 Mar. 2023
  - ÌMỌ̀ DÁRA is a website that connects collectors to the history of the objects of African art. They have a team of researchers to make sure their information is correct, this is a link for more information about them: https://www.imodara.com/about/
