= Look Before You Sleep =

- My Little Pony: Friendship Is Magic episode
- Applejack (center) is visibly disgruntled at receiving a makeover at Twilight Sparkle's (right) slumber party.
- Episode no.: Season 1 Episode 8
- Directed by: Jayson Thiessen; James Wootton
- Written by: Charlotte Fullerton
- Original air date: December 3, 2010
- Running time: 22 minutes

Episode chronology
← Previous "Dragonshy"	Next → "Bridle Gossip"
- My Little Pony: Friendship Is Magic season 1

"Look Before You Sleep" is the eighth episode of the first season of the animated television series My Little Pony: Friendship Is Magic. It originally aired on The Hub on December 3, 2010. The episode was written by Charlotte Fullerton. In this episode, Applejack and Rarity have a conflict over their different approaches to work while preparing for a thunderstorm, leading to an impromptu slumber party at Twilight Sparkle's library where they must learn to work together.

== Plot ==
External videos
- Look Before You Sleep (full episode) — Official upload of the episode onto YouTube

While working to prune trees in preparation for a rainstorm, Applejack and Rarity fall into a heated disagreement about each other's methods and approaches to the task. When rain begins to fall, they argue over suitable shelter until Twilight Sparkle invites them to stay in the Golden Oak Library for the duration of the storm. With Spike away on royal business, Twilight finds herself alone for the evening and sees the situation as a perfect opportunity to host her very first slumber party. Applejack and Rarity show little enthusiasm for spending an entire evening in each other's company but find themselves unable to leave due to the worsening weather conditions outside.

Following a book about sleepovers, Twilight initiates a series of slumber party activities for the group to enjoy together. They tell ghost stories, make s'mores, and play truth or dare, but Applejack and Rarity continue to bicker throughout the activities. The situation reaches a breaking point when a pillow fight escalates into a pillow war, with Twilight caught in the middle. Twilight suggests they call it a night and the three head to bed.

In the upstairs bedroom, Applejack and Rarity continue their feud by fighting over control of the bedsheets, which prompts an exasperated Twilight to chastise them for ruining her slumber party with their relentless arguing. Just then, lightning strikes a nearby tree and causes it to topple towards a neighboring house. Applejack attempts to use her lasso to stabilize the falling tree but accidentally pulls it through Twilight's bedroom window instead.

As the two ponies blame each other for the incident and Twilight desperately searches her slumber party book for guidance, Applejack realizes the need for cooperation to solve their problem. She apologizes to Rarity and accepts responsibility for the situation, which prompts Rarity to accept the apology and work together with her to clear the tree from the room. With their differences finally settled, the three friends conclude the evening with a peaceful game of Twenty Questions. Twilight officially declares the slumber party a success.

== Reception and analysis ==
Sherilyn Connelly, the author of Ponyville Confidential, gave the episode an "A+" rating and called it "the first truly great episode". She praised the uniqueness of the episode as a bottle episode, and wrote that the decision to do so was "fitting for a story which could be performed on stage"; "it’s also the talkiest episode to date, but every word counts as Rarity and Applejack verbally slash at each other like characters in a Eugene O'Neill play." In her review of the episode in SF Weekly, she wrote, "Twilight concludes that ponies with nothing in common (say, butches and femmes) can get along, if they embrace each other's differences. It's not a lesson that Twilight needed to learn, exactly, but she's the only one writing the letters—for now."

In a critical analysis of the episode, author Jen A. Blue examined "Look Before You Sleep" through the lens of kyriarchy and intersectionality, particularly around how the episode explores how gender intersects with other social identities. Blue interpreted the three main characters as representatives of different social groups: Rarity as someone with "conscious affectations of someone trying to rise above middle-class beginnings," Applejack as representing rural values despite her family's actual wealth and power, and Twilight as a member of the "pony intelligentsia." Blue wrote that Twilight's use of a slumber party rulebook was an attempt to unite the clashing characters through "common femininity", but criticized it as "declaring and enforcing a set of arbitrary rules that constrain femininity." When Applejack risks social status by asking Rarity for help, Blue understood this as showing how external forces can temporarily break down normative constraints and allows characters to work together as equals. Blue noted that the episode's ending hints at potential future conflicts when Rarity and Applejack compete over "who is more sorry," which Blue described as "possibly a ponified version of the so-called 'Oppression Olympics.'"

== Home media ==
The episode is part of the Season 1 DVD set, released by Shout Factory, on December 4, 2012.

== See also ==
- List of My Little Pony: Friendship Is Magic episodes
