= Ngoyo =

Former kingdom in west Central Africa

Kingdom of Ngoyo
- pre 13th century–1885
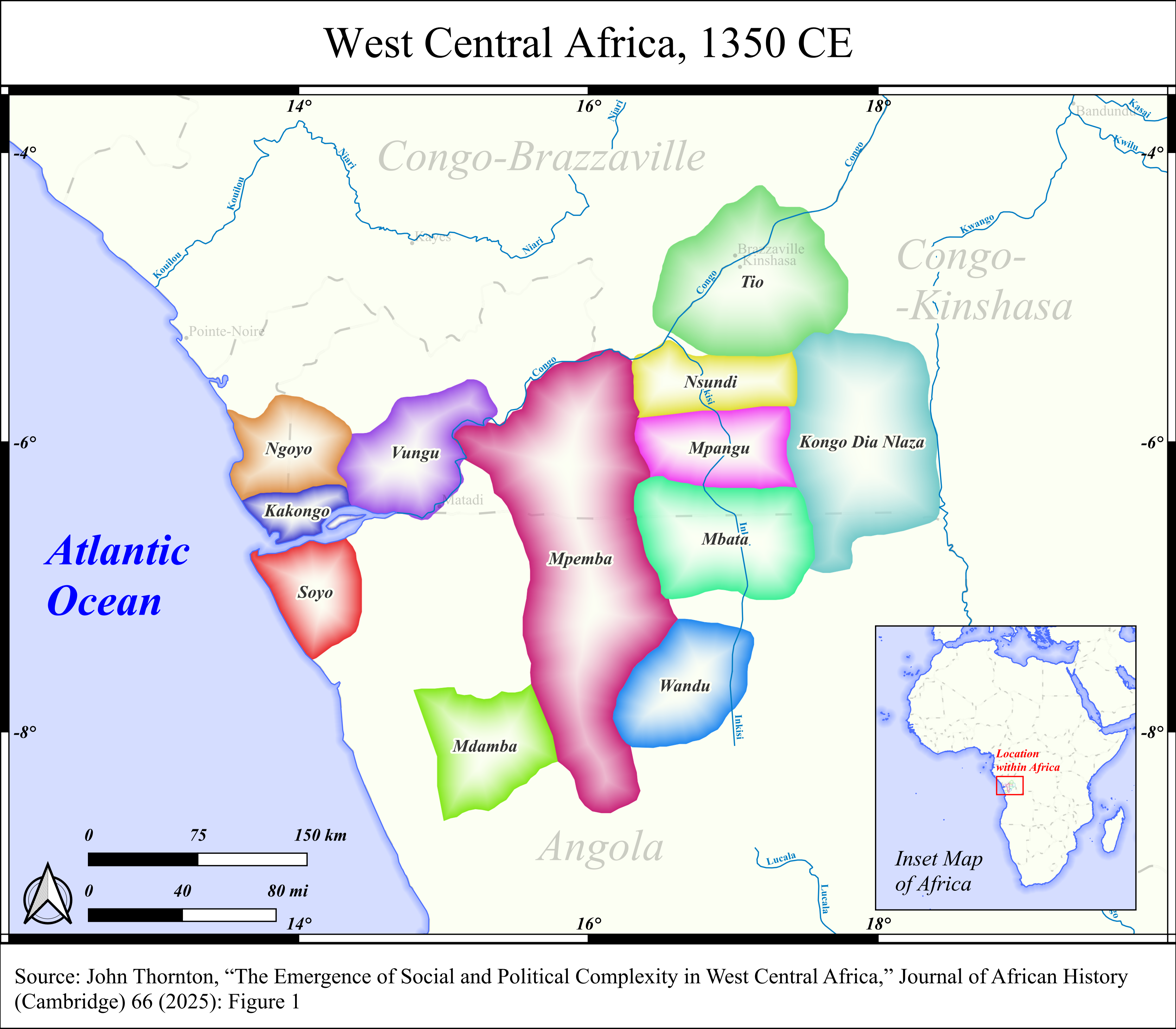
- States of the western Congo Basin, including Ngoyo, c. 1350
- Capital: Mbanza Ngoyo
- Common languages: Iwoyo (or Kiwoyo, Ciwoyo)
- Religion: Bakongo
- Government: Monarchy
- History
  - Established: pre 13th century
  - Treaty of Simulambuco: 1885
Succeeded by
Portuguese Congo

Ngoyo was a kingdom of the Woyo ethnic group, located in the south of Cabinda and on the Atlantic coast of Central Africa, just north of the Congo River. In the 13th century it formed part of a confederation led by Vungu. Ngoyo tradition held that the kingdom's ancestors were among the earliest settlers in the area, leading their chiefs to title themselves the nfumu nsi ("lords of the earth"). The capital was Mbanza Ngoyo.

In the 1630s Ngoyo was invaded by the forces of Soyo, and the son of the ruler of Soyo was installed as ruler of Ngoyo. It is not clear who the following rulers were for the next few decades.

In the 1680s Ngoyo had various relations with Soyo. It also had several English merchants present. When Antonio II Baretto da Silva invaded, the English forces tried to stop him and protect the interests of Ngoyo, but they were unsuccessful and Baretto da Silva imposed for peace terms.

By 1700, Cabinda had become the leading slave port north of Luanda, and Ngoyo's economy rested heavily on the sale of slaves.

In 1783, Ngoyo joined forces with the neighboring state of Kakongo to destroy a Portuguese fort. However, the kingdom was soon undone by the growing financial burden that the kingship entailed. With fewer and fewer possible claimants seeking the office, the kingdom effectively disintegrated in the 1830s after the nobles failed to elect a new king. In 1885, the Ngoyo signed the Treaty of Simulambuco with Portugal, and became a protectorate of that nation.

== See also ==
- Woyo masks
- Cimpaba
