= Bridle Gossip =

- My Little Pony: Friendship Is Magic episode
- The Mane Six, afflicted with various magical curses, then meet Zecora.
- Episode no.: Season 1 Episode 9
- Directed by: Jayson Thiessen; James Wootton
- Written by: Amy Keating Rogers
- Original air date: December 10, 2010
- Running time: 22 minutes

Guest appearance
- Blu Mankuma as "Flutterguy" (uncredited)

Episode chronology
← Previous "Look Before You Sleep"	Next → "Swarm of the Century"
- My Little Pony: Friendship Is Magic season 1

"Bridle Gossip" is the ninth episode of the first season of the animated television series My Little Pony: Friendship Is Magic. The episode was written by Amy Keating Rogers and directed by James Wootton. In this episode, the residents of Ponyville become fearful and suspicious when Zecora, a zebra from the Everfree Forest, arrives in town. When the main characters suffer from various magical afflictions after an encounter in the forest, they initially blame Zecora until learning the true cause and the dangers of prejudice and jumping to conclusions.

== Plot ==
External videos
- Bridle Gossip (full episode) — Official upload of the episode onto YouTube

When Zecora, a zebra, arrives in Ponyville to shop for supplies, the townspeople react with fear and suspicion due to her unfamiliar appearance and the fact that she lives in the mysterious Everfree Forest. The ponies quickly spread rumors that she practices "evil enchantments" and avoid her, despite her peaceful intentions. Apple Bloom, curious about the mysterious visitor, defies the warnings of her older sister Applejack and the other adults and follows Zecora into the Everfree Forest. The Mane Six go after Apple Bloom to bring her back safely. In the forest, while searching for Apple Bloom, the Mane Six accidentally come into contact with blue flowering plants. They eventually find Apple Bloom with Zecora, who speaks in rhyming couplets and appears to be brewing a potion. Frightened by her activities and strange speech pattern, they quickly retreat with Apple Bloom back to Ponyville.

The next morning, the Mane Six discover they have been afflicted with various magical curses:

- Applejack has shrunk to a tiny size, with a higher voice.
- Rainbow Dash's wings are now on her underside, and she has lost her ability to fly properly.
- Rarity's mane and fur have become wild and uncontrollable.
- Fluttershy has a deep, masculine voice (provided by Blu Mankuma).
- Pinkie Pie's tongue has swollen to an enormous size, impeding her speech.
- Twilight Sparkle's magic horn has become limp and floppy, and her spells backfire.

Convinced that Zecora has cursed them with "evil enchantments," the afflicted ponies and the rest of Ponyville become even more hostile toward the zebra. Despite the others' protests, Apple Bloom returns to the Everfree Forest to confront Zecora directly. The Mane Six follow her once again, and when they arrive at Zecora's hut, they discover that she is actually an expert in natural remedies and herbalism, not evil magic. Zecora explains that their afflictions were caused by the blue flowering plants they encountered in the forest called "poison joke". The plants cause different humorous but harmless effects on anypony who comes into contact with them. Zecora reveals that she had been preparing a remedy for Poison Joke when they first encountered her, having anticipated they might need it after seeing them in the forest. She provides them with a bath treatment that cures all their afflictions.

The Mane Six realize they had wrongly judged Zecora based on fear and prejudice rather than getting to know her as an individual. The episode concludes with the ponies apologizing to Zecora and welcoming her as a friend to Ponyville.

Dear Princess Celestia,

My friends and I all learned an important lesson this week. Never judge a book by its cover. Someone may look unusual, or funny, or scary. But you have to look past that and learn who they are inside. Real friends don't care what your "cover" is. It's the contents of a pony that count. And a good friend, like a good book, is something that will last forever.

Your faithful student,

— Twilight Sparkle, "Bridle Gossip"

== Controversy ==
Prior to the episode's airing, Ms. magazine intern Kathleen Richter published an article titled My Little Homophobic, Racist, Smart-Shaming Pony on December 9, 2010, one day before "Bridle Gossip" aired. According to Sherilyn Connelly writing in the book Ponyville Confidential, Richter criticized the series based on promotional materials and the show's website without having watched any episodes and raised concerns about the lack of Black pony characters among other issues. Series creator Lauren Faust responded to Richter's article on December 15, 2010, expressing disappointment that Ms. magazine "would post an article that is so clearly under researched and approached with wild pre-conceived notions and an extremely closed mind." Faust emphasized her work as a feminist to create positive entertainment for girls in an industry that "disrespects their intelligence, reinforces old fashioned and limiting expectations on them, and severely under-represents them."

After being contacted by a Ms. magazine editor who apologized for the article's lack of proper vetting, Faust published a 1,472-word rebuttal titled My Little NON-Homophobic, NON-Racist, NON-Smart-Shaming Pony: A Rebuttal in the same magazine on December 24, 2010. In her rebuttal, Faust outlined her mission to create entertainment that challenged the prevailing trend of "homogenized" female characters in girls' programming, arguing that "Girls like stories with real conflict; girls are smart enough to understand complex plots; girls aren't as easily frightened as everyone seems to think." She acknowledged the challenge of balancing personal ideals with commercial requirements, noting that she had "braced myself for criticism, expecting many people—without even watching the show—to instantly label it girly, stupid, cheap, for babies or an evil corporate commercial."

The controversy coincided with the emergence of the show's brony fandom. Shaun Scotellaro (also known as "Sethisto"), the founder of Equestria Daily, described the series as having "accidentally targeted Internet culture." Fans criticized Richter's analysis for not acknowledging Zecora's introduction in this episode. The first use of the term brony in the comments of Richter's article appeared on January 1, 2011, and discussions continued through February 2011. The incident marked one of the last major critiques focused solely on the show's content and impact on young girls before media attention shifted to the adult fanbase phenomenon.

== Reception ==
Connelly gave the episode a "C+" rating and criticized the episode's conclusion, using it as an example of "whiffed endings" in the series.

Academic scholars have analyzed Zecora's character and her debut episode as a commentary on racism, xenophobia, and prejudice. In her 2023 essay Jem, She-Ra, and My Little Pony, English professor and media scholar Melanie Hurley examined how the show uses Zecora to illustrate the problems with anti-Black racism. Hurley observed that Zecora is culturally coded as Black through signifiers like her accent, her golden neck rings, the African-inspired masks decorating her home, and the fact that she is a zebra. Hurley's analysis focused on how the majority of the Mane Six are depicted as reacting to Zecora based on irrational fear and prejudice, simply because she is different from them. Hurley concluded that the episode's resolution where the main characters realize how helpful and knowledgeable Zecora is, "unequivocally shows that fearing or hating someone because of their appearance, race, or other difference is illogical and causes problems for everyone involved." Alesha Davis, in a retrospective review for The Post, gave the episode a similar assessment and wrote that it "presents racism on purpose, serving as a lesson to the ponies not to judge others for being different from them." Jamie Kingston of WomenWriteAboutComics praised how the episode dealt with the theme of not judging others for visible differences.

In contrast, other scholars have been more critical of the episode's approach to racial representation. In a collection of essays on Friendship Is Magic, author Jen A. Blue described the episode as "racist" in its uncritical use of stereotypes, and described Zecora's overall portrayal as an example of the "noble savage" stereotype despite the episode's apparent good intentions. Blue argued that Zecora's speech patterns are related to a tradition of "black-coded cartoon characters who speak in rhyme" and noted that cultural elements from vastly different African cultures were combined to create the character, including a name that means 'zebra' in an East African language, Southern African neck rings, and West African masks. Blue contrasted this treatment with the show's careful distinction between European-derived pony cultures, arguing it demonstrated "simple, old-fashioned Eurocentrism" where African cultures were treated as a homogenous whole while European cultures were treated as distinct. Blue further argued that Zecora's characterization is an example of tokenism, where she becomes the sole representative of non-Western cultures in the show.

== Home media ==
The episode is part of the Season 1 DVD set, released by Shout Factory, on December 4, 2012.

== See also ==
- List of My Little Pony: Friendship Is Magic episodes
- "The Last Roundup"
