= The Cutie Pox =

- My Little Pony: Friendship Is Magic episode
- Apple Bloom (center) shows off her new cutie mark to her classmates.
- Episode no.: Season 2 Episode 6
- Directed by: Jayson Thiessen; James Wootton
- Written by: Amy Keating Rogers
- Original air date: November 12, 2011
- Running time: 22 minutes

Episode chronology
← Previous "Sisterhooves Social"	Next → "May the Best Pet Win!"
- My Little Pony: Friendship Is Magic season 2

"The Cutie Pox" is the sixth episode of the second season of the animated television series My Little Pony: Friendship Is Magic. The episode was written by Amy Keating Rogers. It originally aired on The Hub on November 12, 2011. In this episode, Apple Bloom becomes desperate to earn her cutie mark and takes a magical flower that causes her to develop the Cutie Pox, an ailment that forces her to uncontrollably perform various talents.

== Plot ==
External videos
- The Cutie Pox (full episode) — Official upload of the episode onto YouTube

After another failed attempt at earning her cutie mark at a bowling alley, Apple Bloom becomes discouraged, especially after witnessing another pony earning his mark in the alley. Dejected, she wanders into the Everfree Forest and accidentally injures her tooth. Zecora finds her and brings her back to her hut, where she restores the tooth with a potion. Apple Bloom asks Zecora if there is a potion that could help her get a cutie mark, but Zecora insists that only time can bring one. Zecora leaves to gather ingredients, but Apple Bloom remains in the hut and secretly uses a flower called Heart's Desire to brew a potion.

The next day, Apple Bloom appears at school with a new cutie mark and demonstrates a talent for hoop tricks. Her classmates are amazed, and her teacher Cheerilee asks her to give a lesson. As she performs, a second cutie mark appears, followed by another talent that she is suddenly able to do—spinning plates. Although Diamond Tiara suspects the marks are fake, Apple Bloom effortlessly performs both skills.

That night, Applejack hears noises and discovers Apple Bloom tap dancing uncontrollably. Apple Bloom now has a third cutie mark and cannot stop performing. Applejack takes her to Twilight Sparkle, who identifies the condition as the "Cutie Pox", a mysterious illness with no known cure. Twilight and Applejack take her to find Zecora, but on the way, Apple Bloom continues gaining cutie marks and talents. Zecora arrives in Ponyville and explains that she came to replace her missing Heart's Desire. She gives them enchanted seeds that will only bloom when someone tells the truth. Apple Bloom admits that she took the flower and used it to create a potion that gave her cutie marks. The seeds bloom instantly, and the resulting flower cures her.

Apple Bloom apologizes to Zecora and the others for stealing and lying. Zecora forgives her, and Twilight asks her to write a friendship report. Apple Bloom reflects on how taking shortcuts does not lead to genuine results, because what the heart truly desires must be earned. However, moments later, she joins Scootaloo and Sweetie Belle to visit Zecora again, hoping to earn a cutie mark in potion-making.

== Reception ==
Sherilyn Connelly, the author of Ponyville Confidential, gave the episode a "B" rating. In her review of the episode in SF Weekly, Connelly remarked that this episode's friendship lesson was the first without the Mane Six involved at all. She wrote that this episode was a strong end for the character arc where the Crusaders demand their cutie marks by any means necessary.

In a critical analysis of the episode, author Jen A. Blue described "The Cutie Pox" as "merely pretty good" and "a bit of a let-down", judging it a step down from the season's earlier high points and criticizing its second consecutive focus on the Cutie Mark Crusaders alongside what she called the "deeply problematic" tokenism of Zecora. Blue wrote that the plot hinged on Applejack and Twilight Sparkle making a "huge logical leap" in deciding to seek the zebra healer—an action rendered moot when Zecora arrived unprompted—and that the story left both the origin of the Cutie Pox and the workings of the Heart’s Desire plant unresolved. Blue interpreted Apple Bloom’s rapid succession of cutie marks as an allegory for a desire for social validation, linking it to cultural pressures on young adults to measure self-worth through socially sanctioned milestones. Ultimately, Blue suggested that the episode hinted at a subtler lesson for older viewers: Apple Bloom could begin to cultivate self-validation only once she recognized that her value did not depend solely on a cutie mark.

Jeff Lebowski (left) and Walter Sobchak (right) from The Big Lebowski, portrayed as ponies, dodge a bowling ball accidentally thrown by the Cutie Mark Crusaders. The character on the left later received speaking lines in the episode "Slice of Life".

Raymond Gallant of Freakin' Awesome Network gave the episode a rating of 6 out of 10 and called it his "least favorite episode this season." He praised Apple Bloom as a charismatic and hilarious character and enjoyed seeing Zecora despite noting that "her rhyming at times seems a bit stretched." Gallant wrote that he particularly appreciated the episode's pop culture references, especially what he described as "Big Lebowski Ponies," writing that the episode was "very heavy in references, more so than any episode I can recall in the past." However, he criticized the episode's pacing as too slow at times, particularly the hooping scene. Gallant also expressed frustration with the absence of Fluttershy for the second consecutive episode and complained that Big McIntosh was "reduced to a simple catchphrase speaker." He wrote that while the episode was decent, it "pales in comparison to some of the stronger episodes we've seen recently."

Anime Superhero News praised "The Cutie Pox" as "a great solid episode" and commended the character choice, writing that Apple Bloom was the perfect choice because she is "by far the most desperate of the group to get her Cutie Mark." The review highlighted the episode's character work and comedy, stating that "the show did a perfect job of having unique and well-played characters".

A review from Republibot praised the Cutie Mark Crusaders as well-developed characters, writing that they are "a rare instance of having supporting characters that are the target audience's age and who aren't completely annoying." The reviewer noted that it made sense for Apple Bloom, as the youngest of three siblings, to be the most obsessed with earning her cutie mark. While acknowledging the episode covered similar territory to the first season's "Call of the Cutie", the review stated it manages to stay fresh through the law of unintended consequences. The reviewer commended the show's writing and the quality of the animation, especially "the transition from the Apple family's house to Twilight's library" where Apple Bloom performs her newfound talents while "the background changes behind her," which "subtly indicates how incessant her compulsions are."

== Home media release ==
The episode was part of the Season 2 DVD set, released by Shout Factory on May 14, 2013.

== See also ==
- List of My Little Pony: Friendship Is Magic episodes
