= Zecora =

Fictional character from My Little Pony

- My Little Pony character
- Zecora as she appears in "The Cutie Pox"
- First appearance: "Bridle Gossip" (2010)
- Created by: Amy Keating Rogers; Lauren Faust
- Voiced by: Brenda Crichlow

In-universe information
- Species: Zebra
- Occupation: Herbalist; Potion maker; Shaman
- Affiliation: Everfree Forest

Zecora (/zɪˈkɔːrə/ zi-KOR-ə) is a fictional character who appears in the fourth incarnation of Hasbro's My Little Pony toyline and media franchise, beginning with My Little Pony: Friendship Is Magic (2010–2019). She is a recurring character throughout the series who serves as a wise mentor and ally to the Mane Six. She is voiced by Brenda Crichlow.

A mysterious and sagacious anthropomorphic zebra who lives alone in the Everfree Forest, Zecora is a skilled herbalist and potion maker who possesses extensive knowledge of magic, herbal medicine, and mysticism. She almost exclusively speaks in rhyming couplets, and is shown wearing tribal-inspired jewelry.

== Appearances ==
=== Fourth My Little Pony incarnation (2010–2021) ===
==== My Little Pony: Friendship Is Magic ====
Zecora first appears in the episode "Bridle Gossip", where she is depicted as a mysterious and potentially dangerous figure. When she ventures into Ponyville to gather supplies, the townsponies panic, fueled by old ponies' tales about "evil enchantresses." Twilight Sparkle and her friends venture into the Everfree Forest to confront her, where they discover that Zecora is actually kind and helpful. She helps cure the ponies after they are afflicted by "poison joke", a magical plant that causes humorous but harmless transformations.

Throughout the series, Zecora is a recurring mentor figure for various ponies, particularly the Cutie Mark Crusaders. Zecora appears in many episodes where she helps guide one character in Twilight and her friends for example in "Magic Duel" or even in "Bridle Gossip" where she warns the not to walk into poison joke.

== Development ==
Faust's sketch of Zecora, then named Shaman, for the 2008 MLP FiM pitch bible.

Her appearance and mannerisms are influenced by African tribal cultures. She speaks in an African-esque accent; show creator Lauren Faust has stated on her DeviantArt page that Zecora's accent is meant to resemble that of Swahili speakers. The show's staff did not have time or resources to have authentic Swahili, so they asked Crichlow, Zecora's voice actor, to improvise.

According to a September 2011 interview with Faust, Zecora was originally designed to have a more prominent role in the series as "a sage and mentor to whom the ponies could go for information about their quests." She was intended to serve as "a second mentor" to Twilight Sparkle complementing Princess Celestia's guidance. However, this expanded role failed to come to fruition in the first season due to the show's shift away from adventure-focused episodes toward more relationship-based storylines. Faust indicated that if the series had included more adventure episodes as originally planned, audiences would possibly have seen more of both Zecora and Princess Luna in Season 1.

Zecora shares the standard pony body type but features unique markings that distinguish her from other ponies.

== Reception and analysis ==
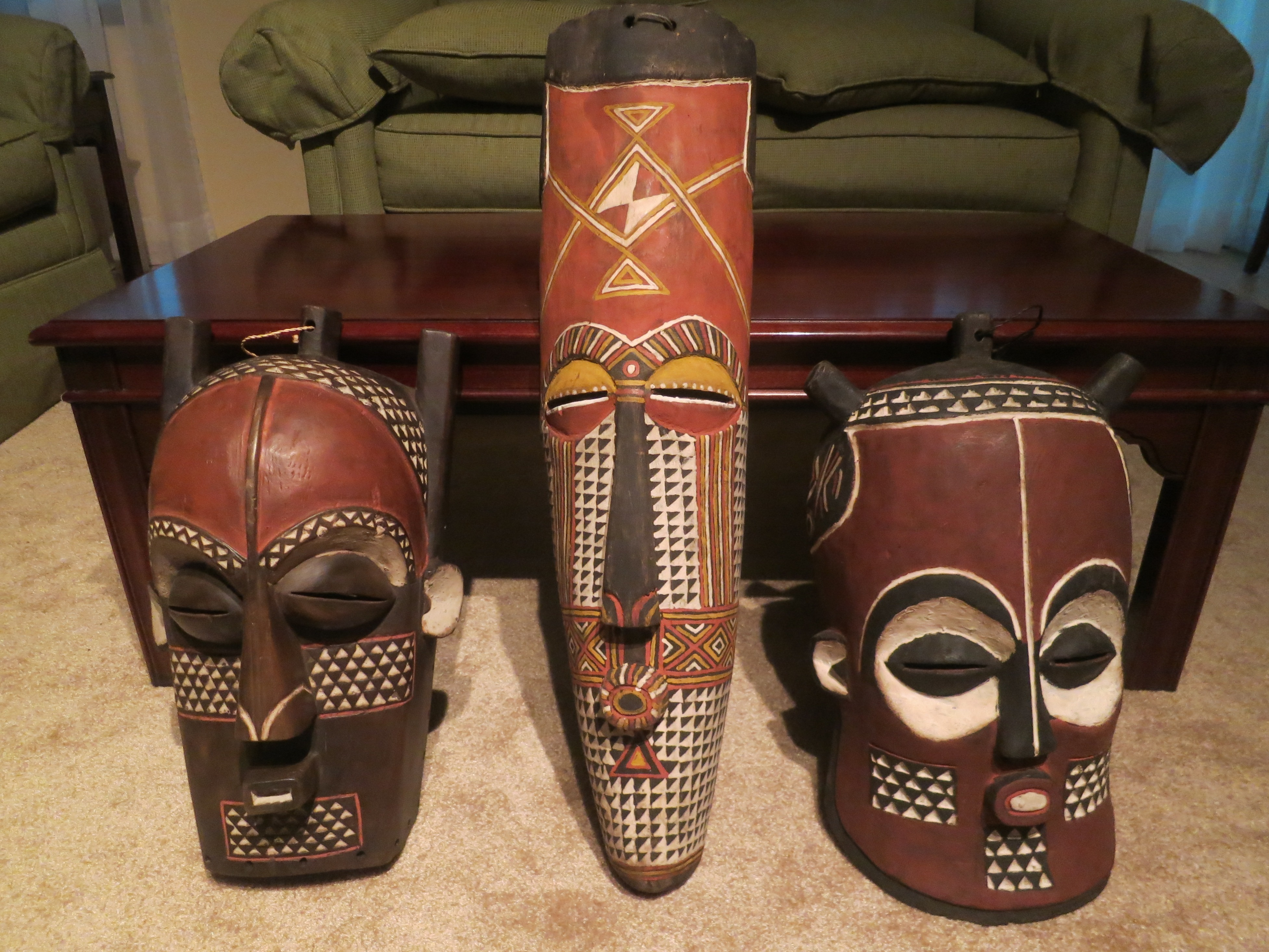
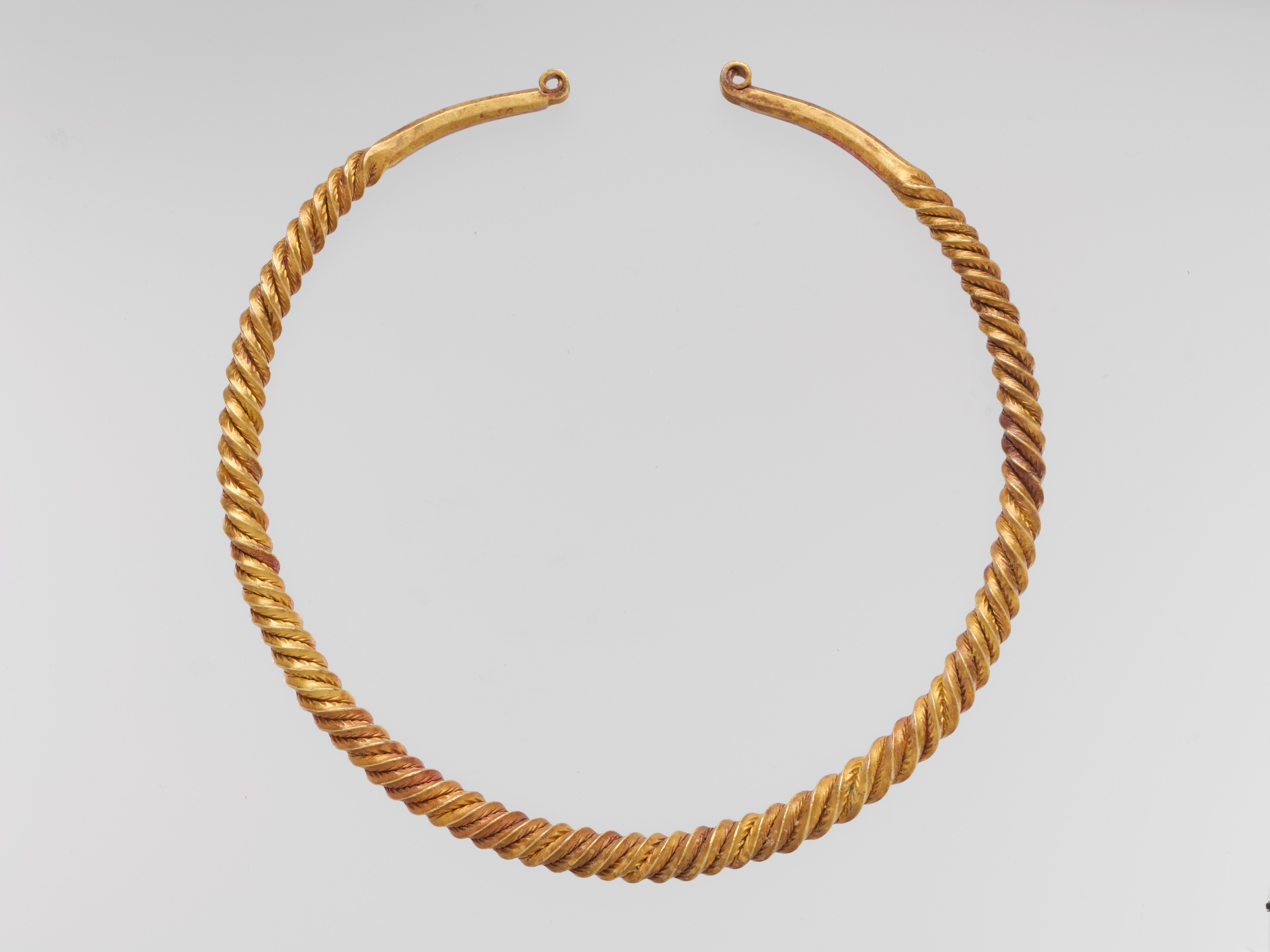
Critics noted that Zecora's character design combines cultural elements from vastly different African regions, such as her being named zebra in an East African language, wearing Southern African neck rings, and living in a hut decorated in West African masks far away from the other ponies.

Academic scholars have analyzed Zecora's character and her debut episode "Bridle Gossip" as a commentary on racism, xenophobia, and prejudice. English professor and media scholar Melanie Hurley wrote that the episode codes Zecora as Black through multiple visual and cultural signifiers: her species as a zebra, her accent, her golden neck rings, and the African-inspired masks that decorate her home. Hurley's analysis focused on how the episode depicts the Mane Six's initial reaction to Zecora: despite being unable to provide any evidence, all five of Twilight Sparkle's friends fear Zecora and tell Twilight that she is evil. According to Hurley, the ponies appear to fear Zecora simply because she is different from them. Hurley observed that even Twilight, who initially dismisses the concerns as "gossip and rumors," becomes caught up in their beliefs after the group is affected by poison joke. Hurley concluded that, by the episode's resolution—where the ponies discover that Zecora is actually helpful and knowledgeable rather than threatening—the show "unequivocally shows that fearing or hating someone because of their appearance, race, or other difference is illogical and causes problems for everyone involved." She argued that through its specific cultural coding, the episode "issues a particularly strong statement against anti-Black racism."

In contrast, other scholars have been more critical of the episode's racial representation. Author Jen A. Blue described the episode as "racist", though they clarified this was due to "lazily and uncritically repeating stereotypes, not active malice." Blue argued that Zecora's characterization suffers from problematic tokenism, where she becomes the sole representative of non-Western cultures in the show, meaning "any trait she possesses is possessed by all characters who signify black people." Furthermore, Blue criticized how Zecora combines cultural elements from vastly different African regions (being "named 'zebra' in an East African language, wearing Southern African neck rings, and with a hut decorated in West African masks"), creating what they called a "hodgepodge of cultural indicators." Blue contrasted this treatment with the show's careful distinction between European-derived pony cultures, arguing it demonstrated "simple, old-fashioned Eurocentrism" where "everything from the entire continent of Africa goes into a pot labeled 'African,' while more familiar European cultures are seen as distinct." She also criticized Zecora's speech patterns, noting her rhyming places her within "the long list of black-coded cartoon characters who speak in rhyme," and described her overall portrayal as falling into the "noble savage" stereotype despite the episode's apparent good intentions.

Alesha Davis, in a retrospective review for The Post, wrote that Zecora is the closest the show comes to racial representation for many of the earlier seasons of Friendship Is Magic.

Kleanthi Tselentis of the University of the Witwatersrand wrote that by marking Zecora with recognizable African cultural signifiers while leaving other pony characters unmarked, the show creates what she called a default racial identity for the main cast. She wrote that "through the constant representation of whiteness in entertainment, we assume the race to be a default unless proven otherwise," and suggested that Zecora's presence as a culturally marked "other" implies that the unmarked ponies represent whiteness. Tselentis commented that this character design choice complicates the series' stated intention of maintaining racially neutral identities, and contradicts creator Lauren Faust's previous statements that pony coat colors were not intended to be racial indicators.

Jamie Kingston of WomenWriteAboutComics criticized Zecora as a problematic "Magical Negro" trope. Kingston noted that Zecora's portrayal as a wise sorceress who can perform magic without being a unicorn reinforces the stereotype, and criticized her segregated living situation alone in the dangerous Everfree Forest, pointing out that "the only other pony-type creatures who don't live with pony-kind are the evil Changelings."

== See also ==
- List of My Little Pony: Friendship Is Magic characters
- Princess Luna
- Princess Celestia
- Twilight Sparkle
- Cutie Mark Crusaders
- Derpy Hooves

== Bibliography ==
- Begin, Mary Jane (2015). My Little Pony: The Art of Equestria. New York: Abrams. ISBN 978-1-4197-1577-8.
- Snider, Brandon T. (2013). The Elements of Harmony: My Little Pony: Friendship Is Magic: The Official Guidebook. New York: Little, Brown and Company. ISBN 978-0-316-24754-2.
