= Cimpaba =

Sword of the Woyo

A cimpaba (sometimes tshimphaaba or chimpaba) is a sword from the Woyo of the Democratic Republic of Congo.

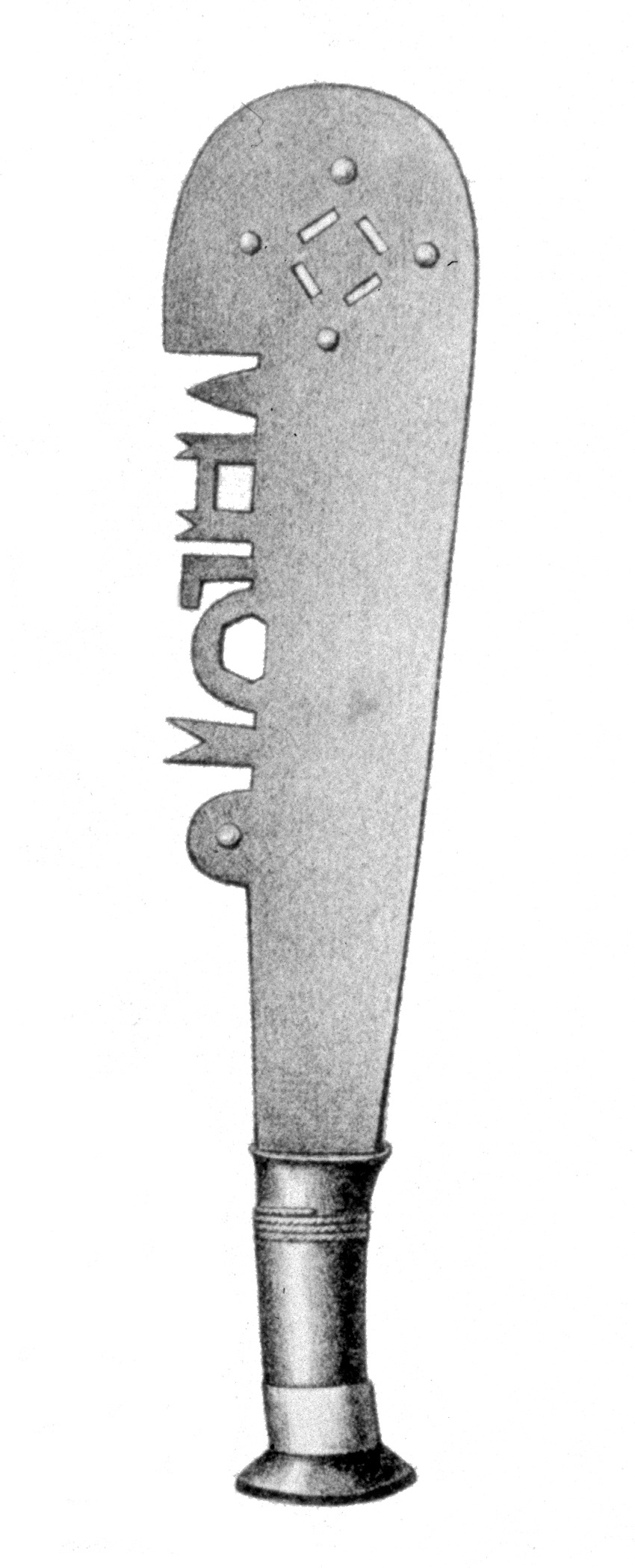
Cimpaba

== Uses ==
It is a Woyo dignitary's symbol. It is part of the attributes of power of the Mangoyo (the king). Its shape is very special and cannot be confused with any other type of African knives or swords, the handle is often made of ivory. The cimpaba is also used among the Kakongo and the Vili in the Muanda region, in the lower Congo.

== Bibliography ==
- Joseph Balu Balila, L'investiture des chefs spirituels Woyo, 1998, 81 p.
- Joseph-Aurélien Cornet, Pictographies Woyo, PORO, Associazione degli Amici dell'Arte Extraeuropea, Milan, 1980, 141 p.
- Harriet McGuire, « Woyo pot lids », African Arts (Los Angeles), n° 13-2, février 1980, p. 54-56.
- Habi Buganza Mulinda, « Aux origines du royaume de Ngoyo », Civilisations, n°41, 1993, p. 165-187.
