= Woyo masks =

African ritual object

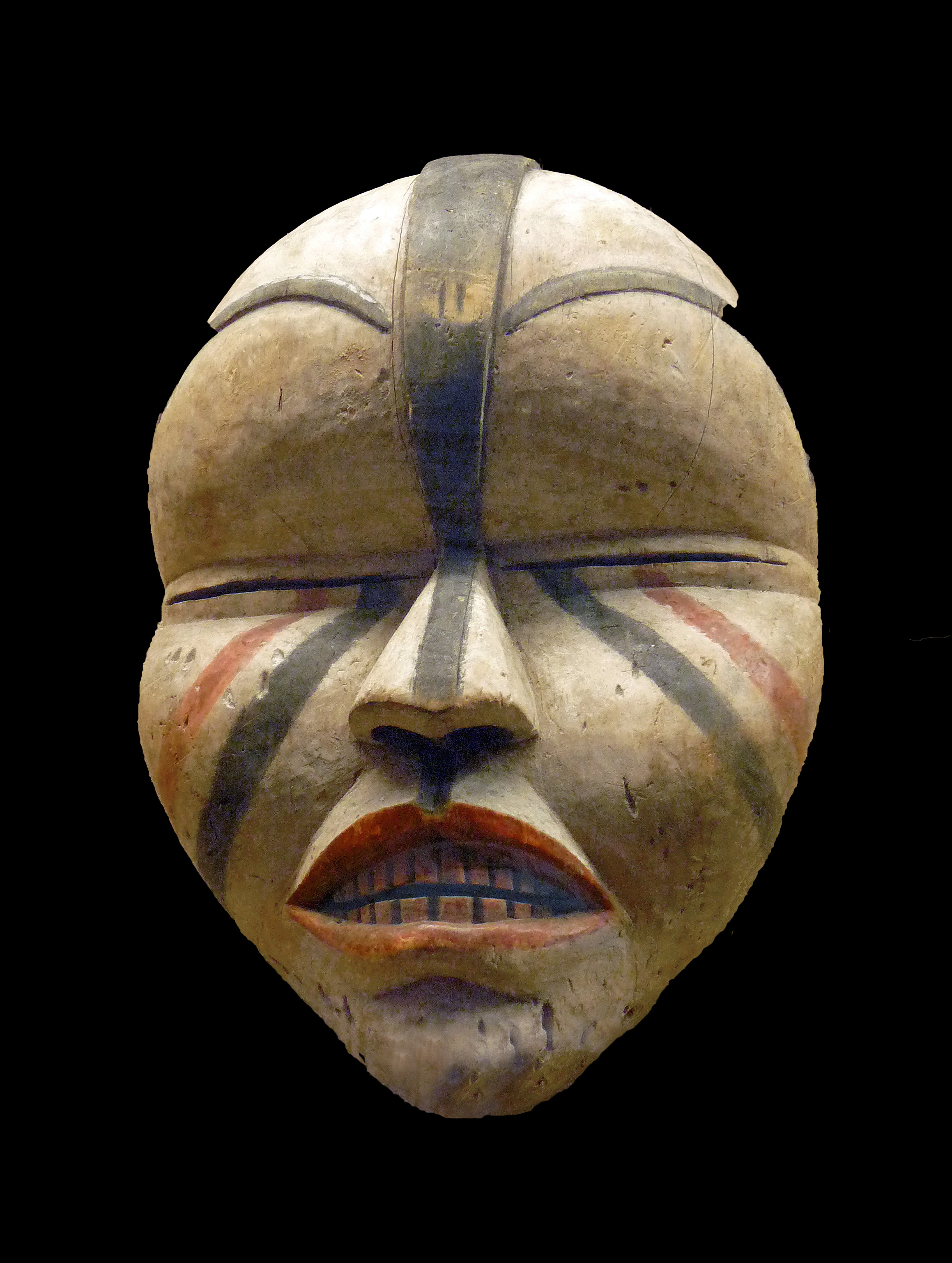
A Woyo mask in the Royal Museum for Central Africa.

Woyo masks are ritual masks made by the Woyo people of Central Africa. The masks are typically larger than a face and worn with a costume made of dried banana leaves or turaco plumage that covers the entire body. The masks, drums, and other aspects of a ritual dance were often called ndunga or bandunga derived from a secret society of men of the same name. The ndunga society enacts sentencing for crimes by channeling the will of their ancestors and supernatural spirits or deities. The people of this area were called Ngoyo by Europeans.

== Materials and meaning ==
The Woyo masks are crafted from gourds. Then they are carved out of wood for use, and painted with contrasting colors. The colors used had symbolic meaning; the whitening of masks often meant it was female. In some cases the masks are repainted to symbolize rebirth, or in a ritual to restore the power of the mask. The masks are often used as tributes to Nkisi, the local deities. The masks were worn mostly by men in ceremonial dances known as the ndunga. They were also used in various ceremonies like those aimed to protect against disaster, an initiation of a chief or funerals of high-ranking officials. The ndunga society wore the masks, costume, and a whip or sword as symbols of their ability to channel the ancestors will in criminal matters.
