= Traditional African masks =

Ritual and ceremonial mask of Sub-Saharan Africa

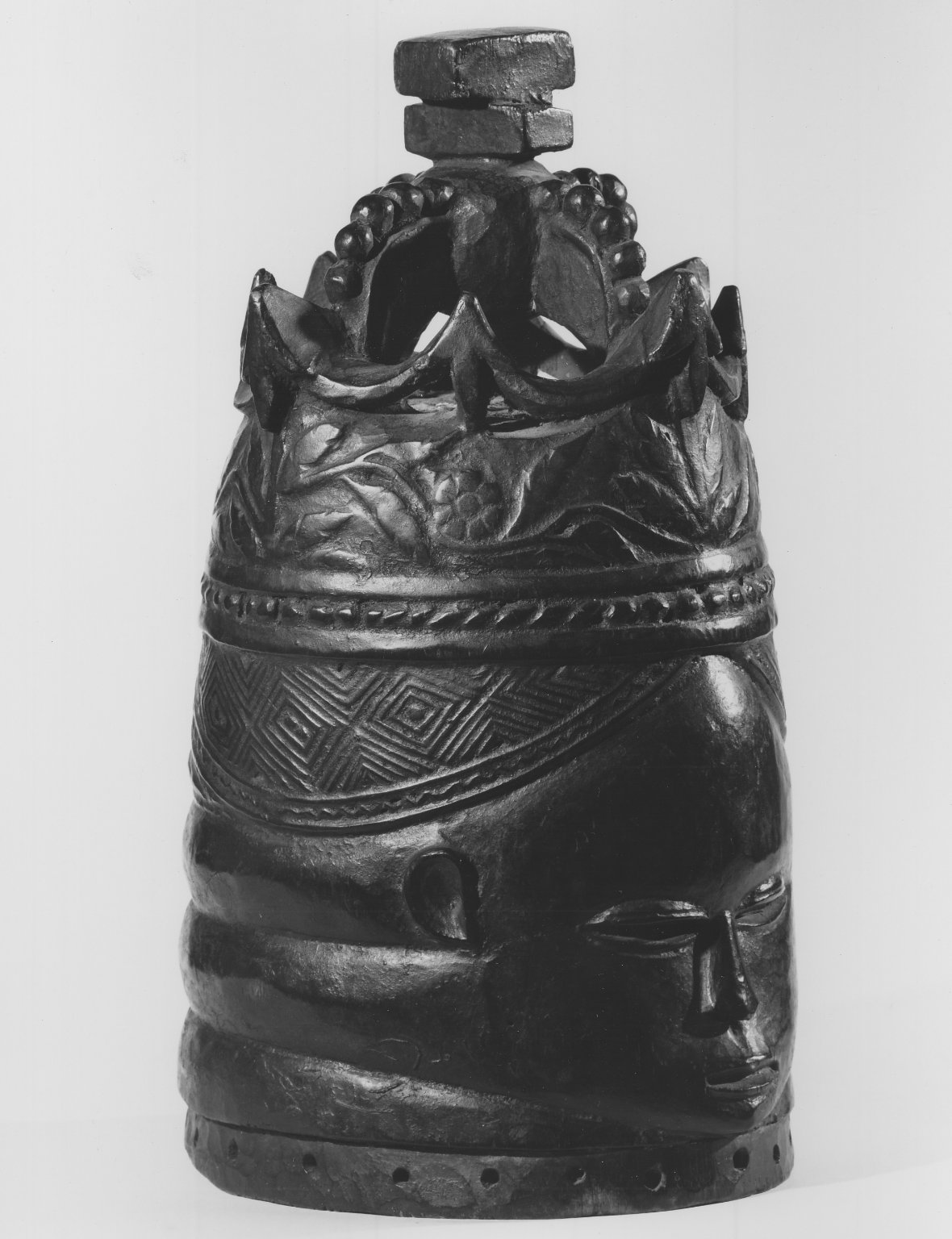
Sande society sowei mask, 20th century

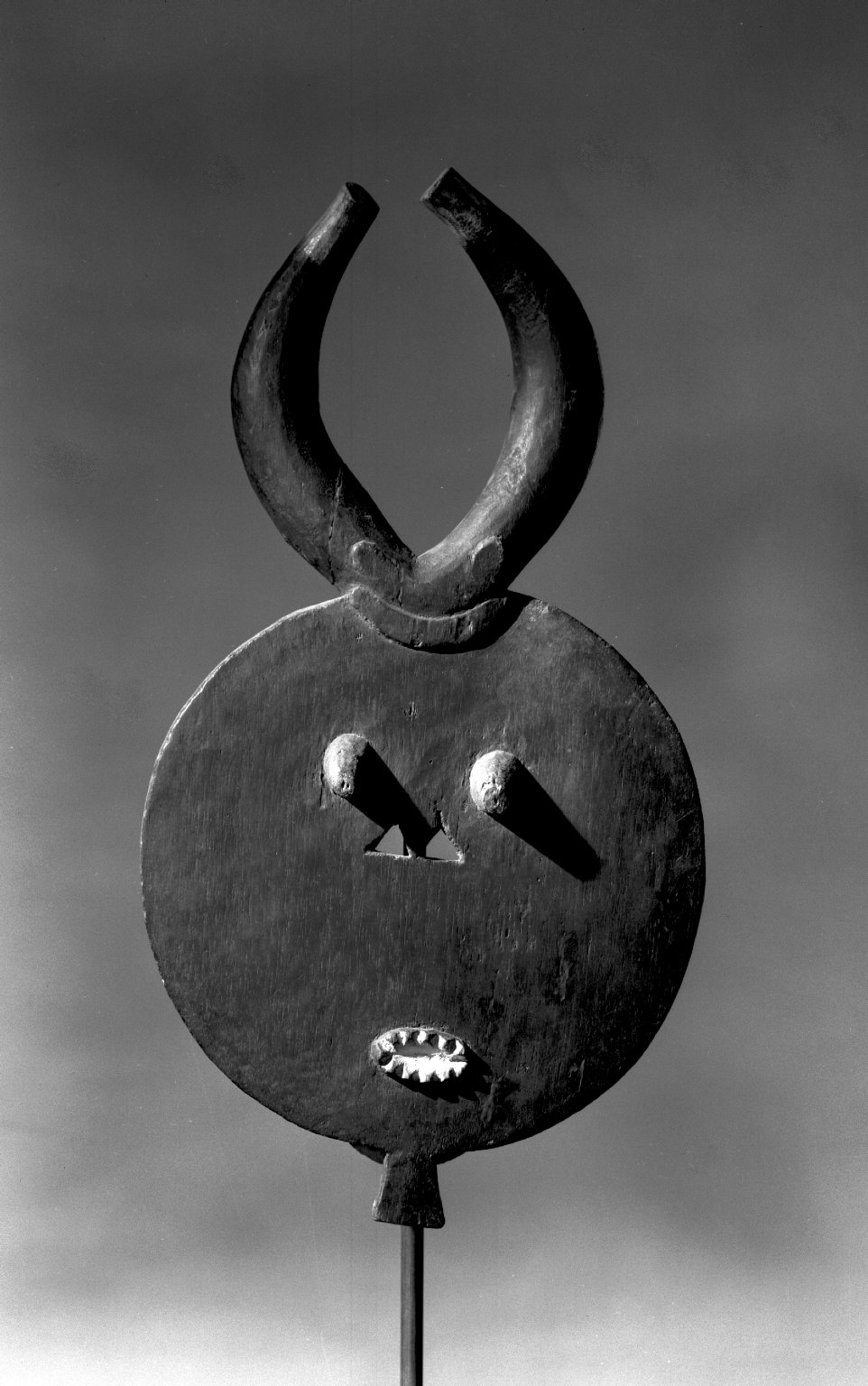
Baoule Kple Kple Mask

Traditional African masks are worn in ceremonies and rituals across West, Central, and Southern Africa. They are used in events such as harvest celebrations, funerals, rites of passage, weddings and coronations. Some societies also use masks to resolve disputes and conflicts

For example, members of the masquerade cult and Uma-Ada fraternity facilitate social justice and reconciliation processes among Igbo communities in Eastern Nigeria through masquerade performances. Mende and Vai women of the Sande society in Sierra Leone don the Sowei mask during rites of passage, specifically initiation ceremonies for young girls. The Plank Mask (Nwantantay) among the Bobo, Bwa, and Mossi people of Burkina Faso makes an appearance during public events such as funerals and agricultural festivals.

== Origins ==
Masks are a prominent feature of African cultural heritage. The history, use, and symbolism of masks vary across national, ethnic, and cultural identities. In West Africa, masking traditions are closely linked with the history of masquerades.

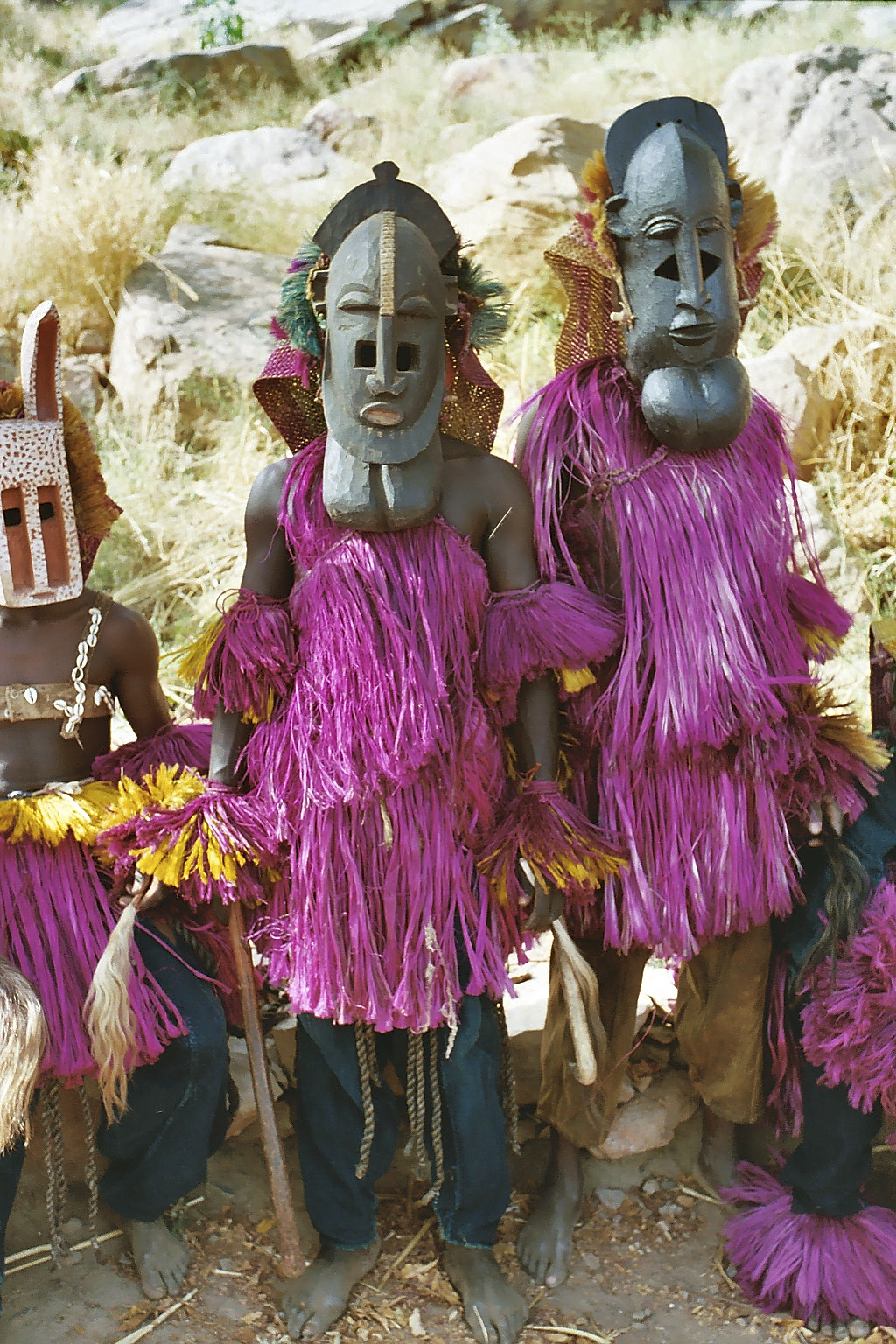
Dogon Masks and Ceremonial Costumes

Though the precise origins of masking traditions in precolonial Africa remain unknown, Raphael Chijioke Njoku theorized that masquerades developed among the Bantu people sometime before 3000-2500 BCE. Njoku states, "migrants could not have been able to propagate the idea outside their original homeland if they were not already well acquainted with the diverse ramifications of its practice."

Other theories are drawn from folklore and legends. Based on an Igbo legend, masquerades were first introduced to the town of Arondizuogu by Okoye Nwaobi or Okoye Mmonwu ("Okoye the Masquerade"), a villager who employed masked figures to scare away his opponent during a land dispute.

Alex Asigbo argued that masquerade cults were developed by male elders as a form of social control. Through the age-old practices of witchcraft and sorcery, women were thought to possess immense power over their male counterparts. "Masquerades therefore perform certain social control functions by enforcing discipline and upholding natural law." With the exception of the Sande society, women in most African societies are not allowed to actively participate in masquerade activities. The masks themselves are usually carved by men and the knowledge and secrets of the craft are transmitted through the male line.

== Symbolism ==
Masks may symbolize spirits of the dead, totem animals, and other supernatural forces. During a performance, the masked masquerader transforms into the spirit or entity represented by the mask. The transformation of the mask wearer's identity is reinforced through song and dance. Nwantantay or plank masks, for example, represent spirits of the natural word associated with water ranging from insects to waterfowl. In accompaniment with singers and drummers, a masquerader donning the mask "moves rapidly, imitating the behavior of a flying spirit."

Some groups like the Dogon people of Mali possess several masks, each with its own unique function. The Dogon are governed by three main religious orders: the Awa (cult of the dead), Bini (cult of the ancestors), and Lebe (cult of nature). The anthropologist Marcel Griaule documented at least 78 varieties of masks corresponding with spirits and deities in the Dogon pantheon.

The importance of the spirit portrayed is often reflected by the masks's complexity and artistic quality. The kple kple mask from the Baoule people of Ivory Coast is considered the "least prestigious" of Goli masks, hence its minimal and unadorned features.

== Subject and style ==
African masks usually emulate a human or animal face in an abstract way. The inherent lack of realism in African masks (and African art in general) is justified by the fact that most African cultures clearly distinguish the essence of a subject from its looks, the former, rather than the latter, being the actual subject of artistic representation. An extreme example is given by nwantantay masks of the Bwa people (Burkina Faso) that represent the flying spirits of the forest; since these spirits are deemed to be invisible, the corresponding masks are shaped after abstract, purely geometrical forms.

Stylish elements in a mask's looks are codified by the tradition and may either identify a specific community or convey specific meanings. For example, both the Bwa and the Buna people of Burkina Faso have hawk masks, with the shape of the beak identifying a mask as either Bwa or Buna. In both cases, the hawk's wings are decorated with geometric patterns that have moral meanings; saw-shaped lines represent the hard path followed by ancestors, while chequered patterns represent the interaction of opposites (male-female, night-day, and so on)

Traits representing moral values are found in many cultures. Masks from the Senufo people of Ivory Coast, for example, have their eyes half closed, symbolizing a peaceful attitude, self-control, and patience. In Sierra Leone and elsewhere, small eyes and mouth represent humility, and a wide, protruding forehead represents wisdom. In Gabon, large chins and mouths represent authority and strength. The Grebo of the Ivory Coast carve masks with round eyes to represent alertness and anger, with the straight nose representing an unwillingness to retreat.

=== Animals ===
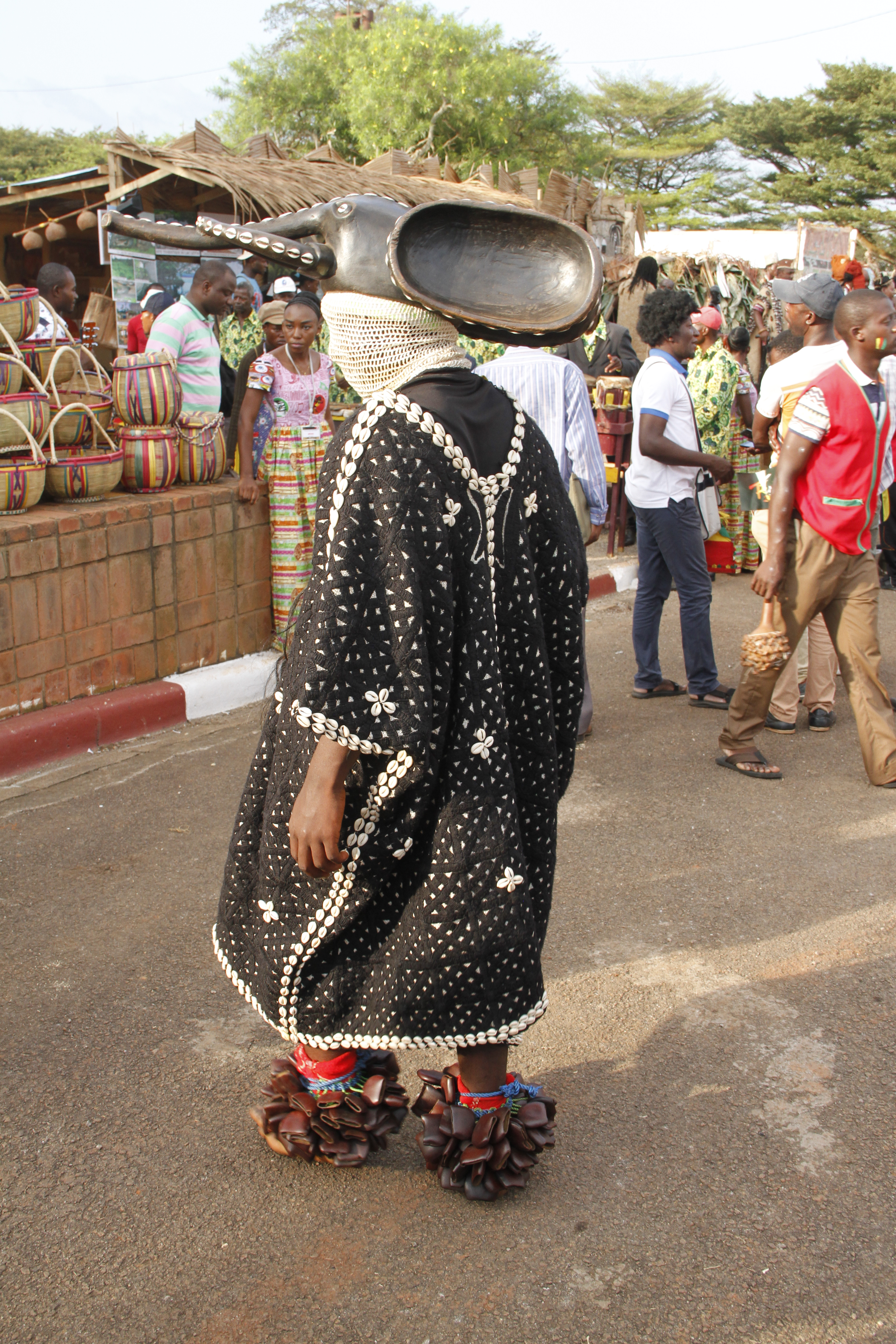
Elephant mask and dancer traditional to Oku, Cameroon

Animals are common subjects in African masks. Animal masks typically embody the spirit of animals, so that the mask-wearer becomes a medium to speak to animals themselves (e.g. to ask wild beasts to stay away from the village); in many cases, nevertheless, an animal is also (sometimes mainly) a symbol of specific virtues. Common animal subjects include the buffalo (usually representing strength, as in the Baoulé culture), crocodile, hawk, hyena, warthog and antelope. Antelopes have a fundamental role in many cultures of the Mali area (for example in Dogon and Bambara culture) as representatives of agriculture. Dogon antelope masks are highly abstract, with a general rectangular shape and many horns (a representation of abundant harvest. Bambara antelope masks (called chiwara) have long horns representing the thriving growth of millet, legs (representing roots), long ears (representing the songs sung by the working women at harvest time), and a saw-shaped line that represents the path followed by the Sun between solstices. A 12th/13th century mural from Old Dongola, the capital of the Nubian kingdom of Makuria, depicts dancing masks decorated with cowrie shells imitating some animal with long snouts and big ears.

A common variation on the animal-mask theme is the composition of several distinct animal traits in a single mask, sometimes along with human traits. Merging distinct animal traits together is sometimes a means to represent unusual, exceptional virtue or high status. For example, the Poro secret societies of the Senufo people of the Ivory Coast have masks that celebrate the exceptional power of the society by merging three different "danger" symbols: antelope horns, crocodile teeth, and warthog fangs. Another well-known example is that of kifwebe masks of the Songye people (Congo Basin), that mix the stripes of a zebra (or okapi), the teeth of a crocodile, the eyes of a chameleon, the mouth of an aardvark, the crest of a rooster, the feathers of an owl and more.

=== Feminine beauty ===
Another common subject of African masks is a woman's face, usually based on a specific culture's ideal of feminine beauty. Female masks of the Punu people of Gabon, for example, have long curved eyelashes, almond-shaped eyes, thin chin, and traditional ornaments on their cheeks, as all these are considered good-looking traits. Feminine masks of the Baga people have ornamental scars and breasts. In many cases, wearing masks that represent feminine beauty is strictly reserved for men.

One of the well-known representations of female beauty is the Idia mask of Benin. It is believed to have been commissioned by King Esigie of Benin in memory of his mother. To honor his dead mother, the king wore the mask on his hip during special ceremonies.

=== Ancestor masks (masks of the dead) ===
As the veneration of defunct ancestors is a fundamental element of most African traditional cultures, it is not surprising that the dead is also a common subject for masks. Masks referring to dead ancestors are most often shaped after a human skull. A well-known example is the mwana pwo (literally, "young woman") of the Chokwe people (Angola), that mixes elements referring to feminine beauty (well-proportioned oval face, small nose and chin) and other referring to death (sunken eye sockets, cracked skin, and tears); it represents a female ancestor who died young, venerated in rites such as circumcision rites and ceremonies associated to the renewal of life. As veneration of the dead is most often associated with fertility and reproduction, many dead-ancestor masks also have sexual symbols; the ndeemba mask of the Yaka people (Angola and DR Congo), for example, is shaped after a skull complemented with a phallic-shaped nose.

A special class of ancestor masks are those related to notable, historical or legendary people. The mwaash ambooy mask of the Kuba people (DR Congo), for example, represents the legendary founder of the Kuba Kingdom, Woot, while the mgady amwaash mask represents his wife Mweel.

=== Miniature masks ===
In parts of West Africa miniature versions of masks have traditionally been used as personal items of belief, acting as spiritual guides and protectors during travels, keeping a spiritual connection to the original full-scale mask. Due to commodification in the wake of colonization, the passport masks have been mis-represented as symbols of free passage similar to passports.

== Materials and structure ==
The most commonly used material for masks is wood, although a wide variety of other elements can be used, including light stone such as steatite, metals such as copper or bronze, different types of fabric, pottery, and more. Some masks are painted (for example using ochre or other natural colorants). A wide array of ornamental items can be applied to the mask surface; examples include animal hair, horns, or teeth, sea shells, seeds, straw, egg shell, and feathers. Animal hair or straw are often used for a mask's hair or beard.

The general structure of a mask varies depending on the way it is intended to be worn. The most common type applies to the wearer's face, like most Western (e.g., carnival) masks. Others are worn like hats on the top of the wearer's head; examples include those of the Ekhoi people of Nigeria and Bwa people of Burkina Faso, as well as the famous chiwara masks of the Bambara people. Some masks (for example those of the Sande society of Liberia and the Mende people of Sierra Leone, that are made from hollow tree stumps) are worn like helmets covering both the head and face. Some African cultures have mask-like ornaments that are worn on the chest rather than the head of face; this includes those used by the Makonde people of East Africa in ndimu ceremonies.

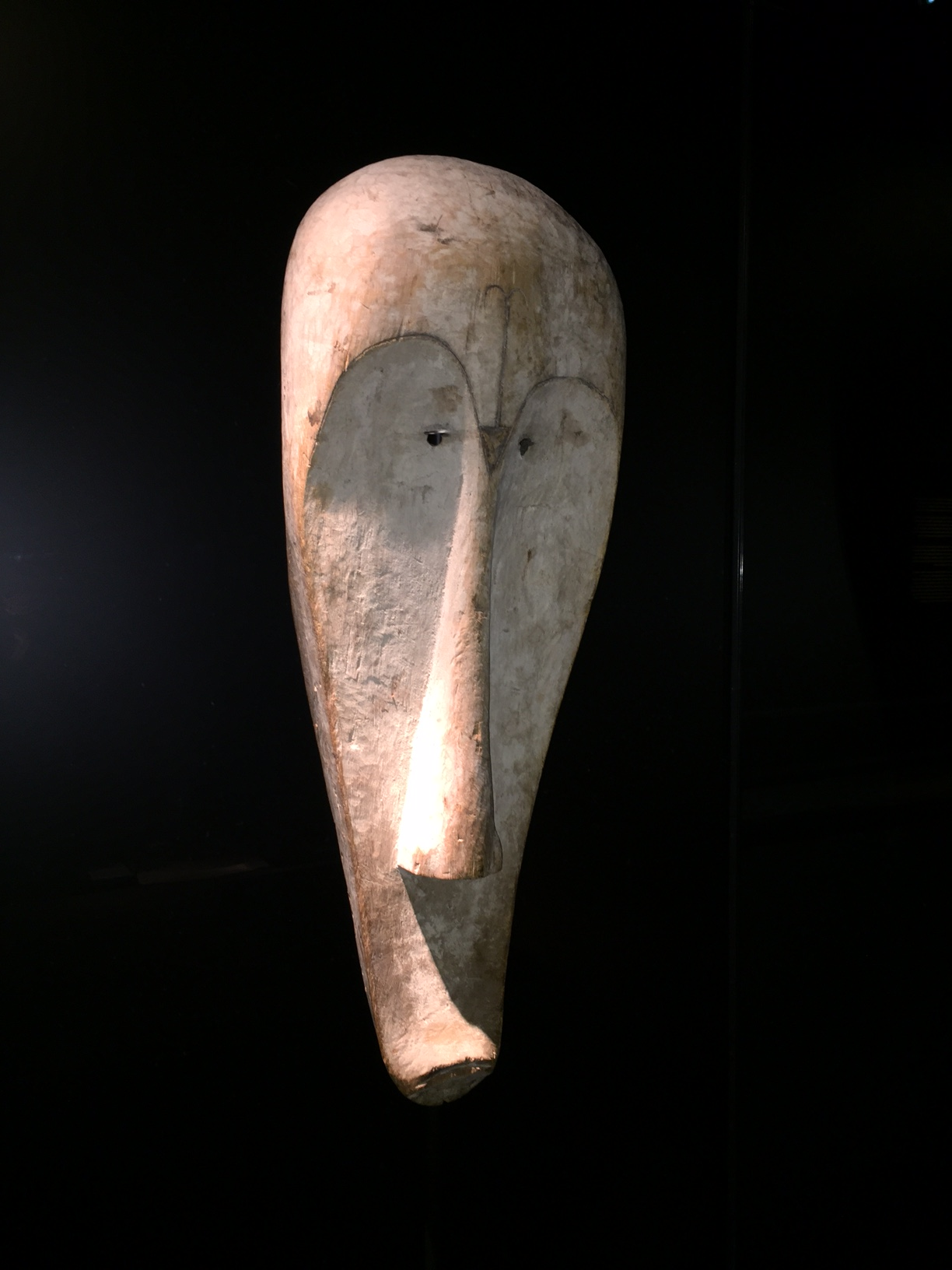
Ngil mask from Gabon or Cameroon; wood colored with kaolin (chiny clay); by Fang people; Ethnological Museum of Berlin (Germany). Worn with full costume in a night masquerade to settle disputes and quell misbehavior, this calm visage was terrifying to wrong-doers

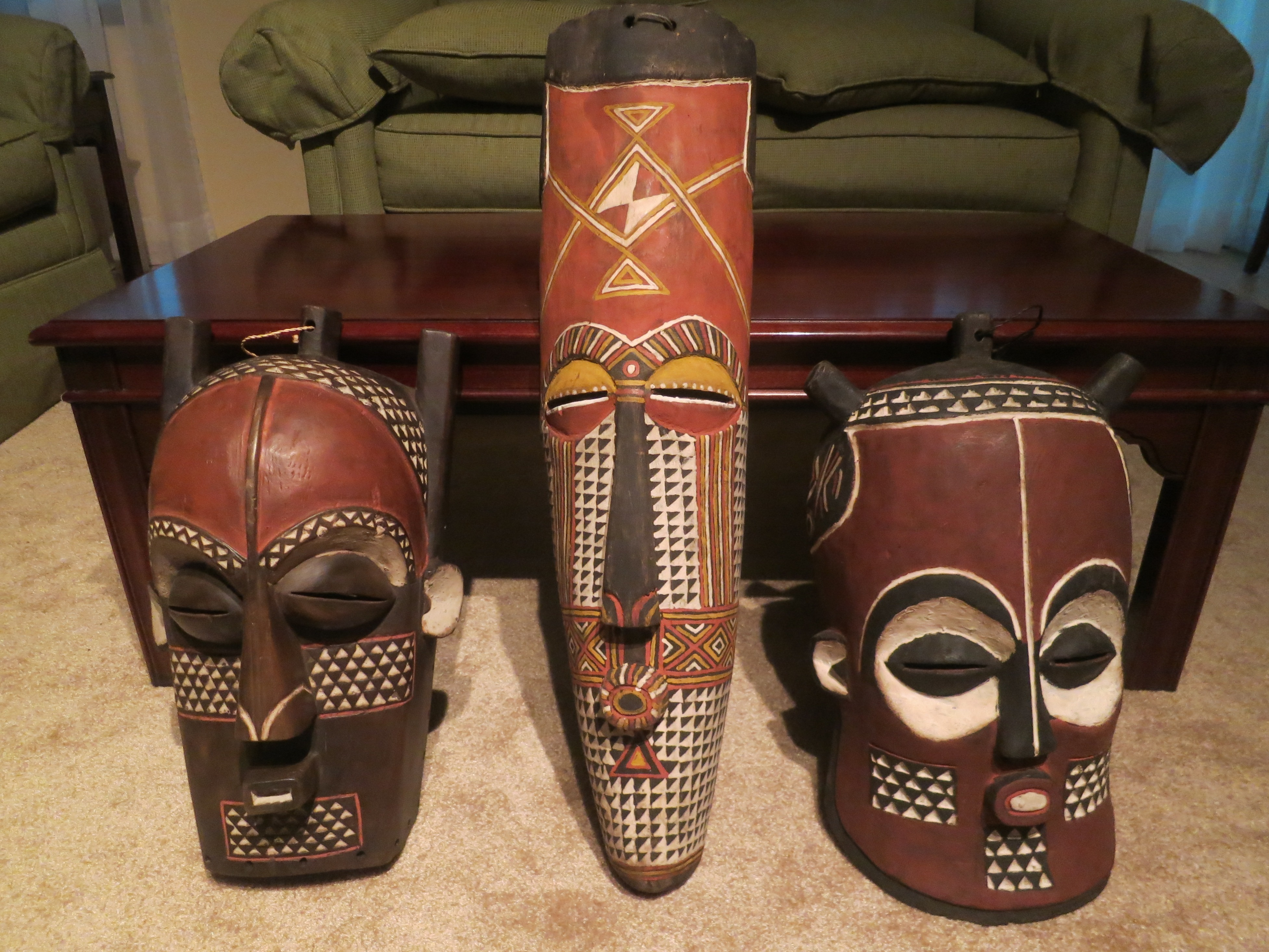
BaKongo masks from the Kongo Central region

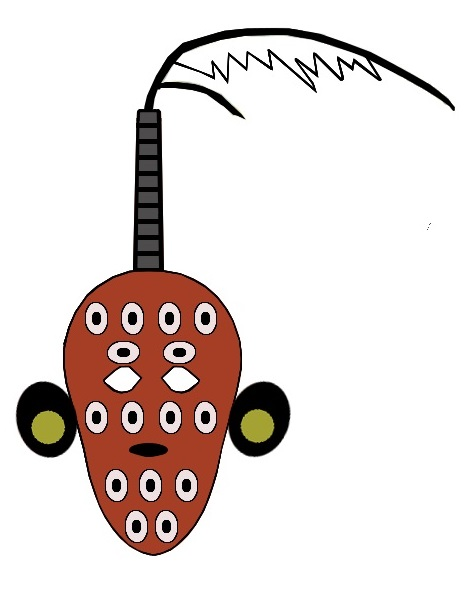
Zoomorphic mask as depicted on a Makurian mural from Old Dongola (12th/13th century)

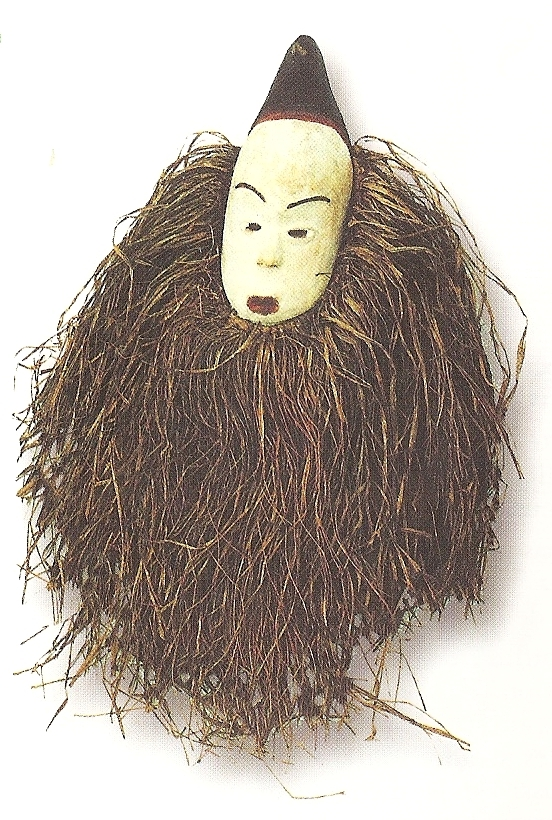
A mask of the Mitsogo people of Gabon

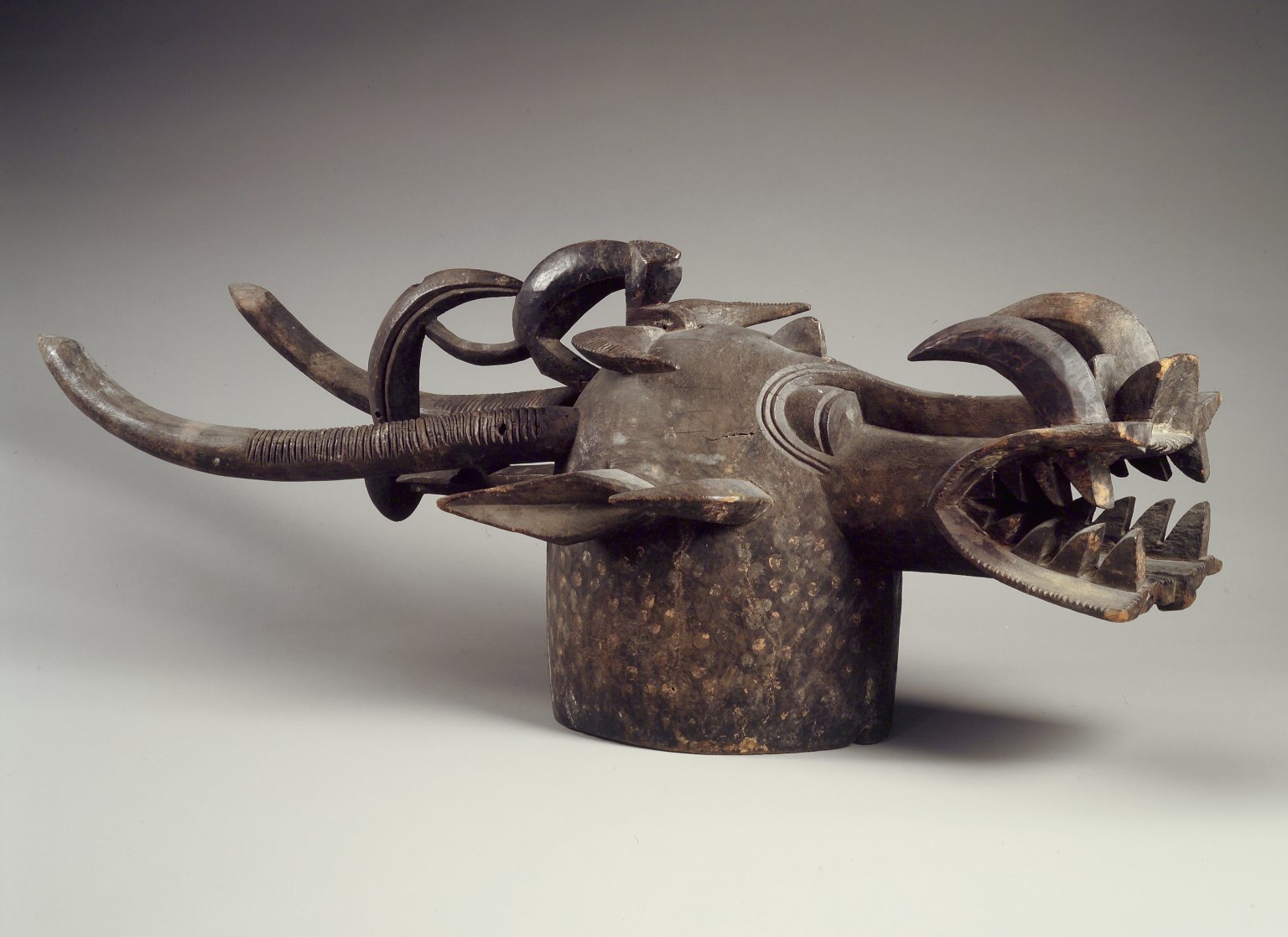
Wabele mask, Senufo people, Brooklyn Museum

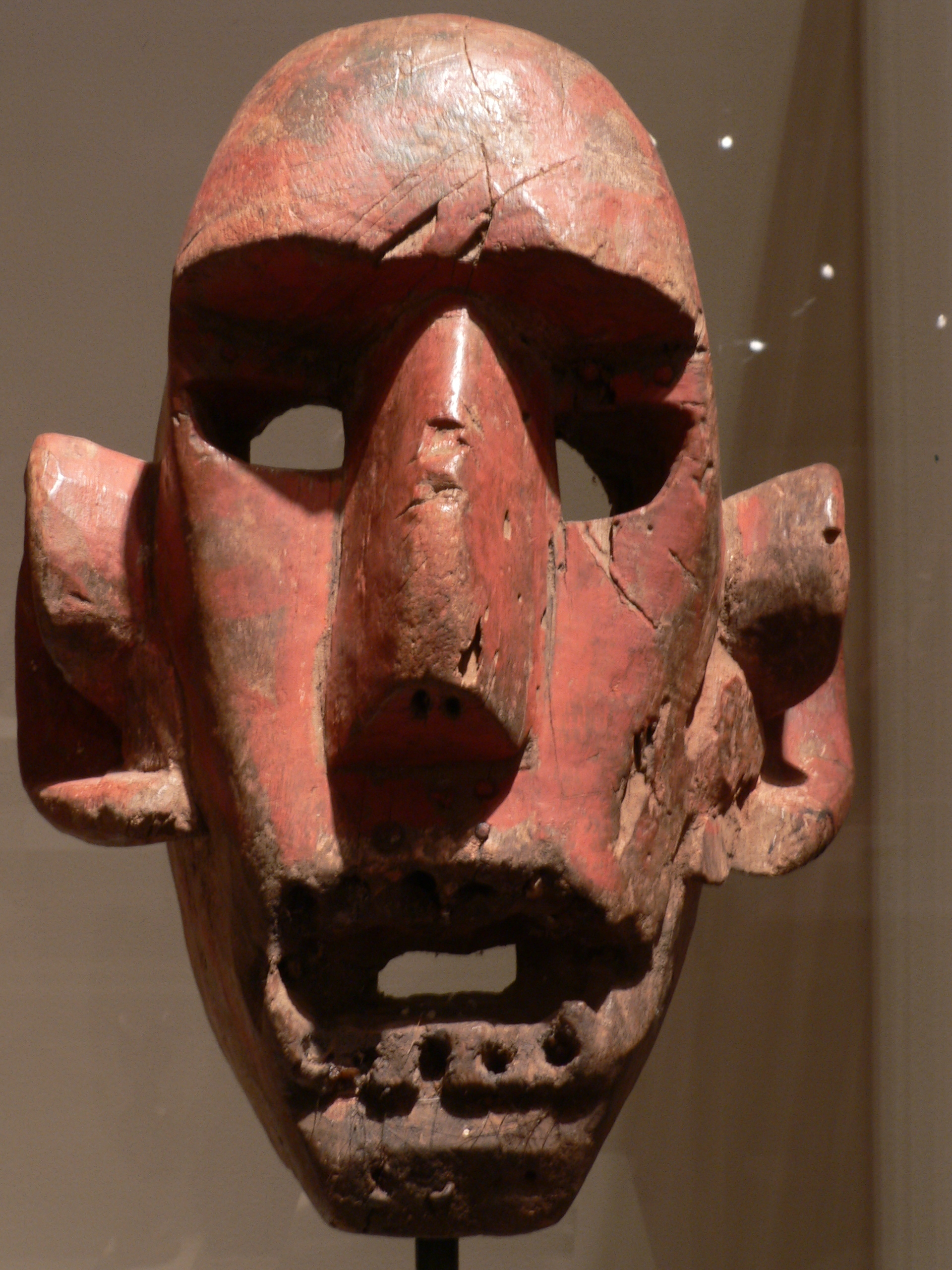
Doei (or Kwere), female ancestor mask, Tanzania

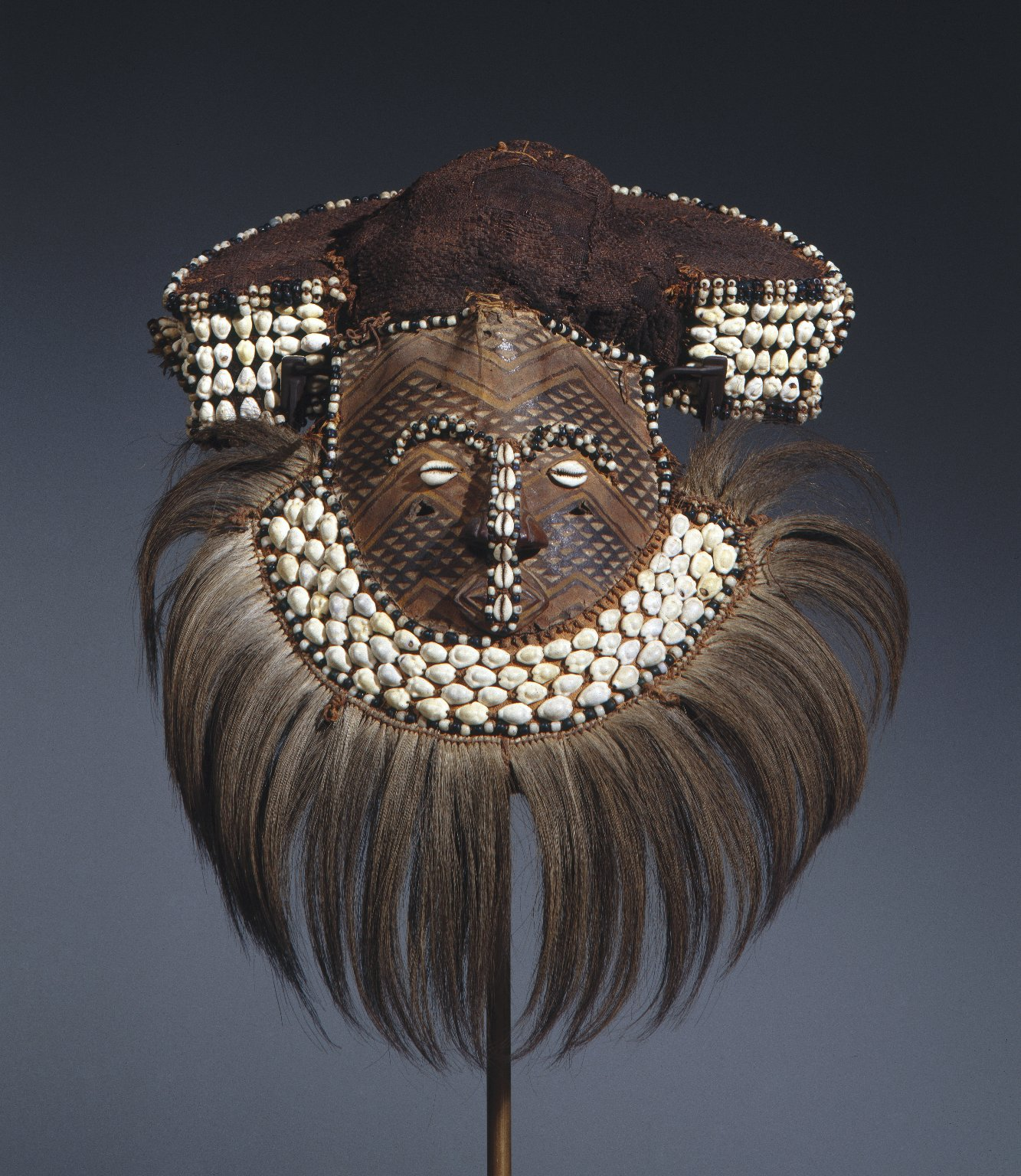
Mwaash aMbooy Mask Brooklyn Museum

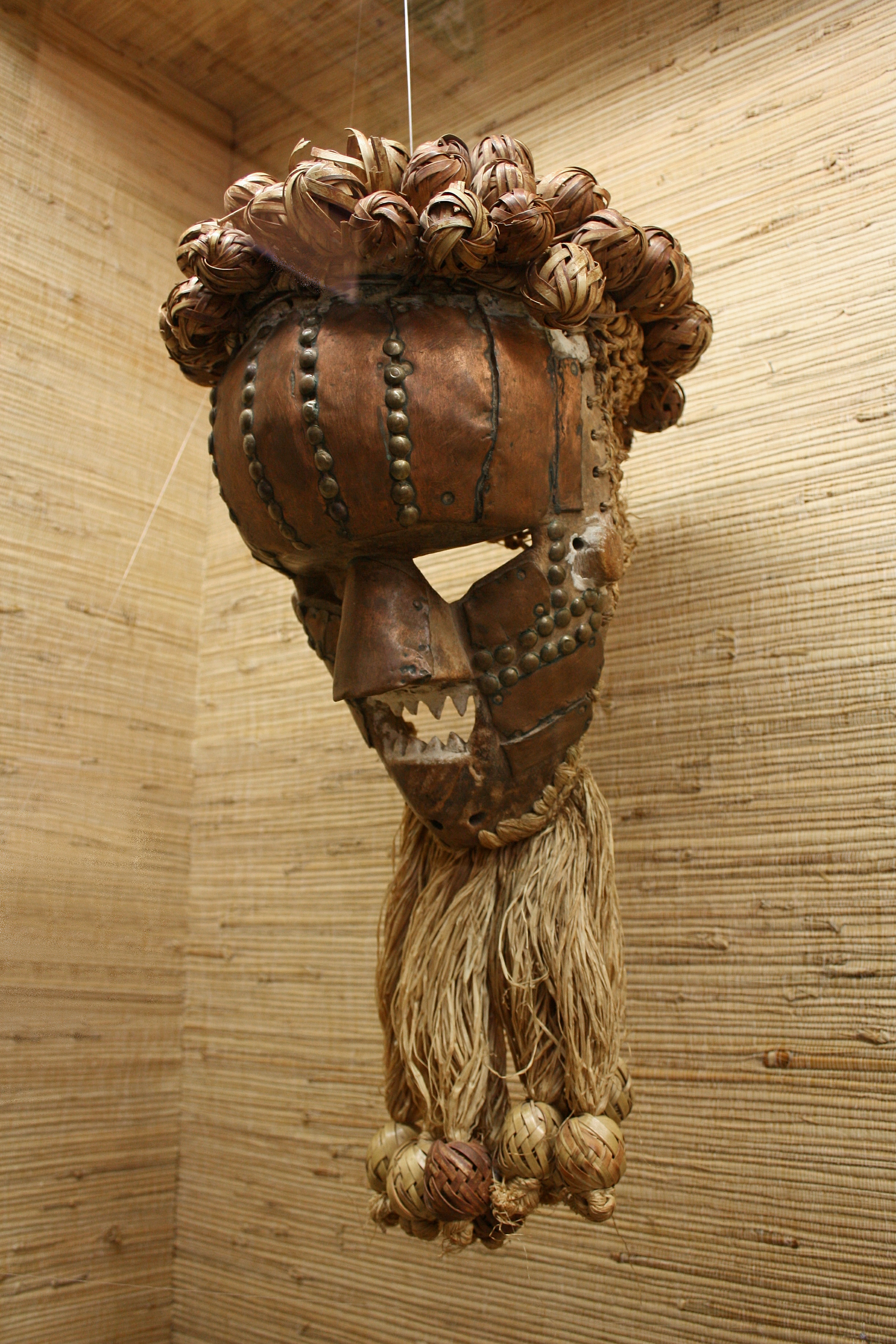
A copper and wood mask from Central Africa

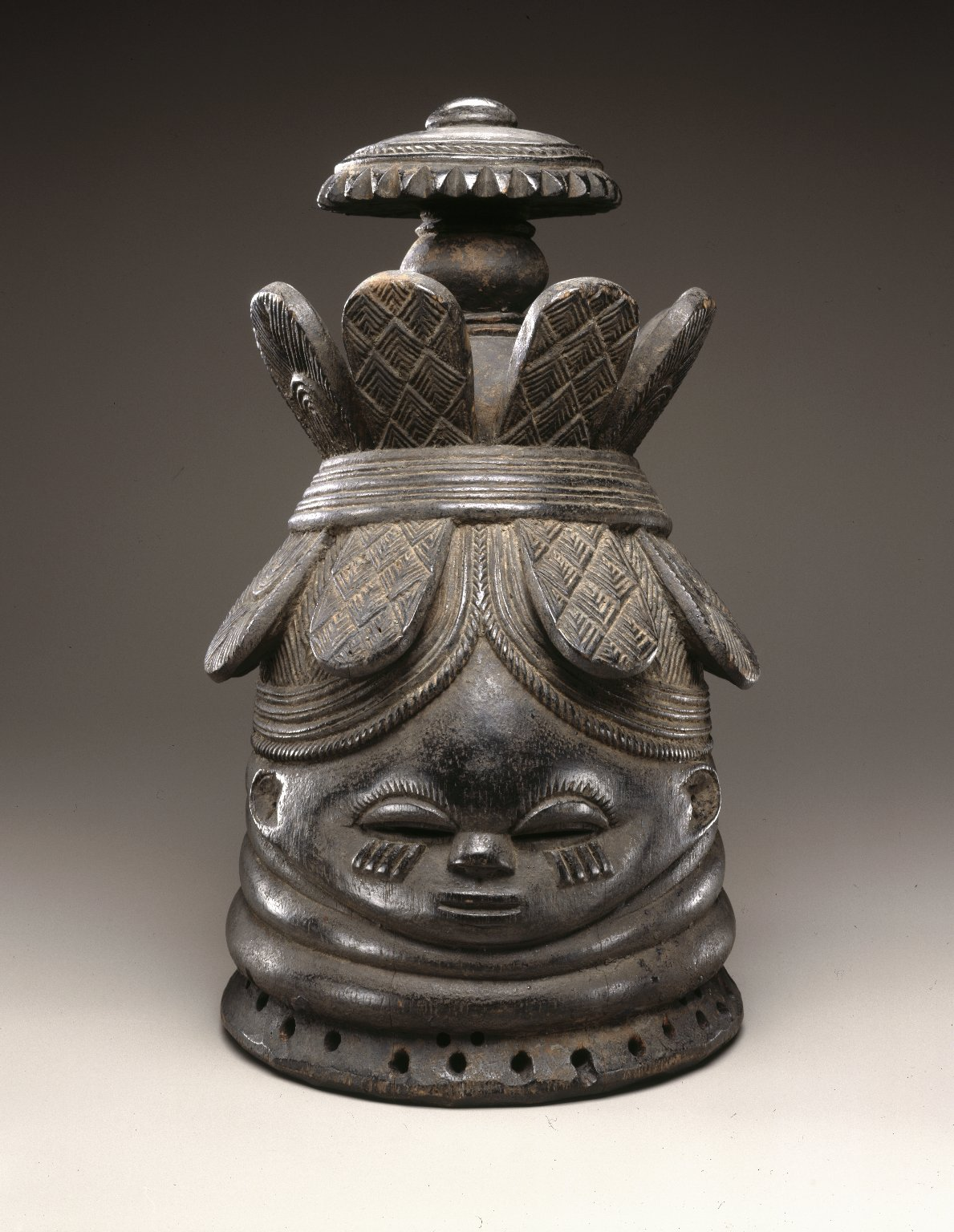
Helmet Mask for Sande Society Brooklyn Museum

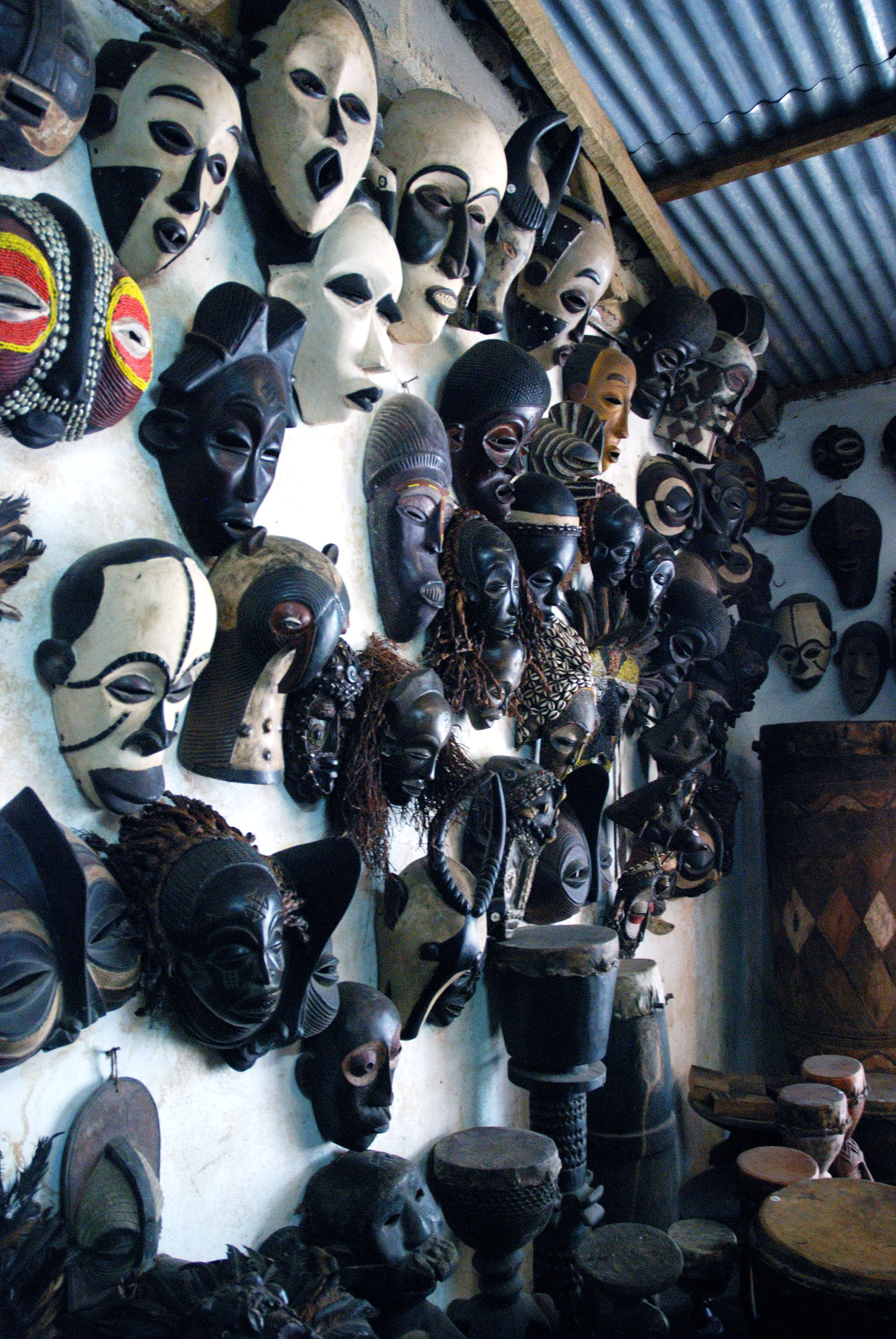
Commercial masks for sale in a shop in the Mwenge Makonde market, Dar es Salaam

== Commercially produced masks ==
As African masks are largely appropriated by Europeans, they are widely commercialized and sold in most tourist-oriented markets and shops in Africa (as well as "ethnic" shops in the Western world). As a consequence, the traditional art of mask-making has gradually ceased to be a privileged, status-related practice, and mass production of masks has become widespread. While, in most cases, commercial masks are (more or less faithful) reproductions of traditional masks, this connection is weakening over time, as the logics of mass-production make it harder to identify the actual geographical and cultural origins of the masks found in such venues as curio shops and tourist markets. For example, the Okahandja market in Namibia mostly sells masks that are produced in Zimbabwe (as they are cheaper and more easily available than local masks), and, in turn, Zimbabwean mask-makers reproduce masks from virtually everywhere in Africa rather than from their own local heritage.

== Scarification ==
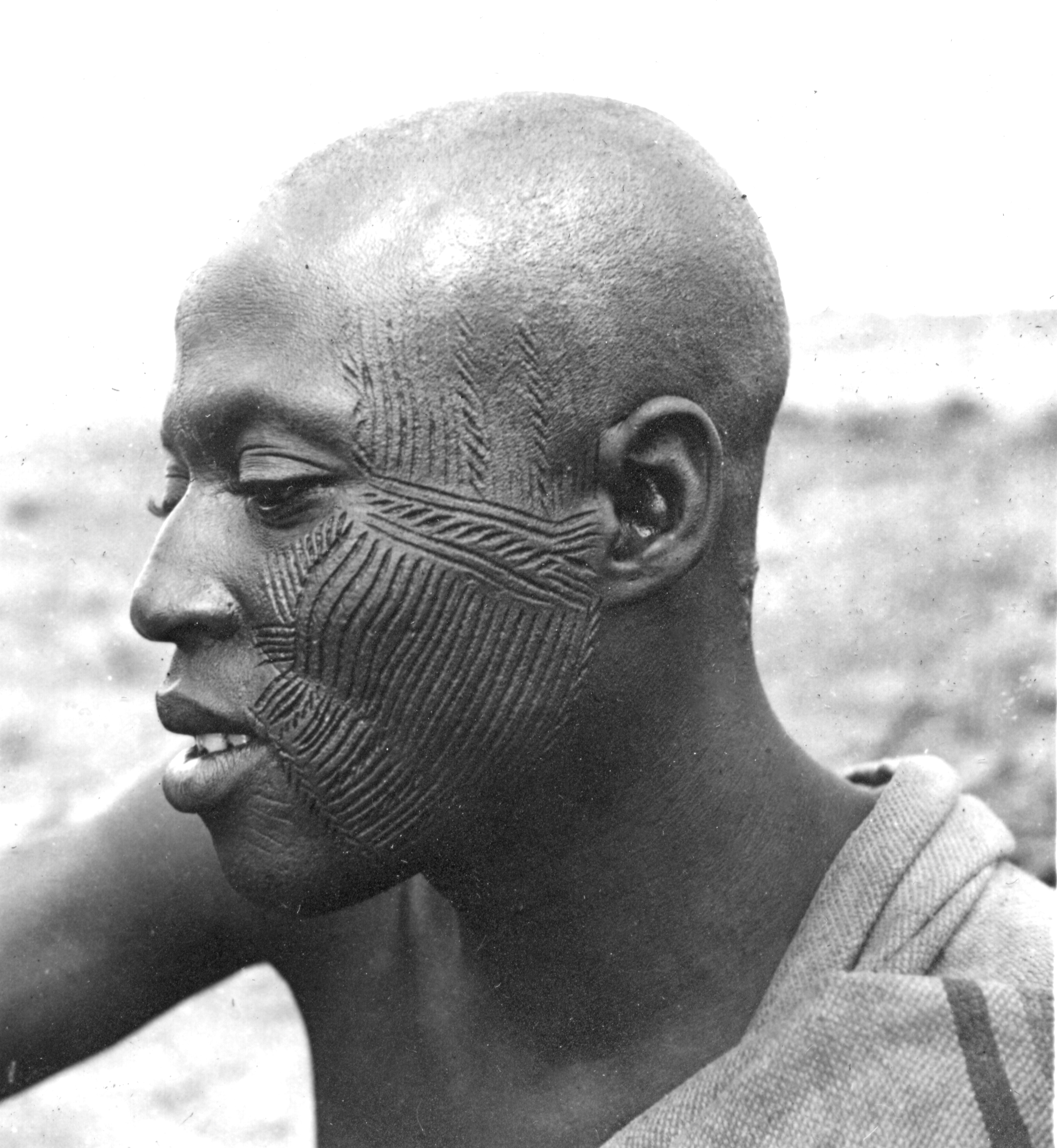
Example of facial scarification in an African person, c. 1940s

Scarification has long functioned as a form of 'body masking' among traditional African cultures that have been used in rites of passage, as symbols of status, religious signification, and identification with occupation or tribe. Used as a facet of early tattoo, these markings have been employed since the beginnings of African Culture to portray religious inscriptions and various symbolic patterns on darkly pigmented skin that ink-based tattoo is unable to replicate. Scarification is often done on the face, arms, or torso by stretching the subject's skin and making repeated, purposeful incisions, followed by a healing procedure procured specifically to slow the process of healing by removing scabs or inserting crocodile dung into the lesions, intending to incite keloid formation. These scars serve in numerous realms of African Culture, and are commonplace as accommodations to one's identity, "indicating age, puberty, marital status, social status and merits, and they are perceived as signs of attractiveness".

Scarification within traditional African tribal communities symbolizes a vast array of spiritual, social, and decorative elements that are frequently used in identifying oneself with a tribe, spiritual ideology, or achievement.

=== Tribal Scarification ===
Examples of tribal scarification include the Nigerian Yoruba's Kolo, meant to symbolize perseverance and resolution, both of South Sudan's Dinka and Nuer's tribal forehead scars, which distinguish the two during the concurrent South Sudanese Civil War, alongside other Ghanaian ethnic groups (Mamprusi, Nanumba, Gonja, etc.) This tribal scarification has been observed to mirror the traditional African masks of the native groups in the area.

=== Spiritual Scarification ===
Examples of spiritual scarification are used to identify oneself with the motifs of a certain ancestor-animal, or ideology; often times done in pursuit of animistic or religious purpose.

Scarification that emphasizes sacred animalistic symbolism occurs throughout African culture, including:

- The Nigerian Bali and the Tanzanian Bondei and Shambaa groups' depiction of their mythological ancestor bird symbolizes their belief in reincarnation.
- The South Sudanese Moru and Tofinu, and other regional tribes have crocodile-based scar patterns.
- The Zambian, Malawian, and Zimbabwean facial keloid scar intends to symbolize the buffalo's spiritual prowess in African culture.
- Other South Sudanese tribes embellished themselves with hoof-shaped motifs that mirror those of a cattle branding.

However, some scarification occurs out of devout religious pursuit, as in contrast to purposeful incision, extensive periods of prayer within Islamic and Muslim African communities create black dots on the foreheads of followers extremely loyal to their beliefs.

=== Merit/Ritual Scarification ===
Examples of merit-based and ritual scarification include rite-of-passage ceremonies, recognition of tribal huntsmanship, and devotion to one's lineage.

During rite-of-passage ceremonies, the procedure of ritual scarification comes in a few forms:

- Ritual scarification can be intended to identify oneself with "taboo" societies that use scarification as a means of perfection.
- Ritual scarification is more commonly used to initiate one into adulthood, shown through the Tiv people's ritual scarification of women, signifying a woman's puberty in which she transforms into a "sacred object", where the scarification is used as the catalyst of her transformation.
- Another way ritual scarification is used is to develop depictions of familial lineage upon a woman's body.

Merit-based Scarification is most often attributed to huntsmen and woman of marital status or age.

- 'Slayer' scars are given to huntsmen based on their accolades in battle, the hunt, or societal basis. The motifs behind these markings are meant to symbolize a hunter's constant strides towards reincarnation. "Even young boys are decorated with circular brandings as a tribal identification marker and as a sign of the desire to become a brave man in the future".
- Women tend to wear dotted scars on their faces and bodies to signify female beauty, or indicate their social rank, marital status, etc.

== See also ==
- Tribal art
- African art
- African sculpture
- Picasso's African Period
- FESTIMA, a festival celebrating traditional masks
- Toloy
- Woyo masks
