= Cultural code =

Cultural code refers to several related concepts about the body of shared practices, expectations and conventions specific to a given domain of a culture.

Under one interpretation, a cultural code is seen as defining a set of images that are associated with a particular group of stereotypes in our minds. This is sort of cultural unconscious, which is hidden even from our own understanding, but is also seen in our actions. The cultural codes of a nation helps to understand the behavioral responses characteristic of that nation's citizens. The key codes in understanding specific behaviors differentiate between religion, gender, relationships, money, food, health, and cultures.

== See also ==
- Code (semiotics)
- Collective unconscious
- Meme
