= L Is for Love =

- The Loud House episode
- Title card
- Episode no.: Season 2 Episode 29
- Directed by: Chris Savino
- Written by: Kevin Sullivan
- Story by: Darin McGowan
- Production code: 212B
- Original air date: June 15, 2017
- Running time: 11 minutes

Episode chronology
← Previous "Potty Mouth"	Next → "ARGGH! You for Real?"

"L Is for Love" is the 75th overall episode of The Loud House, being the twenty-ninth episode of the second season in broadcast order and the second segment of the twelfth episode of the second season in production order. It first aired on June 15, 2017, and was directed by series creator Chris Savino and written by Kevin Sullivan, from a story by Darin McGowan. In this episode, the Loud siblings track down a secret admirer who has written several love letters addressed to a mysterious person labeled "L. Loud" in order to determine who the letters were for.

This episode is particularly notable for introducing the character of Sam Sharp, whom Luna is revealed to be attracted to, thereby making it the second episode of the series overall to establish an LGBTQ character, after the previous season's "Overnight Success".

== Plot ==
After finding a love letter addressed to "L. Loud" in the mail, Lincoln calls an emergency sibling meeting. Upon finding out that the person who sent the love letter wishes to remain anonymous, addressing themself as "your secret admirer," Lucy suggests that since the secret admirer is clearly shy, the siblings, who know that "L. Loud" could refer to any of them, should send a signal to each of their respective love interests. After the siblings all send a signal to their crushes, a second love letter comes in the mail. The provided detail that the intended recipient has brown hair narrows the search down to Luna, Luan, Lynn, and Lisa, who are the only brunettes in the family. Lucy then advises that the siblings give a token of affection to each of their love interests, which they promptly do the next day. When the final love letter comes in, the secret admirer mentions that they are attracted to the intended recipient's love for British culture, narrowing the result down to the resident Anglophile, Luna. The siblings then leave for the local British restaurant Banger's & Mosh, where the secret admirer told their love interest to meet up. While searching for Luna's crush, Sam, the siblings discover that the love letters were actually sent by their mother, Rita, and intended for their father, Lynn Sr., as they were celebrating the twentieth anniversary of their first date by recreating the process of Rita sending love letters to Lynn. Despite not having been the intended recipient the whole time, Luna is moved by the way her mother asked her father out on a date and, having been too shy to express her feelings for Sam the entire time, not only feels more confident to express her romantic attraction to Sam, but also advises that her siblings should do the same. The following day, the siblings all send love letters to their respective crushes. Sam, who turns out to be Luna's blonde female bandmate, reads her love letter and accepts it, leaving Luna proud that her crush has accepted her.

== Production ==
Following the introduction of the series' first LGBTQ couple, Howard and Harold McBride, the writing staff discussed the possibility of establishing one of Lincoln's sisters as LGBTQ. Michael Rubiner, who was a story editor at the time but later became the showrunner following Savino's termination from Nickelodeon, has gone on to say that "with 10 girls in the family, it seemed natural to explore one of them being LGBTQ." Kevin Sullivan, who had previously written the episode "Overnight Success" that introduced the McBride parents, was tasked with writing the episode. In order to effectively establish that Luna is a member of the LGBTQ community in a positive way, the writers laid out three principles for her and Sam's characterization: to give Luna's crush a gender-neutral name, to include a male musician (who was later revealed to be named Sully) in all shots featuring Sam to hide the surprise that she was female until the end of the episode, and that whenever Luna mentions Sam to her family, they know that she is referring to a girl and do not have any issues with it whatsoever. Sam was originally named Max in earlier drafts of the script before being finalized. Nickelodeon did not bar Sullivan from using the term "lesbian" in the dialogue while writing the script for the episode, but he said that "we just can't say those words because of how young our audience can skew, but the joy of the episode, that I was proud of, was that it wasn't a 'coming out' episode. The entire family accepted her, there was no having to come out." Sullivan has stated that the ending of the episode is his favorite moment from any series that he has ever worked on.

== Release and reception ==
"L is for Love" garnered 1.89 million viewers upon its initial premiere, a slight uptick from the 1.81 million viewers that the previous episode, "Potty Mouth", garnered when it first aired.

The initial airing of the episode sparked a theory among fans that Luna is bisexual due to a previous episode, "Study Muffin", depicting her as attracted to a young man named Hugh. However, Sullivan, who heavily implied that Luna had initially been conceived as a lesbian, responded by saying that he refused to push LGBTQ-specific terminology into the dialogue because Luna has become representative of many young people who were struggling with their identity. With Luna not having an explicit label mentioned in the episode's dialogue, other viewers have simply refused to definitively label her as bisexual or lesbian, regardless of the implications held by this episode and others.

The episode's closing scene where Luna was revealed to be queer was met with highly positive response. The series' crew has considered the overall positive response to Luna and Sam as a couple to be emotional to them. Valerie Anne of AutoStraddle, who is herself queer, praised the episode for how the episode's ending depicted Luna and Sam as a casual pair of same-sex people with crushes on each other, and used Luna's firm establishment as LGBTQ to identify herself as a similar person. For similar reasons, Heather Hogan (also from AutoStraddle) marked the episode as one of the top 30 best episodes of animated programs that deal with LGBTQ themes. Alex Bonilla of Overly Animated marked the episode off as the potential to take the show in a new direction since Luna and Sam were one of the youngest animated fictional LGBTQ couples at the time of airing (with Luna being fifteen years old), citing how most LGBTQ representation in children's media is either relegated to the background or characteristic of a side character (using the series' pre-established Howard and Harold McBride, who are part of the supporting cast, as an example, along with EJ and Sue Randell of Clarence, who are likewise infrequently occurring characters in their series), and if it's visible among the main cast, it's usually done in a subtle manner (such as how Korra and Asami of The Legend of Korra had their homosexual relationship built up slowly over the course of their series) or with the use of fantastical elements (such as how Quartz, Pearl, Ruby, and Sapphire of Steven Universe are all homosexual, but are ultimately not humans.) AJ Frost of Comics Beat has praised the episode for how Luna's LGBTQ orientation was not treated as an issue, further deducing that "Savino was emphatic that the sexuality of the character is less important tha[n] what viewers might think" because the primary focus was placed on Luna slowly becoming more open to expressing her feelings for her crush, rather than potential angst that her orientation may be incompatible with Sam's. Mamaputle Boikanyo of Batswadi used the episode as one of the bases for defining the series as one of several children's animated series that portrays queer relationships in a positive light.

This episode, along with several others featuring Howard and Harold, played a role in the series getting nominated at the 29th GLAAD Media Awards.

=== Controversy ===
The series had previously received backlash for its inclusion of LGBTQ characters back when Howard and Harold McBride were introduced. "L Is for Love", having introduced another homosexual couple to the series, received similar criticism. The episode was skipped on the Central and Eastern European feed of Nickelodeon, which covered a few countries where same-sex relationships are not recognized such as Romania and Serbia, with the network instead opting to premiere its sister episode, "Potty Mouth", alongside "Pets Peeved". The episode was also banned from airing in other countries such as Russia and Malaysia, where homosexuality is criminalized and dissemination and promotion of LGBTQ content to minors is prohibited by law. The episode's initial airing in Turkey caused the entire series to be taken off the air in the country for one year before returning to the air in censored form, with episodes featuring LGBTQ content such as "L Is for Love" being banned on Nickelodeon Turkey. Around the time of the episode's premiere, the entire series had been banned from airing on Nickelodeon Africa due to complaints filed by the Kenya Film Classification Board that the series had been "trying to normalize, glamorize, and even glorify homosexual behavior," which is illegal and punishable by imprisonment in Kenya.

In June 2018, the Ordo Iuris filed a complaint to the Polish National Broadcasting Council that the series' inclusion of LGBTQ characters, particularly Howard and Harold, violates Article 18 of the Polish Constitution, which defines marriage as "a union of a man and a woman" and states that "programs or other messages should respect the religious beliefs of the recipients, and in particular the Christian system of values." "L Is for Love", which had previously premiered in Poland on September 8, 2017, was subsequently banned from reruns on Nickelodeon Poland along with episodes featuring the McBride parents for likewise promoting homosexual themes via its inclusion of Luna's queer crush on Sam.

== Home media ==
The episode was first released as one of the episodes included on the A Very Loud Christmas DVD in the United Kingdom and Australia in 2018. In the series' native United States, it was released on the Relative Chaos DVD, which packages the first half of the second season, in 2019, and later on The Complete Second Season and The Complete Seasons 1, 2 & 3 DVDs in 2021 and 2024, respectively, which both package the entire second season. It was also included on the Chaos familial DVD in France, which compiles the second quarter of the second season, and on the Intégrale de la saison 2 DVD that compiles the entire season, both released in 2019.
