= The Loud House season 1 =

First season of the American animated Nickelodeon series

The Loud House
- Season 1
- DVD cover
- Showrunner: Chris Savino
- Starring: Grant Palmer; Collin Dean; Catherine Taber; Liliana Mumy; Nika Futterman; Cristina Pucelli; Jessica DiCicco; Grey DeLisle; Lara Jill Miller; Caleel Harris; Jill Talley; Brian Stepanek
- No. of episodes: 26 (52 segments; 46 broadcast blocks)

Release
- Original network: Nickelodeon
- Original release: May 2 – November 8, 2016

Season chronology
- Next → Season 2

The first season of The Loud House began airing on May 2, 2016 and contained 26 episodes with two segments each, separated into 46 broadcast blocks.

== Voice cast and characters ==
=== Main voice cast ===
- Grant Palmer as Lincoln Loud (ep. 1-22)
- Collin Dean as Lincoln Loud (ep. 23-26)
- Catherine Taber as Lori Loud, Katherine Mulligan, Girl Jordan, additional voices
- Liliana Mumy as Leni Loud, additional voices
- Nika Futterman as Luna Loud, additional voices
- Cristina Pucelli as Luan Loud, additional voices
- Jessica DiCicco as Lynn Loud Jr., Lucy Loud, Zach Gurdle, additional voices
- Grey DeLisle as Lana Loud, Lola Loud, Lily Loud, Scoots, additional voices
- Lara Jill Miller as Lisa Loud, Liam Hunnicutt, additional voices
- Caleel Harris as Clyde McBride
- Jill Talley as Rita Loud, additional voices
- Brian Stepanek as Lynn Loud Sr., Hunter Spector, Jay Rock, additional voices

=== Recurring cast ===
- Jeff Bennett as Mick Swagger, additional voices
- Susanne Blakeslee as Agnes Johnson
- John DiMaggio as Chester "Chunk" Monk, Flip, Mr. Grouse, Patchy Drizzle, additional voices
- Carlos PenaVega as Bobby Santiago
- Fred Tatasciore as T-Bone, additional voices

=== Guest cast ===
- Pamela Adlon as Tabby (in "Dance, Dance Resolution")
- Sean Astin as Loni Loud (in "One of the Boys")
- Blake Bertrand as Flat Tire (in "Hand-Me-Downer", "Lincoln Loud: Girl Guru")
- Wayne Brady as Harold McBride (in "Overnight Success", "Attention Deficit")
- Kimberly Brooks as Kids (in "Funny Business"), Tween #1 (in "Funny Business")
- Caitlin Carmichael as Cat (in "Lincoln Loud: Girl Guru")
- Tristian Chase as Trent (in "Save the Date")
- Juliocesar Chavez as Lance (in "The Green House")
- Greg Cipes as Luke Loud (in "One of the Boys")
- Trevor Devall as Carnival Manager (in "A Fair to Remember"), Carnival Worker (in "A Fair to Remember"), Teen Carny (in "A Fair to Remember")
- Daniel DiMaggio as Artie Dumbrowski (in "Lincoln Loud: Girl Guru")
- Daniel DiVenere as Chandler McCann (in "The Waiting Game")
- Miles Elliot as Classmate #2 (in "Save the Date")
- Morgan Gingerich as Classmate #3 (in "Save the Date")
- Jay Gragnani as Lance (in "Making the Case")
- Seth Green as Loki Loud (in "One of the Boys")
- Wyatt Griswold as Rusty Spokes (in "Hand-Me-Downer", "Dance, Dance Resolution")
- Jess Harnell as Pucker Uppenheimer (in "For Bros About to Rock"), Sean Gantka Caricature (in "For Bros About to Rock"), Billy's Father (in "Two Boys and a Baby")
- Jacob Hopkins as Andrew (in "Lincoln Loud: Girl Guru")
- Sirena Irwin as Mrs. DiMartino (in "Study Muffin")
- Georgie Kidder as Haiku (in "Dance, Dance Resolution"), Polly Pain (in "Dance, Dance Resolution")
- Matt Kirshen as Hugh (in "Study Muffin")
- Amanda McCann as Giggles (in "Dance, Dance Resolution")
- Michael McDonald as Howard McBride (in "Overnight Success", "Attention Deficit")
- Sydney Mikayla as Joy (in "Lincoln Loud: Girl Guru")
- Hannah Nordberg as Mollie (in "Lincoln Loud: Girl Guru")
- Daran Norris as TV Announcer (in "Making the Case", "Sound of Silence"), Bachelor (in "Making the Case")
- Rob Paulsen as Lane Loud (in "One of the Boys")
- Zoe Pessin as Classmate #1 (in "Making the Case")
- Thomas Robie as Classmate #2 (in "The Green House")
- Alan Ruck as Lord Tetherby (in "Out on a Limo"), Police Officer (in "Out on a Limo")
- Joshua Rush as Classmate #1 (in "Save the Date"), Quarterback (in "The Loudest Yard")
- Jadon Sand as Classmate #4 (in "Save the Date")
- Charlie Schlatter as Dr. Feinstein (in "A Novel Idea"), DJ (in "Dance, Dance Resolution"), Maggie's Dad (in "Funny Business"), Tween #2 (in "Funny Business")
- April Stewart as Bratty Kid's Mom (in "Funny Business")
- Matthew W. Taylor as Donnie Dufresne (in "Toads and Tiaras")
- Mason Vaughan as Papa Wheelie (in "Hand-Me-Downer", "Lincoln Loud: Girl Guru")
- Kari Wahlgren as Maggie (in "Funny Business"), Mom #2 (in "Funny Business"), Kids (in "Funny Business")
- Mateus Ward as Hank (in "The Loudest Yard")
- Fred Willard as Albert "Pop Pop" (in "Cover Girls")
- Gary Anthony Williams as Super Mart Manager (in "Cereal Offender"), Zombie Bran Announcer (in "Cereal Offender")
- Wade Williams as Royal Woods Roosters Coach (in "The Loudest Yard"), Public Address Announcer (in "The Loudest Yard")
- Breanna Yde as Ronnie Anne Santiago (in "Save the Date", "April Fools Rules", "Dance, Dance Resolution")
- Wilber Zaldivar as Hawk (in "The Loudest Yard")
- Calvin Zwicker as Bratty Kid (in "Cereal Offender"), Zombie Kid (in "Cereal Offender")

== Episode list ==
Every episode and segment of this season was directed by Chris Savino, with him co-directing with Kyle Marshall in the episode "The Price of Admission"/"One Flu Over the Loud House" (#125).

No. overall	No. in season	Title	Written by	Storyboarded by	Original release date	Prod. code	U.S. viewers (millions)
1	1	"Left in the Dark"	Story by : Chris Savino & Karla Sakas Shropshire; Teleplay by : Chris Savino	Chris Savino	May 2, 2016 (Note: This episode was shown before its official television premiere at San Diego Comic-Con on July 11, 2015. The episode was also screened at a television festival on February 5, 2016.)	101	2.07
1	1	"Get the Message"	Alec Schwimmer	Kyle Marshall	May 2, 2016	101	2.07
Lincoln hears about the live season finale of his favorite television series "ARGGH!" and must distract his sisters so he can watch it, but he could not make it in time. When he plugs in a smaller TV to allow Lucy to watch her favorite show, it leads to a power outage forcing Lincoln to team up with his sisters to venture into the basement to switch the power back on. After getting angry at Lori when she threatened him for trespassing into her room and accidentally breaking his Game Goggles, Lincoln leaves an angry message on Lori's smartphone. He soon regrets it and enlists Clyde to help him get it off her smartphone.
2	2	"Heavy Meddle"	Ava Tramer	Miguel Puga	May 3, 2016	102	1.79
2	2	"Making the Case"	Karla Sakas Shropshire	Darin McGowan	May 3, 2016	102	1.79
Lincoln is being picked on by a bully and does not want his sisters to find out and meddle in his affairs, as they always go overboard. When Lisa finds out and tells Lynn, which leads to the rest of his sisters finding out, Lincoln tries to keep them from getting involved after telling them the bully's identity. Being the only kid without an award, Lincoln plans to enter a viral video contest using Luan's movie equipment. After some unsuccessful filming, Lincoln secretly films and uploads the comical antics of his sisters, which leads to them to be enraged at him when they discover this. Now Lincoln must make another video in order to get the girls to forgive him.
3	3	"Along Came a Sister"	Karla Sakas Shropshire	Jordan Rosato	May 4, 2016	112	1.80
3	3	"Chore and Peace"	Alec Schwimmer	Ed Baker	May 4, 2016	112	1.80
Mrs. Johnson selects Lincoln to watch over the class' pet tarantula Frank. During this time, Lincoln must keep Frank safe from an arachnophobic Leni and an overzealous exterminator. Lincoln's known chore is taking out the trash. He eventually gets sick of it and goes on strike until someone switches with him. This leads to his sisters going on their own strike in return. The strikes continue to the point where Lily is nowhere to be found in the garbage-filled house and a garbage monster named Trashy is born. The Loud siblings must work together to find their youngest sibling.
4	4	"Project Loud House"	Chris Savino & Michael Rubiner	Chris Savino	May 5, 2016	105	1.79
4	4	"In Tents Debate"	Bob Mittenthal	Ed Baker	May 5, 2016	105	1.79
In order to get his project to school on time, Lincoln works to get each of his sisters out the door during their morning routine. The Loud family is planning a vacation and needs a place to go. To avoid the usual camp grounds, the children pitch ideas for Dairyland Amusement Park or Aloha Beach. Lincoln is left with the deciding vote. But tensions rise as the day progresses and the debate turns into a war quickly.
5	5	"The Sweet Spot"	Kevin Sullivan	Kyle Marshall	May 6, 2016	104	1.74
5	5	"A Tale of Two Tables"	Michael Rubiner	Darin McGowan	May 6, 2016	104	1.74
The Loud family's car Vanzilla is known for its bad seats, except for its good one called the "Sweet Spot." Lincoln makes plans to obtain the "Sweet Spot" and seating arrangements for his sisters by tomorrow's road trip without them finding out about the "Sweet Spot." Lincoln becomes tired of the antics at the children's table where he sits with Lucy, Lana, Lola, Lisa, and Lily. So he makes plans to prove himself worthy enough to be promoted to the grownup table by being responsible, and he gets some help from Clyde. But once he "earns" his spot at the table, he immediately misses the food at the kids table.
6	6	"Driving Miss Hazy"	Karla Sakas Shropshire	Jordan Rosato	May 9, 2016	103A	1.74
Lincoln and his siblings have gotten tired of doing favors for Lori in exchange for her driving them to places. To remedy this, they decide to teach Leni how to drive. Lori is against this and plans to sabotage Leni without knowledge that she will injure her too.
7	7	"No Guts, No Glori"	Haley Mancini	Miguel Puga	May 10, 2016	103B	1.85
As the Loud parents go out for their anniversary dinner, Lori is left in charge of the house, where she enforces strict rules that her fellow siblings have to follow. Fed up with this, Lincoln leads a revolt against Lori with disastrous results. But when the siblings decide to put Lincoln in charge instead of Lori, things go from chaotic to out of control.
8	8	"Picture Perfect"	Scott Kreamer	Ed Baker	May 11, 2016	107A	1.87
As an anniversary gift for his parents, Lincoln plans to have himself and his sisters photographed for a family picture and tries to get his sisters to look their best for the picture. But even doing a perfect picture leads to chaotic problems.
9	9	"Undie Pressure"	Alec Schwimmer	Violaine Briat	May 12, 2016	107B	1.77
During a rainy day, Lola is annoyed that Lincoln reads his comic books in his underwear. This leads to a wager to how long each sibling can go without displaying their bad habits. If Lincoln wins, then the girls have to stop complaining about his habits and buy him new underwear. But if the girls win, then Lincoln has to stop his annoying habits forever.
10	10	"Linc or Swim"	Karla Sakas Shropshire	Jordan Rosato	May 13, 2016	108A	1.84
Due to the Loud siblings being suspended from every pool for various things like chicken fights during senior swim, making the swimming pool like chicken soup, and Lily's fecal matter, Lincoln decides to obtain an inflatable pool for himself to do cannonballs in and he tries to keep his sisters from ruining it when they learn about it.
11	11	"Hand-Me-Downer"	Michael Rubiner	Ed Baker	May 16, 2016	110A	1.86
Lincoln gets a hand-me-down bike from Lori. In order to impress Poppa Wheelie's gang, Lincoln and Clyde borrow Lynn's bike without her knowledge. When the bike ends up stolen, the two must find and return it before Lynn finds out.
12	12	"Sleuth or Consequences"	Whitney Wetta & Sammie Crowley	Kyle Marshall	May 17, 2016	110B	1.65
Someone has clogged the toilet and Lincoln is the main suspect. He works with Lucy in order to find out who clogged the toilet. But little does Lincoln know that the person who clogged the toilet may be closer than he thinks.
13	13	"Changing the Baby"	Alec Schwimmer	Violaine Briat	May 18, 2016	108B	1.65
As he does not have any common interests with his sisters, Lincoln decides to shape Lily into his own image which leads to his sisters competing with him and each other for Lily's attention. Meanwhile, Clyde gets jealous at Lincoln spending time with Lily and tries to get his attention.
14	14	"Sound of Silence"	Michael Rubiner	Jordan Rosato	May 19, 2016	106A	1.79
Due to the noisy antics of his sisters, Lincoln orders a pair of earphones in order to block out their racket. But when Lincoln finds out that he unwittingly promised Lola to help her out with something that is not mentioned, Lincoln must find out what it is.
15	15	"Space Invader"	Story by : Chris Savino & Karla Sakas Shropshire; Teleplay by : Chris Savino	Chris Savino	May 20, 2016	106B	1.75
When Lynn and Lucy get into an argument, Lincoln allows Lynn to bunk with him. When Lynn starts to overstay her welcome, Lincoln must work to get her and Lucy to settle their dispute.
16	16	"For Bros About to Rock"	Alec Schwimmer	Darin McGowan	June 6, 2016	113A	1.82
Lincoln and Clyde are looking forward to their first concert where their favorite glam rock band SMOOCH will be performing. Luna runs into them, but Lincoln becomes worried that Luna will ruin their first concert experience like she has done with his other sisters.
17	17	"Ties That Bind"	Karla Sakas Shropshire	Miguel Puga	June 7, 2016	109B	1.85
Lincoln overhears his parents from the bathroom that they are discussing on which of the 11 he wants to throw out. Thinking that they want to get rid of them, Lincoln and his sisters work on improving their ways after causing chaos in the house. What the kids do not know is that their parents are actually talking about which ties that Mr. Loud should get rid of.
18	18	"The Green House"	Bob Mittenthal	Miguel Puga	June 8, 2016	111B	1.88
Lincoln helps his siblings do things that will make their ways environmentally friendly in order to not be labeled an outcast for making his class lose an environmentally-centered challenge due to his family's excessive resource usage. Soon, Lincoln has to do his part when his friends wish to use his house to play video games.
19	19	"Butterfly Effect"	Kevin Sullivan	Violaine Briat	June 9, 2016	111A	1.94
After a yo-yo trick he was showing off goes wrong, Lincoln discovers that it smashed and spilled Lisa's chemicals. Afraid of Lisa's reaction, Lincoln does not tell her against Charles' suggestion which sets off a chain reaction of events that unravels the entire household.
20	20	"It's a Loud, Loud, Loud, Loud House"	Chris Savino	Kyle Marshall	June 10, 2016	113B	1.70
Mr. Loud punishes his children for fighting over a quarter by forcing them to clean the attic. While cleaning, Lincoln comes across a letter containing clues of money left behind by the house's previous owner Sharon DeMonet, which leads to a competitive treasure hunt between him and his sisters.
21	21	"House Music"	Kevin Sullivan	Violaine Briat	July 18, 2016	117A	1.94
Luna takes lead of her siblings in order to compete at the talent show at Royal Woods' Family Fun Fair. When she hears from her roadie Chunk that famous rock star Mick Swagger will be there, Luna pushes her siblings to perfect their music as a way to impress him even though she tells them music is all about fun.
22	22	"Two Boys and a Baby"	Karla Sakas Shropshire	Jordan Koch	July 19, 2016	114B	2.28
While everyone else is visiting Mrs. Loud's Aunt Ruth, Lincoln and Clyde watch over Lily as they work to take care of her until the rest of the Loud family returns.
23	23	"Overnight Success"	Kevin Sullivan	Darin McGowan	July 20, 2016	109A	2.15
After some persuasion to his father who had previously banned sleepovers due to past incidents caused by Lynn's sports accident, Leni's power outage, and Luna and their friends trashing the house with Chunk kicking Mr. Loud out of his own home, Lincoln has his first sleepover with Clyde. However, he becomes jealous when his sisters repeatedly try to make use of Clyde with their own antics.
24	24	"Toads and Tiaras"	Whitney Wetta & Sammie Crowley	Violaine Briat	July 21, 2016	114A	1.95
After Lola gets injured while rehearsing for an upcoming pageant hosted by Donnie Dufresne, Lincoln trains Lana to take her place so that they can win tickets to Dairyland Amusement Park. But things get out of hand when Lincoln pushes Lana too much while trying to get her to act like a normal, girly girl. Even worse, Lola eventually finds out and makes her way towards the pageant on crutches.
25	25	"A Novel Idea"	Alec Schwimmer	Jordan Koch	July 22, 2016	117B	1.80
While his sisters go with his father to "Take Your Daughter to Work Day," Lincoln is brought by his mother Rita to her work at the dental office. While Rita helps her boss Dr. Feinstein, Lincoln ends up losing Rita's manuscript. He must recover it before she is done with work.
26	26	"Cover Girls"	Sheela Shrinivas	Miguel Puga	August 1, 2016	115A	2.16
On the day of Spring Cleaning, Lincoln is asked by his sisters to cover for them while they do some activities that came up. When a web chat with the Loud siblings' grandfather Pop-Pop is requested, Lincoln must work to get his sisters back to the house.
27	27	"Out on a Limo"	Alec Schwimmer	Kyle Marshall	August 2, 2016	116B	2.21
Lincoln wins a limousine ride, but his personality changes upon becoming friends with the snobbish Lord Tetherby (Alan Ruck) causing him to forget a promise to his sisters.
28	28	"Attention Deficit"	Kevin Sullivan	Darin McGowan	August 3, 2016	116A	2.00
Lincoln is unable to get his parents to help him with his volcano project as they are busy helping each of his sisters. When he spends the day at Clyde's house, where Clyde's two dads Howard and Harold help him out, Lincoln has trouble keeping his sisters' visit to the McBride residence to a minimum when they hear about it.
29	29	"Save the Date"	Karla Sakas Shropshire	Jordan Rosato	August 4, 2016	115B	1.99
After Lincoln insults Ronnie Anne Santiago while talking to his friends and unaware that she was listening, her brother Bobby breaks up with Lori. In order to remedy this, Lori drags Lincoln on a double-date to Jean Juan's French Mex restaurant. When Lincoln's friends see him there, he works to keep himself from being seen with Ronnie Anne.
30	30	"Come Sale Away"	Story by : Greg Grabianski; Teleplay by : Sheela Shrinivas	Kyle Marshall	September 12, 2016	119B	1.66
The Loud children hold a garage sale to see who can sell the most things. But when it appears that Lily's blanket has been accidentally sold, the Loud children must band together, find out who they sold it to, and get it back.
31	31	"Lincoln Loud: Girl Guru"	Whitney Wetta & Sammie Crowley	Darin McGowan	September 13, 2016	119A	1.64
During Royal Woods Elementary School's business fair, Lincoln and Clyde hold a guru stand to raise money, where Lincoln decides to use his wisdom of living with his sisters to help those who wish to impress girls. Unfortunately, Lincoln's advice to some male students and the gym teacher Coach Pacowski go horribly awry.
32	32	"Roughin' It"	Karla Sakas Shropshire	Jordan Koch	September 14, 2016	120A	1.52
Feeling that he has lost his masculinity from hanging out with his sisters so much and watching "The Dream Boat" with them, Lincoln decides to get his manliness back by go camping with Clyde near the North Valley Bed and Breakfast where Howard and Harold McBride are staying. During this camping, the boys get lost in the wild. Now Lincoln must use what he learned from his sisters to get himself and Clyde back safely.
33	33	"The Waiting Game"	Kevin Sullivan	Violaine Briat	September 15, 2016	120B	1.70
Wanting to obtain birthday party invitations from a popular kid named Chandler McCann, Lincoln and Clyde take advantage of Lori's employee benefits at Gus's Games and Grub to give Chandler free stuff, jeopardizing Lori's plans for her school's dance.
34	34	"The Loudest Yard"	Bob Mittenthal	Miguel Puga	September 16, 2016	121A	1.76
Rita wants Lincoln to be more active, so she signs him up to play for the Royal Woods Roosters football team overseen by an unnamed coach (Wade Williams) after every attempt to make him exercise fails. Upon Lola failing to give Lincoln an injury, Lynn Jr. trains Lincoln in football. When that ends up disastrous, Lincoln has Lynn take his place on the team until it comes to the Hazeltucky Hockers that have Hank and Hawk on it.
35	35	"Dance, Dance Resolution"	Story by : Amaris Cavin; Teleplay by : Alec Schwimmer	Violaine Briat	September 19, 2016	122A	1.67
Lincoln tries to avoid Ronnie Anne so she will not ask him to Royal Woods Elementary's Sadie Hawkins dance as he already has plans, and then lies about it to his sisters. This leads Luna, Luan, Lynn, and Lucy to accidentally land Lincoln four dates for it. The girls that get hooked up with Lincoln are Lucy's friend Haiku, Lynn's roller derby teammate Polly Pain, Luan's clown school friend Giggles, and Luna's friend Tabby. Now Lincoln must balance between being each girl and avoid Ronnie Anne.
36	36	"A Fair to Remember"	Kevin Sullivan	Darin McGowan	September 20, 2016	122B	1.73
Lori gets jealous when Bobby begins to excessively hang out with Lincoln. At the suggestion of Lucy, Lori hangs out with Clyde at the local carnival to make Lincoln and Bobby jealous.
37	37	"A Tattler's Tale"	Sammie Crowley & Whitney Wetta	Jordan Koch	September 21, 2016	123B	1.82
As revenge for not being allowed to join her siblings' Secret Secrets Club due to her tattletale tendencies, Lola bugs their meeting, learns about their secrets, and uses them to her advantage. This leads to Lincoln and the rest of the sisters to try to find a secret to use against Lola.
38	38	"Homespun"	Karla Sakas Shropshire	Jordan Koch	September 22, 2016	126B	1.92
Lincoln and his sisters have become fed up with the various issues in their house (e.g., broken door handles, backed-up pipes, water leaks, creaky floors, rotting wood, thin walls, and opossums chewing the wires of their house). During a tornado watch for Royal Woods, the Loud children end up taking shelter in the basement, where they reminisce all the good and bad times that happened with their house and its issues.
39	39	"April Fools' Rules"	Sammie Crowley & Whitney Wetta	Miguel Puga	September 23, 2016	118A	1.95
On April Fools' Day, Luan's pranking is at its all-time high, causing Lincoln, his other sisters, his parents, and Clyde to do all they can to try to avoid Luan's pranks. When Lincoln learns that Ronnie Anne is coming over, he is forced to set off all of Luan's pranks before Ronnie Anne arrives.
40	40	"The Price of Admission"	Sheela Shrinivas	Kyle Marshall	October 15, 2016	125	1.82
40	40	"One Flu Over the Loud House"	Alec Schwimmer	Kyle Marshall	October 15, 2016	125	1.82
Against his parents' orders, Lincoln sees a scary movie called The Harvester and regrets it when he has a hard time sleeping out of fear. He mistakes for Mr. Grouse's night activities for things that occurred in the movie. A flu outbreak occurs in the Loud House, causing those affected by it to act like zombies. Lincoln and his surviving sisters must find a way to avoid getting infected while trying to get out of the house and get to Clyde's "Safe Haven."
41	41	"One of the Boys"	Kevin Sullivan	Jordan Rosato	October 17, 2016	123A	1.72
After getting tired of his sisters' antics, Lincoln wonders what life would be like if he had brothers. Lisa's new watch invention takes Lincoln to a genderbender reality, and he adapts to it at first – until he learns the downsides of having brothers like Loki (Seth Green), Loni (Sean Astin), Luke (Greg Cipes), Lane (Rob Paulsen), Boy Lynn, Lars, Leif, Lexx, Levi, and Leon, forcing him to try to return to his own reality before the deadline of his time there expires.
42	42	"Cereal Offender"	Karla Sakas Shropshire	Jordan Rosato	October 18, 2016	118B	1.72
A new zombie-themed cereal called Zombie Bran has gone on sale. In order to obtain it, Lincoln volunteers to get his mother's shopping on the required budget done and brings his sisters along. Lincoln must work to keep the money to the amount enough to still purchase Zombie Bran, keep his sisters' antics from being discovered by the aggressive store manager (Gary Anthony Williams) who aims to kick troublemakers out of the store, and compete with a mischievous child to get to the Zombie Bran cereal.
43	43	"Raw Deal"	Karla Sakas Shropshire	Jordan Rosato	October 19, 2016	121B	1.72
As the Loud family heads to Grand Venture State Park, Lincoln becomes a nervous wreck when Lucy predicts his day will end in tragedy with her fortune-telling cards and so Lincoln skips all the fun by trying not to end up in danger. Meanwhile, Lisa disbelieves Lucy's fortune until an egg containing an owl with deer antlers falls in front of her and she has the park ranger arrange a press conference.
44	44	"Study Muffin"	Michael Rubiner	Violaine Briat	October 20, 2016	126A	1.84
In preparation for an upcoming test and to avoid getting a failing grade as of being late, Lincoln gets a tutor named Hugh (Matt Kirshen) to tutor him when Lisa is unable to. Hugh's handsome appearance ends up causing Lincoln's sisters (except Lily), his father, and the Loud pets to be attracted to him, which affects Lincoln's studies. But little does anyone know, there is a surprising reason why Lincoln keeps failing his tests.
45	45	"Funny Business"	Karla Sakas Shropshire	Miguel Puga	November 7, 2016	124A	2.00
As part of her birthday party business called Funny Business Inc., Luan hires Lincoln to be her birthday clown assistant. Lincoln's antics soon become popular and cause him to hog the spotlight, putting a rift between him and Luan. When Lincoln's latest job is at a birthday party attended by emo kids and none of them fall for his funny tricks, he must make up with Luan in order to entertain them.
46	46	"Snow Bored"	Whitney Wetta & Sammie Crowley	Darin McGowan	November 8, 2016	124B	1.73
A snow day hits Royal Woods, leading to all the schools closing. As Lisa is against snow days and wishes to end the current one to resume school, her siblings try various snow day events to impress Lisa. When she ends up in a snowball fight with her siblings, she gets hooked on them and uses her connections in NASA to seed the clouds to get more snow.

== DVD release ==
The season was originally released across two DVD volumes, each containing one half of the season. The first volume, Welcome to the Loud House, packaged the first half of the season and was released by Paramount Home Entertainment and Nickelodeon in the United States on May 23, 2017, about half a year after the season completed its broadcast on television. The second volume, It Gets Louder, packaged the second half of the season and was released a year later on May 22, 2018. Both volumes were later packaged into a single DVD box set that compiles the entire season, titled The Complete First Season, which was released on October 19, 2021. In 2024, the entire season was packaged on the The Loud House: The Complete Seasons 1, 2 & 3 DVD, alongside all episodes from the following two seasons. The season also received a complete packaged release in France, split into four volumes that cover each quarter of the season, released by Citel Video on December 5, 2018.

The Loud House: The Complete First Season
Region 1 (United States)	Region 2 (France)
Set details
26 episodes (2 volumes); 4-disc set (2 discs per volume); NTSC format; 16:9 aspect ratio; Languages: English (Dolby Digital 5.1); Spanish (Dolby Stereo); French (Dolby Stereo)	26 episodes (4 volumes); 4-disc set; PAL format; 1.78:1 aspect ratio; Languages: French (Dolby Digital 2.0); English (Dolby Digital 2.0)
Release date
October 19, 2021	December 5, 2018
