= L is for Love (disambiguation) =

"L Is for Love" is an episode of the animated TV series The Loud House.

L Is for Love may also refer to:

- "L Is for Love", a 2009 song by El Perro del Mar off the album Love Is Not Pop
- "L: Is for Love", an episode of the 1980s TV show The Candy Store; see The Gospel Bill Show
- " 'L' Is for LOVE", a chapter of the 1978 documentary film The ABC of Love and Sex: Australia Style

== See also ==
- L for Love, a Polish TV soap opera
- Bangalore Days, a 2014 Indian film that had the working title L for Love
- Love (disambiguation)
- L (disambiguation)
