= Griffon the Brush Off =

- My Little Pony: Friendship Is Magic episode
- Gilda (center, flying) loses her temper and blames Pinkie Pie for setting up "weak little party pranks".
- Episode no.: Season 1 Episode 5
- Directed by: Jayson Thiessen; James Wootton
- Written by: Cindy Morrow
- Original air date: November 12, 2010
- Running time: 22 minutes

Episode chronology
← Previous "Applebuck Season"	Next → "Boast Busters"
- My Little Pony: Friendship Is Magic season 1

"Griffon the Brush Off" is the fifth episode of the first season of the animated television series My Little Pony: Friendship Is Magic. It originally aired on The Hub on November 12, 2010. The episode was written by Cindy Morrow. In this episode, Pinkie Pie and Rainbow Dash bond over playing pranks, but their friendship is tested when Rainbow Dash's old friend Gilda, a griffon, arrives and begins treating other ponies poorly.

== Plot ==
External videos
- Griffon the Brush Off (full episode) — Official upload of the episode onto YouTube

Pinkie Pie and Rainbow Dash embark on a pranking spree throughout Ponyville and target their other friends with harmless jokes: they paint Applejack's apples with water colors, replace Twilight's quill ink with disappearing ink, and hide sneezing powder in an anonymous bouquet of flowers intended for Rarity. The next morning, Pinkie visits Rainbow's cloud house in Cloudsdale to invite her on another day of pranking but instead meets Gilda, a griffon whom Rainbow introduces as her old friend from Junior Speedster Flight Camp. Rainbow promises that she and Gilda will join Pinkie after a flying session, but when Pinkie attempts to follow them using various means to reach the clouds, Gilda becomes annoyed and secretly tries to foil her efforts. Eventually, Gilda confronts Pinkie directly and tells her to "buzz off", and says that Rainbow doesn't need to hang around with a "dweeb" now that she is in town. When Pinkie seeks advice from Twilight about Gilda's mean behavior, Twilight dismisses her concerns as jealousy and suggests that Pinkie should improve her own attitude instead.

Determined to give Gilda the benefit of the doubt, Pinkie observes the griffon's behavior at the market while Rainbow attends to weather duties. She watches Gilda scare Granny Smith, steal an apple from a produce stand, and berate Fluttershy when she accidentally bumps into Gilda while guiding a family of ducks. Fed up with Gilda's meanness, Pinkie decides to solve the problem "Pinkie Pie-style" and throws a welcome party at Sugarcube Corner that appears to honor Gilda but actually features numerous pranks. Gilda falls victim to a hoofshake buzzer, slips on cake during a game of "Pin the Tail on the Pony", and is increasingly irritated as she blames Pinkie for the pranks. Gilda finally loses her temper and tells Rainbow to leave with her, but Rainbow refuses and reveals that she had actually been the one to set up all the pranks for the party. Gilda storms out in anger, and Rainbow apologizes to the party attendees before reconciling with Pinkie through a buzzer-rigged hoofshake of their own.

== Reception ==
Sherilyn Connelly, the author of Ponyville Confidential, gave the episode a "C+" rating and wrote that it was another example of an episode where "outsiders come in to Ponyville, cause trouble, reject the efforts of certain characters to befriend them, and leave without having learned any lessons at all." In her review of the episode in SF Weekly, she wrote, "I appreciate the fact that neither Gilda nor Trixie change their ways at the ends of their respective episodes. That's called life, y'all."

In a critical analysis of the episode, author Jen A. Blue described "Griffon the Brush-Off" as "passable, but not hugely impressive," characterizing it as writer Cindy Morrow's first episode for the series and noting that Morrow was "reliably mediocre" compared to other writers. Blue's analysis focused on reading the episode through the lens of "Geek Social Fallacies", an essay written by Michael Suileabhain-Wilson that identified five common false beliefs about friendship that create problems in geek communities. Calling Equestria "geekery incarnate", Blue wrote that the interactions between Pinkie Pie, Rainbow Dash, and Gilda demonstrate Suileabhain-Wilson's fallacies in action: Pinkie suffers from the belief that friends must do everything together, Rainbow Dash is unable to communicate boundaries due to fallacies about ostracism and acceptance, and Gilda operates under the assumption that friendship is transitive. According to Blue, the episode inadvertently resonated with brony viewers because it referenced geek culture in an episode that was created before the rise of the brony fandom.

== Home media ==
The episode is part of the Season 1 DVD set, released by Shout Factory, on December 4, 2012.

== See also ==
- List of My Little Pony: Friendship Is Magic episodes
