= Trixie (My Little Pony) =

Fictional character from My Little Pony

Trixie Lulamoon
- My Little Pony character
- Trixie Lulamoon as she appears in "No Second Prances"
- First appearance: "Boast Busters" (2010)
- Created by: Chris Savino; Lauren Faust (character design)
- Voiced by: Kathleen Barr

In-universe information
- Full name: Trixie Lulamoon
- Nicknames: The Great and Powerful Trixie
- Species: Unicorn
- Occupation: Traveling magician; Guidance counselor at the School of Friendship
- Affiliation: Starlight Glimmer; School of Friendship (later seasons)
- Family: Jack Pot (father); "Spectacle" or "Showcase" (mother)

Trixie Lulamoon, (Note: The name "Trixie Lulamoon" is used for the human counterpart in the end credits of My Little Pony Equestria Girls: Rainbow Rocks.) self-styled "the Great and Powerful Trixie", is a fictional character who appears in the fourth incarnation of Hasbro's My Little Pony toyline and media franchise, beginning with My Little Pony: Friendship Is Magic (2010–2019). She is voiced by Kathleen Barr.

A boastful and showboating anthropomorphic unicorn magician who travels throughout Equestria performing magic shows, Trixie is initially introduced as an antagonist, whose character evolves over the series to become an ally and eventually a close friend of Starlight Glimmer. She is often seen wearing a large purple hat and cloak. Her cutie mark depicts a wand and a moon.

== Appearances ==
=== Fourth My Little Pony incarnation (2010–2021) ===
==== My Little Pony: Friendship Is Magic ====
A boastful unicorn magician who exaggerates her magical abilities, Trixie refers to herself in the third person, calling herself "The Great and Powerful Trixie". She makes appearances in the show and various spin-offs, beginning as a rival to Twilight Sparkle in "Boast Busters", but becomes more apologetic after seeing the error of her vengefulness in "Magic Duel". She makes recurring appearances starting from "No Second Prances", when she befriends Starlight. In the ninth season, she becomes the School of Friendship's new guidance counselor.

==== My Little Pony: Pony Life ====
In Pony Life, Trixie appears as a supporting character in the episode Friendship Gems. She also appears in a brief flashback in the second season episode Playwright or Wrong.

== Equestria Girls alternate version ==
Trixie's human counterpart appears as an egotistical magician and student at Canterlot High School. Her most prominent appearances include the film My Little Pony: Equestria Girls – Rainbow Rocks, in which she participates the CHS Battle of the Bands as the lead vocalist of her own band, Trixie and the Illusions and is convinced by the Dazzlings to trap the Rainbooms under the stage to take their place in the final round. She also prominently appears in the special My Little Pony: Equestria Girls – Forgotten Friendship, in which she helps Sunset Shimmer find out who is responsible for erasing the school's memories so that the students all hate Sunset.

== Reception and analysis ==
Due to her popularity among fans, Trixie became a recurring character in Season 6 after befriending Starlight Glimmer. Despite her character growth and redemption arc, Trixie retains her signature arrogance and flair for dramatics; the later seasons reveal her insecurities that lie beneath her outwardly confident and braggadocious exterior.

Author Jen A. Blue wrote that Trixie's character has been noted for being an effective foil to Twilight Sparkle. In her analysis of "Magic Duel", Blue examined the episode's relationship to Joseph Campbell's monomyth: She observed that the episode initially follows elements of the hero's journey, but ultimately focuses on Trixie's character development rather than Twilight. Carly Olsen, writing in Screen Rant, ranked Trixie as the tenth most powerful magic user in Friendship Is Magic. She also ranked her pairing with Starlight as the fifth best pairing in the series. Cailyn Szelinski, writing in the same publication, ranked Trixie as the character with the eighth cutest name in Friendship Is Magic.

== In popular culture ==
Trixie appears as an Easter egg in the form of a keychain in the 2014 video game Watch Dogs wearing an outfit similar to the game's protagonist.

Trixie was among the first character voices implemented in 15.ai, a text-to-speech web application that allowed users to generate speech of fictional characters.

== See also ==
- Twilight Sparkle
- Starlight Glimmer
- My Little Pony: Friendship Is Magic fandom
- List of My Little Pony: Friendship Is Magic characters
