= A Dog and Pony Show (My Little Pony: Friendship Is Magic) =

- My Little Pony: Friendship Is Magic episode
- Rarity (center) loudly whines about her working conditions, to the dismay of the Diamond Dogs.
- Episode no.: Season 1 Episode 19
- Directed by: Jayson Thiessen; James Wootton
- Written by: Amy Keating Rogers
- Original air date: March 11, 2011
- Running time: 22 minutes

Episode chronology
← Previous "The Show Stoppers"	Next → "Green Isn't Your Color"
- My Little Pony: Friendship Is Magic season 1

"A Dog and Pony Show" is the nineteenth episode of the first season of the animated television series My Little Pony: Friendship Is Magic. It originally aired on The Hub on March 11, 2011. The episode was written by Amy Keating Rogers. In this episode, Rarity is kidnapped by a pack of Diamond Dogs who want to use her gem-finding abilities, but she turns the tables on her captors through cunning and manipulation rather than force.

== Plot ==
External videos
- A Dog and Pony Show (full episode) — Official upload of the episode onto YouTube

Rarity enlists Spike to help her search for gems needed to complete a large order of dresses. Using her horn's magical ability to detect precious stones, Rarity successfully locates several gems while Spike assists by digging them up. However, they attract the attention of a pack of Diamond Dogs—underground-dwelling canine creatures who live in the tunnel systems beneath Ponyville. The Diamond Dogs emerge from their tunnels and decide to capture Rarity to force her to work for them in their mines. After Rarity is abducted by the Diamond Dogs, Spike races back to town to alert Rarity's friends and get help for a rescue mission.

Meanwhile, underground in the Diamond Dogs' cave system, the Diamond Dogs attempt to force Rarity to use her magic to locate gems for them. She begins to manipulate the Diamond Dogs through a combination of dramatic complaints, demands for better treatment, and exploiting their lack of understanding about proper behavior toward a lady. She complains loudly about the poor conditions, demands to be treated with the respect befitting someone of her refinement, and makes herself such a difficult and high-maintenance captive that the Diamond Dogs begin to cater to her every whim. They reluctantly treat her like royalty, providing her with comfortable accommodations and giving her everything she asks for, all while she continues to find gems.

By the time Spike arrives with Twilight Sparkle, Rainbow Dash, Applejack, Pinkie Pie, and Fluttershy to rescue Rarity, they find the Diamond Dogs exhausted and frustrated by her demanding behavior. They load her up with large quantities of gems and practically beg her to go, unable to tolerate her high-maintenance personality any longer. As the group returns to Ponyville with Rarity's friends helping to transport the substantial cache of gems she acquired, Twilight and Rarity reflect that sometimes intelligence and cunning can be more effective than physical strength when dealing with adversaries.

Just because somepony is ladylike doesn't make her weak. In fact, by using her wits, a seemingly defenseless pony can be the one who outsmarts and outshines them all.

— Twilight Sparkle, "A Dog and Pony Show"

== Development ==
According to the 2009 show bible created by Lauren Faust, the episode was originally called "A Dawg and Pony Show". The "Diamond Dawgs" were described as "burrowing, half prairie dog, half troll creatures [...] dripping with gold chains, rings and earrings" who "talk like gangsta rappers" and have an obsession with "acquiring bling".

== Reception ==
Sherilyn Connelly, the author of Ponyville Confidential, gave the episode an "A+" rating. In her review of the episode in SF Weekly, she wrote, "Twilight tells Rarity that the Shoehorn will be that being ladylike is not the same thing as being weak. Damn, I like that message. And it isn't even blunted by the 'Everybody Laughs' Ending."

In a critical analysis of the episode, author Jen A. Blue offered a starkly contrasting perspective to Connelly's positive assessment, harshly criticizing "A Dog and Pony Show" and calling it "the worst thing Amy Keating Rogers has written for the show to date." Blue wrote that the episode failed to be entertaining, lacked humor and emotional impact, and revealed nothing new about the characters except for introducing what she characterized as "troubling attitudes toward women" in Spike's behavior. She described the episode as "spectacularly unoriginal and cliché," tracing its premise to numerous sources including O. Henry's "The Ransom of Red Chief" and ultimately to Child Ballad 278, "The Farmer's Curst Wife", which she argued had misogynistic origins. Blue criticized the episode's moral message about being "ladylike," arguing that the term was "inherently prescriptive" and reinforced traditional gender expectations that the show otherwise sought to subvert. She also took issue with Spike's portrayal, describing his fantasy of rescuing Rarity and being rewarded with a kiss as evidence of "Nice Guy Syndrome" and a "transactional model" of romance that denied Rarity's autonomy. Blue concluded that the episode perpetuated "toxic gender roles" and represented a failure to critically examine cultural attitudes about femininity and relationships.

== Home media ==
The episode is part of the Season 1 DVD set, released by Shout Factory, on December 4, 2012.

== See also ==
- List of My Little Pony: Friendship Is Magic episodes
