= The Show Stoppers =

- My Little Pony: Friendship Is Magic episode
- The Cutie Mark Crusaders perform an overdramatic rock song at their school talent show.
- Episode no.: Season 1 Episode 18
- Directed by: Jayson Thiessen; James Wootton
- Written by: Cindy Morrow
- Original air date: March 4, 2011
- Running time: 22 minutes

Episode chronology
| ← Previous "Stare Master" | Next → "A Dog and Pony Show" |
- My Little Pony: Friendship Is Magic season 1

"The Show Stoppers" is the eighteenth episode of the first season of the animated television series My Little Pony: Friendship Is Magic. It originally aired on The Hub on March 4, 2011. The episode was written by Cindy Morrow. In this episode, the Cutie Mark Crusaders attempt to earn their cutie marks by entering a school talent competition, but their efforts are complicated when each member insists on doing something they are not skilled at.

== Plot ==
External videos
- The Show Stoppers (full episode) — Official upload of the episode onto YouTube

Applejack leads the Cutie Mark Crusaders to her childhood clubhouse at Sweet Apple Acres and offers it for their use in their ongoing quest to earn their cutie marks. After Apple Bloom renovates the clubhouse, the three fillies announce their resolve to do whatever it takes to discover their special talents. Following a rough map that Scootaloo has drawn, the Crusaders embark on a series of talent-finding activities around Ponyville, including feeding pigs at Sweet Apple Acres, making taffy at Sugarcube Corner, styling hair at Rarity's boutique, attempting extrasensory perception with cards, and even scuba diving. However, none of these attempts succeed.

Twilight Sparkle and Cheerilee find the Crusaders atop a large pile of books after an unsuccessful attempt to become librarians, and Twilight advises them to focus on things they already enjoy doing rather than trying unfamiliar activities. Cheerilee suggests that they enter the upcoming school talent show. Excited about performing as a group, the Crusaders decide to create a dramatic musical number for the talent show.

Sweetie Belle, who wants to design like her sister Rarity, takes on producing costumes and scenery despite her lack of experience. Scootaloo decides to sing a rock ballad even though she struggles with the vocals, and Apple Bloom applies her knowledge of kung fu to create choreography that doesn't suit the performance. When Applejack comes by to check on their practice session, she is dismayed by what she sees, but the girls misinterpret her reaction as amazement.

The night of the talent show, the Cutie Mark Crusaders take the stage and perform their overdramatic rock song complete with painted scenery and special effects. Various accidents occur throughout their performance, and the act ends when all their props collapse on top of them. The crowd breaks into laughter, which initially disappoints the girls until Cheerilee announces that they have won the award for the best comedy act. Despite this, the Crusaders discover they still have not earned their cutie marks; they conclude that their true talent must be comedy.

== Reception ==
Sherilyn Connelly, the author of Ponyville Confidential, gave the episode an "A" rating. In her review of the episode in SF Weekly, Connelly wrote that the Cutie Mark Crusaders should have learned not to force themselves into activities that weren't right for them, while also lamenting that the Crusaders had not performed again as of the second season.

In a critical analysis of the episode, author Jen A. Blue described "The Show Stoppers" as "reliably mediocre", which Blue pointed out was the topic of the episode (and thus serves as meta-commentary). Blue wrote that the episode's focus on the Cutie Mark Crusaders being mediocre at their chosen activities makes sense from a story-telling perspective since they have not yet discovered their true talents, but creates difficulties in crafting engaging television. She pointed out that this episode was the first since the series premiere not to conclude with a friendship lesson, commenting that the Cutie Mark Crusaders learn nothing from their experience and remain in what she called "a state of innocence" that prevents growth. Blue analyzed the episode's musical number as a pastiche of 1980s rock ballads that recalls the villainous group The Misfits from the animated series Jem, ascribing this to what she saw as writer Cindy Morrow's nostalgia for 1970s and 1980s animation. Blue used this episode to discuss the dangers of nostalgic viewing: while escapist entertainment has value, it becomes problematic when viewers become trapped in nostalgia for childhood innocence rather than applying adult experience to create positive change in the real world.

Tara Rittler of TulsaKids praised the episode's moral lessons, describing them as "even more compelling" than those in earlier Cutie Mark Crusaders episodes. Rittler wrote that while it was obvious to the audience which talents each Crusader possessed—Scootaloo's scooter riding, Sweetie Belle's musical abilities, and Apple Bloom's construction skills—the characters failed to recognize their own strengths and instead chose roles that did not suit them. She pinpointed two key lessons from the episode: that "what you are good at and what you want to be good at may not always be the same thing" and that individuals "shouldn't discount your passion just because it doesn't seem 'special' enough," as it may be "such an integral part of who you are that you just can't recognize it."

== Home media ==
The episode is part of the Season 1 DVD set, released by Shout Factory, on December 4, 2012.

== See also ==
- List of My Little Pony: Friendship Is Magic episodes
