= Applebuck Season =

- My Little Pony: Friendship Is Magic episode
- Applejack (right) and Big McIntosh (left) survey a vast apple crop ready to be harvested.
- Episode no.: Season 1 Episode 4
- Directed by: Jayson Thiessen; James Wootton
- Written by: Amy Keating Rogers
- Original air date: November 5, 2010
- Running time: 22 minutes

Episode chronology
← Previous "The Ticket Master"	Next → "Griffon the Brush Off"
- My Little Pony: Friendship Is Magic season 1

"Applebuck Season" is the fourth episode of the first season of the animated television series My Little Pony: Friendship Is Magic. It originally aired on The Hub on November 5, 2010. The episode was written by Amy Keating Rogers. In this episode, Applejack stubbornly insists on harvesting all the apples at Sweet Apple Acres by herself when her brother Big McIntosh is injured, which causes chaos around Ponyville when she tries to help with other tasks while sleep-deprived.

== Plot ==
External videos
- Applebuck Season (full episode) — Official upload of the episode onto YouTube

At Sweet Apple Acres, Applejack and Big McIntosh survey a vast apple crop ready to be harvested, but with Big McIntosh injured, Applejack is determined to perform the entire harvest by herself despite her brother's warnings that the task is too much for one pony. While preparing for the work, she spots a herd of stampeding cows heading toward Ponyville and manages to divert them with help from her dog Winona, which earns her the Prize Pony of Ponyville Award. At the ceremony, a visibly exhausted Applejack stumbles onstage to accept the trophy before dragging it home, and Twilight becomes concerned about her friend's condition when she visits the farm and offers help that Applejack stubbornly refuses.

Applejack's sleep deprivation and exhaustion causes problems throughout Ponyville as she attempts to fulfill various commitments to her friends. She arrives late to help Rainbow Dash with a seesaw catapult stunt and misses her target due to fatigue, then finally lands accurately but sends an unprepared Rainbow hurtling across town. Later, Applejack goes to Sugarcube Corner to help Pinkie Pie bake muffins while Mr. and Mrs. Cake are away. Struggling to stay awake, she misinterprets the recipe instructions and creates batter with potato chips, soda, lemon juice, and earthworms instead of the correct ingredients. The contaminated muffins make dozens of ponies sick and require emergency medical treatment.

Applejack meets Fluttershy in the forest to help round up baby bunnies for a census count, but her irritability from lack of sleep causes her to ignore Fluttershy's instructions. She roughly corners the frightened bunnies and causes them to panic and stampede into Ponyville, which creates chaos throughout the town. Twilight finally confronts Applejack at the orchard and lists all the problems caused by her stubbornness. Applejack claims to have completed the harvest by herself, but Big McIntosh points out that only part of the orchard has been harvested. Applejack faints from shock and exhaustion, and when she regains consciousness, she finally agrees to accept help from her friends, allowing the harvest to proceed much more efficiently than before.

== Reception ==
Sherilyn Connelly, the author of Ponyville Confidential, gave the episode a "C" rating and wrote that, like "The Last Roundup", the episode is "mostly just a series of gags relating to Applejack's stubborn pride before slamming to a close at the end of the second act."

In a critical analysis of the episode, author Jen A. Blue described "Applebuck Season" as the first instance of what she termed a "character collapse" story in the series, a structure that would later be mastered by writer Meghan McCarthy in episodes like "Party of One" and "Lesson Zero". Blue wrote that Applejack presents a particular challenge as a character because she functions as the "classic straight (wo)man" with traits that are "perfectly good" but "not particularly funny, exciting, or dramatic to watch." She praised the episode for making Applejack interesting by having her "fall apart," noting that "the sturdiest, most reliable, most staid and boring pony is the funniest to watch stumbling around in a daze." Blue analyzed the character collapse structure as a method of stripping away layers of a character's persona to reveal core traits, writing that "as the layers of the character's persona burn away, those which are most integral, the ones closest to the core self, are the last to ablate away." According to Blue, the other characters' different reactions to Applejack's breakdown—Twilight's worry, Fluttershy's concern about clumsiness, Rarity's focus on appearance, and Rainbow Dash's attention to exhaustion—revealed truths about their own personalities. Blue wrote that the episode's climax, the discovery that Applejack had only harvested a fraction of the apples, was the demolition of her core trait of keeping promises, which allowed for her character to be "rebuilt with a fresh understanding of who they are."

Tara Rittler of TulsaKids praised the episode's moral lessons, describing them as relatable to both children and adults. She wrote that Applejack refuses assistance from her friends because she is "too proud to admit that maybe she's taken on more than she can handle." Rittler identified the episode's central lesson as teaching viewers to "learn to say 'no' and realize that you can't always do everything by yourself", a situation "that adults may find familiar."

Kieran Hair, writing in WhatCulture, offered a contrarian interpretation of the episode's moral lessons, claiming that it teaches that "self-sufficiency is for suckers." Hair contended that Applejack's exhaustion stemmed not from harvesting apples alone, but rather from helping her friends with mundane tasks that anyone could have helped her with. He argued that Applejack "could have served as a model of self-efficacy and determination" if her friends had been more self-sufficient, but instead "became infected by her friends' over-reliance and lazy refusal to manage their own affairs."

== Home media ==
The episode is part of the Season 1 DVD set, released by Shout Factory, on December 4, 2012.

== See also ==
- List of My Little Pony: Friendship Is Magic episodes
