= Boast Busters =

- My Little Pony: Friendship Is Magic episode
- The Great and Powerful Trixie (center) performs her magic show on stage in Ponyville.
- Episode no.: Season 1 Episode 6
- Directed by: Jayson Thiessen; James Wootton
- Written by: Chris Savino
- Original air date: November 19, 2010
- Running time: 22 minutes

Episode chronology
← Previous "Griffon the Brush Off"	Next → "Dragonshy"
- My Little Pony: Friendship Is Magic season 1

"Boast Busters" is the sixth episode of the first season of the animated television series My Little Pony: Friendship Is Magic. It originally aired on The Hub on November 19, 2010. The episode was written by creator Chris Savino. In this episode, Twilight Sparkle faces a dilemma when a boastful unicorn magician named Trixie arrives in Ponyville, and Twilight must overcome her fears about revealing her own magical abilities to help her friends and the town.

== Plot ==
External videos
- Boast Busters (full episode) — Official upload of the episode onto YouTube

As Twilight Sparkle and Spike venture outside for a stroll, their conversation is interrupted when Snips and Snails announce that a powerful new unicorn has arrived in Ponyville. The duo joins their friends at the town square to witness "The Great and Powerful Trixie" performing a magic show for the gathered crowd. Trixie boasts that she is the most magical unicorn in all of Equestria and claims that she once saved the town of Hoofington from an ursa major (a gigantic, partially translucent magical bear) by banishing the creature to the Everfree Forest.

Fed up with Trixie's arrogance, Applejack, Rainbow Dash, and Rarity each demonstrate their own talents to challenge the newcomer's claims. Applejack performs an impressive rope trick, Rainbow Dash shows off her aerial acrobatics, and Rarity creates an elegant costume from stage curtains. However, Trixie responds to each display by using her magic to humiliate the three in front of the entire crowd. When Spike urges Twilight to demonstrate her superior magical abilities, Twilight becomes afraid of appearing to show off and quickly makes an excuse to leave the scene.

After the show ends, Snips and Snails pester Trixie for more details about her encounter with the ursa major, but she dismisses them due to exhaustion. When Spike tells the two colts they shouldn't believe Trixie's story unless they witness such a feat themselves, Snips gets an idea that leads him and Snails to venture into the Everfree Forest. They accidentally awaken what they believe to be an ursa major and provoke the massive bear-like creature into chasing them back toward Ponyville. The creature turns out to be an ursa minor—smaller than an ursa major but still enormous and dangerous.

Trixie attempts to stop the rampaging beast but is unable to do so, and admits that she fabricated her story about defeating an ursa major. With the creature threatening the town and its residents, Twilight uses her magic to create a soothing lullaby by blowing wind through cattail reeds, then levitates a water tower and fills it with milk from a nearby barn to feed the creature. After the ursa minor falls asleep, Twilight magically carries it back to its cave in the Everfree Forest. Her friends reassure her that she should be proud of her talents and that using them to help others isn't showing off, while Trixie refuses to acknowledge Twilight's superior abilities and flees town in a cloud of smoke.

== Reception ==
Sherilyn Connelly, the author of Ponyville Confidential, gave the episode a "B-" rating and wrote that it was another example of an episode where "outsiders come in to Ponyville, cause trouble, reject the efforts of certain characters to befriend them, and leave without having learned any lessons at all." In her review of the episode in SF Weekly, she wrote, "I appreciate the fact that neither Gilda nor Trixie change their ways at the ends of their respective episodes. That's called life, y'all."

In a critical analysis of the episode, author Jen A. Blue praised "Boast Busters" as a tour-de-force and declared it "easily the best episode we've looked at so far" in the series. Blue emphasized writer Chris Savino's effective use of visual storytelling, particularly in Trixie's design, who combines the behavior of a stage magician with the visual trappings of a "real wizard" like Tolkien's Gandalf. Blue analyzed Trixie as an excellent foil for Twilight Sparkle: Trixie is "confident and confrontational where Twilight is neurotic and avoidant, a dominance-seeker where Twilight seeks approval, and a liar where Twilight is honest." Blue observed that the episode cleverly uses Spike as the point-of-view character in this episode, which allows viewers to "detach from [Twilight]'s actions and interrogate her character" while avoiding focusing too heavily on Twilight's "crippling self-esteem issues" and fear of tall poppy syndrome—her paradoxical conviction that she must excel to impress Princess Celestia while simultaneously hiding her superiority from other ponies.

Brendan Kachel of flayrah called "Boast Busters" a "pretty terrible episode." He also defended Trixie, as she was a stage performer being heckled by the Mane Six, and "hecklers are considered fair game."

== Home media ==
The episode is part of the Season 1 DVD set, released by Shout Factory, on December 4, 2012.

== See also ==
- List of My Little Pony: Friendship Is Magic episodes
