= Overnight Success (The Loud House) =

- The Loud House episode
- Title card
- Episode no.: Season 1 Episode 23
- Directed by: Chris Savino
- Written by: Kevin Sullivan
- Production code: 109A
- Original air date: July 20, 2016

Episode chronology
← Previous "Two Boys and a Baby"	Next → "Toads and Tiaras"
- The Loud House season 1

"Overnight Success" is the 23rd episode of The Loud House in broadcast order and the first segment of the ninth episode of the first season in production order. It first aired on July 20, 2016 and was directed by series creator Chris Savino and written by Kevin Sullivan. In this episode, Lincoln Loud manages to convince his parents, who banned sleepovers after incidents involving his sisters' owns, to let him have his first sleepover with Clyde McBride, his best friend, only to end up getting jealous, as his sisters repeatedly take Clyde for their own needs.

Nickelodeon promoted the episode by releasing a clip featuring Clyde's parents, Howard and Harold, an interracial gay married couple. The episode was praised for the introduction of Harold and Howard, particularly for the brief use of the characters, their casual presentation, and the episode's lack of focus on their sexual orientation.

== Plot ==
Lincoln Loud is excited, as he finally managed to convince his parents (particularly his father) to let him have a sleepover with his best friend Clyde McBride, as they previously banned sleepovers in their house due to some previous incidents caused due to Lincoln's sisters Lynn, Leni, and Luna. Clyde soon arrives and is dropped off by both his dads, but as soon as Lincoln starts explaining their itinerary, Clyde soon attracts the attention of Lincoln's sisters Lisa, Lola, Lynn, Leni, Lori and Lana who quickly begin to take him to accomplish their own needs, much to Lincoln's annoyance and envy. Desperate to have a sleepover, Lincoln calls all of his other friends. However, they soon end up leaving due to Lincoln's sisters also taking them. Lincoln soon realizes that Clyde, due to being an only child, is the only one capable of putting up his sisters' antics. Lincoln then goes to Clyde's house and apologizes to what thinks it's him, only to discover back home that Clyde actually never left the house, as he fainted every time he watched Lincoln's oldest sister Lori, and that the thing in Clyde's bed was actually his stuffed animals, to whom Clyde's fathers put in his bed as a way of deal with the sleepover. Lincoln apologizes to Clyde, and chooses to ignore the itinerary for the sleepover. As Lincoln, his sisters, and Clyde watch a movie, Clyde soon faints once again due to Lori's presence.

== Reception ==
The episode's scene in which Howard and Harold are introduced was met with a highly positive response by several media. Dan Avery of NewNowNext was particularly pleased by the character's "casual and humorous introduction" as "a breath of fresh air". Similarly, Laura Bradley of Vanity Fair felt that the episode's "casual representation in children's programming" was "a milestone" and that "handles the topic [of same-sex marriage] in exactly the right way". De Elizabeth of Teen Vogue said that "[t]he best part is that the show doesn’t treat these characters any differently, or even introduce them with a heavy asterisk about their marital status". The scene was also met with a positive response on Twitter. One interracial married gay couple in particular with an African-American daughter who was a fan of the series read about the episode before it first aired, but did not inform their daughter because they intended to watch the episode with her. The daughter's immediate response to the reveal of Clyde's fathers was that his family closely resembled their family, and the family sent an e-mail to the episode's writer, Kevin Sullivan, informing him of their positive response to the episode, touching on how the series had accurately portrayed a family like theirs.

== Ratings ==
The episode was watched by 2.15 million viewers when it first aired, a slight drop from the 2.28 million viewers the previous episode "Two Boys and a Baby" garnered when it first aired.

== Home media ==
The episode was originally released on the series' first DVD, Welcome to the Loud House, in 2017, which packages the first half of the first season. It was later re-released on The Complete First Season and The Complete Seasons 1, 2 & 3 DVDs in 2021 and 2024, respectively, which both package the entire first season. The episode was also released on the La Chasse au trésor DVD in France, which compiles the second quarter of the first season, and on the Intégrale de la saison 1 DVD, which compiles the entire first season, both released in 2018.
