= Stare Master =

- My Little Pony: Friendship Is Magic episode
- Fluttershy uses "The Stare" on her chickens.
- Episode no.: Season 1 Episode 17
- Directed by: Jayson Thiessen; James Wootton
- Written by: Chris Savino
- Original air date: February 25, 2011
- Running time: 22 minutes

Episode chronology
← Previous "Sonic Rainboom"	Next → "The Show Stoppers"
- My Little Pony: Friendship Is Magic season 1

"Stare Master" is the seventeenth episode of the first season of the animated television series My Little Pony: Friendship Is Magic. It originally aired on The Hub on February 25, 2011. The episode was written by Chris Savino. In this episode, Fluttershy volunteers to babysit the Cutie Mark Crusaders while Rarity works, but the fillies venture into the dangerous Everfree Forest to rescue an escaped chicken.

== Plot ==
External videos
- Stare Master (full episode) — Official upload of the episode onto YouTube

At the Carousel Boutique, Rarity rushes to complete an order of twenty robes while Sweetie Belle tries to help earn her cutie mark but ends up making a mess. Fluttershy arrives to drop off the well-behaved Opalescence from a grooming appointment. The Cutie Mark Crusaders arrive for a planned sleepover, but when Rarity discovers that Sweetie Belle used the golden silk needed for her order to make capes, she cancels the sleepover. Despite Rarity's warnings that the fillies are difficult to manage, Fluttershy offers to host the sleepover instead.

At her cottage, Fluttershy attempts to supervise the energetic Crusaders who want to adventure in the Everfree Forest, which she forbids due to its dangerous creatures. The fillies proceed to cause chaos by breaking furniture, botching repair attempts, and refusing to play quiet games, and as such they are sent to bed early. When she sings them a lullaby and Sweetie Belle joins in with a loud, energetic version that startles nearby chickens, Fluttershy uses an intense glare called "The Stare" to compel the chickens back to their coop. After Fluttershy tucks them into bed again, the Crusaders notice that one chicken named Elizabeak has escaped into the Everfree Forest and sneak out to find her.

Fluttershy discovers the fillies missing and ventures into the forest to find them, where she encounters Twilight Sparkle turned to stone and realizes a cockatrice is on the loose. She locates the Crusaders just as the cockatrice emerges from a bush and turns Elizabeak to stone with its gaze, causing the fillies to panic when they also discover Twilight's petrified form. Fluttershy confronts the creature face-to-face and counters its petrifying stare with her own intense glare, and demands that it restore both Elizabeak and Twilight to normal.

The cockatrice obeys Fluttershy's command and reverses the petrification, leading the impressed Crusaders to dub her the "Stare Master" for her ability to intimidate even the most dangerous creatures. The next morning, Fluttershy reflects on the importance of not accepting tasks beyond your capabilities, and Rarity struggles unsuccessfully to gather the fillies until they respond immediately to Fluttershy's call.

== Reception ==
Sherilyn Connelly, the author of Ponyville Confidential, gave the episode a "B-" rating. In her review of the episode in SF Weekly, she noted that Fluttershy's lesson that being good with animals does not translate to being good with kids had little to do with Twilight learning about the magic of friendship, but wrote that "the show [hasn't] really been about that for some time—which is a big part of why it's gotten so good."

In a critical analysis of the episode, author Jen A. Blue described "The Stare Master" as structurally interesting for its genre collision between sitcom and horror elements. According to Blue, the episode begins as a typical childcare sitcom plot with Fluttershy overwhelmed by babysitting duties, then shifts into horror movie territory when the Cutie Mark Crusaders venture into the dangerous forest and encounter a cockatrice. She wrote that this represented a postmodern writing technique that acknowledges audience familiarity with genre conventions before subverting expectations. Blue praised the episode's resolution, noting how the two genres solve each other: Fluttershy's "Stare" ability, established as a sitcom cliché of maternal authority, is used to defeat the horror monster, which in turn earns her the respect needed to resolve the babysitting plot. Blue also provided a personal perspective on Fluttershy's character; she compared Fluttershy's social anxiety and animal expertise to her own experience with avoidant personality disorder, and suggested that Fluttershy's ease with animals stems from the same intense monitoring of nonverbal cues that makes social situations with ponies overwhelming for her.

== Home media ==
The episode is part of the Season 1 DVD set, released by Shout Factory, on December 4, 2012.

== See also ==
- List of My Little Pony: Friendship Is Magic episodes
