= Howard and Harold McBride =

Fictional couple in the Nickelodeon series The Loud House

- The Loud House characters
- Howard (left) and Harold (right) with Clyde
- First appearance: "Overnight Success" (2016)
- Created by: Chris Savino; Kevin Sullivan; Darin McGowan
- Voiced by: Michael McDonald (Howard); Wayne Brady (2016–2022; Harold); Khary Payton (2022–present; Harold)
- Portrayed by: Justin Michael Stevenson (Howard, A Loud House Christmas); Stephen Guarino (Howard, The Really Loud House); Marcus Folmar (Harold, A Loud House Christmas); Ray Ford (Harold, The Really Loud House)

In-universe information
- Nicknames: Howie (Howard); Hare-Bear (Harold)
- Race: White (Howard); Black (Harold)
- Gender: Males
- Family: Gayle McBride (Harold's mother; Howard's mother-in-law); May (Harold's maternal grandmother; Howard's grandmother-in-law); Collette (Harold's maternal great-grandmother; Howard's great-grandmother-in-law); Helene (Harold's maternal great-great-great-great grandmother; Howard's great-great-great-great-grandmother-in-law); Brenda (Harold's sister or aunt; Howard's sister-in-law or aunt-in-law); Hap (Harold's sister; Howard's sister-in-law); Hoda (Harold's sister; Howard's sister-in-law)
- Spouse: Each-other
- Children: Clyde McBride (adopted son)
- Nationality: American

Howard and Harold McBride are a pair of fictional supporting characters in the American animated television series The Loud House and its resulting multimedia franchise on Nickelodeon. Howard is voiced by Michael McDonald and Harold was voiced by Wayne Brady until 2022 when he was replaced by Khary Payton. Their first appearance was in "Overnight Success", following an episode in which they were only mentioned ("A Tale of Two Tables"). The McBrides are significant as the first married gay couple to be featured in a Nickelodeon animated series. The McBrides are notably also an interracial couple. Their introduction into the series was described as remarkable and caused a boost in ratings for the show.

Howard and Harold are the adoptive gay fathers of Clyde McBride, who is a main character and the best friend of protagonist Lincoln Loud. Clyde's birth parents have never been seen. They shower Clyde with attention and rarely let him do anything unsupervised. Howard is sensitive and neurotic, often getting overemotional while watching Clyde grow up. Harold's parenting style contrasts with Howard's; he is calm, collected, and concerned with Clyde's safety and health above everything else, but also a little more willing to be lenient. The McBrides serve as foils to Lincoln's less worrisome parents.

The characters have been met with praise from television critics and fans for being a positive representation of an interracial gay married couple. Positive reviews of the series have also called attention to the lack of focus placed on their sexual orientations, as well as their depiction as fit and capable LGBT parents. The characters' portrayals have received accolades and nominations from organizations including GLAAD, NAMIC, and South Florida Gay News. However, the introduction of the characters resulted in some controversy and censorship of the series.

== Characters ==
=== Role ===
Howard and Harold are helicopter parents to Clyde and tend to be overprotective of him. Howard feels the need to protect Clyde at all times and never lets him out of sight, unless he is with Lincoln or at school. Howard is also sensitive and overemotional, often needing Harold to get him to chill out when he gets worked up. Harold's demeanor is the opposite; he is straightforward and even-tempered. Both of the McBrides have a fondness for cats and have adopted two, Cleopawtra and Nepurrtiti (named after Cleopatra and Nefertiti, two Egyptian queens).

A running gag is the McBrides' impractically large and ever-expanding repertoire of hobbies and former jobs, which increases to include any skill set that an episode's plot demands. Whenever one of the Loud children learns something new from Howard and Harold, they will simply say that "Mr. McBride" taught them, leaving it intentionally ambiguous as to which dad possesses each skill. The only constant hobby is Harold's talent for preparing home-cooked meals for Clyde and Howard, particularly one of Clyde's favorite foods: Swiss chard frittatas. The McBrides are foils to Lincoln Loud's parents, who are less worrisome and more sensible despite having eleven children instead of one.

Howard and Harold made their on-screen debut in "Overnight Success", in which they bring Clyde to a sleepover at Lincoln's house and Howard has trouble letting him leave. They had been mentioned previously in "A Tale of Two Tables" and "Hand-Me-Downer", which were the first two full-length episodes of The Loud House to be released online.

=== Development ===
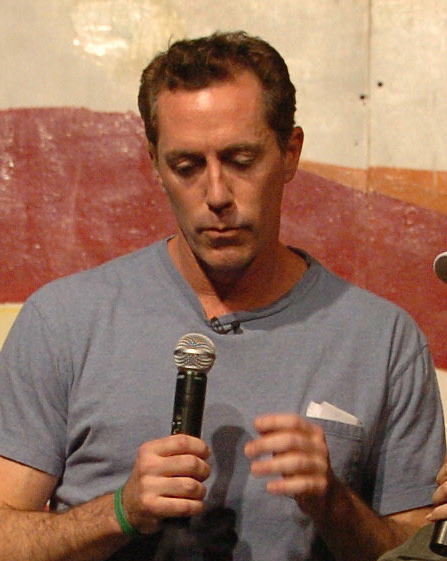
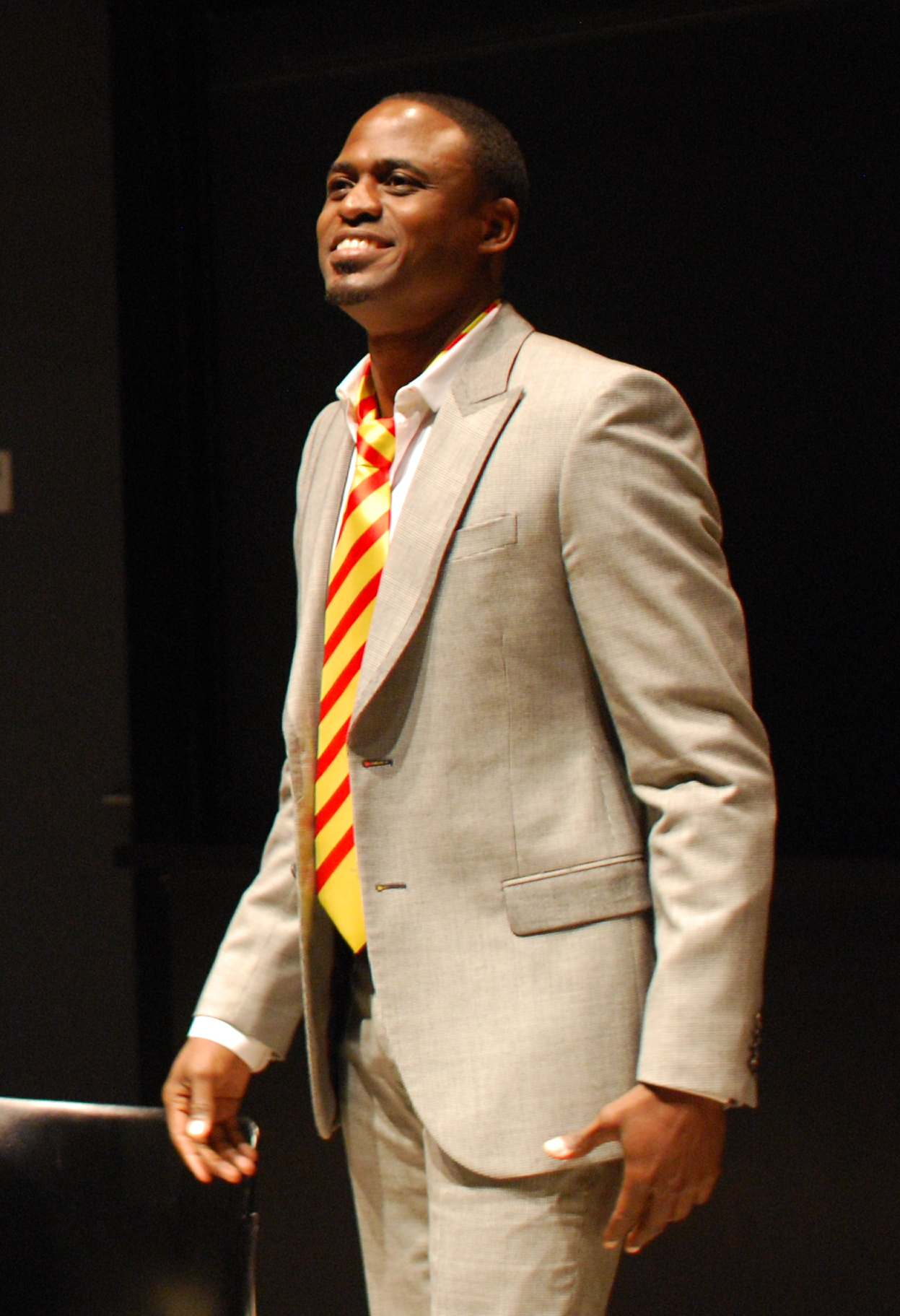
Michael McDonald (left) and Wayne Brady (right) voice Howard and Harold.

Howard and Harold were some of the first supporting characters to be created for the show. Series creator Chris Savino stated in an interview with Geeks OUT that he made the McBrides gay because "The Loud House is about family and we decided very early that we would try to represent all kinds of modern family." Their names are derived from the married uncles of a guest at a party which writer Kevin Sullivan attended after being tasked to write their debut episode. Howard and Harold's sexual orientation is intentionally never mentioned on the program, and they are portrayed as any other couple would be. They do not exhibit stereotypical mannerisms of gay men, such as exaggerated effeminacy and flamboyance. According to Shoma Chaudhury's Catch News, Howard and Harold were created with the goal of "introducing children to LGBT characters who are both 'normal' and likeable." Amanda Cordner of Viacom International, which produces the show, called the casual inclusion of Howard and Harold part of The Loud House's "genius" and called the program "an accurate reflection of modern life; it holds up a mirror so kids can see themselves... [LGBT representation] is increasingly normal, and that's the brilliance of it." A study conducted by Nickelodeon's EVP of consumer insights, Sujata Luther, in October 2016 used the characters as an example of how Nickelodeon "is continuously shaping its shows and digital services to meet the changing face of its viewers."

== Reception ==
Critical responses to the characters have been positive. Time reported in July 2016 that "people are thrilled about Nickelodeon's decision" to include a gay couple. Kaitlyn Hayes of PinkNews wrote in her review of The Loud House that their portrayal in "such a natural and accurate way still puts a huge smile on our faces." Radio Times reported that the social networking site Twitter had given rise to many "overwhelmingly positive" tweets about the couple. Laura Bradley of Vanity Fair stated that The Loud House "handles the topic [of same-sex marriage] in exactly the right way...this kind of casual representation in children's programming is a milestone." De Elizabeth of Teen Vogue wrote, "The best part is that the show doesn't treat these characters any differently, or even introduce them with a heavy asterisk about their marital status." The Frisky's Tai Gooden noted that "kids who have two dads (or moms) will be more than thrilled to see a family they can identify with on TV."

Commenting on the McBride parents' debut, the staff of Rotten Tomatoes expressed hopes that the two characters would continue to make prominent appearances. Writing for The A.V. Club, William Hughes stated that he viewed Howard and Harold as more significant than previous LGBT characters in children's media, since they are recurring and not one-off characters like most others. The vocal performances of Michael McDonald and Wayne Brady have also been positively reviewed; Bustle's Jordana Lipsitz stated that "the show could not have picked better actors to portray" Howard and Harold.

The characters have also been received well outside of the United States. The French magazine Yagg stated that the McBrides were "brilliantly brought into the plot" and that they had "conquered" fans overseas. The Spanish news site Fórmula TV wrote, "the milestone is not only given by the sexual orientation and gender of the couple, but also by their skin colors, as it is an interracial marriage." Viacom Media Networks, which distributes the series internationally, responded to the media's support of the characters by stating that "we're 'Loud' and proud of our commitment to LGBT representation."

Aside from critical reception, the characters have also been well-received within the fan base. One interracial married gay couple in particular with an African-American daughter who was a fan of the series read about their debut episode before it first aired, but did not inform their daughter because they intended to watch the episode with her. The daughter's immediate response to the reveal of Clyde's fathers was that his family closely resembled their family, and the family sent an e-mail to the episode's writer, Kevin Sullivan, informing him of their positive response to the episode, touching on how the series had accurately portrayed a family like theirs.

=== Censorship and controversy ===
Like the inclusion of LGBT characters on other children's programs, the inclusion of Howard and Harold McBride on The Loud House have been met with criticism from a particular group; the One Million Moms division of the American Family Association objected to scenes featuring the McBride parents and unsuccessfully pushed for the episode in which they first appeared to be edited to exclude the couple, saying that "Nickelodeon should stick to entertaining instead of pushing an agenda." Wayne Brady commented on the issue in an interview with The Arizona Republic, stating that "it's ridiculous in 2016 an animated series would rankle so many people because it happens to depict something that actually exists in real life."

Episodes focusing on Howard and Harold were pulled from Nickelodeon's African channel. Other episodes in which the characters are featured or mentioned briefly are edited so that the McBride parents are not included. This decision was criticized by fans from South Africa, where gay marriage has been legal since 2006. Viacom stated that, since the feed reaches other African markets where homosexuality is suppressed, they would risk losing their broadcasting license by showing Howard and Harold. Their introductory episode was made available on the South African DStv's video on demand service following the controversy. In the Arabic dub, Howard was given a female voice actor and addressed as Clyde's mother, as homosexuality is widely seen as taboo in the Arab world and illegal in several, if not most Arab countries. His physical appearance was retained, only his voice and dialogue are altered. However, episodes featuring LGBT characters (e.g. Howard and Harold, Luna and Sam) were banned from airing on MBC 3. The McBrides are the second pair of children's characters whose same-sex relationship has been censored for foreign markets; the first was Ruby and Sapphire of Steven Universe.

In June 2017, The Loud House and five other children's television shows featuring LGBT characters were censored in Kenya by the Kenya Film Classification Board. The series was at the top of the Kenya Film Classification Board's blacklist, and a complaint from the KFCB argued that The Loud House tries to "normalize, glamorize, and even glorify homosexual behavior." Viacom publicly responded, saying that they respected "the varied cultures and regulatory codes of the markets in which we operate" but would "be making the content available on catch up services" in markets where broadcasting codes allow. In the same month, a youth counsellor from Abuja complained to the News Agency of Nigeria about The Loud House and other children's series featuring LGBT themes, calling them "subtle campaigns disguised in forms of cartoons to capture the minds of children."

On June 6, 2018, episodes featuring Howard and Harold were banned from airing on the Polish feed of Nickelodeon following a complaint by the Ordo Iuris to the Polish National Broadcasting Council that their portrayal violates Article 18 of the Polish Constitution, which defines marriage as "a union of a man and a woman."

=== Awards and achievements ===
The Loud House's portrayal of Howard and Harold McBride led the series to be nominated for Outstanding Individual Episode at the 28th GLAAD Media Awards and for Outstanding Kids & Family Programming at the 29th GLAAD Media Awards.

In October 2016, Howard and Harold's introduction was named one of the five best LGBT moments in children's cartoons by South Florida Gay News. In May 2017, The Loud House's portrayal of the McBrides was nominated for a Vision Award from NAMIC (National Association for Multi-Ethnicity in Communications).

The widest viewership ever for an episode of The Loud House was 2.28 million for "Two Boys and a Baby" on July 19, 2016; this was the first episode to air after Howard and Harold were announced. The writers of the magazine SOHH examined this and proposed the question, "are [Nickelodeon executives] looking at reality or just trying to get ratings?"

== See also ==
- The Legend of Korra, the first Nickelodeon animated series to feature LGBT characters
