= Chris Savino =

American comic book artist, writer and animator (born 1971)

- Born: Christopher Mason Savino; October 2, 1971 (age 55); Royal Oak, Michigan, U.S.
- Occupations: Comic book artist; writer; animator
- Years active: 1991–present
- Known for: The Loud House; Dexter's Laboratory; The Powerpuff Girls; My Gym Partner's a Monkey; Kick Buttowski: Suburban Daredevil; Johnny Test
- Children: 3
- Website: chrissavinoauthor.com

Christopher Mason Savino (born October 2, 1971) is an American comic book artist, writer and former animator, best known for creating the animated series The Loud House for Nickelodeon. Prior, Savino worked as a storyboard artist or writer on animated shows such as The Ren & Stimpy Show, Rocko's Modern Life, Dexter's Laboratory, Cow and Chicken, I Am Weasel, The Powerpuff Girls, Samurai Jack, Foster's Home for Imaginary Friends, My Gym Partner's a Monkey, Kick Buttowski: Suburban Daredevil, My Little Pony: Friendship Is Magic, Mickey Mouse, and Johnny Test.

Savino has been nominated for three Primetime Emmy Awards, two Annie Awards, and a Daytime Emmy Award. In May 2018, The Animation Guild, IATSE Local 839 gave him a one-year suspension due to sexual harassment allegations from Nickelodeon (from which he was fired in October 2017), leading to his animation career being put on halt. Since then, he has moved on to literature.

== Early life and education ==
Savino was born and raised in Royal Oak, Michigan, where he attended Dondero High School. He is the ninth of ten children, having five sisters and four brothers. His biggest influence in the animation world was Mighty Mouse: The New Adventures because of the way its animation style differed from that of the other 1980s animated series.

== Influences ==
He cited the works of Cliff Sterrett, Charles M. Schulz, Jim Davis, Hank Ketcham, Walt Kelly, George Herriman, Bill Watterson, E.C. Segar, Max Fleischer, Chuck Jones, Tex Avery, Bob Clampett, and Jay Ward as influences on his work. While he did state he loved to watch cartoons, it was the comic books that drew him in.

== Career ==
He began his career in the animation industry in 1991 and has worked for Spümcø, Nickelodeon Animation Studio, Hanna-Barbera, Cartoon Network Studios, and Disney Television Animation. He was originally the showrunner for the last two seasons of Dexter's Laboratory, The Powerpuff Girls, Foster's Home for Imaginary Friends, and My Gym Partner's a Monkey. He was also previously a writer for The Grim Adventures of Billy & Mandy, Kick Buttowski: Suburban Daredevil, and Mickey Mouse. In June 2014, his short for Nickelodeon, The Loud House, was greenlit for a full series, which eventually debuted on May 2, 2016.

On November 1, 2019, Savino released his debut children's novel, Coal: A Cautionary Christmas Tale, through Amazon Publishing. Later on December of the same year he published the first installment of his graphic novel duology Bigfoot & Gray.

On March 3, 2020, he published his first non-fiction book, a guide to write cartoons entitled Writing Cartoons in 4 Acts (Or How I Learned to Stop Worrying and Love the Midpoint).

Since January 5, 2020, he also publishes the Sunday strip For Brothers.

== Sexual harassment allegations ==
On October 17, 2017, Cartoon Brew reported that Nickelodeon had suspended Savino from their studio due to multiple allegations of sexual harassment against him; rumors of Savino's inappropriate behavior had existed for "at least a decade". As many as a dozen women accused Savino of sexual harassment, unwanted sexual advances, and threats of blacklisting female colleagues who no longer agreed to consensual relationships with him. On October 19, a Nickelodeon spokesperson confirmed that they severed ties with Savino, and that The Loud House would continue production without him, replacing him with story editor Michael Rubiner as executive producer and showrunner.

On October 23, Savino spoke for the first time since the allegations first appeared, saying he was "deeply sorry" for his actions. On May 30, 2018, he was given a one-year suspension from The Animation Guild, IATSE Local 839. As part of his plea bargain with The Animation Guild, Savino was ordered to donate $4,000 to a charity chosen by the guild, complete 40 hours of community service, undergo counseling, and obtain a certificate of sexual harassment training.

The allegations and his union suspension process were featured in a March 2019 segment on Full Frontal with Samantha Bee titled "#MeToon" that was produced and animated by a crew of all women, and featured interviews with a few of the female animators that were involved in his successful union suspension campaign along with one of his alleged victims.

== Personal life ==
In October 2019, Savino stated that he was a born-again Christian.

== Filmography ==
=== Television ===
Year	Title	Director	Producer	Writer	Animator	Notes
1991–96	The Ren & Stimpy Show	No	No	No	Yes	layout artist
1993–96	Rocko's Modern Life	No	No	No	Yes	storyboard clean-up/prop designer/character designer
1995	The Baby Huey Show	No	No	No	Yes	layout artist/character prop designer (Season 2)
1995	Hate	No	No	No	Yes	layout artist
1996	The Mouse and the Monster	No	No	No	Yes	character designer
1996–97	Hey Arnold!	No	No	No	Yes	storyboard director/prop designer/character designer
1997–2001	The Angry Beavers	Yes	No	No	No	character designer 5 episodes only
1997	Duckman	No	No	No	Yes	storyboard artist
1997–2003	Dexter's Laboratory	Yes	Yes	Yes	Yes	storyboard artist/animation director
1998	Space Goofs	No	No	No	Yes	storyboard artist Episode: "Time for a Change"
1998	Cow and Chicken	No	No	No	Yes	storyboard artist Episode: "Cow Fly"
1998	I Am Weasel	No	No	No	Yes	storyboard artist Episodes: "I.R. in Wrong Cartoon" and "Unsinkable I.R."
1998–2005	The Powerpuff Girls	Yes	Yes	Yes	Yes	storyboard artist
2000	The Cartoon Cartoon Show	No	No	Yes	Yes	creator/storyboard director/model designer/animation layout "Foe Paws" animation layout "Jeffrey Cat: Claw and Odor"
2002–03	Samurai Jack	Yes	No	No	No	
2002	Whatever Happened to... Robot Jones?	No	No	No	Yes	Character and Prop models
2003	The Grim Adventures of Billy & Mandy	No	No	No	Yes	storyboard artist Episode: "To Eris Human"
2004–07	Foster's Home for Imaginary Friends	Yes	No	Yes	No	animation director
2005–06	Johnny Test	Yes	Yes	No	Yes	storyboard artist; season 1
2005–08	My Life as a Teenage Robot	Yes	No	No	No	
2007–08	My Gym Partner's a Monkey	No	No	No	Yes	storyboard artist/sheet timer
2008	Ni Hao, Kai-Lan	No	No	No	Yes	storyboard artist/storybook artist
2010–12	Kick Buttowski: Suburban Daredevil	Yes	Yes	Yes	No	executive producer
2010–11	My Little Pony: Friendship Is Magic	No	No	Yes	No	writer Episodes: "Boast Busters" and "Stare Master"
2013	Mickey Mouse	Yes	No	Yes	Yes	storyboard artist Episode: "Bad Ear Day"
2015	Get Blake!	No	No	Yes	No	writer Episodes: "Get Snatched!" and "Get Western!"
2016–18	The Loud House	Yes	Yes	Yes	Yes	creator/executive producer/storyboard artist
2016	All in with Cam Newton	No	No	No	No	Himself; Episode: "All in with Josh"

=== Film ===
Year	Title	Director	Producer	Writer	Animator	Notes
1999	Dexter's Laboratory: Ego Trip	No	No	Story	Yes	storyboard artist
2001	The Flintstones: On the Rocks	Yes	No	Yes	Yes	storyboard artist/art director

=== Internet ===
Year	Title	Role	Notes
2016	Cartoons VS Cancer	Episode 9: "The One with Chris Savino"	Podcast
2016–17	Nickelodeon Animation Podcast	Episodes (2 & 40): "Chris Savino", "Inside the Loud House Writers' Room"	Podcast

== Awards and nominations ==
Date	Award	Category	Work	Shared with	Result
2000	Annie Awards	Outstanding Individual Achievement for Writing in an Animated Television Production	The Powerpuff Girls (for "Dream Scheme")	—N/a	Nominated
2004	Primetime Emmy Awards	Outstanding Animated Program (For Programming One Hour or More)	The Powerpuff Girls: 'Twas the Fight Before Christmas	Craig McCracken, Brian A. Miller, Lauren Faust, Craig Lewis, Amy Keating Rogers, Robert Alvarez, John McIntyre, Randy Myers, James T. Walker, and Juli Murphy	Nominated
2006	Primetime Emmy Awards	Outstanding Animated Program (For Programming One Hour or More)	My Life as a Teenage Robot: Escape from Cluster Prime	Rob Renzetti, Fred Seibert, Scott D. Peterson, Alex Kirwan, Brandon Kruse, Heather Martinez, Chris Reccardi, Bryan Andrews, and Robert Alvarez	Nominated
2010	Primetime Emmy Awards	Outstanding Short-Format Animated Program	Kick Buttowski: Suburban Daredevil (for "Racing the School Bus")	Sandro Corsaro and Janelle Momary	Nominated
2011	Daytime Emmy Awards	Outstanding Directing in an Animated Program	Kick Buttowski: Suburban Daredevil	Sherm Cohen	Nominated
2012	Annie Awards	Outstanding Directing in a Television Production	Kick Buttowski: Suburban Daredevil	Clayton Morrow	Nominated
