= My Little Pony: Friendship Is Magic season 8 =

My Little Pony: Friendship Is Magic
- Season 8
- No. of episodes: 26

Release
- Original network: Discovery Family
- Original release: March 24 – October 13, 2018

Season chronology
- ← Previous; Season 7 Next → Season 9

The eighth season of the animated television series My Little Pony: Friendship Is Magic, developed by Lauren Faust, originally aired on the Discovery Family channel in the United States. The series is based on Hasbro's My Little Pony line of toys and animated works and is often referred by collectors to be the fourth generation, or "G4", of the My Little Pony franchise. Season 8 of the series premiered on March 24, 2018, on Discovery Family, an American pay television channel partly owned by Hasbro, and concluded on October 13.

The season focuses on Twilight Sparkle running her newly established School of Friendship to teach ponies and creatures from Equestria and beyond about the benefits of friendship with her friends serving as the teachers. However, one of the students, a seemingly innocent pegasus filly named Cozy Glow, is secretly plotting against them.

== Development ==
On May 25, 2017, supervising director Jim Miller announced via Twitter an eighth season for the series. At Hasbro's first self-themed convention (aptly named HasCon) on September 9, an animatic from an upcoming episode was shown.

On February 8, 2018, Discovery Family's March press release states that this season, "viewers will witness major milestones featuring the introduction of Starlight Glimmer's parents and Princess Celestia's big acting debut. Additionally, the Mane 6's Twilight Sparkle, Rarity, Applejack, Pinkie Pie, Rainbow Dash and Fluttershy are accompanied by six new creatures including Ocellus the Changeling, Silverstream the Hippogriff/Seapony, Smolder the Dragon, Gallus the Griffin, Yona the Yak and Sandbar the Pony, joining them on epic adventures throughout new and familiar lands such as Mount Aris, Everfree Forest, Las Pegasus and more. Fan-favorite characters Maud Pie, Spike, the Cutie Mark Crusaders, Queen Chrysalis and Discord return with exciting storylines and a whole lot of magic!"

== Cast ==
=== Main ===
- Tara Strong as Twilight Sparkle
  - Rebecca Shoichet as Twilight Sparkle (singing voice)
- Tabitha St. Germain as Rarity
  - Kazumi Evans as Rarity (singing voice)
- Ashleigh Ball as Applejack and Rainbow Dash
- Andrea Libman as Fluttershy and Pinkie Pie
  - Shannon Chan-Kent as Pinkie Pie (singing voice)
- Cathy Weseluck as Spike

=== Recurring ===
- The Young Six
  - Vincent Tong as Sandbar
  - Gavin Langelo as Gallus
  - Katrina Salisbury as Yona
  - Shannon Chan-Kent as Smolder
  - Lauren Jackson as Silverstream
  - Devyn Dalton as Ocellus
- Kelly Sheridan as Starlight Glimmer
- Nicole Oliver as Princess Celestia
- Tabitha St. Germain as Princess Luna
- The Cutie Mark Crusaders
  - Michelle Creber as Apple Bloom
  - Madeleine Peters as Scootaloo (Note: Arielle Tuliao provides Scootaloo's singing voice in "Surf and/or Turf" instead of Peters.)
  - Claire Corlett as Sweetie Belle

=== Minor ===
==== Single roles ====
- Maurice LaMarche as Chancellor Neighsay
- Richard Ian Cox as Grampa Gruff
- Garry Chalk as Prince Rutherford
- Ali Milner as Ember
- Kyle Rideout as Thorax
- Caitlyn Bairstow as Blue Bobbin
- Matt Hill as Soarin'
- Kelly Sheridan as Misty Fly
- Colin Murdock as On Stage
- Ian Hanlin as Sunburst
- John de Lancie as Discord
- Rebecca Shoichet as Sugar Belle
- Brenda Crichlow as Zecora
- Sunni Westbrook as Cozy Glow
- Andrea Libman as Bon Bon
- Trevor Devall as Iron Will
- Richard Newman as Cranky Doodle
- Chris Britton as Star Swirl the Bearded
- Sam Vincent as Flim
- Scott McNeil as Flam
- Patricia Drake as Yingrid
- Britt McKillip as Princess Cadance
- Rhona Rees as Rolling Thunder
- Britt Irvin as Lightning Dust
- Kelly Metzger as Spitfire
- Matt Cowlrick as Rockhoof
- Kelli Ogmundson as Professor Fossil
- Giles Panton as Flash Magnus
- Ellen-Ray Hennessy as Mistmane
- Murry Peeters as Somnambula
- Mariee Devereux as Mage Meadowbrook
- Mark Acheson as Lord Tirek

==== Multiple roles ====
- Ingrid Nilson as Maud Pie, Limestone Pie, and Marble Pie
- Peter New as Big McIntosh (Note: Has an uncredited speaking role in "Fake It 'Til You Make It".) and Goldie Delicious
- Tabitha St. Germain as Granny Smith, Mrs. Cake, Princess Flurry Heart, and Muffins
- Kathleen Barr as Queen Chrysalis and Trixie Lulamoon

=== Guest stars ===
==== Single roles ====
- Christopher Gaze as Seaspray
- Adam Kirschner as Mudbriar
- Shirley Millner as Apple Rose
- Marcy Goldberg as Applesauce
- Alex Zahara as Jack Pot
- Cole Howard as Terramar
- Brian Dobson as Sky Beak
- Advah Soudack as Ocean Flow
- Adam Greydon Reid as Firelight
- Trish Pattendon as Stellar Flare
- Jason Simpson as Bufogren
- Andrew McNee as Short Fuse
- Rachel Bloom as Autumn Blaze
- Nicole Bouma as Rain Shine
- Dave Pettitt as Sludge

==== Multiple roles ====
- Tariq Leslie as Big Bucks and Hoo'Far

== Episodes ==
Directors for each episode are Denny Lu and Mike Myhre.

| No. overall | No. in season | Title | Written by | Original release date | Prod. code |
|---|---|---|---|---|---|
| 170 | 1 | "School Daze" (Parts 1 & 2) | Michael Vogel & Nicole Dubuc | March 24, 2018 | 801 |
| 171 | 2 | "School Daze" (Parts 1 & 2) | Michael Vogel & Nicole Dubuc | March 24, 2018 | 802 |
Part 1: Shortly after the Storm King's defeat, Twilight and her friends return home to discover that the map has expanded to cover lands beyond Equestria. Realizing there are so many creatures who know nothing about friendship, Twilight decides to open a school where they can come to learn all about it and receives approval from the Equestria Education Association, who expect her to do things their way. On the school's opening day, Twilight appoints her friends as the teachers and welcomes five students from all the kingdoms to attend: Gallus, a sarcastic griffon; Yona, a clumsy yak; Smolder, a cocky dragon; Ocellus, a timid changeling; and Silverstream, an excitable hippogriff. They initially enjoy the school, but soon grow bored of the school as the EEA's strict teaching guidelines become rigorously enforced by Twilight, so they decide to skip class with their pony classmate Sandbar. As they are becoming friends, they accidentally wreak havoc on the school during an evaluation conducted by Chancellor Neighsay, head of the EEA. Convinced that the non-pony students are dangerous, Neighsay immediately shuts the school down. Part 2: Twilight becomes depressed over her school being unaccredited until Starlight encourages her to try again without following the EEA's rules. She and her friends attempt to convince the other kingdoms' leaders to let their students return to the school, only to learn that the students have all run away from home, unwilling to part with each other. They discover that Sandbar has been hiding the students at the Castle of the Two Sisters in the Everfree Forest, where they rescue them from being attacked by a horde of pukwudgies. The students agree to give the school another chance after Twilight and her friends assure them things will be different. Chancellor Neighsay confronts Twilight for her unauthorized reopening of the school, but she asserts her authority as Princess of Friendship and writes her own set of school rules. Twilight's friends use unique teaching methods to make the school more appealing, and the leaders allow their students to continue their studies in Equestria.
| 172 | 3 | "The Maud Couple" | Nick Confalone | March 31, 2018 | 803 |
Pinkie Pie learns that her sister Maud is dating a stallion named Mudbriar, who has an interest in sticks similar to Maud's interest in rocks and is as outwardly dull and blunt as she is. Although Maud and Mudbriar are happy together, Pinkie fails to notice their similarities, finding Mudbriar's personality and quirks to be annoying and strange. Unable to comprehend their relationship, Pinkie eventually becomes convinced that Maud prefers Mudbriar over her and flees to her family's rock farm in despair. After her sisters Limestone and Marble help her realize that Maud's happiness with Mudbriar is all that matters, Pinkie returns and makes peace with Mudbriar, putting up with him for Maud's sake.
| 173 | 4 | "Fake It 'Til You Make It" | Josh Hamilton | April 7, 2018 | 804 |
Rarity leaves Fluttershy in charge of her boutique in Manehattan while she is out of town for a fashion show in Canterlot. Fluttershy is intimidated by the pushy customers, so Rarity advises her to wear an outfit to boost her confidence. Taking Rarity's advice to heart, Fluttershy begins dressing up and acting out different characters to match her customers' personalities, which helps the store's sales. However, she takes her role playing so far that she begins driving customers away with her rude behavior, getting rid of her raccoon helpers as well. The raccoons bring Fluttershy's friends to help, but she kicks them out of the store. Her friends then turn to Rarity, who fires Fluttershy, bringing her back to her senses. Fluttershy apologizes to her friends, and Rarity assures her that she already has the inner strength needed to succeed.
| 174 | 5 | "Grannies Gone Wild" | Gillian M. Berrow | April 14, 2018 | 805 |
Rainbow Dash is eager to ride the Wild Blue Yonder, a famous roller coaster in Las Pegasus, before it permanently closes. Applejack agrees to take over her classes at the School of Friendship if she chaperones Granny Smith and her elderly relatives for their annual Las Pegasus vacation, strictly instructing her to never let them overexert themselves or leave her sight. Rainbow Dash reluctantly accepts and attempts to convince the grannies to rest in their hotel so she can have time for herself. However, the grannies sneak off while Rainbow Dash discovers the coaster's long waiting line, forcing her to spend most of the day following them and interfering with their exciting activities, much to their annoyance. When Rainbow Dash apologizes for ruining their fun and explains she is only following Applejack's instructions, the grannies laugh over Applejack's overprotectiveness and invite Rainbow Dash to ride the coaster with them, using their VIP passes to skip the line.
| 175 | 6 | "Surf and/or Turf" | Brian Hohlfeld | April 21, 2018 | 806 |
When the map sends the Cutie Mark Crusaders on a friendship mission to the hippogriffs' kingdom on Mount Aris, where half of its citizens have decided to live in their underwater home of Seaquestria as seaponies, they meet Silverstream's brother Terramar, who cannot decide whether he belongs on land with his father or underwater with his mother. The Crusaders are unable to agree among themselves, with Sweetie Belle arguing for the mountain's captivating landscape while Scootaloo favors the fun of swimming with the sea creatures, which makes Terramar even more indecisive. The Crusaders arrange a gathering of hippogriffs and seaponies at the shoreline for Terramar, whose parents tell him he is not limited to choosing one place to live. Encouraged, Terramar settles on living as both a hippogriff and a seapony.
| 176 | 7 | "Horse Play" | Kaita Mpambara | April 28, 2018 | 807 |
Twilight organizes a stage play honoring the anniversary of Princess Celestia's first raising of the sun. Learning that Celestia has never been in a play despite her love of theater, Twilight offers her the lead role, much to Celestia's glee. As Rainbow Dash excitedly spreads the word all across Equestria, however, Twilight is mortified by Celestia's poor acting skills and fears that she will humiliate herself in front of her subjects. Applejack suggests to Twilight that she should tell Celestia the truth, but she refuses to listen because she does not want to hurt Celestia's feelings. When the day of the play arrives and Celestia's performance has not improved, Twilight panics and unwittingly vents her frustrations with Celestia, who overheard everything she said, causing her to storm off because Twilight was not honest with her. Twilight apologizes to Celestia for lying and admits she only intended to repay her for her years of guidance. Celestia agrees to help Twilight salvage the play by directing the other actors from backstage, making it a success.
| 177 | 8 | "The Parent Map" | Dave Rapp | May 5, 2018 | 808 |
Starlight and Sunburst are disappointed when they learn the map has sent them on a friendship mission to their hometown, Sire's Hollow, because of their strained relationship with their parents: Firelight, Starlight's over-affectionate father, and Stellar Flare, Sunburst's domineering mother. After seeing their parents are feuding over the changes they are making to the town, Starlight and Sunburst reluctantly help them resolve their issues, but later realizes they were not the problem. Starlight and Sunburst try to avoid their parents as much as possible while they look for their real mission, only for their parents to continually meddle with their search. After finally snapping at their parents for their unwanted interference, Starlight and Sunburst realize their estrangement from them is the problem they were summoned to solve. They complete their mission by apologizing to their parents, who agree to give them more independence.
| 178 | 9 | "Non-Compete Clause" | Kim Beyer-Johnson | May 12, 2018 | 809 |
Applejack and Rainbow Dash compete with each other to receive the "Teacher of the Month" award at the School of Friendship. Twilight selects them to lead a field trip together to teach their students about teamwork, but their constant bickering over which activities they should do creates problems. Persuading Twilight to give them another chance, they continue the trip by letting the other take the lead, which takes up more of their focus than teaching their students. When their polite argument over making a bridge leaves them stuck over a river, the students work together to save them. The students vouch for them as teacher of the month by telling Twilight that they were arguing on purpose to teach them the incorrect way of working as a team, but Twilight catches on to the truth, causing Applejack and Rainbow Dash to argue all over again.
| 179 | 10 | "The Break Up Break Down" | Nick Confalone | May 19, 2018 | 810 |
On Hearts and Hooves Day, Big Mac sends a romantic package to Sugar Belle, but it got lost in the mail and sent to Sweetie Belle by mistake. When Big Mac notices Sugar Belle at Sugarcube Corner later, he overhears her talking with Mrs. Cake about ending a relationship with someone and concludes that she means to break up with him, which breaks his heart. Spike and Discord attempt to console Big Mac, with Discord suggesting he assert himself by breaking up with Sugar Belle before she does. After he does so, breaking her heart, Big Mac realizes he has only been letting out his frustrations and returns to Sugar Belle to have a proper conversation over their breakup. Sugar Belle reveals that she never received Big Mac's package and had actually planned to end her business relationship with her cousin so she could begin working in Ponyville. Realizing their miscommunication, they get back together while learning a lesson about proper communication rather than assuming and eavesdropping.
| 180 | 11 | "Molt Down" | Josh Haber | May 26, 2018 | 811 |
Spike begins experiencing bizarre body changes such as pimple-like blemishes, losing control of his fire breath, and emitting foul stenches. Smolder explains that Spike is molting, which all dragons undergo during adolescence, and she adds that the molting process typically causes dragons to be kicked out of their homes, which Spike worries is the case when Twilight tells him to leave the castle to keep him from accidentally burning their belongings. When he visits Zecora for a solution, his smell unwittingly attracts a predatory roc that catches Zecora, and Rarity. Spike molts all of his skin to find he has grown a pair of wings, which allows him to fend the roc off and rescue his friends. Afterward, Twilight assures Spike that she has no intention of getting rid of him and promises to help him get used to his changes.
| 181 | 12 | "Marks for Effort" | Nicole Dubuc | June 2, 2018 | 812 |
Bored with their ordinary classes, the Cutie Mark Crusaders attempt to enroll at the more exciting School of Friendship, but Twilight turns them away, saying they already know about friendship. The Crusaders later meet a young student from the school named Cozy Glow, who is struggling with her homework, and figure that helping her would be just as good as attending Twilight's school. Cozy aces her assignment under their tutelage and asks them to help her prepare for an upcoming test. When Cozy fails the test and explains the Crusaders' involvement, Twilight believes they gave her poor guidance on purpose and bans them from the school grounds. Later, Cozy confesses that she failed her test on purpose to make Twilight consider accepting the Crusaders as students like they wanted. After Cozy apologizes to the Crusaders, Twilight, in an act of penance for her poor judgement, allows them back in the school and gives them honorary diplomas, granting them positions at the school as official friendship tutors.
| 182 | 13 | "The Mean 6" | Michael Vogel | June 9, 2018 | 813 |
Queen Chrysalis creates the evil clones of Twilight and her friends, so she can seize control of the Elements of Harmony and exact her revenge on Starlight. The clones search for the Elements in the Everfree Forest, where Twilight and her friends are on a camping trip. Wandering off from each other, the group encounters the clones, who mistreat and insult them. Mistaking the clones for their actual friends, they get into a heated argument when they eventually regroup, but Twilight quickly manages to resolve it, and they make up. Meanwhile, Chrysalis and the clones find the Tree of Harmony, but the Elements destroy the clones when they attempt to use them to betray Chrysalis, who once again swears revenge on Starlight, and flees while the real ponies happily resume their trip and laugh off their worst day ever.
| 183 | 14 | "A Matter of Principals" | Nicole Dubuc | August 4, 2018 | 814 |
Starlight has been asked to run the school and do a scavenger hunt after the map sends Twilight and her friends on a friendship mission far away from Ponyville. Discord appears and offers to help out, but Starlight refuses, so Discord begins to unleash chaos on the school with Starlight trying to control each situation. She gets fed up with his antics and banishes him from the school grounds with her magic. The scavenger hunt goes underway afterwards, but Discord, manifesting as a ghost, sabotages it. Starlight realizes what she did to Discord was wrong in turning down his offer to help and apologizes to him. She unbanishes Discord and offers him the position of vice headmare, which he accepts it and helps re-do the scavenger hunt. However, Twilight and her friends return and reveal that Discord created a fake friendship mission to send them away, but thanks Starlight for helping run the school.
| 184 | 15 | "The Hearth's Warming Club" | Brian Hohlfeld | August 4, 2018 | 815 |
As the School of Friendship is about to go on winter break, a cloaked figure covers the Hearth's Warming Eve decorations in purple goo. Twilight, Rainbow Dash, and Spike chase the figure into the students' dormitory, but does not see it leave, leading them to conclude that one of them is responsible. The guilty party will have to stay over the break for extra friendship lessons, and if none of them confesses, all of them will stay and miss the holidays. As the students begin cleaning up and Rainbow Dash calls them in for questioning, they describe the way their respective cultures celebrate the holidays. None of them confesses, leading to accusations and arguments that eventually prompt Gallus to admit that he pulled the prank, because he wanted to stay on campus with his friends instead of going home to Griffonstone and its dreary celebration. Having overheard, Twilight thanks him for his honesty, but says that he must still face punishment. The other students volunteer to stay with Gallus, and Twilight invites the entire group to celebrate Hearth's Warming with her and her friends.
| 185 | 16 | "Friendship University" | Chris "Doc" Wyatt & Kevin Burke | August 11, 2018 | 816 |
When Twilight learns that a new friendship school has opened in Las Pegasus, she and Rarity travel there to check it out. The school, Friendship University, is run by Flim and Flam and has enrolled Star Swirl, to Twilight's shock, and Chancellor Neighsay grants it full accreditation. Twilight and Rarity begin to investigate, with Rarity taking classes and Twilight sneaking into the brothers' office to search for evidence that the school is a fraud. They catch her in the act and threaten to publish a photo of the break-in to ruin her reputation. Twilight accepts at first in the face of Star Swirl's disapproval, but Rarity persuades her not to give up, and Twilight realizes her reputation is worth anything if she does not stand up for what is right. They soon discover that the brothers are charging high fees for the worksheets needed to complete the coursework, based on a stolen copy of Twilight's own curriculum, and planning to use the money to expand their resort. When Star Swirl learns of the scheme, he intimidates them into refunding the students' money and shutting down Friendship University. He promises to attend the School of Friendship if he needs lessons in the future, but Twilight and Rarity are left wondering how Flim and Flam could have gotten Twilight's lesson plans.
| 186 | 17 | "The End in Friend" | Gillian M. Berrow | August 18, 2018 | 817 |
While helping Twilight teach a class on compromise, Rainbow Dash and Rarity get into an argument on how to spend their day off. Twilight and the students accompany them for a practical demonstration, but neither shows much interest in the other's pursuits, and they get so annoyed with each other that they declare their friendship to be at an end. Starlight tries in vain to reconcile them, but receives word that a magical artifact has been stolen from the school. Rainbow Dash and Rarity are dispatched to track it down, but continue to aggravate one another as they follow the artifact's trail to a swamp. Working together, they cross safely to the far shore, follow the trail up a mountainside, and find a secret passage that leads back to campus. There they learn that Twilight, Starlight and Spike faked the theft to remind them of their friendship. Having developed a new appreciation for each other's interests, Rainbow Dash and Rarity leave to go shopping for some new buckball playing gear and fan attire.
| 187 | 18 | "Yakity-Sax" | Michael P. Fox & Wil Fox | August 25, 2018 (Note: This episode aired on July 20, 2018 as part of Discovery Family's "Summer Surprises" programming block, however this article will use the order provided by The Futon Critic to keep consistency.) | 818 |
Pinkie Pie has taken up the yovidaphone, a popular instrument in Yakyakistan, but her inept practicing becomes an annoyance to the residents of Ponyville. Her friends let her keep at it, hoping that she will improve, however, her playing remains as bad as ever and starts to interfere with their daily lives. She abandons the instrument at their urging, outwardly cheerful but secretly heartbroken. When the others realize her true emotional state, they try in vain to reengage her in activities that she enjoys and is good at. A few days later, they learn from Maud that Pinkie is moving to Yakyakistan and travel there to find her listening to a performance by a yovidaphone master. The music depresses her even further, since she is convinced, she will never play that well. With a bit of encouragement from her friends, Pinkie plays the master's yovidaphone, and even though her playing is as discordant as before, she regains her happy temperament and earns an ovation from the yaks in the audience, since the master explains that the whole point of the yovidaphone is to bring joy to those who play it.
| 188 | 19 | "Road to Friendship" | Josh Haber | September 1, 2018 | 819 |
After a successful magic show in Ponyville, Trixie decides to do a tour in Saddle Arabia and takes Starlight along. They get along well at first but start to get on each other's nerves once they reach the desert village of Somnambula. Starlight's reckless spending leaves them short of money, and they have to spend the night in Trixie's cramped wagon since all the inns are full. They aggravate each other all night long, and the next day degenerates into an exchange of insults. The next day, Starlight trades Trixie's wagon for a larger one without telling her. Furious, Trixie sends her home with it and tries to continue the tour alone. Starlight eventually returns to apologize for making the trade, and they persuade its original owner, a Saddle Arabian unicorn named Hoo'Far, who had enjoyed the show in Ponyville, to return Trixie's wagon by embarrassing themselves in front of him for the sake of friendship. Returning to Ponyville, Trixie and Starlight are happy for at least having made the attempt and for learning that they should not do it again.
| 189 | 20 | "The Washouts" | Nick Confalone | September 8, 2018 | 820 |
When Rainbow Dash learns that Scootaloo has taken an interest in a stunt team called the Washouts, she fears she may lose her number-one fan. The team's show is filled with dangerous tricks that impress Rainbow Dash in spite of herself, and she discovers that all the members have been thrown out of the Wonderbolts, including her old rival Lightning Dust. Their refusal to follow basic safety protocols worries Rainbow Dash, but neither she nor Spitfire can disabuse Scootaloo of her fascination with the Washouts. In a fit of rebellion, Scootaloo joins the team so she can have a chance to do something amazing despite being unable to fly. Lightning Dust pressures her into doing an extremely dangerous, untested ramp jump on a rocket-powered scooter, but Rainbow Dash saves her just in time and the scooter drags Lightning Dust away into the sky. They apologize to one another, with Scootaloo not seeing the danger Lightning Dust put her in and Rainbow Dash not being a better role model and making Scootaloo feel like she will not be as awesome as her. Afterwards, Rainbow Dash starts a new fan club in Scootaloo's honor.
| 190 | 21 | "A Rockhoof and a Hard Place" | Kaita Mpambara | September 15, 2018 | 821 |
After Rockhoof causes damage to the site of his old village during an archaeological dig, Twilight hires him as a teacher at the School of Friendship. Although the students are captivated by his story of fighting an Ursa Major, he accidentally disrupts classes all over campus while telling it and fighting what he thinks is an out-of-control fire. Twilight and her friends try to find Rockhoof a job in Ponyville, without success, and she and Applejack take him to visit the other Pillars and see how they have adapted to modern society. The visits leave Rockhoof more dejected, and after accidentally steering a hippogriff naval vessel aground, he decides to have Twilight turn him into a statue. Yona persuades him to reconsider by reading him an essay on heroism she wrote for class, and he finds that the entire town is eager to hear the rest of his Ursa Major story. Recognizing that Rockhoof can serve as a living connection to Equestria's past, Twilight appoints him as the Keeper of Tales.
| 191 | 22 | "What Lies Beneath" | Michael Vogel | September 22, 2018 | 822 |
The Young Six's worries over an upcoming exam are worsened by Cozy Glow's comments that friendship goes against the non-pony students' nature. When a light shining from a floor grate in the School of Friendship's library leads them into a network of caverns, they encounter an image of Twilight that declares they must pass a test in order to leave. As a result, each student finds themselves confronted with their worst fears, but are able to overcome them, helping each other through the harder ones, and so prove to the phantom Twilight, which is actually the Tree of Harmony, that they do understand the nature of friendship, passing the test. Once they return to the library, exhausted from the night's adventure, Cozy apologizes for her earlier words and arranges for them to get an extension on their exam.
| 192 | 23 | "Sounds of Silence" | Gregory Bonsignore | September 29, 2018 | 823 |
When the map sends Applejack and Fluttershy on a friendship mission to the Peaks of Peril, they find a village inhabited by peaceful creatures called the Kirin, who do not speak or show any emotion. A talkative outcast Kirin named Autumn Blaze explains to Applejack that an argument between the Kirin once caused them to turn into angry, fiery creatures called the Nirik and burn down their village. After that, they bathed in a magic stream that cooled their emotions and silenced their voices, but Autumn became bored by the silence. She later found a flower that allowed her to speak again, but the village became irritated with her chatter and exiled her. Applejack and Fluttershy argue over the wisdom of giving the cure to the others, leading the Kirin to carry them toward the stream, but Autumn arrives as a Nirik to stop them. Reverting to Kirin form, she convinces the others they can avoid causing destruction as Nirik by channeling feelings of anger through non-destructive outlets before they are consumed by it. After a group of squirrels leads Applejack and Fluttershy to the flowers that Autumn used for the cure, the Kirin regain their voices and welcome Autumn back to the village.
| 193 | 24 | "Father Knows Beast" | Josh Haber | October 6, 2018 | 824 |
As Twilight starts to worry that Spike's upbringing among ponies may have held him back in exploring his dragon heritage, a dragon named Sludge crash-lands in Ponyville. Spike takes him back to the castle so he and his friends can help him recover from his injuries, and Sludge reveals that he is Spike's father and has been trying to find him for years. As Spike and Sludge spend time together, Sludge persuades Spike to give up his comfortable lifestyle in the castle, while secretly planning to move in and enjoy its luxuries for himself. When Twilight expresses her concerns, Spike accuses her of being jealous that he has a real parent in his life, which hurts Twilight's feelings, and Smolder is unimpressed with Sludge's loafing and tells Spike that dragons should not act that way. With her help, Spike tricks Sludge into thinking that both of them are going to move out of the castle and into a cave. Sludge admits he is not Spike's father and leaves, while Spike apologizes to Twilight and acknowledges her as his family.
| 194 | 25 | "School Raze" (Parts 1 & 2) | Nicole Dubuc | October 13, 2018 | 825 |
| 195 | 26 | "School Raze" (Parts 1 & 2) | Josh Haber | October 13, 2018 | 826 |
Part 1: After a malfunctioning spell endangers the students, Twilight and her friends discover that magic is failing across Equestria. Upon Cozy Glow's suggestion, they travel to Tartarus to interrogate Lord Tirek. At the school, Cozy assumes the role of headmare despite Twilight appointing Starlight. Chancellor Neighsay then seizes control from her and detains the Young Six, believing them to be responsible for the failing magic. Faking a betrayal to escape, Sandbar went to get the Cutie Mark Crusaders for help. Meanwhile, Tirek reveals to Twilight and her friends that he has been exchanging letters with a protégé to help him exact revenge by trapping them in Tartarus. While searching underneath the school, Sandbar and the Crusaders discover that Cozy, Tirek's protégé, is using the school's magical artifacts to imprison Starlight and drain all of the magic from Equestria, intending to rule it as the Empress of Friendship. Part 2: Cozy Glow turns the students against Chancellor Neighsay, traps him in his office and regains control of the school. Sandbar frees his friends who free Neighsay and formulate a plan to remove the artifacts to shut down the magic-eating spell. Cozy turns the other students against the Young Six by claiming they are responsible for the disappearing magic. In the struggle, they get trapped in the spell's vortex, but are rescued by the Tree of Harmony's magic. Removing the artifacts, the spell is shut down and magic everywhere is restored. Having escaped Tartarus by coercing Tirek's help, Twilight and her friends prevent Cozy's escape while Twilight tries to explain to her that gaining power is not the purpose of friendship and apologizes for not being able to teach her that lesson. Neighsay returns control of the school to Twilight, having learned that non-ponies are equally capable of friendship. Now imprisoned in Tartarus, Cozy asks Tirek if he wants to be friends with her.

== DVD release ==
Equestria Daily reported that while Shout! Factory has not yet released season 8 on DVD or Blu-ray in North America, Myth Entertainment released the entire season on DVD in Malaysia themselves on December 18, 2019.
