= My Little Pony: Friendship Is Magic season 9 =

My Little Pony: Friendship Is Magic
- Season 9
- No. of episodes: 26

Release
- Original network: Discovery Family
- Original release: April 6 – October 12, 2019

Season chronology
- ← Previous; Season 8 Next → Friendship Is Forever

The ninth and final season of the animated television series My Little Pony: Friendship Is Magic, developed by Lauren Faust, originally aired on the Discovery Family channel in the United States. The series is based on Hasbro's My Little Pony line of toys and animated works and is often referred by collectors to be the fourth generation, or "G4", of the My Little Pony franchise. Season 9 of the series premiered on April 6, 2019, on Discovery Family, an American pay television channel partly owned by Hasbro, and concluded with a three-part series finale on October 12.

The final season focuses on Twilight Sparkle preparing to become the new ruler of Equestria before Princess Celestia and Princess Luna's retirement. At the same time, an evil ram named Grogar forms a team of villains to defeat Twilight and her friends and take over Equestria.

== Development ==
On February 17, 2018, at the American International Toy Fair in New York, a ninth season was announced by Hasbro. In a TV Kids Guide by Gaumont, it was confirmed that season nine will have 26 episodes. At the following year's Toy Fair, it was confirmed that this will be the final season of the series. The writing for this season began in late 2017.

In a March 2019 Discovery Family press release, it was announced that Patton Oswalt and "Weird Al" Yankovic would return to reprise their roles as Quibble Pants and Cheese Sandwich, respectively. According to series' director Jim Miller, Discord impersonating Grogar was planned since the beginning of the season, as they wanted Chrysalis, Tirek and Cozy Glow to be the villains since they had more connection to the main characters.

=== Series finale ===
Upon the broadcast of the three-part series finale, when asked if Applejack and Rainbow Dash were romantically involved in the future setting of "The Last Problem", Miller replied "it's up to the individual viewer to decide what those two are to each other". When asked a similar question regarding Fluttershy and Discord, Miller replied that it was "open to interpretation."

== Cast ==
=== Main ===
- Tara Strong as Twilight Sparkle
  - Rebecca Shoichet as Twilight Sparkle (singing voice)
- Tabitha St. Germain as Rarity
  - Kazumi Evans as Rarity (singing voice)
- Ashleigh Ball as Applejack and Rainbow Dash
- Andrea Libman as Fluttershy and Pinkie Pie
  - Shannon Chan-Kent as Pinkie Pie (singing voice)
- Cathy Weseluck as Spike

=== Recurring ===
- The Young Six
  - Vincent Tong as Sandbar
  - Gavin Langelo as Gallus
  - Christina Salisbury as Yona
  - Shannon Chan-Kent as Smolder
  - Lauren Jackson as Silverstream
  - Devyn Dalton as Ocellus (Note: Shannon Chan-Kent provides Ocellus' singing voice in "Uprooted".)
- Kelly Sheridan as Starlight Glimmer
- Nicole Oliver as Princess Celestia
- Tabitha St. Germain as Princess Luna (Note: Aloma Steele provides Princess Luna's singing voice in "Between Dark and Dawn".)
- The Cutie Mark Crusaders
  - Michelle Creber as Apple Bloom
  - Madeleine Peters as Scootaloo (Note: Arielle Tuliao provides Scootaloo's singing voice in "Growing Up is Hard to Do" instead of Peters.)
  - Claire Corlett as Sweetie Belle
- John de Lancie as Discord
- Mark Acheson as Lord Tirek
- Kathleen Barr as Queen Chrysalis and Trixie Lulamoon
- Sunni Westbrook as Cozy Glow
- Doc Harris as Grogar

=== Minor ===
==== Single roles ====
- Alvin Sanders as King Sombra
- Andrew Francis as Shining Armor
- Britt McKillip as Princess Cadance
- Chris Britton as Star Swirl the Bearded
- Kyle Rideout as Thorax
- Ryan Beil as Zephyr Breeze
- Ellen Kennedy as Dusty Pages
- Shirley Milliner as Apple Rose
- Lee Tockar as Snips
- Patton Oswalt as Quibble Pants
- Ali Milner as Ember
- Vincent Tong as Garble
- Adam Kirschner as Mudbriar
- Ingrid Nilson as Maud Pie
- Cole Howard as Terramar
- Zach LeBlanc as Skeedaddle
- Bill Newton as Snap Shutter
- Cathy Weseluck as Mayor Mare
- Trevor Devall as Fancy Pants
- "Weird Al" Yankovic as Cheese Sandwich
- Kelli Ogmundson as Lighthoof
- Diana Kaarina as Shimmy Shake
- Richard Newman as Cranky Doodle
- Sam Vincent as Feather Flatterfly
- Michael Daingerfield as Braeburn
- Brenda Crichlow as Zecora
- Erin Mathews as Gabby
- Chantal Strand as Spoiled Rich
- Brian Dobson as Skybeak
- Chiara Zanni as Daring Do/A.K. Yearling
- Brian Drummond as Ahuizotl
- Rebecca Husain as Spur
- Rebecca Shoichet as Sugar Belle
- Matt Cowlrick as Rockhoof
- Garry Chalk as Prince Rutherford
- Christopher Gaze as Seaspray
- Kelly Metzger as Spitfire

==== Multiple roles ====
- Tabitha St. Germain as Princess Flurry Heart, Muffins, First Folio, Granny Smith, and Mrs. Cake
- Kazumi Evans as Moondancer, Rose, and Octavia Melody
- Richard Cox as Snails, Clump, and Grampa Gruff
- Scott Underwood as Rusty Bucket, Rogue, and Withers
- Nicole Oliver as Fume, Miss Cheerilee, and Dr. Fauna
- Peter New as Big McIntosh, Goldie Delicious, and Dr. Hooves
- Michael Dobson as Bulk Biceps and Dr. Caballeron/Martingale
- Ian Hanlin as Sunburst and Biff

=== Guest stars ===
- Meredith Salenger as Clear Sky
- Alice Oswalt as Wind Sprint
- Jackie Blackmore as Aunt Holiday
- Saffron Henderson as Auntie Lofty
- Emily Tennant as Mane Allgood
- Jesse Inocalla as Sans Smirk
- Kira Tozer as Fire Flare
- Connor Parnell as Biscuit
- Sabrina Pitre as Luster Dawn

== Episodes ==
As with the previous season, Denny Lu and Mike Myhre direct each episode.

No. overall	No. in season	Title	Written by	Original release date	Prod. code
196	1	"The Beginning of the End" (Parts 1 & 2)	Joanna Lewis & Kristine Songco	April 6, 2019	901
197	2	"The Beginning of the End" (Parts 1 & 2)	Joanna Lewis & Kristine Songco	April 6, 2019	902
Part 1: Twilight and her friends have been urgently called to Canterlot by Princess Celestia and Princess Luna, who announces that they are retiring from ruling Equestria and they want Twilight to take their place in a few days, which causes her to panic. Meanwhile, Queen Chrysalis, Lord Tirek, Cozy Glow, and a resurrected King Sombra are summoned by Grogar, an ancient evil ram and Equestria's original emperor, who proposes that they all work together to defeat Twilight and her friends and take over the kingdom. However, Sombra rejects Grogar's offer and sets out to reclaim the Crystal Empire on his own. Although he succeeds by enslaving everypony, including Shining Armor, Princess Cadance and Flurry Heart, Twilight and her friends arrive and easily defeat him with the Elements of Harmony. They venture back to the Tree of Harmony to return the Elements, but Sombra suddenly appears and destroys the Tree and the Elements. Part 2: Sombra reveals to Twilight and her friends that he faked his defeat in order to find and destroy the source of their powers. He traps them in the cave and moves on by claiming Ponyville, mind controlling all of the townsfolk and sending them all to lay siege on Canterlot. The group manage to escape and head their way to the town but are blocked by living plants from the Everfree Forest. Celestia and Luna arrive alongside Star Swirl to stop the plants as the group quickly head to Canterlot. Confronting Sombra, they are unable to fight back without the Elements, so Discord appears and easily outdoes his magic attacks, but is falsely injured after intercepting a full blast heading towards Fluttershy. After a sentimental speech from Discord, Twilight and her friends come together saying they are embodiments that represent friendship and that can never be taken away, and they defeat Sombra once more. Celestia and Luna congratulate them in their victory and apologize to Twilight for pushing their position too quickly onto her, stating that she will be ready when the time is right. Meanwhile, Grogar uses Sombra's defeat as a warning to the other villains to do things his way.
198	3	"Uprooted"	Nicole Dubuc	April 13, 2019	903
The Young Six are visited by a spiritual embodiment of Twilight, who says the Tree of Harmony needs them. After they learn from Twilight herself that the tree has been destroyed, they decide to memorialize it. However, they have conflicting and opposing plans to honor the tree, resulting in a big mess within the cave where it once stood. Yona urges the others to remember the tree as the thing that united them as friends, to which the group use its remains to build a tree house. Much to their surprise, a new tree bursts upward from the cave floor, tearing a hole in the ceiling and creating a new and even larger tree house on the grounds of the Castle of the Two Sisters. The spirit of the Tree appears before them, saying that the tree house can serve as a sanctuary for them and for future generations, and Twilight realizes the tree is still alive and adapting to be whatever Equestria needs.
199	4	"Sparkle's Seven"	Story by : Ashleigh Ball, Andrea Libman, Tabitha St. Germain, Tara Strong & Cathy Weseluck; Teleplay by : Josh Haber & Nicole Dubuc	April 20, 2019	904
Shining Armor summons Twilight to Canterlot to settle their childhood "Sibling Supreme" competition once and for all. Having implemented a new set of security measures around Canterlot Castle, he challenges Twilight to breach them and steal a toy crown from the throne room. Twilight devises a plan with her friends, only for Shining Armor to boast by letter that he has already guessed it, prompting Rarity to suggest that each member of the group do the opposite of what he expects. After all their plans fail, Spike urges Twilight to go ahead with her original strategy. They successfully reach the throne room, only to be intercepted by Shining Armor, Princess Celestia, and Princess Luna. As Shining Armor gloats over his victory, Spike suddenly reveals that he has the crown, which was passed to him by Luna, who had secretly agreed to help him following a disagreement with Celestia about improving the castle's security. Twilight and Shining Armor award the crown to Spike and acknowledge him as their little brother.
200	5	"The Point of No Return"	Gillian M. Berrow	April 27, 2019	905
While going through a box of her old things sent by Princess Celestia, Twilight finds a library book she borrowed years ago but never returned. Accompanied by Spike, she hurries to the Canterlot Library with the intent of returning it, but finds that the old librarian, Dusty Pages, no longer works there. Both Twilight and Dusty had perfect records in borrowing and maintaining books, respectively, and Twilight fears that the loss of this book cost Dusty her job. She and Spike track Dusty down to a retirement community and find her participating in several of its activities, but she firmly refuses to take the book or have anything to do with the library ever again. She explains that she was so worried about keeping her perfect record that she never had a chance to enjoy life. After the book went missing, she quit voluntarily and began to find happiness. Returning to Canterlot, Twilight pays the overdue fines and keeps the book as a reminder that there are more important things in life than trying to be perfect.
201	6	"Common Ground"	Josh Haber	May 4, 2019	906
While visiting Appleloosa to cheer on the Ponyville team in a buckball tournament, Rainbow Dash encounters Quibble Pants, who has started dating a unicorn mare named Clear Sky. Wind Sprint, her pegasus daughter by her late husband, enjoys the sport. Quibble knows nothing about it but buys her a buckball almanac and lets Rainbow Dash try to mold him into a sports enthusiast and athlete in an attempt to win her approval. Rainbow Dash's plan culminates in having Quibble, Wind and Snips play an exhibition game against Ponyville, but Quibble embarrasses himself badly with his ineptitude, prompting an exasperated Wind to storm off the field. He later apologizes to both Sky and Wind for trying too hard to impress them, and all three reconcile and settle down to enjoy the tournament with help from the almanac and Wind's knowledge of buckball.
202	7	"She's All Yak"	Brian Hohlfeld	May 11, 2019	907
The School of Friendship is hosting a party called the Amity Ball and Sandbar asks Yona if she wants to be his "Pony Pal" to the dance, which she agrees but thinks that she needs to act more like a pony to impress him, prompting herself to seek Rarity's advice on how to behave like a pony. Through several tactics, ranging from Rarity making her a dress and teaching her how to speak properly, Fluttershy and Rainbow Dash teaching her how to dance and Applejack and Pinkie Pie making her a dish to bring to the dance, Yona becomes a well-sophisticated "pony". However, while attending the dance, Yona ends up embarrassing herself when her enhancements become their own obstacles and exits the dance ashamed. Sandbar catches up to her and says that he invited her to the dance because he likes her for the yak she is. Touched by his words, Yona and Sandbar arrive back to the dance, the ponies apologize for turning Yona into something she is not, and Twilight declares them as the winners of the Pony Pal Contest.
203	8	"Frenemies"	Michael Vogel	May 18, 2019	908
Grogar tasks Chrysalis, Tirek, and Cozy Glow with retrieving his Bewitching Bell, that was taken from him long ago and hidden at the top of Mt. Everhoof, but warns them that they must work together to accomplish it. Scoffing at Cozy's plan to team up, Chrysalis and Tirek move ahead separately. However, Cozy fails to talk her way past a guard in an avalanche zone while Chrysalis is unable to fly up the mountain due to the high winds. Tirek has already recognized the futility of climbing the mountain alone. That evening, they argue with each other, but begin to get along over their shared hatred for Twilight and her friends. They reach the peak by working together and Tirek temporarily borrows Chrysalis' magic to open a force field protecting the bell so that Cozy could get it out. Despite their success, they reject the possibility of becoming friends and decide to hide the bell from Grogar, intending to use it to betray him.
204	9	"Sweet and Smoky"	Kim Beyer-Johnson	May 25, 2019	909
Accompanied by Fluttershy and Spike, Smolder takes a week off from class to visit and attempt to cheer up her brother in the Dragon Lands. To Spike and Fluttershy's dismay, however, her brother turns out to be Garble, who still delights in bullying Spike. Fluttershy and Smolder separately confront him and his friends over their behavior and Fluttershy later finds that Garble secretly enjoys writing beat poetry but is afraid to perform in public due to his fear of being ridiculed by his friends. Meanwhile, Ember is worried that a clutch of dragon eggs is taking far too long to hatch. Spike discovers that the ground is too cold to let the eggs develop and realizes that Garble's friends have been draining an underground lava reservoir so that they can surf and swim. Encouraged by Smolder, Garble performs his poetry for the other dragons, causing them to laugh so hard that they produce a fire hot enough to hatch the eggs. Ember proclaims that her subjects will start to celebrate their differences rather than make fun of them, and she and several other dragons ask Garble to teach them about writing poetry.
205	10	"Going to Seed"	Dave Rapp	June 1, 2019	910
The Apple family mobilize to bring in an enormous apple harvest, and Granny Smith calls in Goldie Delicious for additional help. Goldie tells Apple Bloom the story of the Great Seedling, a spirit that bestows bountiful crops on those who can catch it. Apple Bloom becomes determined to catch the Seedling, much to Applejack's dismay and annoyance. She had tried to catch it when she was young but got caught in one of her own traps and felt guilty for being unable to help with the harvest. Apple Bloom persuades Applejack to rekindle her old determination and help set up traps, leaving an extremely tired Big Mac to do more and more of the harvesting on his own. An apparition begins to chase the sisters through the orchards one night. It is revealed to be Big Mac, who has been harvesting in his sleep-in order to keep up with the workload. The harvest is finished ahead of schedule thanks to his night work, and Applejack comes to appreciate the importance of taking time off to have fun occasionally.
206	11	"Student Counsel"	Josh Haber	June 8, 2019	911
Starlight tries to spend the day with Trixie but has to keep leaving in order to help the students at the School of Friendship. She finally tires of the workload, sends the students home for spring break, and closes the campus so she and Trixie can attend a party at Maud's cave. Suddenly, Silverstream's brother Terramar arrives saying that she never made it home to Mount Aris, and he and Starlight find notes indicating that she had been doing research on cockatrices. Terramar, Starlight, Trixie, Sunburst, Maud and Mudbriar enter the Everfree Forest to search for Silverstream, but a flock of cockatrices chase after them and petrifies Mudbriar. As the group take shelter at the Castle of the Two Sisters, Starlight realizes that Silverstream must be at the crystal treehouse on its grounds. The group finds her there, safe and working on her research with the help of a cockatrice she has tamed and named Edith. She apologizes for not informing anyone of her plans, Mudbriar recovers from his petrifaction, and Starlight resolves not to let her professional responsibilities take over her life.
207	12	"The Last Crusade"	Nicole Dubuc	June 15, 2019	912
While the Cutie Mark Crusaders are hanging out at Scootaloo's house, she gets a postcard saying that her parents, Snap Shutter and Mane Allgood, are coming home. They travel extensively to study exotic wildlife, leaving Scootaloo in the care of her aunts Holiday and Lofty, among others. Scootaloo is overjoyed to see them, but they shock her with their plans to take her with them as they move to Shire Lanka for a new job. The Crusaders devise several strategies to keep Scootaloo in Ponyville, but Snap and Mane push ahead with their plans and sell their house in preparation for the move. During a visit to Holiday and Lofty, the Crusaders find that they have inspired Lofty to break through her creative drought and give a Crusader theme to a quilt she has been making. They return to Ponyville and Scootaloo leads her parents to a town-wide celebration of the Crusaders' success. Snap and Mane let Scootaloo stay in Ponyville, realizing that the Crusaders' work is as important as their own, and Holiday and Lofty decide to move to town so they can look after her.
208	13	"Between Dark and Dawn"	Gail Simone	June 22, 2019	913
Invigorated by their fight against the Everfree Forest, Princess Celestia and Princess Luna start to take an active role in solving problems around Ponyville. As they were becoming a nuisance, Twilight persuades them to take a vacation and leave her and her friends in charge of Equestria, the sun, and the moon for the duration. The group becomes overwhelmed with planning a royal ceremony until Twilight realizes the importance of delegating the work to experts so she and her friends can address more important issues. Meanwhile, tensions rise between Celestia and Luna over what sort of activities they should try, leading them to split up and take separate vacations. They eventually reconcile, admitting that they overreacted, and return to Canterlot to help Twilight move the sun and the moon properly.
209	14	"The Last Laugh"	Michael P. Fox & Wil Fox	August 3, 2019	914
After being invited to Cheese Sandwich's prank factory, Pinkie Pie takes the opportunity to discuss her purpose in life with him, dismayed that most of her friends are moving on. Upon her arrival, however, Cheese and his overly formal assistant, Sans Smirk, explain that Cheese has become unable to laugh ever since they started the factory to satisfy widespread demand for his novelties. Pinkie devises modifications to several of Cheese's pranks, but none of them make him laugh. She eventually realizes that he needs to see ponies laugh in person, and he regains his cheerful spirit after leading Sans and the employees in a factory-wide round of jokes. Cheese takes up his old role of a traveling party planner, leaving Sans in charge of the factory and promising to send back ideas for new products, and Pinkie returns to Ponyville with a new understanding of her purpose to make others happy.
210	15	"2, 4, 6, Greaaat"	Kaita Mpambara	August 10, 2019	915
After learning that Princess Celestia is starting an inter-scholastic buckball league, Twilight organizes a team at the School of Friendship. Rainbow Dash expects to coach it, but Twilight puts her in charge of the cheerleading squad instead, to her shock and dismay. Rainbow Dash does not care about cheerleading and initially leaves the squad, consisting of Ocellus, Smolder, Yona, and dancers Shimmy Shake and Lighthoof, to fend for themselves. She later gathers supplies for them from her friends, but still offers no help on effective cheering. The squad's first practice in front of the team is a disaster, and Smolder berates Rainbow Dash for not taking an interest even though the members and students do. Ashamed, Rainbow Dash rallies the squad and helps them coordinate their efforts to perform an energetic routine at the first game of the season.
211	16	"A Trivial Pursuit"	Brittany Jo Flores	August 17, 2019	916
Twilight is determined to become the first pony to win Trivia Trot, a Ponyville trivia contest, three times in a row. She is randomly paired up with Pinkie Pie, who has never played before, and the team soon falls behind due to Pinkie's stupidity. Worried that Pinkie is holding her back, Twilight begins to exploit the game's intricate rules in order to get the other teams penalized or disqualified, while distracting Pinkie so she can answer the questions herself. When Twilight tricks Pinkie into breaking the rules and getting herself disqualified, she pairs up with Sunburst, who takes over the game in order to keep up his own percentage of correct answers. They both realize that their drive to win has taken the fun out of the game, and Twilight apologizes to Pinkie and teams up with her again. Although they must give up their accumulated points and now have little chance of winning, they decide to have fun playing out the rest of the game.
212	17	"The Summer Sun Setback"	Michael Vogel	August 24, 2019	917
Chrysalis, Tirek, and Cozy Glow take advantage of Grogar's absence to sneak into Canterlot and collect information on how to use the Bewitching Bell, while Twilight begins to plan the Summer Sun Celebration, intending to make it special for Princess Celestia and Princess Luna since it will be the last one before their retirement. She delegates tasks to Spike, Discord, and her friends, while the villains sabotage the preparations to distract everypony in order to buy time so they can break into the Canterlot Archives and steal a book on the bell. After Twilight's friends fail to solve the problems on their own and keep them a secret from her, she takes charge and coordinates their efforts to get back on schedule. The Celebration goes off without any trouble, and Twilight renames it "The Festival of the Two Sisters" in Celestia and Luna's honor, as Discord comments she's ready for whatever comes next. Meanwhile, Chrysalis, Tirek, and Cozy return to Grogar's lair with the stolen book but realize that they have little time to master the bell for their own ends, while remarking how easy it was to turn all the ponies against one another and begin to plan something.
213	18	"She Talks to Angel"	Nick Confalone	August 31, 2019	918
As Fluttershy becomes increasingly busy at Sweet Feather Sanctuary, Angel becomes annoyed over her lack of time to spend with him and begins causing disturbances among the animals. While dropping off a smoke-belching gecko, which is really a fire lizard, for Fluttershy to examine, Zecora takes note of her strained relationship with Angel and suggests helping them understand each other's concerns better. When Fluttershy and Angel's feuding was getting worse, Zecora brews a potion that causes them to switch bodies. Angel, in Fluttershy's body, does a half-hearted job of looking after the animals, while Fluttershy, in Angel's body, is unable to tell anypony what has happened. Angel's lack of attention to the chores leads to chaos at the sanctuary, and Fluttershy exhausts herself seeking help. In order to revive her, Angel organizes the animals to retrieve a set of keys inhaled by a baby elephant who has in turn been swallowed whole by a python. Once Fluttershy regains consciousness, she and Angel reconcile, and the potion wears off. Angel offers to assist Fluttershy at the sanctuary, and she promises to make time for him.
214	19	"Dragon Dropped"	Josh Haber	September 7, 2019	919
When Spike decides to spend time apart from Rarity, she begins to worry that she has done something to offend him. However, she soon learns that he has been visiting Gabby, now that they have become pen pals, and she frequently delivers mail to Ponyville. Unable to get Spike's level of assistance and attention from her other friends, Rarity schemes to take up as much of Spike's time as she can with activities he enjoys. Gabby is heartbroken over his sudden abandonment of her, and Rarity sees the problem her own actions are causing. She apologizes to both of them, and all three acknowledge that the beginning of a new friendship does not mean the end of an existing one.
215	20	"A Horse Shoe-In"	Ariel Shepherd-Oppenheim	September 14, 2019	920
With her coronation approaching, Twilight decides to appoint Starlight as the new headmare for the School of Friendship. When Trixie comments that Twilight ran the school with her friends, Starlight decides to appoint a vice-headmare. Octavia Melody, Dr. Hooves, Big Mac, Spoiled Rich, and Trixie all apply for the position. As the interviews progress, Starlight realizes that Trixie is hopelessly unsuited for the job but does not reject her out of respect for their friendship. When Trixie endangers the students during an in-class field trip, Starlight furiously berates her for her carelessness. After Twilight reminds her that not everypony is right for a given job, Starlight apologizes to Trixie and acts on her suggestion to hire Sunburst as vice-headstallion after the remaining candidates withdraw their applications. Seeing that Trixie would make a good student counselor, Starlight appoints her to the position.
216	21	"Daring Doubt"	Nicole Dubuc	September 21, 2019	921
Surprised to learn from Fluttershy that a new Daring Do book has been published that presents an unflattering view of the explorer, Rainbow Dash and Fluttershy confront the author, who is actually Dr. Caballeron in disguise and who claims that the museum he runs has gone broke due to Daring Do's long-running thefts of artifacts from ancient sites. Fluttershy decides to join his team on their latest journey in order to decide for herself on who is telling the truth. During the entire trip, Caballeron begins to learn the importance of kindness from her. Rainbow Dash and Daring Do catch up to the team as Fluttershy recovers a talisman that forces its holder/wearer to tell the truth, but Ahuizotl suddenly traps all of them in an underground chamber. Upon escaping and finding Ahuizotl, the group learn that, under the talisman's influence, Ahuizotl's villainy was actually his job to guard the artifacts in the area from being stolen, to which Daring Do and Caballeron apologize to him and promise not to loot any more ruins. After Ahuizotl sets the group free, Daring Do and Caballeron put their differences aside and collaborate on a new book about their adventures, only for it to sell poorly due to Ahuizotl also having written one of his own.
217	22	"Growing Up is Hard to Do"	Ed Valentine	September 28, 2019	922
The Cutie Mark Crusaders want to go to a county fair in Appleloosa, but have not coordinated finding a chaperone, and Twilight and her friends are all too busy to accompany them and warn them against trying to make the trip on their own. When they voice their wish to become adults, a magical flower that Twilight and Fluttershy are studying grants it. They promptly board a train to Appleloosa, believing they now know everything they need, but mistakenly get off at the wrong station and soon become lost in some nearby swamps. There they meet two foals, Biscuit and Spur, who are arguing over whether to take their pet Whirling Mungtooth, Bloofy, to the fair. The Crusaders suggest they share the job of looking after Bloofy and follow them to the fair, but leave to enjoy themselves. Bloofy becomes overly agitated by the noise and crowds and grows into a dangerous whirlwind that the Crusaders are unable to stop, but by then, Twilight and Fluttershy had tracked them down, and Spur successfully calms Bloofy down with Fluttershy's help. Twilight subsequently has the Crusaders make another wish on the flower to return to their normal ages and then apologize to Biscuit and Spur for their deception, but also offer to visit them and Bloofy again. Biscuit and Spur agree, as long as a real adult accompanies them.
218	23	"The Big Mac Question"	Josh Haber & Michael Vogel	October 5, 2019	923
Without telling each other, Big Mac and Sugar Belle have devised unorthodox methods to propose marriage, both of which involved a clue-note scavenger hunt: Big Mac prepares a load of apples with clues to lead Sugar Belle to Sweet Apple Acres, while Sugar Belle writes notes for Mrs. Cake to insert into a batch of desserts she is making for Big Mac. Mrs. Cake's baking-under-pressure with the Cutie Mark Crusaders spoils the recipes, and both plans go awry after Spike and Discord get involved, with Discord mutating the apples horrendously so Sugar Belle will notice them, resulting in a giant monster that bellows Big Mac's proposal when Discord attempts to mend this, and Spike accidentally burning the already-spoiled desserts to a crisp. After both sides discover that they have been working at cross purposes, Big Mac and Sugar Belle propose to one another in private and happily accept, taking inspiration from the love that Big Mac's parents had for each other. Their wedding is held in the orchards, with Spike, Discord, Mrs. Cake and the Crusaders reflecting on how their mistakes combined to give such a happy outcome, though Discord gets the last laugh when he has the mutated apples sing at the wedding.
219	24	"The Ending of the End" (Parts 1 & 2)	Nicole Dubuc	October 12, 2019	924
220	25	"The Ending of the End" (Parts 1 & 2)	Michael Vogel	October 12, 2019	925
Part 1: On the day of Twilight's coronation, Chrysalis, Tirek and Cozy Glow successfully unlock the power of the Bewitching Bell, allowing them to use it to make themselves all-powerful. They betray Grogar and drain him of his magic, revealing him to be Discord in disguise. Discord travels to Canterlot and reveals this to Twilight and her friends while explaining that his actions as Grogar were intended to prepare Twilight for her new role. While everypony are horrified and furious at Discord for what he has done, Twilight rallies her friends and allies to prepare for the attack. The villains soon attack Equestria, with Cozy Glow invading Canterlot Castle and draining Princess Celestia and Princess Luna of their magic, Tirek defeating the Pillars, and Chrysalis ravaging the School of Friendship and capturing Starlight. They regroup at the castle, where they overpower Twilight and her friends and reveal that they have managed to turn the pony races against each other. After her friends insist that she retreat, Twilight teleports away while the others are overwhelmed by the villains. Part 2: Chrysalis, Tirek and Cozy Glow imprison the ponies and celebrate their victory but argue over what to do with the magic they have stolen. Discord enacts a plan to free Starlight so she can release the others, and they fend off the villains while Twilight's friends escape. They find Twilight taking refuge in the Crystal Empire, having lost hope of saving Equestria. Suddenly, the Windigos appear as a result of the hostility between the pony races, bringing forth freezing weather. Encouraged by her friends, Twilight regains her confidence, and they return to Canterlot to confront the villains. The villains gain the upper hand until a giant army consisting of all of Equestria and the other kingdoms, united by Twilight's students, appears to assist in the battle. Twilight unites the magic of friendship within her friends, the Young Six and the Pillars to evaporate the Windigos and strip the villains of their power, after which Celestia, Luna and Discord turn them into stone as punishment for their crimes. Proud of Twilight, Celestia states that she is officially ready to rule Equestria. Twilight postpones her coronation so she and her friends can spend some quiet time after the battle.
221	26	"The Last Problem"	Josh Haber	October 12, 2019	926
In a distant future, Twilight is visited by her top student, Luster Dawn, who does not understand the importance of friendship, so Twilight tells her a story of how she was once worried about losing her friendships. Flashing back to her coronation day, Twilight prepares to move back to Canterlot with Spike, but worries about drifting apart from her friends. However, her friends seem welcoming of this change and focus more on the final preparations for the ceremony. Twilight expresses her frustration about her friends' contentedness to her moving away, but they reveal that they do share her concerns and have been keeping themselves busy so they would not be sad about it either. They let out their feelings and cry together, which makes Twilight feel better, knowing that her friends feel the same way, but this causes them to fall behind on their preparations and almost missing the train to Canterlot. Twilight makes it just in time for her coronation, but the ceremony encounters many problems. After the group share a laugh about the disastrous ceremony, Twilight decides to establish a Council of Friendship so she can maintain her relationships with her friends by convening once every moon, while Celestia and Luna retire to Silver Shoals. Back in the future, Twilight finishes her story, and her friends arrive, revealing they have remained friends and are ruling Equestria together as the Council, while explaining to Luster that friendships can be hard to maintain, but life is even harder without them. Luster takes the lesson to heart and Twilight sends her to Ponyville, where she begins to make friends and have adventures of her own.
