= My Little Pony: Friendship Is Magic finale =

My Little Pony: Friendship Is Magic special

"The Ending of the End" and "The Last Problem"
- My Little Pony: Friendship Is Magic episodes
- From left to right: Pinkie Pie, Rainbow Dash, Applejack, Fluttershy, Twilight Sparkle, Rarity and Spike's final appearance in the series as they stand proudly on top of a hill in a distant future of Equestria.
- Episode nos.: Season 9 Episodes 24, 25 and 26
- Directed by: Denny Lu; Mike Myhre
- Written by: Nicole Dubuc ("The Ending of the End — Part 1"); Michael Vogel ("The Ending of the End — Part 2"); Josh Haber ("The Last Problem")
- Editing by: Josh Haber (story); Greg Canning (animatic); Tom Harris (online); Todd Araki (sound); Jason Fredrickson (sound); Roger Monk (sound); Andrew Spindor (sound)
- Original air date: October 12, 2019
- Running time: 66 minutes (combined)

Guest appearances
- Full list: John de Lancie as Discord; Sunni Westbrook as Cozy Glow; Mark Acheson as Lord Tirek; Doc Harris as Grogar; Matt Cowlrick as Rockhoof; Christopher Britton as Star Swirl the Bearded; Kyle Rideout as Thorax; Gavin Langelo as Gallus; Richard Ian Cox as Grandpa Gruff and Hyper Sonic; Devyn Dalton as Ocellus; Lauren Jackson as Silverstream and Berryshine; Garry Chalk as Prince Rutherford; Christopher Gaze as Seaspray; Sabrina Pitre as Luster Dawn

Episode chronology
← Previous "The Big Mac Question"	Next → —
- My Little Pony: Friendship Is Magic (season 9)

The three-part series finale of My Little Pony: Friendship Is Magic comprised the 24th to 26th episodes of the ninth season and the 219th to 221st overall: the two parts of "The Ending of the End" along with "The Last Problem". The finale aired in prime time on Discovery Family on October 12, 2019, two days after the series' ninth anniversary.

"The Ending of the End" follows Twilight Sparkle, Applejack, Rainbow Dash, Fluttershy, Rarity, Pinkie Pie—known collectively as the "Mane Six"— and their dragon friend Spike defending Equestria from their past enemies who are now united. "The Last Problem" is set years after the events of "The Ending of the End", wherein Twilight recounts her time with the Mane Six to one of her students experiencing a friendship problem.

== Plot ==
=== The Ending of the End — Part 1 ===
On the day of Twilight's coronation, Queen Chrysalis, Lord Tirek, and Cozy Glow successfully unlock the power of Grogar's Bewitching Bell, allowing them to use it to make themselves all-powerful. They then betray Grogar and drain him of his magic, revealing him to be Discord in disguise the whole time. Discord travels to Canterlot and reveals to Twilight and her friends that he was the one who brought back King Sombra earlier and united all their other sworn villains, while explaining that his actions as Grogar were intended to prepare Twilight for her new role to fight against them working together to prove how good she is. Despite Discord's good intentions, Twilight, her friends, Princess Celestia and Princess Luna are horrified and furious by his foolish actions and poor planning of uniting their enemies, so Twilight rallies her friends and allies to prepare for the attack. The villains attack Equestria, with Cozy Glow invading Canterlot Castle and draining Celestia and Luna of their magic, Tirek defeating the Pillars, and Chrysalis ravaging the School of Friendship and capturing Starlight Glimmer. They regroup at the castle, where they overpower Twilight and her friends and reveal that they have turned the pony races against each other, to prevent them from having any backup allies and spread distrust over the land so that the magic of friendship won't be strong enough to help them this time. The villains prepare to destroy Twilight, but gets saved by Rarity. After her friends insist that she retreat, Twilight teleports away while the others are overwhelmed by the villains.

=== The Ending of the End — Part 2 ===
Chrysalis, Tirek, and Cozy Glow imprison the ponies and celebrate their victory, but argue over what to do with the magic they have stolen. Discord, filled with remorse, enacts a plan to free Starlight so that she can release the others. Starlight, Princess Celestia, Princess Luna, Discord and the Pillars fend off the villains while Twilight's friends escape. As they search for Twilight, they find her taking refuge in the Crystal Empire having lost hope and fallen to despair, believing that the villains are right and have finally won. Suddenly, the Windigos return as a result of the hostility between the pony races and brings forth freezing weather. Encouraged by her friends, Twilight regains her confidence and they return to Canterlot to confront the villains. The Young Six manage to convince the pony races (as well as their own kingdoms) to end their re-formed strife towards each other in order to help Twilight and her friends save the day. The Mane Six fight the villains, as the odds are evenly matched until villains gain the upper hand when they cowardly take Spike hostage in a desperate attempt to make the Mane Six stand down. Just as they're about to finally defeat Twilight and her friends, a giant army consisting of all of Equestria and the other kingdoms, led by the Young Six, arrive to assist in the battle. Twilight stands up to the villains and unites the magic of friendship within her friends, the Young Six and the Pillars to evaporate the Windigos and strip the villains of their power, after which Celestia, Luna and Discord turn them into stone as punishment for their crimes, and so that they'll never harm the Mane Six ever again. Celestia expresses that she is proud of Twilight and that she is officially ready to rule Equestria. Twilight postpones her coronation so she and her friends can spend some quiet time after the battle.

=== The Last Problem ===
In a distant future, Twilight is visited by Luster Dawn, her top student at the School for Gifted Unicorns, who does not understand the importance of friendship, so she tells her a story of how she was once worried about losing her friendships. Flashing back to her coronation day, Twilight prepares to move back to Canterlot with Spike, but worries about drifting apart from her friends. However, her friends seem welcoming of this change and focus more on the final preparations for the ceremony. Twilight expresses her frustration about her friends' contentedness to her moving away and they reveal that they do share her concerns and have been using the preparations to distract themselves. They let out their feelings and cry together, which makes Twilight feel better, knowing that her friends feel the same way. This results in them getting behind on their preparations and almost missing the train to Canterlot. Twilight makes it just in time for her coronation, but the ceremony encounters many problems. After the group share a laugh about the disastrous ceremony, Twilight decides to establish a Council of Friendship so that she can maintain her relationships with her friends by convening once every moon, while Celestia and Luna retire to Silver Shoals.

Back in the future, as Twilight finishes her story, Luster assumes that she and her friends must've split up after the ceremony. However, she is proven wrong as Twilight friends arrive, revealing that they have remained friends and are ruling Equestria together as the Council of Friendship. Twilight explains to Luster that friendships can be hard to maintain, but life is even harder without them.

Luster takes the lesson to heart and Twilight sends her to Ponyville, where she begins to make friends and have adventures of her own. The last scene of the show features the book that opened in the first episode, now closing on a scene of the Mane Six and Spike standing happily on a hillside.

== Production ==
Supervising director Jim Miller considered it a "real honor to end the show properly and not just have it stop". He wanted to give the characters a "proper send-off", letting the viewers know what the characters were doing in the future and say goodbye. The finale was announced on September 12, 2019.

According to Miller, Discord impersonating Grogar was planned since the beginning of the season, as they wanted Chrysalis, Tirek and Cozy Glow to be the villains since they had more connection to the main characters.

== Broadcast ==
All three episodes were broadcast in a 90-minute "supersized" timeslot in prime time on October 12, 2019. Prior to their broadcast, Discovery Family aired My Little Pony: Friendship Is Magic — A Decade of Pony, a behind-the-scenes look on the production of the series, featuring interviews from the production crew and cast members, on October 11, 2019. For a week, a "Pony Palooza programming takeover" aired. It began on October 6, 2019, and featured the entire series.

== Reception ==
Screen Rant ranked "The Last Problem" the second-best season finale and third-best episode according to IMDb.

== Potential legacy ==
Composer Daniel Ingram hoped for the series to leave a legacy of first-rate children's entertainment as it "set a bar very high" within many categories, including storytelling, animation and character depth. Many crew members favorably regarded Friendship Is Magic as a once-in-a-lifetime experience.
