= Cozy Glow =

Fictional character from My Little Pony

- My Little Pony character
- Cozy Glow as she appears in "Frenemies"
- First appearance: "Marks for Effort" (2018)
- Created by: Nicole Dubuc
- Voiced by: Sunni Westbrook

In-universe information
- Species: Pegasus; Alicorn (finale)
- Affiliation: Lord Tirek; Queen Chrysalis; Grogar

Cozy Glow is a fictional character who appears in the fourth incarnation of Hasbro's My Little Pony toyline and media franchise, beginning with My Little Pony: Friendship Is Magic (2010–2019). She is voiced by Sunni Westbrook.

A precocious, manipulative, cunning, and power-hungry anthropomorphic pegasus filly, Cozy Glow initially introduces herself as a sweet and helpful student at Twilight Sparkle's School of Friendship. However, she is later revealed to be a calculating villain who schemes to drain all magic from Equestria in order to rule it herself.

== Appearances ==
=== Fourth My Little Pony incarnation (2010–2021) ===
==== My Little Pony: Friendship Is Magic ====
Cozy Glow first appears in the eighth season as a seemingly enthusiastic student at the School of Friendship. She befriends the Young Six while struggling with her friendship assignments. In "School Raze", Cozy secretly corresponds with the imprisoned Lord Tirek. She traps Twilight Sparkle and her friends in Tartarus and attempts to seize control of the school, believing that by eliminating magic, she can become the "Empress of Friendship". Her scheme is ultimately exposed by the Young Six, who defeat her with help from the Tree of Harmony, and she is subsequently imprisoned in Tartarus.

In the ninth season, Cozy forms an alliance with Queen Chrysalis and Tirek to conquer Equestria. In the series finale, they use the magic of the Bewitching Bell to grant themselves immense power, resulting in Cozy becoming an alicorn, and temporarily succeed in overtaking Equestria. However, they are eventually defeated by Twilight and her friends and turned to stone as punishment for their crimes by Celestia, Luna, and Discord. She is the youngest character in the show to receive that kind of punishment.

== Reception and analysis ==
Rob Clough of Looper described Cozy Glow as believing "that friendship is power" whose ultimate goal is to be an all-powerful Empress of Friendship. Carly Olsen of Screen Rant ranked the episode that featured Cozy Glow's exposure and defeat as the sixth best season finale of Friendship Is Magic. Author Stephanie Borges expressed shock at discovering "something so cute and adorable" could be so "damn evil" and described Cozy Glow as "a pesky little monster".

A study analyzing library representation in children's television series observed that Cozy Glow appeared in the School of Friendship library, organizing books on shelves as a pretext to spy on her fellow students' conversations.

Due to the backstory of Cozy Glow not being explored in the show at all, the brony fandom has developed multiple headcanons about her origins and motivations.

== See also ==
- List of My Little Pony: Friendship Is Magic characters
