= Twilight's Kingdom =

- My Little Pony: Friendship Is Magic episodes
- Lord Tirek (pictured) battling Twilight Sparkle who is trying to restore magic and save Equestria
- Episode nos.: Season 4 Episodes 25 & 26
- Directed by: Jayson Thiessen (supervising); Jim Miller (co-director)
- Written by: Meghan McCarthy
- Editing by: Margaret Reid; Meghan McCarthy (story)
- Original air date: May 10, 2014
- Running time: 44 minutes (combined)

Guest appearances
- Mark Acheson as Lord Tirek; John de Lancie as Discord

Episode chronology
← Previous "Equestria Games"	Next → "The Cutie Map" "My Little Pony: Equestria Girls: Rainbow Rocks"
- My Little Pony: Friendship Is Magic (season 4)

"Twilight's Kingdom" is the collective name for the twenty-fifth and twenty-sixth episodes of the fourth season of the animated television series My Little Pony: Friendship Is Magic, as well as the ninetieth and ninety-first episodes of the series overall. The two-part season finale deals with a new threat named Lord Tirek, who wants to rule Equestria by absorbing all magic, as well as Twilight Sparkle trying to learn what she should do with her new role as a princess. "Twilight's Kingdom" was directed by Jayson Thiessen, co-directed by Jim Miller, produced by Sarah Wall and Devon Cody, and written by Meghan McCarthy. It premiered on the Hub Network on May 10, 2014, with both parts airing back-to-back.

The character of Tirek went through many revisions to make him look scary, but not frighten children. Storyboarding the episodes' battle scene was also difficult as the crew needed to correctly focus on the timing, gravity, and movement. The episodes garnered acclaim from critics, who praised the villain and themes. According to Nielsen household ratings, the first part had 677,000 viewers and the second part had 788,000 viewers.

== Plot ==
Princess Twilight Sparkle and her friends travel to the Crystal Empire, where Twilight is to help greet delegates from another nation. She finds this duty unfulfilling, and laments this to Celestia, Luna, and Cadance, unsure what her role in Equestria is. The other three assure her that her responsibilities will become clear in time.

Celestia has a vision revealing that an evil centaur named Lord Tirek has escaped from Tartarus and is now draining ponies of their magic. Gathering the other princesses, Celestia explains how they had stopped Tirek before and that they must stop him now before he becomes too powerful. The other princesses turn to an eager Twilight to deal with Tirek, but Celestia instead puts Discord in charge due to his ability to sense magical imbalances that will be caused by Tirek's activity. Twilight returns home to Ponyville, disappointed at being unable to help, and heads to the castle ruins with her friends in the Everfree Forest to catch up on studying. Discord interrupts them, teases them about his mission, and reminds them of the locked chest at the base of the Tree of Harmony (from "Princess Twilight Sparkle"). Twilight suspects there may be something to help against Tirek inside, and she and her friends search the books in the castle. Twilight realizes Discord mentioned their shared journal, and finds stories written by the other five where they were challenged in regard to their core Element of Harmony, and were able to help another, receiving an item in return. They gather these items, which transform into five of the six keys needed to open the box, but Twilight realizes that she can't give the last key as she has not yet faced a challenge similar to theirs.

Discord encounters Tirek, but he tempts him with having freedom over friendship, so Discord decides to join forces with Tirek and reverts to his old ways. Twilight is summoned back to Canterlot, where Celestia reveals Discord's treachery, and that Tirek now has his sights set on taking the princesses' magic for himself.

Celestia reveals that the best plan to prevent Tirek from getting the alicorn magic is to hide it away within Twilight since her recent ascension is still unknown to Tirek. They transfer their powers to Twilight, who has difficulty in controlling the power and avoids her friends on returning to Ponyville to practice control over the magic.

Tirek confronts the princesses and finds their magic gone. Despite this, he mocks their plan and traps the three in Tartarus. He then expresses his gratitude for Discord's help by giving him a medallion as a sign of loyalty. As they discuss this, Tirek learns of Twilight's existence and sets off to Ponyville. With Discord's assistance, they trap Twilight's friends and Tirek steals their power. Afterward, he turns on Discord and takes his magic as well, having only used Discord as a pawn to become powerful as he tells him he is no longer useful to him. Tirek finds Twilight and when she tries to run away, he destroys the Golden Oak Library in Ponyville. Enraged, Twilight attacks Tirek and after a battle between the two superpowered beings, they realize they are evenly matched, and Tirek offers to release Twilight's best friends in exchange for the alicorn magic. Twilight, realizing this is the same type of situation that her best friends had previously experienced, agrees on the condition that her friends and Discord are freed. Tirek then drains Twilight of the alicorn magic and begins to go on a rampage.

Remorsefully, Discord apologizes and gives Twilight the medallion to show he really has changed. Twilight recognizes this as the sixth key, and they quickly race to the box. With all six keys present, the box opens and powers the Tree of Harmony, causing Twilight and her friends to be infused with a rainbow-like power. Together, they face Tirek, repulse his attacks and revert the magic drain. Tirek is weakened to his frail form and returned to Tartarus while Twilight and her best friends return the magic to the ponies and free the princesses. Subsequently, the box travels into the ground at the edge of Ponyville and grows into a tree-like castle. Celestia informs Twilight that since she is now the Princess of Friendship, her responsibility is to continue helping spread friendship across Equestria with the help of her best friends, including Discord.

== Production ==
The main villain in "Twilight's Kingdom" is Lord Tirek; he is based on a centaur, with the head, arms, and chest of a human; and legs, hindquarters, and tail of a horse. However, since humans do not exist in Friendship Is Magic, Tirek's head bears more similarity to a bull and has whiskers comparable to a goat's. Phil Caesar of DHX Media consulted his ten-year-old daughter when designing Tirek, "push[ing] the limits as far as [he could]". Afterward, the directors examined the design and decided if it was "too much or too little", giving Caesar a point to work off from. According to Brian Lenard of Hasbro Studios, Tirek's body was initially nearly all red. However, they changed the color of his upper body to black, which made Tirek appear less intense and the more expressive parts of his body—the face and arms—more prominent.

According to Timothy Packford of DHX Media, storyboarding action scenes, such as the one in "Twilight's Kingdom", was difficult since the stories' important points might be lost. Storyboarding, as well as the intent, needed to be clear. Episodes with large amounts of dialogue can "sort of slog and grind because there's so much talking". A crucial point was to keep the shots interesting and have a good flow from one to the next. However, actions sequences were inclined to have more cuts rather than dialogue. They focused on movement and kinetic energy, as well as timing and gravity.

== Broadcast and reception ==
=== Ratings ===
Both parts of "Twilight's Kingdom" aired back-to-back on the Hub Network on May 10, 2014. They were preceded by a marathon of episodes from season four. The first part of the finale was viewed by 677,000 viewers and was watched by approximately 0.3 percent of households in the United States, according to the Nielsen household ratings. The second part of the finale was viewed by 788,000 viewers and, also according to the Nielsen household ratings, was watched by approximately 0.4 percent of American households.

=== Critical reception ===
The two episodes received critical acclaim. An Entertainment Weekly writer graded them an A−, describing the two as carrying "a Frozen-y empowering theme (and a sly Godfather reference)". James Zahn from The Rock Father considered the finale "an exciting pair of episodes", adding that "fans of My Little Pony will be discussing these episodes for some time to come." Zahn commended Tirek's character, calling him exciting and favorably comparing him to several animated villains of the 1980s. Daniel Alvarez on Unleash the Fanboy gave the finale a ten out of ten and called it a masterpiece, praising the general pacing and writing of the episodes. He also considered Tirek a "brilliant antagonist, by far, the best villain the show has seen yet", and positively likened the battle between Twilight and Tirek to Dragon Ball Z.

The episodes are considered one of the best My Little Pony episodes. Screen Rant ranked the first and second parts the fourth and sixth-best episodes as well as the third-best season finale according to IMDb. Writing for TheWrap, Johnnie Jungleguts listed the two-parter as the best episode of the My Little Pony franchise due to its entwined plot lines and lore.

== Featured songs ==
#	Title	Music	Lyrics	Performer(s) (character)	Backing vocals
1	"You'll Play Your Part"	Daniel Ingram	Daniel Ingram and Meghan McCarthy	Rebecca Shoichet (Twilight Sparkle), Nicole Oliver (Celestia), Kazumi Evans (Luna), and Britt McKillip (Cadance)	-
2	"Let the Rainbow Remind You"	Daniel Ingram	Daniel Ingram and Meghan McCarthy	Rebecca Shoichet (Twilight Sparkle) and Andrea Libman (Fluttershy)	Ashleigh Ball (Rainbow Dash, Applejack), Shannon Chan-Kent (Pinkie Pie), Kazumi Evans (Rarity)

== Home media ==
The two-part finale is part of The Keys of Friendship DVD, which was released on July 29, 2014. The episode was also part of the Season 4 DVD, which was released on December 2, 2014.
