= Lord Tirek =

Fictional character from My Little Pony

- My Little Pony character
- Lord Tirek as he appears in "Twilight's Kingdom – Part 2" after absorbing the magic of Discord and Twilight's friends
- First appearance: "Twilight's Kingdom" (2014)
- Created by: Meghan McCarthy; Phil Caesar
- Based on: Tirac from My Little Pony: Rescue at Midnight Castle
- Voiced by: Mark Acheson

In-universe information
- Species: Centaur
- Affiliation: Cozy Glow; Queen Chrysalis; Grogar
- Family: Scorpan (brother); King Vorak (father); Queen Haydon (mother)

Lord Tirek (/ˈtɪrɛk/ TIRR-ek) is a fictional character who appears in the fourth incarnation of Hasbro's My Little Pony toyline and media franchise, beginning with My Little Pony: Friendship Is Magic (2010–2019). He serves as a recurring antagonist throughout the series, first appearing in the fourth season finale. He is voiced by Mark Acheson.

A powerful and malevolent centaur who seeks to absorb all magic in Equestria to gain ultimate power, Tirek has the ability to drain magic from ponies, transforming him from a weak, elderly creature into a massive, intimidating beast. Tirek is based on the original Tirac from the 1984 television special Rescue at Midnight Castle.

== Appearances ==
=== Fourth My Little Pony incarnation (2010–2021) ===
==== My Little Pony: Friendship Is Magic ====
A thousand years ago, Tirek once came to Equestria with his brother Scorpan, intending to conquer the land, but Scorpan was reformed by the friendship of ponies and warned Princess Celestia and Princess Luna of Tirek's plans, which led to him being imprisoned in the realm of Tartarus.

Tirek first appears in the fourth-season finale "Twilight's Kingdom" when he escapes from Tartarus, and begins draining magic from ponies across the land, growing larger and stronger with each absorption. His actions forces Celestia, Luna, and Cadance to transfer their magic to Twilight Sparkle to keep it safe, temporarily giving her immense power. After engaging Twilight in an intense magical battle, Tirek captures her friends and uses them as leverage to force her to surrender her alicorn magic in exchange for their safety. However, when Twilight and her friends are reunited, Discord gives her a medallion he had previously received from Tirek, which Twilight recognizes as the sixth key needed to open a mysterious box connected to the Tree of Harmony. With all six keys present, the box opens and powers the Tree of Harmony, infusing Twilight and her friends with rainbow-colored powers that allow them to defeat the now-giant Tirek and restore all the stolen magic to Equestria, results in his re-imprisonment in Tartarus.

Tirek returns in the eighth season finale "School Raze" where he consults with Cozy Glow in draining magic from Equestria. In the ninth season, Tirek forms an alliance with Queen Chrysalis and Cozy to conquer Equestria. In the series finale, they use the magic of the Bewitching Bell to grant themselves immense power and temporarily succeed in overtaking Equestria. However, they are eventually defeated by Twilight and her friends, and turned into stone as punishment for their crimes by Celestia, Luna, and Discord.

== Development ==
The nemesis in Season 4's "Princess Twilight Sparkle" episodes is Tirek. How scary can you get? I go as scary as I can, then we take a look and say, okay, maybe that's too scary. I have a ten-year-old daughter and really bounce a lot of this stuff off of her. She'll say, "That's too scary" or "That's not scary enough," or "That's funny" or "That's not funny." Basically, I push the limits as far as I can. Then the directors look at it, and we all decide if it's too much or too little and go from there.

— Phil Caesar, My Little Pony: The Art of Equestria

Character designer Phil Caesar strove to make Tirek appear as intimidating as he could without being deemed "too scary" for younger audiences, giving him design elements such as a black upper body to "tone down the intensity". Tirek's body was initially almost completely red, but was ultimately changed to have his upper body black due to concerns that it would be too scary to younger audiences.

According to Brian Lenard, an executive at Hasbro Studios,

"The artists at DHX take a first pass at color for character designs and then send to Hasbro Studios for review. Initially, Tirek's body was almost entirely red, but we felt it made him feel too scary, which is saying a lot because his design is already pretty intimidating! We suggested coloring his upper body black, which helped tone down the intensity and had the added benefit of drawing your eye to the most expressive parts of his body: the face and arms."

== Reception and analysis ==
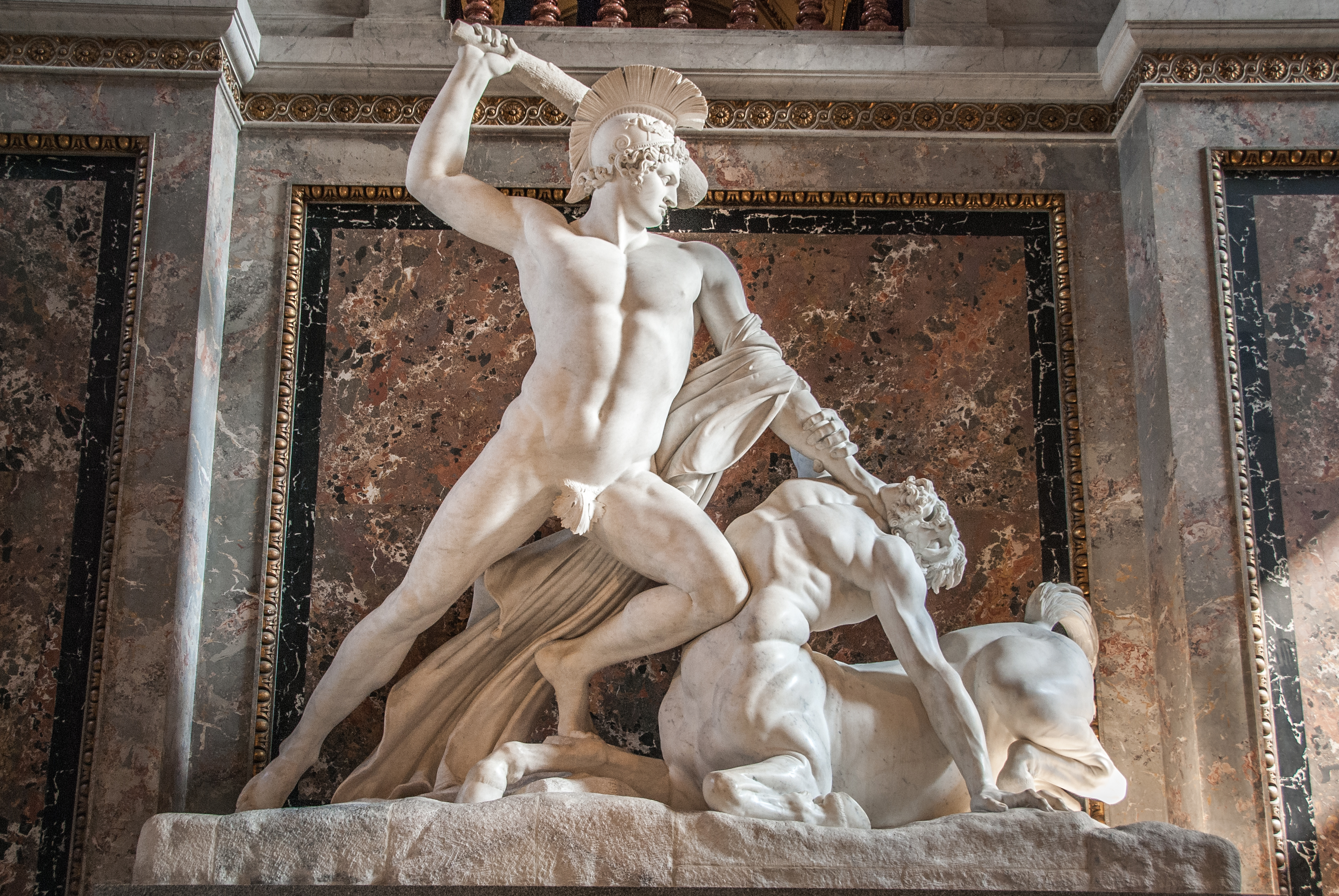
Theseus Defeats the Centaur by Antonio Canova (1804–1819), Kunsthistorisches Museum

According to author Priscilla Hobbs, Tirek's characterization draws heavily from classical Greek mythology, particularly the centauromachy tradition found in Ovid's works. Hobbs described Tirek's actions of stealing magic from ponies as a "symbolic rape" comparable to the drunken centaur Eurytus's assault on Pirithous's bride; the Mane Six take on the role of Theseus in confronting this transgression. Observing that Tirek's imprisonment in Tartaros positions him as representing "primal forces" that preceded civilized order, similar to the chthonic deities who were displaced by the Olympians, Hobbs argued that Tirek's characterization as "drunk on power" and his subsequent banishment follows the classical pattern of centaurs being either killed or exiled for their transgressions, thus restoring harmony to Equestria.

Einari Ollikainen wrote that the Season 4 finale battle between Tirek and Twilight was reminiscent of Japanese fighting anime. Ollikainen observed that many fans in live chat discussions during the episode's broadcast directly compared the battle to Akira Toriyama's Dragon Ball series and noted that the energy beams used by both Tirek and Twilight resembled the Kamehameha technique. Ollikainen remarked that the intensity and scale of the Tirek confrontation was unexpected for a children's show.

A study by Christian Valiente and Xeno Rasmusson examining gender roles in Friendship Is Magic analyzed Tirek's confrontation with Twilight Sparkle in "Twilight's Kingdom". They observed that the battle sequence between Tirek and Twilight featured elements typically associated with male-oriented action media: "matching blows, firing massive lasers, and taking tremendous physical damage." The researchers compared the extended action sequence involving Tirek to "boy-centric anime like Dragonball Z", a major departure from conventional expectations for girls' programming. Valiente and Rasmusson questioned whether such sequences transformed the show into "a super-cute action drama that just happens to feature girls in lead roles" rather than traditional girls' entertainment.

Author Jen A. Blue analyzed Tirek's role through the lens of Kabbalistic mysticism and creation mythology. Blue interpreted Tirek as representing primordial darkness that seeks to reclaim the light it once contained, as his belief that Equestria's magic rightfully belongs to him reflects "a memory of a time before the Dark." Blue described Tirek as fundamentally destructive since "he combines nothing" but instead "snatches and devours" magic from others. Blue positioned Tirek's ultimate goal as severing the world's connection to divine light by destroying the Tree of Harmony, with Blue describing his post-defeat state as "hungry, nasty, and weak, able to wield only stolen power."

== See also ==
- List of My Little Pony: Friendship Is Magic characters
- Elements of Harmony

== Bibliography ==
- Begin, Mary Jane (2015). My Little Pony: The Art of Equestria. New York: Abrams. ISBN 978-1-4197-1577-8.
- Snider, Brandon T. (2017). The Elements of Harmony Volume II: My Little Pony: Friendship Is Magic: The Official Guidebook Volume II. New York: Little, Brown and Company. ISBN 978-0-316-43197-2.
