= Fluffle =

Fluffle or Fluffles may refer to:

- Fluffle, a small furry creature named Pogie, character in Dizzy (series) of video games
- Fluffles, a poodle character in Wallace & Gromit: A Matter of Loaf and Death animated film
- A group of bunnies, a term originally added to Wikipedia as a prank, but later adopted into actual usage

== See also ==
- Fluffle Puff, Tumblr blog Ask Fluffle Puff character
