= Grannies Gone Wild =

- My Little Pony: Friendship Is Magic episode
- Episode no.: Season 8 Episode 5
- Directed by: Denny Lu; Mike Myhre; Jim Miller (supervising)
- Written by: Gillian M. Berrow
- Original air date: April 14, 2018
- Running time: 22 minutes

Guest appearances
- Marcy Goldberg as Apple Sauce; Shirley Millner as Apple Rose; Alex Zahara as Jack Pot; Peter Kelamis as Carnival Barker and Resort Pony; Tariq Leslie as Big Bucks; Matt Hill as Soarin

Episode chronology
← Previous "Fake It 'Til You Make It"	Next → "Surf and/or Turf"
- My Little Pony: Friendship Is Magic season 8

"Grannies Gone Wild" is the fifth episode of the eighth season of animated television series My Little Pony: Friendship Is Magic as well as the 174th overall. The episode follows Rainbow Dash, who is eager to ride the Wild Blue Yonder, a famous roller coaster in Las Pegasus, before it permanently closes. However, in return for having Applejack take over her classes at the School of Friendship, she reluctantly agrees to chaperone Granny Smith and her elderly relatives on their annual Las Pegasus vacation. This proves difficult as Rainbow Dash constantly annoys the grannies by interfering with their exciting activities per Applejack's instructions.

"Grannies Gone Wild" features a cameo from the titular characters of adult animated series Rick and Morty. Many writers found this crossover bizarre and surprising, given the contrasts between the two shows. Fan response was polarising, with some considering it inappropriate and others pointed out that the crew members opted to pay homage to Rick and Morty.

== Plot ==
Rainbow Dash is eager to ride the Wild Blue Yonder, a famous roller coaster in Las Pegasus, before it permanently closes. Applejack agrees to take over her classes at the School of Friendship if she chaperones Granny Smith and her elderly relatives for their annual Las Pegasus vacation, strictly instructing Rainbow Dash to never let them overexert themselves or leave her sight. Rainbow Dash reluctantly accepts, and attempts to convince the grannies to rest in their hotel so she can have time for herself. However, the grannies sneak off while Rainbow Dash discovers the coaster's long waiting line, forcing her to spend most of the day following them and interfering with their exciting activities, much to their annoyance. When Rainbow Dash apologizes for ruining their fun and explains she is only following Applejack's instructions, the grannies laugh over Applejack's overprotectiveness and invite Rainbow Dash to ride the coaster with them, using their VIP passes to skip the line.

== Background ==
Rick Sanchez (grey pony with spiky blue hair) and Morty Smith (yellow pony with brown hair) waiting in line with other ponies for the Wild Blue Yonder

Denny Lu and Mike Myhre directed the episode, with Jim Miller supervising. Most of the episode's screenplay was written at the Mirage, a casino resort in Las Vegas, by Gillian M. Berrow. The titular characters of adult animated series Rick and Morty make a cameo in the episode. They appear as ponies waiting in line for the Wild Blue Yonder and, according to Comic Book Resources, have their signature features: Rick Sanchez—a sociopathic scientist in his original series—wears his lab coat, and has his blue spiky hair and grey fur; Morty Smith—his delicate grandson—has a fur color that is the same as his yellow shirt and an anxious expression. Screen Rant noted that Rick's cutie mark is a chemistry flask, signifying his skills in science. This cameo was first noticed by Reddit user "Roxopenguim". Before "Grannies Gone Wild" aired, a YouTuber envisioned this crossover.

== Broadcast and reception ==
The episode aired on April 14, 2018, on Discovery Family. Corey Plante, writing for Inverse, thought negatively of its lesson, saying, "In some ways, Friendship Is Magic can be even more fucked-up than Rick and Morty." Many writers found the cameos of Rick and Morty bizarre and unexpected. Dan Seddon of Digital Spy said that considering the significant tonal contrasts between the two shows, this cameo was not the same as other everyday ones. From Comic Book Resources, Nicole Herviou stated that Friendship Is Magic is "the last animated series you'd expect" and "a rather random" place for the cameo, and it "seems like a really wild thing". Plante found it especially strange since Rick and Morty is "fucked up".

Fan response was polarised. Some people were offended by the thought of a children's animation presenting Rick and Morty in pony form as a joke. Others criticized them for complaining about how the wrong people evidently appreciated the same item as them and opted to pay homage to it in their work.
