= Queen Chrysalis =

Fictional character from My Little Pony

- My Little Pony character
- Queen Chrysalis as she appears in "Frenemies"
- First appearance: "A Canterlot Wedding" (2012)
- Last appearance: 9 season (2019)
- Created by: Meghan McCarthy; Rebecca Dart
- Voiced by: Kathleen Barr

In-universe information
- Species: Changeling
- Occupation: Queen of the Changelings (formerly)
- Affiliation: Lord Tirek; Cozy Glow; Grogar; Changeling Hive (formerly)
- Fighting style: Magic,changing her form and making clones
- Family: Changelings (subjects, formerly)

Queen Chrysalis is a fictional character who appears in the fourth incarnation of Hasbro's My Little Pony toyline and media franchise, beginning with My Little Pony: Friendship Is Magic (2010–2019). She serves as a major antagonist throughout the series, first appearing in the second season finale. She is voiced by Kathleen Barr.

A malevolent and manipulative anthropomorphic changeling (a shapeshifting insect-like creature) who rules over a hive of changelings, Queen Chrysalis possesses powerful magic abilities including shapeshifting, mind control, and the ability to feed on love and positive emotions. Throughout the series, she is a significant threat to Equestria and the Mane Six, and serves as Twilight Sparkle's arch-nemesis.

== Appearances ==
=== Fourth My Little Pony incarnation (2010–2021) ===
==== My Little Pony: Friendship Is Magic ====
Chrysalis first appears in the second season finale "A Canterlot Wedding", where she impersonates Princess Cadance and imprisoned her in the caves beneath Canterlot. Having disguised herself to infiltrate Cadance and Shining Armor’s wedding, Chrysalis planned to feed on Shining Armor's love and use him to lower Canterlot's magical defenses, allowing her changeling army to invade and conquer the city. Her plan is ultimately foiled when Cadance is freed and she and Shining Armor use the power of their love to repel Chrysalis and her army from Canterlot.

In the ninth season, Chrysalis forms an alliance with Lord Tirek and Cozy Glow to conquer Equestria. In the series finale, they use the magic of the Bewitching Bell to grant themselves immense power and temporarily succeed in overtaking Equestria. However, they are eventually defeated by Twilight and her friends, and turned into stone as punishment for their crimes by Celestia, Luna, and Discord.

== Development ==
When I designed Queen Chrysalis for "A Canterlot Wedding" in Season 2, initially she was drawn as being wet and hunched over, and it made her look weak and a bit Gollumesque. I also wanted to make her look rotten, like she crawled out from under a log, because she's buglike-that's why she's all moth-eaten and full of holes... I saw a note from Hasbro that said she wasn't scary enough, so I had to do a special pose of her rearing up to prove that she could be a super villain. Just putting her upright made her more commanding.

— Rebecca Dart, My Little Pony: The Art of Equestria

Character designer Rebecca Dart drew Chrysalis and the other changelings with an insect-like design after reading the character's name in the script, drawing inspiration from manga artists Junko Mizuno and Hideshi Hino. According to Ridd Sorensen, the art director of Friendship Is Magic, he enjoyed working with Dart in creating the character, though "all [he] had to do was approve the amazing design".

== Reception and analysis ==
Media scholar Kevin Fletcher analyzed Queen Chrysalis's portrayal in "A Canterlot Wedding" within the context of gender representation in children's media. Fletcher argued that the character's behavior while impersonating Princess Cadance could be interpreted regressively, similar to evil Disney queens, noting that her transformation at the wedding to her true form, which he described as "a decaying mare with insect wings", is visually inspired by Maleficent's transformation in Disney's Sleeping Beauty. He also analyzed her role as ruler of the changeling hive, observing that the Changeling Kingdom resembles a termite mound and referencing feminist science fiction writer Joanna Russ's observation that matriarchal societies in science fiction are often modeled on termites. Fletcher interpreted Queen Chrysalis's song lyric "Who says a girl can't have it all?" as demonstrating the show's awareness of post-feminist discourse around "having it all" while associating this concept with villainy.

A study by Christian Valiente and Xeno Rasmusson identified Queen Chrysalis as an example of the show's challenge to traditional gender stereotypes by featuring female characters as both heroes and villains. In their analysis of "A Canterlot Wedding," the researchers observed that despite the presence of male characters including an army of male changelings, "the main dialogue and action belong to the females Twilight and the shape shifter," with Queen Chrysalis driving the plot forward while male characters are "rendered inept or under the command of females." They remarked that the show consistently depicts "girl characters as the menacing villains" alongside female heroes.

Author Jen A. Blue wrote that Chrysalis represents pure power without the capacity for love, citing the character's song "This Day Aria" where she declares "No, I do not love the groom / In my heart there is no room / But I still want him to be all mine!" Blue wrote that Chrysalis lacks any humanizing desires beyond the need to possess, control, and dominate others. According to Blue, the episode presents love as a potent force against power, with the changelings representing creatures of power and manipulation who are ultimately defeated when Cadance and Shining Armor's genuine love overcomes Chrysalis's control.

== In popular culture ==
Queen Chrysalis has become a popular subject within the brony fandom. Academic research has documented positive fan identification and intensive parasocial relationships with the character. The character quickly became a subject of fan art following her debut. For example, fan art titled "Chrysalis Hearts" was posted on DeviantArt within days of the character's first appearance, with the artist captioning it "our lovely new queen". Fans described her as "evil yet charming" and praised her complex scheme to take over Equestria.

Queen Chrysalis has been featured in other fan-created content, such as the popular Tumblr blog Ask Fluffle Puff, which features a fictional relationship between Chrysalis and an original character named Fluffle Puff.

== See also ==
- List of My Little Pony: Friendship Is Magic characters

== Bibliography ==
- Begin, Mary Jane (2015). My Little Pony: The Art of Equestria. New York: Abrams. ISBN 978-1-4197-1577-8.
- Snider, Brandon T. (2013). The Elements of Harmony: My Little Pony: Friendship Is Magic: The Official Guidebook. New York: Little, Brown and Company. ISBN 978-0-316-24754-2.
