= My Little Pony (2010 toyline) =

Fourth incarnation of My Little Pony toyline and media franchise

- Logo used since 2016
- Original work: Toys
- Owner: Hasbro
- Years: 2010–2021

Print publications
- Comics: IDW Publishing My Little Pony: Friendship Is Magic My Little Pony: Micro Series My Little Pony: Friends Forever My Little Pony: Legends of Magic special issues Shogakukan My Little Pony: Friendship Is Magic by Akira Himekawa Seven Seas Entertainment My Little Pony: The Manga – A Day in the Life of Equestria

Films and television
- Film: My Little Pony: The Movie (2017)
- Animated series: My Little Pony: Friendship Is Magic (2010–2019); My Little Pony: Stop Motion Shorts (2020); My Little Pony: Pony Life (2020–2021)
- Television specials: My Little Pony: Best Gift Ever (2018); My Little Pony: Rainbow Roadtrip (2019)

Games
- Video game(s): Gameloft My Little Pony: Friendship Is Magic (2012) Outright Games My Little Pony: A Maretime Bay Adventure (2022)

Miscellaneous
- Toy: My Little Pony
- Spin-off franchise: My Little Pony: Equestria Girls

Official website
- mylittlepony.hasbro.com/en-us

American toy company Hasbro launched the fourth incarnation of its My Little Pony toyline and media franchise in 2010. This incarnation is unofficially known among collectors as the Generation 4 (G4). Additionally, some later toy releases bear the subtitle "Friendship Is Magic" from the flagship television series.

Media in this incarnation includes the television series My Little Pony: Friendship Is Magic (2010–2019), the feature film My Little Pony: The Movie (2017), and the television specials Best Gift Ever (2018) and Rainbow Roadtrip (2019). Hasbro introduced caricatured redesigns of the toys in November 2019, and supported the revamp with the animated series Pony Life (2020–2021) and a stop-motion animated web series in January 2020.

The toys and media of the fourth incarnation are set in the fictional kingdom of Equestria, home to three kinds of ponies (earth ponies, unicorns and pegasi) and other species, with winged unicorns – named "alicorns" in later releases despite the word's origin – having royal status.

With the success of the Friendship is Magic television series, it also generated a dedicated fandom. The line grossed over US$650 million in retail sales in 2013, and $1 billion annually in retail sales in 2014, and 2015. This era also has an anthropomorphic fashion doll spin-off, subtitled Equestria Girls.

== Toys ==
My Little Pony
- Other names: My Little Pony: Friendship Is Magic; My Little Pony: The Movie; My Little Pony: Guardians of Harmony
- Company: Hasbro
- Country: United States
- Availability: 2010–2019
- Official website

The toyline often features ten characters – Twilight Sparkle, Rainbow Dash, Fluttershy, Pinkie Pie, Applejack, Rarity, Spike, Princess Celestia, Princess Luna and Princess Cadance– who are also the major protagonists in the Friendship Is Magic television series and other related media.

Beginning in 2013, the toys of Twilight Sparkle (originally a unicorn) were modified to have a pair of wings as well, a move that sparked criticism. Other official media followed the suit to reflect that, with Friendship Is Magic television series having a dedicated episode as a finale of season 3, and IDW's Friendship Is Magic comics reflecting the change since Issue #13 (November 2013).

With Hasbro's November 2019 announcement of My Little Pony: Pony Life television series, which features ponies in a revamped, caricatured appearance, relevant toys were released in the same month.

Playful Ponies
The first line of the toys were the Playful Ponies. These feature a pony with brushable hair, a saddle or wagon, an animal companion and a comb. The first six ponies released were Twilight Sparkle, Rainbow Dash, Fluttershy, Pinkie Pie, Applejack and Rarity. There are also promotional packs: two-packs, released in Europe. Event Singles were also released in a particular month, including a Valentine's Day Pinkie Pie, released in February 2011, and an Easter Fluttershy, released in April 2011.
Hasbro later announced that the second wave of toys would be released in March 2011. Due to the 2011 Tōhoku earthquake and tsunami, however, the release was postponed and the toys were released the following month. The second wave omits Rainbow Dash and Fluttershy and includes two new ponies: Cheerilee and Lily Blossom. The third wave was released in May 2011, introducing four new ponies: Cupcake, Lulu Luck, Dewdrop Dazzle and Blossomforth. Wave four was released in July 2011, introducing six new ponies: Feathermay, Flitterheart, Snowcatcher, Twinkleshine, Honeybuzz and Plumsweet.
The fifth wave was released in early 2012, with two new debuting characters: Cherry Pie and Diamond Rose. Later on in May 2012, Lyra Heartstrings, Trixie Lulamoon, Cherry Berry and Sunny Rays, characters who first appeared in the Friendship Is Magic television series, also debuted as playful ponies.

Collector series
In the 2012 New York Toy Fair, Hasbro announced plans to release several exclusive toys for collectors. The characters represented were actually requested by fans of the animated series and were released in September 2012. The characters in this line include an animation accurate Princess Celestia, Nightmare Moon, DJ Pon-3, Lemony Gem, Flower Wishes/Daisy and Zecora.

Story packs
Story packs (the playsets in the toyline) include at least one pony, one large playset piece and numerous accessories, and were released like the Playful Ponies, as in previous incarnations. Story-pack exclusives include Sweetie Belle, Apple Bloom, Scootaloo, Sweetie Swirl, Star Swirl (Europe only), Princess Cadance and Shining Armor.

Ride-Along Ponies
The Ride-Along Ponies are special versions of the Playful Ponies, each with a scooter and an animal companion. Three sets were released in July 2011 with Wave Four of the Playful Ponies.

So-Soft Newborn
These versions are identical in design to their "G3" counterparts, except they are plush-bodied and are designed to be resemble infants. There are seven characters are in this line: Sunny Daze, Sweetie Belle, Rainbow Dash, Pinkie Pie, Apple Sprout, Princess Skyla and Spike. Each of them includes a pacifier or a bottle.

Shine Bright Ponies
The Shine Bright Ponies have a light-up section when their saddle is pressed. They are slightly bigger than the Playful Ponies, and their legs are posable. The ponies Rarity, Pinkie Pie, and Rainbow Dash were released at first. In the United States, Fluttershy, Twilight Sparkle (along with Starbeam Twinkle) and Princess Luna (along with Pinkie Pie) were later released as Target exclusives.

Fashion Style Ponies
Fashion Style Ponies are larger versions of the Playful Ponies, each with a unique dress and accessories; two were released each wave.

Glimmer Wing Ponies
The Glimmer Wing Ponies have butterfly-like wings on their backs which can be moved. The ponies are: Rainbow Dash, Rarity and Ploomette. In 2012, Daisy Dreams and Fluttershy were released. Later sets included Glimmer Wings Sweet Song and Fluttershy and Glimmer Wings Diamond Rose and Pinkie Pie. "Sonic Rainboom", the sixteenth episode of Friendship Is Magic season 1, acts as a tie-in.

Jumbo plush
In the United States, several jumbo-plush pony characters were released as Toys "R" Us exclusives, while a Special Storyteller Twilight Sparkle Plush was released as a Target exclusive.

Ponyville singles
The Ponyville singles are small, molded plastic toys. The main method of distribution is in individual, opaque bags so that the toy inside cannot be seen. In the United States, these toys have also been released in collector sets.

Canterlot
Released in 2011, it is a line centering on Canterlot, the capital city of Equestria, where Princesses Celestia and Luna live. In the United States, it was released exclusively on Target stores, as Hasbro had an agreement in July 2011.

Pony Royal Wedding and the Crystal Empire
In 2012, Hasbro revealed several new toys in the 2012 New York Toy Fair, themed around a royal wedding between characters Princess Cadance and Shining Armor. Alongside the release of them, several new characters were confirmed to be released as Playful Ponies as well as characters that were requested by the fans to be released in toy form. The promotion included the same themed area in stores with dedicated stands and signage, and a two-part finale of season 2 of Friendship is Magic, titled "A Canterlot Wedding".

Potion Ponies
Released in November 2019 in the United States, the toys in this line share the caricatured appearance with the ponies in the Pony Life animated series. A person styles the pony’s mane and tail by pouring a "potion" (or spraying it, depending on the product) over the pony.

== Media ==
=== Animated productions ===
My Little Pony: Friendship Is Magic is an animated television series produced by DHX Media's 2D animation studio (formerly known as Studio B Productions) in Vancouver, Canada, for Hasbro Studios (now Allspark) in the United States. The series premiered on Sunday, October 10, 2010 on The Hub (now Discovery Family), an American television channel partly owned by Hasbro. Friendship Is Magic was developed by Lauren Faust, who was a fan of the original property in her youth, and invented her own adventure stories for the toys in place of the stereotypical "girly" stories from the 1980s' features. The series became the most successful show on The Hub, popularized the brand, and gained a notable fan following.

An animated feature film based on the Friendship Is Magic characters was first announced on October 20, 2014, in an interview with Hasbro Studios CEO Stephen Davis by Variety. Released on October 6, 2017, in the United States, the new My Little Pony: The Movie is Hasbro's first animated feature film from its Allspark Pictures film division. It was distributed worldwide by Lionsgate, with the exception of China. Thiessen directed the film with McCarthy writing the film and act as the film's co-executive producer alongside Mike Vogel. Originally, Joe Ballarini was the scriptwriter for the film.

The film concerns the "Mane Six" ponies – Twilight Sparkle, Applejack, Fluttershy, Pinkie Pie, Rainbow Dash, and Rarity – journeying beyond Equestria to stop a threat looming over their hometown of Ponyville.

The main cast from Friendship Is Magic reprised their roles alongside original characters voiced by Kristin Chenoweth, Emily Blunt, Michael Peña, Uzo Aduba, Liev Schreiber, Taye Diggs, Sia, and Zoe Saldaña.

Two television specials were produced during the period. My Little Pony: Best Gift Ever, a holiday season special animated at DHX Media's Vancouver 2D animation studio, was first broadcast in the United States on October 27, 2018 on Discovery Family. Another special, My Little Pony: Rainbow Roadtrip, was animated at Boulder Media (an Irish studio which Hasbro acquired in 2016) and broadcast on June 29, 2019 on Discovery Family.

My Little Pony: Pony Life, another animated television series commissioned by Allspark Animation, premiered in the United States on November 7, 2020 on Discovery Family. The series, which succeeds Friendship Is Magic, features ponies in a caricatured appearance. The cast of six main characters in Friendship Is Magic have reprised their roles in the new series. Hasbro also plans to release additional animated shorts on My Little Pony's official YouTube channel.

My Little Pony animated productions

Title	Directors	Writers	Producers	Executive producers	Composer	Studio	Released
My Little Pony: Friendship Is Magic	Various			Stephen Davis, Kirsten Newlands, Sarah Wall and others	Daniel Ingram (songs); William Anderson (score)	DHX Media; Allspark Animation	October 10, 2010–October 12, 2019
My Little Pony: The Movie	Jayson Thiessen	Screenplay: Meghan McCarthy, Rita Hsiao and Michael Vogel; Story: Meghan McCarthy and Joe Ballarini	Stephen Davis, Haven Alexander, Brian Goldner and Marcia Gwendolyn Jones	Josh Feldman, Meghan McCarthy, Kirsten Newlands and Sarah Wall	Daniel Ingram	DHX Media; Allspark Pictures; Lionsgate (distribution)	October 6, 2017
My Little Pony: Best Gift Ever	Denny Lu and Mike Myhre	Michael Vogel	Devon Cody	Stephen Davis, Kirsten Newlands, Sarah Wall and Nicole Dubuc	Daniel Ingram (songs); William Anderson (score)	DHX Media; Allspark Animation	October 27, 2018
My Little Pony: Rainbow Roadtrip	Gillian Comerford	Kim Beyer-Johnson	Peter Lewis and Therese Trujillo	Stephen Davis, Nicole Dubuc and Meghan McCarthy	Daniel Ingram (songs); William Anderson (score)	Boulder Media; Allspark Animation	June 29, 2019

=== Interactive software ===
In conjunction with Ruckus Media, Hasbro released an iOS application Twilight Sparkle, Teacher for a Day in October 2011. It gives children practice in reading, incorporating mini-games. Several eBooks based on Friendship Is Magic, including story versions of the Ruckus applications, have been released for the Barnes & Noble Nook, in partnership with Hasbro.

Hasbro has licensed Gameloft to create Friendship Is Magic video games for mobile devices, with the first game, My Little Pony: Friendship Is Magic, reaching the market on November 8, 2012. The first game is a village-building game, featuring action-based mini-games for iOS and Android devices. Though the game is aimed at younger players, Gameloft's Barnabé Anglade stated that there are nods to the show's brony fandom, such as the inclusion of fan-favorite characters and popular background ponies.

=== Publications ===
==== Comics ====
The American My Little Pony comics are published by IDW Publishing under license from Hasbro. The first issue of the flagship title, Friendship Is Magic, was published in November 2012, and has proven a highly successful venture with a larger circulation than most competing titles. The series is written by Katie Cook and illustrated by Andy Price. The first issue, by early October, had already gained over 90,000 pre-orders, making it a better seller than other comics for that month. By early November, the title had exceeded 100,000 pre-orders, and IDW committed to a second run of the issue to meet the additional demand. The first issue features 19 different covers, most exclusive to specific comic book shops and chains and only available in limited numbers. The comic, through its first eight issues, remains IDW's most successful title, and along with The Walking Dead, remain one of the few non-DC, non-Marvel comics to regularly break the top 100 comics sold each month.

A series of Japanese comics by Akira Himekawa began appearing in Shogakukan's Pucchigumi magazine in Japan on August 12, 2013. It was tied in with the Japanese launch of the 2010 incarnation in early 2013 by the license holders at the time, We've Inc. and Bushiroad (All of relevant regional licenses were later taken over by Sega Toys). The first Akira Himekawa series completed its run in February 2014. The second, 80-page trade paperback was released on October 16, 2014.

Seven Seas Entertainment is releasing a series of comics with manga aesthetics titled My Little Pony: The Manga – A Day in the Life of Equestria (not to be confused with 2013 Japanese comics), with the first book having been released in June 2019.

Various "stock comics" also appeared in multiple languages for certain mainstream children's magazines, such as UK-based Redan Publishing's Sparkle World.

==== Literature ====
Hasbro has partnered with Little, Brown and Company to publish several children's books aimed at different reading levels involving the Friendship Is Magic franchise, including an official series guidebook, starting in April 2013. As of January 2016, more than 3 million My Little Pony books published by the company have been sold, and they have extended their Hasbro deal through to 2018, as well as adding other Hasbro properties such as Transformers.

== Other merchandises ==
=== Soundtracks ===
A twelve-track soundtrack, Friendship Is Magic: Songs of Friendship and Magic (Music from the Original TV Series), was released on iTunes on December 6, 2013, featuring select songs from the first and second seasons of the show.

An eleven-track soundtrack, Friendship Is Magic: Songs of Ponyville (Music from the Original TV Series), was released on iTunes on April 21, 2014, featuring select songs from the third and fourth seasons of the show.

A ten-track soundtrack, Friendship Is Magic: Songs of Harmony, was released on iTunes on April 13, 2015, featuring select songs from the show's fourth season, plus the season two song "The Perfect Stallion" (from "Hearts and Hooves Day"), full versions of both "Find the Music in You" (from "Filli Vanilli") and "Let the Rainbow Remind You" (from "Twilight's Kingdom – Part 2"), as well as a mash-up between "Winter Wrap Up" and "A True, True Friend".

Another ten-track soundtrack, Friendship Is Magic: Pinkie's Party Playlist, was released on iTunes on July 7, 2016, featuring select songs from the show's fourth and fifth seasons, as well as a re-recorded version of the "Pony Pokey" song from season one.

==== Remix album ====
Based on the popularity of adult My Little Pony fandom's remixing of songs from the show, Hasbro and Lakeshore Records developed an EDM remix album entitled DJ Pon-3 Presents My Little Pony Friendship Is Magic Remixed. Originally set for release in late 2014 but ultimately released digitally on June 2, 2015, the album and in retail June 23, 2015, contains 13 tracks that remix the original show compositions from Ingram with various artists. The album was produced by Justin Lassen who wanted to keep an all-ages enjoyment and avoid excessive repetition of dubstep-based remixes.

==== Christmas album ====
A Christmas-themed album, titled It's a Pony Kind of Christmas, was released for on-demand streaming and digital release on November 6, 2015. Featuring performances by the cast of My Little Pony: Friendship Is Magic as well as the Phoenix Chamber Choir from Vancouver, the album contains original holiday-themed songs as well as covers of traditional Christmas songs and an extended version of "The Heart Carol" (from the episode "Hearth's Warming Eve"). Within 24 hours after its release, the album peaked at #1 on both iTunes and Amazon.

An expanded version, titled Friendship Is Magic – It's a Pony Kind of Christmas, was released on iTunes on October 7, 2016. The expanded version includes the songs from the season six episode "A Hearth's Warming Tail" (Hearth's Warming Eve is Here Once Again, Say Goodbye to the Holiday, The Seeds of the Past, Pinkie's Present, and Luna's Future).

=== Card games ===
Enterplay, LLC has been licensed to create trading cards of Friendship Is Magic, with a first set released in early 2012 and a second set published in 2013. In addition to the base cards, Enterplay has offered limited edition cards at various fan conventions, which have since become of card collector's value. A Friendship Is Magic-themed collectible card game by Enterplay, My Little Pony Collectible Card Game, was released in November 2013. The card game has been considered successful by Enterplay, helping them to boost their sales within the hobby game sector, and have led to several expansions to the card series.

=== Others ===
In April 2013, Hasbro and Build-A-Bear Workshop began offering Friendship Is Magic-based plush toys for customization. Sales of My Little Pony toys were three times as large in 2013 than in 2003, and have helped Hasbro to promote other lines of toys aimed at girls. Hasbro stated that merchandising tied to Friendship Is Magic lead to franchise sales over $650 million in 2014, and others have considered the show's popularity to make 2015 the "year of the unicorn" for toy and related manufacturers.

On April 16, 2013, World Trade Jewelers signed a deal with Hasbro to make Friendship Is Magic jewelry. The collection was released for consumer release in October 2013.

River Horse in the United Kingdom developed and released a series of board games titled My Little Pony: Tails of Equestria. In the United States, it is distributed by Shinobi7.

Seven Seas Entertainment released a manga series (titled My Little Pony: The Manga – A Day in the Life of Equestria) in June 2019 and a papercraft book (titled My Little Pony: Friendship is Magic Papercraft – The Mane 6 & Friends) in October 2020.

A video game based on the fifth iteration of the franchise, titled My Little Pony: A Maretime Bay Adventure, was released in May 27, 2022 on the Nintendo Switch.

== Fandom ==
Despite Hasbro's target demographic of young girls and their parents, this incarnation of the franchise has become a cultural and Internet phenomenon with the new fandom generated by Friendship Is Magic television series, having many male fans between 13 and 35. The response from the Internet has been traced to cartoon and animation fans on the Internet board 4chan, responding to Amidi's negative essay regarding the show and current trends in animation. As a result of the discussion on 4chan, interest in the show spread throughout other parts of the Internet, creating a large fanbase and a multitude of creative works, fan sites, and conventions. The fanbase has adopted the name "brony" (a portmanteau of "bro" and "pony") to describe themselves. The older fanbase had come as a surprise to Hasbro and staff members involved with the show. They have appreciated and embraced the fandom, adding nods to the fans within the show and the toys.

== See also ==
- My Little Pony: Equestria Girls, an extension in anthropomorphic toys, as well as a spin-off media franchise, launched in 2013.
