= Mark Acheson =

Canadian voice actor

- Born: September 19, 1957 (age 68); Edmonton, Alberta, Canada
- Occupation: Actor
- Years active: 1972–present

Mark Acheson (born September 19, 1957) is a Canadian film, television and voice actor.

== Career ==
Acheson began studying acting at Langara College’s Studio 58 at the age of 15. He is a founding member of Janus Theatre and appeared on stage for eight years including a full season at the Arts Club as well as The NewPlay center, Carousel Theatre, Western Canada Theatre in Kamloops, Sunshine Theatre in Kelowna, The Belfry in Victoria and StageWest in Edmonton. In his 30s, he started an extensive career in film and television, mostly in supporting roles. Some of his most notable roles are the Mailroom Guy in Elf and R. Tripoli in Fargo. His other film credits include The 13th Warrior and Watchmen.

Acheson has also amassed a large body of work in voice acting, where he tends to be cast as villains. He voiced Lord Tirek in My Little Pony: Friendship Is Magic, Sabretooth in Hulk Vs. Wolverine, and various characters in various Transformers media.

== Filmography ==
=== Film ===
Year	Title	Role	Notes
1977	Skip Tracer	Bob Sheldon	
1987	Home Is Where the Hart Is	Cafe Customer	
1989	Quarantine	Guard	
1993	Look Who's Talking Now!	Burly Dad	
1993	The Crush	Locksmith	
1993	Samurai Cowboy	Flint Clayton	
1994	Bulletproof Heart	Hellbig	
1994	The NeverEnding Story III	Janitor	
1995	Magic in the Water	'Lefty' Hardy	
1997	Exception to the Rule	Burt Ramsey	
1998	I'll Be Home for Christmas	Sandwich Passenger	
1999	True Heart	Red Head Man	
1999	The 13th Warrior	Norseman	
2000	Reindeer Games	Mean Guard	
2000	Screwed	Mr. Kettle	
2000	Trixie	Vince DeFlore	
2001	The Proposal	Jules	
2001	3000 Miles to Graceland	Dockmaster	
2001	Lola	Club Owner	
2002	Dead Heat	Warehouse Worker	
2003	Spymate	Rocco	
2003	Elf	Mailroom Guy	
2004	The Chronicles of Riddick	Slam Guard	
2005	Alone in the Dark	Captain Chernick	
2006	She's the Man	Groundskeeper	
2006	Love and Other Dilemmas	Rocco	
2007	Numb	Homeless Guy	
2007	Hot Rod	Homeless Dude	
2008	Barbie & the Diamond Castle	Slyder (voice)	Direct-to-video
2009	Watchmen	Man at Happy Harry's	
2009	Hulk Vs.	Sabretooth (voice)	Direct-to-video
2013	Lawrence & Holloman	Burly Prisoner	
2015	Into the Grizzly Maze	Dooly	
2016	The Cleanse	Zatik	
2016	Marrying the Family	Hal	
2017	1922	Pawn Shop Clerk	
2023	Peter Pan & Wendy	Old Clemson	
2025	Silent Night, Deadly Night	Charlie	

=== Television ===
Year	Title	Role	Notes
1989	The Trial of the Incredible Hulk	Turk Barrett	Television film
1993–1994	Highlander: The Series	Laszlo, Billy Ray	2 episodes
1994	Suspicious Agenda	DeBaker	Television film
1997	Dad's Week Off	Sobbing Man	Television film
1998	Fat Dog Mendoza	Fat Dog (voice)	Main cast
1998	Stargate SG-1	Vishnoor	Episode: "Prisoners"
1999–2000	Weird-Ohs	Leaky Boat Louie (voice)	
2001	Donner	Blitzen, Cupid, Santa Claus (voice)	Television film
2001	Voyage of the Unicorn	Kalgar	Television film
2001–2002	Alienators: Evolution Continues	SCOPES (voice)	17 episodes
2002	The Amazing Zorro	Don Carlos Pulido (voice)	Television film
2002–2003	Stargate Infinity	Da'Kyll (voice)	26 episodes
2003	Transformers: Armada	Unicron (voice)	3 episodes; English dub
2003–2004	He-Man and the Masters of the Universe	Fisto, Chadaz (voice)	4 episodes
2004	Transformers: Energon	Unicron (voice)	English dub
2004	Smallville	Magistrate Wilkins	2 episodes
2005–2006	Transformers: Cybertron	Crumplezone (voice)	10 episodes
2006	.hack//Roots	Tawalaya, Touta (voice)	English dub
2006	Black Lagoon	Boris (voice)	English dub
2007	Class of the Titans	Orion (voice)	Episode: "Star Quality"
2007	Fantastic Four: World's Greatest Heroes	Attuma (voice)	Episode: "Atlantis Attacks"
2009–2011	Hot Wheels Battle Force 5	Rawkus (voice)	5 episodes
2009, 2015	Supernatural	Hansel, Tooth Fairy	2 episodes
2012	The Little Prince	Lux (voice)	Episode: "La planète des Cublix"; English dub
2013	Dinosaur Train	Marvin Mosasaurus (voice)	Episode: "Maisie Mosasaurus"
2013	Garage Sale Mystery	Pawn Clerk	1 episode
2013	Once Upon a Time in Wonderland	Nazim	Episode: "Forget Me Not"
2014–2019	My Little Pony: Friendship Is Magic	Lord Tirek (voice)	10 episodes
2018	Tobot	Tobot Giga Seven (voice)	English dub
2018	Super Dinosaur	Hammerhead Leader (voice)	

=== Video games ===
Year	Title	Role	Notes
2000	Kessen	Shimazu Yoshihiro	English dub
2005	Marvel Nemesis: Rise of the Imperfects	Brigade	
