= Princess Luna =

Fictional character from My Little Pony

- My Little Pony character
- Princess Luna as she appears in "Bloom and Gloom"
- First appearance: "Friendship Is Magic – Part 1" (2010)
- Created by: Lauren Faust; Mary Jane Begin
- Voiced by: Tabitha St. Germain (speaking voice); Kazumi Evans (singing voice, 2014); Aloma Steele (singing voice, 2016-2019)

In-universe information
- Alias: Nightmare Moon (formerly)
- Species: Alicorn
- Titles: Ruler of Equestria; Princess of the Moon; Princess of the Night
- Affiliation: Equestrian Royal Family
- Family: Princess Celestia (older sister)

Princess Luna (formerly known as Nightmare Moon) is a fictional character who appears in the fourth incarnation of Hasbro's My Little Pony toyline and media franchise, beginning with My Little Pony: Friendship Is Magic (2010–2019). She serves as the co-ruler of Equestria alongside her older sister Princess Celestia. She is voiced by Tabitha St. Germain, who also voices Rarity.

A wise but initially troubled anthropomorphic alicorn, Princess Luna is responsible for raising the moon and has the ability to enter and manipulate the dream realm.

== Appearances ==
=== Fourth My Little Pony incarnation (2010–2021) ===
==== My Little Pony: Friendship Is Magic ====
A thousand years ago, Princess Luna once ruled peacefully alongside her older sister Princess Celestia. However, she became jealous because ponies were sleeping through the night, and her big sister was more well-known and well-loved than she ever was. This led to her transforming into Nightmare Moon, forcing Celestia to banish her to the moon using the Elements of Harmony.

Nightmare Moon first appears in the series premiere, where she has returned from her thousand-year banishment and seeks to plunge Equestria into eternal night. After being defeated by Twilight Sparkle and her friends using the Elements of Harmony, she is restored to her original form as Luna and tearfully reunites with Celestia.

Throughout the early seasons, Luna struggles to adapt to modern Equestrian society after her long absence. She initially speaks in an archaic and formal manner using the royal we. In "Luna Eclipsed", she attempts to socialize with ponies during Nightmare Night (Equestria's equivalent of Halloween), inadvertently frightening other ponies due to her use of the "Canterlot Royal Voice". By the end of the episode, she learns to overcome ponies' fear of her Nightmare Moon persona. Luna often enters ponies' nightmares to help them overcome their fears. In the series finale, she retires from her royal duties along with Celestia and passes her responsibilities to Twilight.

==== My Little Pony: The Movie ====
Princess Luna appears at the beginning of the film alongside Celestia and Cadance, preparing for the Friendship Festival in Canterlot. When the Storm King's forces, led by Tempest Shadow, attack Canterlot, Luna attempts to defend the city but is turned to stone by Tempest’s obsidian orbs. She remains petrified for most of the film until the Storm King's defeat releases all the captured magic, restoring her and the other princesses to normal.

==== My Little Pony: Pony Life ====
Nightmare Moon appears in a stained glass window in the second season episode "Magical Mare-story Tour."

=== Friendship Is Magic comic series ===
Luna's earliest depictions shows how she used to be when she was younger as she was the 'funny one' and the one that 'could make people socialize the best' compared to Celestia.

In Legends of Magic Annual 2018, during an alternate dimension visited by Stygian and the Pillars of Equestria using Starswirl's mirror portal, a version of the Pony of Shadows kidnaps a young Princess Luna and Princess Celestia. The alternate Pony of Shadows intended to corrupt the young sisters and turn them into Nightmare Moon and Daybreaker. The Pillars of Equestria successfully rescued them; however, Luna's heart is tainted with Nightmare Force, foreshadowing future events.

In My Little Pony: Nightmare Knights, an assembled team of reformed villains, led by Princess Luna, retrieve stolen magic from the chaotic Princess Eris through one of Starswirl's many mirror portals. She encounters Daybreaker, an alternate universe Celestia corrupted by the Pony of Shadows and who killed the Nightmare Moon of that world. Featuring characters like Stygian, Capper, Tempest Shadow, and the "Great & Powerful" Trixie Lulamoon, who each adopt villainous-themed aliases for their mission.

== Equestria Girls alternate version ==
Luna's human world counterpart, Vice Principal Luna appears as the firm, but fair vice principal of Canterlot High School, with her older sister Principal Celestia as the school's principal.

== Development ==
Author Mary Jane Begin wrote that "Princess Luna's coloration is an essential part of her overall design, reflecting her role as the pony who rules the night." She also wrote that "Nightmare Moon's overall body shape, wing design, and coloration reflect her more sinister demeanor."

== Reception and analysis ==
Several episodes of Friendship Is Magic depict Luna's "difficulty living in her older sister's shadow", such as adapting to modern Equestrian customs and repairing her public image.

History professor Andrew Crome wrote that Christian fans had drawn fan artwork which depicted Jesus supporting a weeping Princess Luna with a juxtaposition of Luna's redemption from her evil Nightmare Moon persona and Bible verses communicating Christ's forgiveness.

Researchers Christian Valiente and Xeno Rasmusson wrote in their 2015 article Bucking the Stereotypes that Princess Luna demonstrated the show's challenges to traditional gender roles and depictions of female authority figures as one of "two regal sisters who ruled together and created harmony for all the land." The researchers observed that even as the antagonist Nightmare Moon, Luna represented a powerful female villain, and that "return from her imprisonment serves as the driving force of the story arc." They concluded that Luna's dual role illustrated how female characters play the roles of the heroes as well as the villains in what they described as the show's "truly female-oriented society."

Author Priscilla Hobbs compared the sun-moon dichotomy between Princess Celestia and Luna to ancient concepts of duality like the yin and yang. Hobbs connected Luna's transformation into Nightmare Moon to Greek mythology: Luna is "possessed by the nature of discord" despite having previously defeated Discord with her sister, drawing a parallel to Hesiod's description of Eris as a force of strife.

Media scholar Kevin Fletcher analyzed the backstory of Princess Celestia and Luna's defeat of Discord as "a feminist impulse," describing their actions as a form of revolution where "the sisters fight against injustice and liberate the oppressed." Fletcher remarked that this backstory established Equestria as a matriarchal diarchy ruled by both princesses, which contrasted with Discord's previous autocratic kingship. Fletcher also examined Luna's role within the show's cosmic symbolism, observing that she and Celestia are part of a pattern where "three of the alicorns are linked to traditional images of planetary gods." He commented that Luna's responsibility for the moon represents her connection to natural forces, which he compared to Discord's disruption of these same cycles during his return to power.

Researcher Sarah Evans examined discussions about Princess Luna's characterization within online writing groups. The study documented a case where fanfiction authors sought advice on writing Luna; community members provided various suggestions for her portrayal, including depicting her as out of touch with modern culture and technology, and debated the appropriate speech patterns for her character, with some clarifying that she spoke in Early Modern English rather than Old English. The researchers used this discussion as an example of how the My Little Pony fan fiction community engages in so-called "distributed mentoring".

Carly Olsen, writing in Screen Rant, ranked Princess Luna as the third most powerful magic user in Friendship Is Magic, with her sister Princess Celestia ranked second and her protégée Twilight Sparkle ranked first.

A 2019 survey of the brony fandom found that Luna was overwhelmingly the most popular of the non-Mane Six characters; the surveyors surmised that this could be driven by bronies identifying with Luna's character.

== In popular culture ==
Luna appears alongside Princess Celestia in the popular YouTube series "Two Best Sisters Play", where they are portrayed as video game players.

Luna is a popular character in merchandise and collectibles, with items like the Kotobukiya Bishoujo statue series featuring humanized versions of her character. In 2013, online store WeLoveFine sold plush shoulder bags featuring Princess Luna. In 2019, Princess Luna appeared as one of three characters featured in a limited-edition Magic: The Gathering crossover set called Ponies: The Galloping, released as part of a charity collaboration between Hasbro and Wizards of the Coast to benefit Extra Life and Seattle Children's Hospital. The silver-bordered trading card depicted both her Princess Luna and Nightmare Moon forms with artwork that blended the styles of Magic and My Little Pony.

== See also ==
- List of My Little Pony: Friendship Is Magic characters
- Princess Celestia
- Brony fandom
