= Discord (My Little Pony) =

Fictional character from My Little Pony

- My Little Pony character
- Discord as he appears in "What About Discord?"
- First appearance: "The Return of Harmony" (2011)
- Last appearance: "The Last Problem"; October 12, 2019
- Created by: Lauren Faust; M.A. Larson
- Voiced by: John de Lancie; Peter New (Pony Life)

In-universe information
- Species: Draconequus
- Title(s): Disharmony, Lord of Chaos, Spirit of Chaos and The Serpent (Comic only for the title "The Serpent")
- Affiliation: Mane Six (ally); Fluttershy (best friend)
- Significant others: Cosmos (ex-girlfriend; comics only)

Discord is a fictional character who appears in the fourth incarnation of Hasbro's My Little Pony toyline and media franchise, beginning with My Little Pony: Friendship Is Magic (2010–2019). He first appears as the main antagonist of the second season premiere before becoming a recurring character throughout the rest of the series. He is voiced by John de Lancie.

A powerful and mischievous anthropomorphic draconequus who embodies chaos and disharmony, Discord possesses the ability to warp reality and revels in creating disorder and confusion. Introduced in the second season premiere as a malevolent being who once ruled Equestria through chaos more than a thousand years ago before being defeated and turned to stone by Princess Celestia and Princess Luna, he is later reformed via Fluttershy's kindness and friendship, and becomes one of her closest friends and an unlikely ally to the Mane Six.

== Appearances ==
=== Fourth My Little Pony incarnation (2010–2021) ===
==== My Little Pony: Friendship Is Magic ====
More than a thousand years before the beginning of the series, Discord once ruled Equestria in a state of unrest and unhappiness until Princess Celestia and Princess Luna used the Elements of Harmony to turn him into stone. Discord first appears in the second season premiere "The Return of Harmony" when he escapes from his stone prison and plunges Equestria into chaos. He corrupts the Mane Six and causes them to turn against each other. After Twilight Sparkle overcomes his influence and restores the Elements of Harmony, Discord is defeated and turned back into stone.

Discord returns in the episode "Keep Calm and Flutter On" when Princess Celestia releases him from his stone prison and tasks Fluttershy with reforming him. Throughout subsequent seasons, Discord develops a close friendship with Fluttershy while learning to use his chaotic abilities for good rather than evil, and occasionally helps the Mane Six in their adventures.

== Development ==
Lauren Faust's sketches of Discord in 2011, where she tried considering different concepts of the character. Her husband, Craig McCracken, provided commentary and ideas for the character.

He's the one character where we can break all of the rules of the show. He can have a reference to something that's a bit more modern day or contemporary. He has hands—which is a big thing. In Seasons 4 and 5, I ended up with a couple of Discord episodes, and he then became a kind of character where you could just throw him in a different costume and have him do something extra silly—it seems to work really well for him.

— Jim Miller, My Little Pony: The Art of Equestria

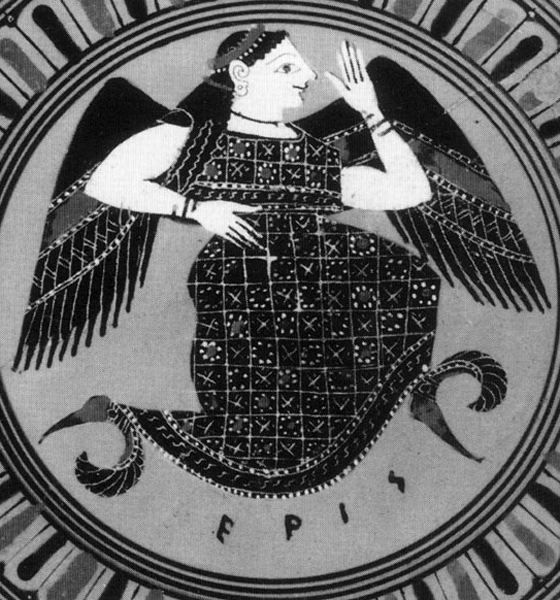
Eris, the winged goddess of chaos.

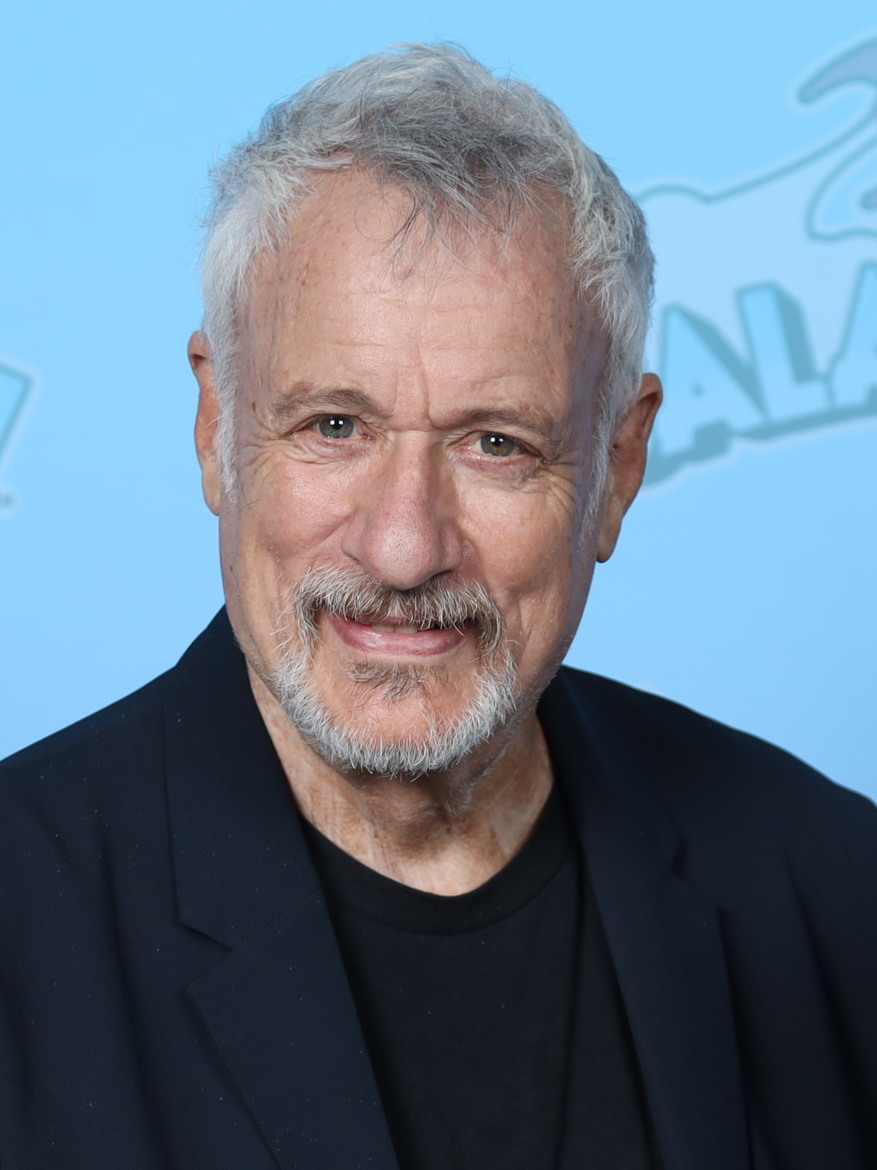
John de Lancie provided the voice for Discord.

In mythology, Discord or Discordia is a trickster and the Roman goddess of chaos. Show creator Lauren Faust based Discord's character on Q, an omnipotent trickster played by John de Lancie in Star Trek: The Next Generation. The production team considered casting a soundalike of de Lancie to voice the character but decided to try to get de Lancie himself, who was available. The creative team developed Discord as "the one character who could break all of the rules of the show", by making him put more modernized or contemporary pop culture references than usual in the series' "fantasy storybook" setting. He was not intended to have a recurring role; according to McCarthy, "'reforming' him allows us to tell new stories with his character. He gets to be the not-always-reliable ally instead of the known enemy". Author of My Little Pony: The Art of Equestria Mary Jane Begin commented on the "chaotic" settings that accompany the character, such as his home dimension called Chaosville, likening them to "dream-inspired Salvador Dalí paintings".

Discord's introduction in the Season 2 premiere was indicative of the show's incorporation of pop culture references to appeal to adult viewers. Media studies professor Venetia Laura Delano Robertson noted that Discord's chaos-inducing abilities referenced the viral YouTube video and Internet meme "Chocolate Rain" by Tay Zonday that had been popularized on 4chan. Robertson described Discord's debut as the show's deliberately "tailoring to the geek demographic"; the series also used references ranging from Star Wars: A New Hope (which the ponies' victory ceremony directly mimicked) to The Big Lebowski (whose characters appeared as background ponies).

Supervising director and executive producer Jayson Thiessen wrote of Discord's reformation:

"What I like is that he started out as a villain and now he's not a villain, but he never really changed. It's really just whether or not he's trying to hurt the ponies or take over their world. He's still the chaos character that we were introduced to; it's just that now he's not doing it for evil purposes. He's essentially the genie from Aladdin in a way, or Loki—really, any sort of trickster. He can be either negative or positive, but it doesn't change his trickster nature."

== Reception and analysis ==
According to author Priscilla Hobbs, when Faust drew inspiration from Greek mythological creatures like chimeras and manticores when developing Discord, she deliberately made his body parts asymmetrical and from different animals to give the impression of disharmony. Hobbs likened Discord's character to the Greek goddess Eris, the personification of discord and strife, and applied essayist Lewis Hyde's analysis of trickster figures to Discord, describing him as "a boundary-crosser" who "will cross the line and confuse the distinction" between established social and moral categories. Hobbs also wrote that the show presents a doctrine of balance similar to Aristotle's Golden Mean, where Discord and harmony must coexist rather than one annihilating the other (cf. The Nicomachean Ethics). Hobbs wrote that Discord's transformation from chaotic villain to reformed ally represents hope and optimism for controlling real-world chaos, especially for "a generation who has spent a significant portion of its life in a state of war and chaos."

Samuel Miller used Discord as the namesake for a theoretical framework he termed "discordant masculinity." Miller argued that Discord's physical composition as a draconequus and his character arc from chaotic antagonist to reformed ally through friendship parallels how adult male fans of the show challenge traditional gender norms. According to Miller, Discord's initial appearance as "chaotic, mish-mashed, and an oddity" followed by the revelation of "something within him that is genuine and good" mirrors how the general public perceives male My Little Pony fans (also known as bronies).

Kevin Fletcher wrote that Discord's backstory reflects "a feminist impulse" and that Princess Celestia and Luna's dethroning of Discord is a form of feminist revolution against autocracy, with the sisters liberating the oppressed ponies and establishing Equestria's matriarchal diarchy. Fletcher wrote that Discord's actions (taking control of the world while altering reality in ways reminiscent of M.C. Escher and Salvador Dalí) are a representation of "male culture" that contrasts with the femininity of the ponies.

Carly Olsen, writing in Screen Rant, ranked Discord as the fourth most powerful magic user in Friendship Is Magic.

== See also ==
- List of My Little Pony: Friendship Is Magic characters
- Fluttershy
- Princess Celestia
- Princess Luna
- Twilight Sparkle
- Derpy Hooves
- Zecora
- My Little Pony: Friendship Is Magic fandom

== Bibliography ==
- Begin, Mary Jane (2015). My Little Pony: The Art of Equestria. New York: Abrams. ISBN 978-1-4197-1577-8.
- Snider, Brandon T. (2013). The Elements of Harmony: My Little Pony: Friendship Is Magic: The Official Guidebook. New York: Little, Brown and Company. ISBN 978-0-316-24754-2.
