= Princess Celestia =

Fictional character from My Little Pony

- My Little Pony character
- Princess Celestia as she appears in "Princess Twilight Sparkle – Part 1"
- First appearance: "Friendship Is Magic – Part 1" (2010)
- Created by: Lauren Faust
- Based on: Majesty from the My Little Pony toyline's first incarnation
- Voiced by: Nicole Oliver

In-universe information
- Alias: Daybreaker (Alternate Universe)
- Species: Alicorn
- Titles: Ruler of Equestria; Princess of the Sun; Princess of the Day
- Occupation: Twilight Sparkle’s mentor (season 1-3); Sunset Shimmer's teacher (formerly)
- Affiliation: Equestrian Royal Family
- Family: Princess Luna (younger sister)
- Significant other: King Sombra (from alternate universe) (comics only)

Princess Celestia is a fictional character who appears in the fourth incarnation of Hasbro's My Little Pony toyline and media franchise, beginning with My Little Pony: Friendship Is Magic (2010–2019). She serves as the benevolent ruler of Equestria and mentor to Twilight Sparkle, the series' main protagonist. She is voiced by Nicole Oliver.

A wise, patient, and nurturing anthropomorphic alicorn, Celestia is responsible for raising the sun and has ruled Equestria for over a thousand years.

== Appearances ==
=== Fourth My Little Pony incarnation (2010–2021) ===
==== My Little Pony: Friendship Is Magic ====
A thousand years ago, Princess Celestia once ruled alongside her younger sister Princess Luna, who controlled the night and moon. However, Luna's jealousy and transformation into Nightmare Moon forced Celestia to banish her to the moon using the Elements of Harmony, leaving Celestia to manage both day and night alone. Celestia first appears in the series premiere when she assigns Twilight and her assistant and little brother Spike to travel from Canterlot to oversee the Summer Sun Celebration in Ponyville. When Nightmare Moon does return and plunges Equestria into eternal night, Celestia mysteriously disappears, having been captured by her corrupted sister. After Twilight and her friends defeat Nightmare Moon and restore Luna, Celestia returns and joyfully reunites with her sister and allows Twilight and Spike to remain in Ponyville with the new friends they have made in Ponyville to learn about friendship and to write letters about what she has learned. In the episode "Lesson Zero", Celestia tasks Twilight's friends to begin writing friendship letters to her as well.

The series portrays Celestia as a figure of reverence bordering on deity-like worship among Equestrian ponies. Ponies frequently use her name as an interjection and a euphemism (e.g. "Oh my Celestia!" and "Praise Celestia!" or "In the name of Celestia"). Ponies often bow in her presence, and she is treated with extraordinary deference and awe. Despite this, she is portrayed as having a sense of humor.

Throughout the series, Celestia serves as Twilight's mentor and teacher, sending her friendship assignments through magical letters and providing guidance when needed. She personally chose Twilight as her protégé after witnessing Twilight's magical potential as a filly. She presides over major events such as the Grand Galloping Gala and the Equestria Games, and occasionally visits Ponyville to check on Twilight's progress. During many two-part season premieres and finales, she tasks Twilight and her friends with various missions. In later seasons, Celestia gradually prepares Twilight to eventually succeed her as ruler of Equestria, culminating in Twilight's coronation. In the series finale, Celestia retires alongside Luna.

==== My Little Pony: Equestria Girls ====
In the Equestria Girls spin-off, Princess Celestia is shown to be the former mentor of Sunset Shimmer, her previous student before Twilight, who later turned cruel and dishonest and abandoned her studies before disappearing into the human world. In the first Equestria Girls film, she tasks Twilight with traveling to the human world to recover her crown containing the Element of Magic after it is stolen by Sunset. In the special My Little Pony: Equestria Girls – Forgotten Friendship, she reconciles with Sunset when she returns to Equestria to seek her guidance and apologizes to her.

==== My Little Pony: The Movie ====
Princess Celestia appears at the beginning of the film alongside Luna and Cadance, preparing for the Friendship Festival in Canterlot. When the Storm King's forces, led by Tempest Shadow, attack Canterlot, Celestia attempts to defend the city but is turned to stone by Tempest's obsidian orbs. She remains petrified for most of the film until the Storm King's defeat releases all the captured magic, restoring her and the other princesses to normal.

==== My Little Pony: Pony Life ====
Princess Celestia appears in the spin-off reboot series My Little Pony: Pony Life with a different personality, being portrayed as more light-hearted compared to her wise and composed characterization in Friendship Is Magic. She notably appears as a recurring character in the first six episodes of the first season as the judge of the Royal Jelly Juggernaut reality television series.

== Equestria Girls alternate version ==
Celestia's human world counterpart, Principal Celestia appears as the mellow-voiced, but wise principal of Canterlot High School, with her younger sister, Vice Principal Luna as the school’s vice-principal.

== Development ==
Faust's original sketch of Princess Celestia for the FiM pitch bible in 2008, where she was originally depicted as a queen named Queen Majesty with "no parents that outranked her".

Show creator Lauren Faust's original concept for Celestia was a queen rather than a princess, but she was changed into a princess because Hasbro thought that "girls assume that Queens are evil [...] and Princesses are good", and that "the perceived youth of a Princess is preferable to consumers".

The Royal Family are the highest-ranking ponies in the Equestrian nation. The novel Twilight Sparkle and the Crystal Heart Spell establishes that the Princesses with wings and a horn are "a special breed of pony able to harness the magical powers of the Unicorns, the flight abilities of the Pegasi, and the strength of a good, true heart of an Earth Pony". Faust states that Celestia "embodies the traits of all three [kinds of ponies]".

== Reception and analysis ==
Author Priscilla Hobbs compared the sun-moon dichotomy between Celestia and Luna to ancient concepts of duality like the yin and yang. In addition, Celestia's thousand-year period of controlling both celestial bodies, following Luna's banishment, has been analyzed as representing a disruption of natural cosmic order. Hobbs wrote that Celestia's later decision to reform Discord rather than simply re-imprison him suggests a philosophical understanding of balance, suggesting that opposing forces must coexist rather than be suppressed, and connected the themes to classical philosophical traditions regarding social and cosmic harmony.

Media scholar Kevin Fletcher wrote that Celestia's original conception as "Queen Majesty" was changed to "Princess Celestia" due to Hasbro's marketing concerns; executives believed that princess toys would be more marketable than queen toys. Despite this change, they observed that Celestia's characterization challenges traditional princess stereotypes by portraying her as mature, proactive, strong-willed, and confident, governing in a manner more like a queen than a passive princess figure. Furthermore, Celestia and Luna's backstory of overthrowing Discord was interpreted as representing resistance against autocracy. Fletcher also analyzed Celestia's status as an alicorn within the show's social hierarchy, noting her position among the upper-class elite that combines attributes of the show's three main pony types.

In their analysis of Equestria Girls in queer popular culture and its use of John Milton's epic poem Paradise Lost, Melissa Rohrer and Sara Austin wrote that Princess Celestia is God in the film's adaptation of Milton's work, as she serves as Sunset Shimmer's former mentor (represented by Satan) who banished her to Earth after Sunset's failed attempt to overthrow Celestia. Rohrer and Austin wrote that Celestia represents "a much more understanding and nurturing God than Milton's harsh and authoritarian creation," and remarked that she encourages Twilight (Christ) to inspire others as equals rather than demand "fealty or devotion", which the authors described as "a significant departure from Milton's God." According to Rohrer and Austin, this portrayal of Celestia, along with Sunset Shimmer's character development, allows the Satan figure to be redeemed and welcomed into friendship rather than eternally punished, which represents what José Esteban Muñoz calls a "queer utopia" reimagining of Paradise Lost.

Carly Olsen, writing in Screen Rant, ranked Princess Celestia as the second most powerful magic user in Friendship Is Magic, with her protégée Twilight Sparkle ranked first.

== In popular culture ==
In a 2018 study of the brony fandom, "praise Celestia" was listed as an example of commonly used brony lingo (known as bronyspeak) associated with the show's characters. Celestia appears alongside Princess Luna in the popular YouTube series "Two Best Sisters Play", where they are portrayed as video game players.

Princess Celestia was the basis for a controversial parody character known as "Princess Molestia", which appeared in a popular Tumblr roleplay blog called "Ask Princess Molestia" that operated from 2011 to 2014. Created by fandom artist John Joseco, Molestia was an alternate version of Celestia that depicted the character as a sexual predator. The blog was popular within the brony fandom, even earning its own TV Tropes page, but was also highly controversial due to its pornographic content. The blog was ultimately deleted in January 2014 reportedly due to copyright complaints made to Tumblr.

== See also ==
- Twilight Sparkle
- My Little Pony: Friendship Is Magic fandom
- List of My Little Pony: Friendship Is Magic characters
