= Stephen Saunders (entrepreneur) =

British businessman

- Born: February 1966 (age 60); United Kingdom
- Occupations: Businessperson, journalist, and marketing professional
- Known for: Former CEO of media and communications business Light Reading

Stephen Saunders is a British-born entrepreneur, journalist and marketing professional. He is the former CEO of Light Reading, a media, communications, and events business, which he founded in 2000, sold to UBM in 2005, and repurchased in 2014. Saunders sold Light Reading to Informa in 2016. Informa later acquired UBM in 2018.

Formerly, he was managing director of UBM DeusM, an integrated marketing services division of UBM, launched in 2010. He has also written and edited guidebooks on data communications and networks.

== Career ==
=== Start-ups ===
Saunders has been responsible for a number of online publishing start-ups, including:

- Light Reading (telecommunications news).
- Heavy Reading (telecommunications research).
- Dark Reading (security news).
- Internet Evolution (news on the development of the Internet).

Light Reading was bought by UBM for $33 million in 2005. Saunders initially remained as CEO, launching Internet Evolution later in 2005. In April 2013, it was announced that Saunders would return to an executive role with Light Reading.

In March 2008, Saunders was inducted into Min's Digital Media Hall of Fame. In October 2014, he was named as a "disruptor" in the Folio 100, Folio magazine's annual list of the "magazine and media industry’s innovators, entrepreneurial thinkers and disrupters." According to Folio, after reacquiring Light Reading, "Saunders immediately made a few significant changes, including doubling the full-time staff, establishing a blogger roster of more than 75 industry experts and launching the Big Telecom Event (BTE) with no traditional booths and exhibitors, allowing only hands-on demos."

=== UBM DeusM ===
DeusM was an integrated marketing services company which has launched 45 online communities. "...each of which is based on a specific theme such as Future Cities or Oncology...allow users to post their own content and are curated by a small team of editors and paid contributors.".

In 2013, UBM announced a decision to move its online business to the UBM DeusM community platform. EE Times made the transition in July, and has reported increased page views and messages. Light Reading followed in August, and Information Week was due to follow in October.

The DeusM webpage now redirects to UBM Tech.

=== Light Reading ===
Saunders founded Light Reading, a New York-based telecommunications industry information company, in 2000. It was purchased by UBM in 2005 for $33 million.

In February 2014, Stephen Saunders reacquired the company from UBM, with UBM retaining a "significant minority stake" in the company.

In July 2016, Informa acquired Light Reading from Saunders.

== Bibliography ==
- (Editor) The Data Communications Gigabit Ethernet Handbook (McGraw-Hill, 1998)
- The McGraw-Hill High-Speed LANs Handbook (McGraw-Hill, 1995)
