= UBM Technology Group =

American business-to-business media company

- Company type: Subsidiary
- Industry: Media
- Founded: 1971; 55 years ago (as CMP Publications Inc.)
- Founder: Gerard Leeds and Lilo Leeds
- Defunct: 2018
- Successor: Informa TechTarget
- Headquarters: San Francisco, California
- Products: Publishing; Advertising; Trade Shows
- Parent: Informa
- Website: tech.ubm.com

UBM Technology Group, formerly CMP Publications, was a business-to-business multimedia company that provided information and integrated marketing services to technology professionals worldwide. It offered marketers and advertisers services such as print, newsletters, custom web sites, and events. Its products and services include newspapers, magazines, Internet products, research, education and training, trade shows and conferences, direct marketing services and custom publishing.

Headquartered in San Francisco, California, UBM Technology Group was a part of UBM, a global business-to-business (B2B) events organiser which in turn owned by Informa and later absorbed into Informa TechTarget in 2024.

== History ==
In 1971, Gerard "Gerry" Leeds and his wife, Lilo, founded the company as CMP Publications Inc. in Manhasset, New York. Their sons Michael and Daniel managed the company in 1988, and launched TechWeb in 1994. CMP Media went public in 1997.

CMP Media acquired McGraw-Hill Information Technology and Communications Group (including BYTE) in 1998.

CMP Media was sold to United News & Media's Miller Freeman in 1999, Miller Freeman subsequently sold CMP UK and France to VNU. VNU Business Publications was later acquired by Incisive Media in 2007.

In 2000, the US IT portion of Miller Freeman was merged into CMP. CMP Channel (including CRN US) was spun off as UBM Channel and later went into management buyout as The Channel Company in 2013. The Channel Company later acquired technology division of Incisive Media and gained rights to CRN UK in 2022.

The music portions of CMP and Miller Freeman were spun off as Music Player Network, which managed by CMP Entertainment Media. The gaming portion (including Gamasutra and Game Developer Conference) was grouped into CMP GamaNetwork in early 2001.

Black Hat Briefings was acquired in 2005.

In May 2006, CMP Media changed its name to CMP Technology.

In September 2006, NewBay Media acquired CMP Entertainment Media from United Business Media. The trade book operations of CMP were sold to Elsevier and Hal Leonard.

In November 2006, Forbes reported that United Business Media had purchased the events assets of MediaLive International Inc. This transaction included COMDEX and Interop which later integrated into CMP Technology.

In 2008, United Business Media broke CMP into four divisions inside UBM, notably merged the IT portion of CMP into UBM TechWeb and the electronics portion into UBM Electronics. "Today, the name is gone and what's left of the company is part of the British media conglomerate, UBM plc," according to Newsday.

In September 2010, Canon Communications announced that it had agreed to be acquired by United Business Media and the deal was completed in October 2010, at which point the company was renamed UBM Canon. Electronics part of Canon (including EDN) later merged into UBM Electronics.

In July 2012, UBM TechWeb changed its name to UBM Tech.

On June 3, 2016, UBM announced that EE Times, along with the rest of the electronics media portfolio (EDN, Embedded.com, TechOnline and Datasheets.com) was being sold to AspenCore Media, a company owned by Arrow Electronics for $23.5 million. The acquisition was completed on August 1, 2016.

In January 2018, Informa announced the acquisition of UBM for £4 billion. The transaction was completed in June 2018.

Since the integration of UBM into Informa, UBM Technology Group was absorbed into the technology division of Informa, known as Informa Tech.

Informa Tech later merged its digital business with American business-to-business company TechTarget, became Informa TechTarget in December 2024.

== Markets served ==
Publications for the builders of technology include Dr. Dobb's Journal. Publications for the buyers of technology include InformationWeek, Network Computing for the corporate IT user; and targeted publications for the financial industry (Wall Street & Technology, Insurance & Technology, and Bank Systems & Technology).

UBM Technology Group key communities:

- Information Security
- Enterprise Communications
- Enterprise IT
- IT Services/Support and Contact Center
- Game and VR Development
- Content Marketing

UBM Technology Group (as CMP) co-produces the Web 2.0 Summit along with O'Reilly Media, and formerly the owner of the USPTO Service Mark 'WEB 2.0'.

Current UBM Technology Group assets:

- Black Hat
- Content Marketing Institute
- Content Marketing World
- ContentTECH Summit
- Dark Reading
- Enterprise Connect
- GDC
- Gamasutra
- HDI
- ICMI
- InformationWeek
- Interop
- Network Computing
- No Jitter
- Service Management World
- XRDC

== Gallery ==
CMP Media logo, used until 2001

CMP logo used until 2008

UBM Tech logo
