= Light Reading =

Telecommunications industry news website

- Screenshot of the website in December 2024
- Website type: Trade website
- Owner: Informa
- Creator: Stephen Saunders
- Website: www.lightreading.com
- Commercial: Yes

Light Reading Inc. is a telecommunications industry information company based in New York City. Its activities include publishing, data analysis, market research, and events management.

== History ==
The company was founded in 2000 by Stephen Saunders and was bought by UBM for $33 million in 2005, becoming part of the UBM subsidiary CMP Media. Saunders remained as CEO and launched Internet Evolution later in 2005.

Light Reading's market research arm, Heavy Reading, bought Pyramid Research in August 2008.

Light Reading also had its India publication, Light Reading India. The site had been covering the Indian telecom ecosystem from 2011 till January 2015. It was shut down when UBI India stopped its operations.

In August 2013, Light Reading migrated to UBM's DeusM community platform. In February 2014, Stephen Saunders reacquired Light Reading from UBM, with UBM retaining a "significant minority stake" in the company. Future plans for the company were said to include "bulking up the staff and changing up its media pricing"—according to Saunders, "with much of the overhead that a larger corporate structure imposes now gone, he will apply that savings to expanding staff and infrastructure as well as adjusting customer pricing downward."

In 2016, Light Reading was acquired by Informa.

== Big Telecom Event ==
In June 2014, Light Reading launched an annual summit for the telecommunications industry, the Big Telecom Event (BTE). The event was held in Chicago, and gathered "important figures in the industry together to discuss progress, problems, and what’s on the horizon as technology continues to develop at a rapid pace." Unusually, for an industry convention, the event included no exhibitors and no show floor; rather, "BTE provided an 'Innovation Zone' where more than 60 companies gave hands-on demos in turnkey booths."

== Awards ==
Among awards won by Light Reading are:

- 2014 Ava Digital Awards: gold award, business-to-business website category.
- 2014 Hermes Creative Awards: platinum award for infographic work in the Web Element: Other category, and four gold awards.
- 2014 Apex Awards: three awards of excellence in the Technical & Technology Writing, Best Resdesigns, and Identity and Graphic Standards categories.
