= MicroScope =

British computer trade magazine

- Editor: Simon Quicke
- Categories: Computer magazine
- Frequency: Bi-Monthly
- Founder: Dennis Publishing
- First issue: 23 September 1982
- Final issue: 28 March 2011 (print edition)
- Company: Informa TechTarget
- Country: United Kingdom
- Based in: London
- Language: English
- Website: Microscope section at Computer Weekly
- ISSN: 0269-5766
- OCLC: 928994660

MicroScope is a digital magazine and website for computer manufacturers, distributors and resellers within the IT channel in the United Kingdom. Based in London, the magazine is owned by Informa TechTarget; it formerly published as a weekly print magazine under Dennis Publishing Ltd and Reed Business Information for over 29 years. The last printed edition was published on Monday 28 March 2011, leaving only the online edition. The magazines prominent focus is news, analysis, and assessment of issues within the channel marketplace. It was available free to professionals who meet the circulation requirements with it being funded through revenue received from display and classified advertising. In the late 1990s, MicroScope remarked in its masthead “MicroScope – The No.1 news weekly for computer resellers and suppliers”.

Founded in 1982, MicroScope was first circulated by Dennis Publishing Ltd at a time of fundamental change in British computer industry with the microcomputer revolution. Over time, the magazine coverage expanded as the ICT channel emerged. MicroScope’s layout and format changed, adding opinion columns, financial news, US news, European news, City news, MicroSoap, Microscope classified, Spotlight, cartoons, special reports, reader letters and crosswords. The magazine is recognizable by its red nameplate and full-size image covers. Originally, MicroScope started out as a trade newspaper from its recognisable broadsheet traits, containing upwards of 200 pages on certain editions; towards the end of print life MicroScope had evolved into a magazine with its page size and number of pages decreased.

The current editor-in-chief Simon Quicke succeeded Billy MacInnes in 2002. MicroScope claims to be the longest running channel publication in the United Kingdom. Since 2011, the magazines’ content has been published digitally in an e-zine format. As of 2008, its print edition had a weekly circulation of 22,275, 143% up from 1995. MicroScope’s digital magazine and website receives more than 100,000 page views each month and has a significantly higher circulation that its print edition when it transferred to an online format. The magazine’s readership is generally made up of volume distributors, value-added distributors, resellers, MSPs, VARs, ISVs, and technology consultants. It has been named “Computer Journal of the Year” in 1984 by the Computer Press Association, for excellence in the field of computer journalism.

== History ==
=== 1982-1990 ===
Launched in 1982, the first issue of MicroScope was published on 23 September in broadsheet format. It was first produced by Dennis Publishing Ltd who during this period became a leading publisher of computer enthusiast magazines in the United Kingdom. Felix Dennis was chairman and Peter Jackson took control of the paper as its founding editor.

In the early 1980s, driven by a growth in sales of IBM microcomputers and with the arrival of distribution - particularly Northamber and Westcoast the ICT channel emerged.

=== 1990-1999 ===
In 1998, Dennis Publishing Ltd sold MicroScope to Reed Business Information, along with a number of other titles including The VAR, Network Reseller News and Business & Technology.

=== 2000-2011 ===
In the early 2000s, the magazine maintained its coverage of the industry which expanded to include specialist distributors, including the likes of Hammer, CMS Distribution, Magirus, Wick Hill and Zycko. The reseller level also adapted to increasingly complex customer needs with the emergence of technology and vertical market specialists.

MicroScope observed that the channel is moving more towards a subscription-based consumption model. There has been a growth in the number of managed service providers (MSPs) and most of the major distributors have established their own cloud marketplaces, providing applications and services.

The channel has continued to evolve and adapt to changing market needs and is now seen by many customers as the 'trusted advisors' helping them with their digital transformation needs. Over the course of the channel’s transformation the magazine consistently spectated and commented on the ICT channel marketplace, now through monthly digital magazines, but also with daily news content on the website.

=== From 2011 ===
In March 2011, MicroScope was sold to TechTarget ceasing print edition publication and became an online magazine; the last printed edition was published on Monday 28 March 2011. Computer Weekly published its last print edition on Tuesday 5 April 2011 and similarly transferred to a digital format.

In December 2024, TechTarget merged with digital business of Informa Tech owned by Informa. The resulting company became Informa TechTarget with Informa owning the majority stake at 57%.

== Content ==
Following the closure of the print edition, MicroScope became available only online and in a monthly digital format.

The classic audience for the magazine works within the 'two-tier' channel, either in distribution or at a reseller level. The readership includes volume distributors, value-added distributors, resellers, MSPs, VARs, ISVs and technology consultants.

Over the past 40 years the channel has matured and continues to go through a process of consolidation. During the time the magazine has been publishing computers have become mainstream and the concept of the microcomputer is fundamentally accepted in both workplace and home.

== Editors ==
The editor-in-chief, commonly known simply as “the Editor”, of MicroScope is charged with formulating the magazine's editorial policies and overseeing corporate operations. Since its 1982 founding, the editors have been:

- Peter Jackson: 1982 - 1984
- Jerry Saunders: 1984-1986

- Mike Foreman: 1986-1987

- John Lettice: 1987 - 1991
- Keith Rodgers: 1991 - 1996
- Billy MacInnes: 1996 - 2002
- Simon Quicke: 2002–present

== Awards ==
MicroScope was awarded “Computer Journal of the Year” in 1984 by the Computer Press Association, for excellence in the field of computer journalism.

=== MicroScope ACEs ===
The MicroScope Awards for Channel Excellence (MicroScope ACEs) were launched in 2007 as prestigious awards with the aim of rewarding the achievements of distributors and resellers across the channel.

The entry process for the awards would kick off around November or Late October with the award ceremony usually taking place in late May or Early June in Central London.

The awards were judged by a panel of industry experts including analysts, independent consultants and editorial staff from MicroScope. The shortlist drawn up by the judges was then posted online with the readership of the magazine then given an opportunity to vote for the winners.

Award Categories as follows:

Reseller

- SME reseller of the year
- Storage reseller of the year
- AV reseller of the year
- Networking/comms reseller of the year
- security reseller of the year

Distributor

- Security distributor of the year
- Storage distributor of the year
- Networking/comms distributor of the year
- AV distributor of the year

Editor's choice

- Vendor of the year

During their first 3 years, the Microscope ACE’s grew and established themselves as one of the leading industry awards. Following the sale of MicroScope to TechTarget, the 2011 awards ceremony was postponed.

The ACEs continued to run digitally until 2016 before the format was postponed awaiting future development.

=== 25th Anniversary Awards ===
25th anniversary awards as follows:

- Most influential person of the past 25 years
- Most significant vendor of the past 25 years
- Most significant distributor of the past 25 years
- Most significant reseller of the past 25 years

== Related Publications ==
MicroScope is a sister publication of ComputerWeekly.com and is part of the TechTarget network of websites that also includes SearchITchannel.com, which covers the channel activities in the US market.

== See also ==
- List of computer magazines
- List of magazines in the United Kingdom
