= PHONE+ =

American trade publication

PHONE+ is a monthly trade publication for communication distribution channels providing news and strategic information to private-label resellers, agents, brokers, VARs, systems integrators, interconnects and dealers that deliver bundled voice, data, wireless, Internet and content services, and CPE. The magazine was established in 1987 and has a circulation of 20,000. The publication also is the sponsor of the Channel Partners Conference & Expo. It was published by Virgo Publishing's Telecom Division, based in Phoenix, Arizona, U.S.A. Virgo was acquired by Informa in 2014. Then the magazine was renamed as Channel Partners.
