= Inhalation Toxicology =

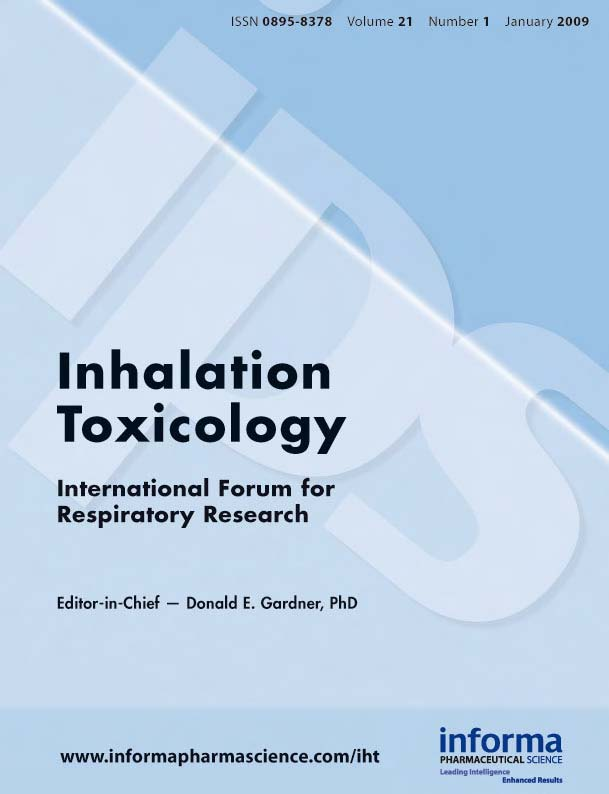
- Discipline: Toxicology, public health, respiratory health
- Language: English
- Edited by: Donald E. Gardner

Publication details
- History: 1989-present
- Publisher: Informa
- Frequency: 14/year
- Impact factor: 2.26 (2014)

Standard abbreviations
- ISO 4: Inhal. Toxicol.

Indexing
- ISSN: 0895-8378 (print); 1091-7691 (web)

Inhalation Toxicology is a monthly peer-reviewed medical journal that publishes review articles on the mechanisms, responses and assessments of toxins. It is published by Informa. The editor in chief is Donald E. Gardner. Inhalation Toxicology publishes 14 issues per year in simultaneous print and online editions.

According to the Journal Citation Reports, its 2014 impact factor is 2.26, ranking it 48th out of 87 journals in the category Toxicology.
