= Pop Con YXE =

Annual fan convention in Saskatoon, Canada

- Status: Active
- Genre: Comic, pop culture
- Venue: Prairieland Park
- Locations: Saskatoon, Saskatchewan
- Country: Canada
- Inaugurated: 2013
- Organizer: Prairieland Park
- Website: saskatoon.saskexpo.com

Pop Con YXE (formerly the Saskatoon Entertainment Expo) is an annual fan convention held at Prairieland Park in Saskatoon, Saskatchewan.

== History ==
The event was founded by Mike Fisher and Chris Bernhard of Saskatoon as the Saskatchewan Entertainment Expo, who sought to provide a local alternative to out-of-province events in locations such as Alberta. The inaugural edition was held in 2013; major guests included William B. Davis, Grey DeLisle, and Kevin Conroy, as well as comic book writers Ian Boothby, Pia Guerra and Marcus To among others.

To expand the event, the convention partnered with the Calgary Comic and Entertainment Expo in 2014, and was renamed the Saskatoon Comic and Entertainment Expo (SCEE). Notable guests that year included actor Robert Englund, Phil LaMarr, and Brandon Routh. William Shatner appeared at the 2015 edition; attendance had grown to around 15,000. Carrie Fisher attended in 2016.

Fan Expo—which had begun to run their own event at Regina's Evraz Place in 2014—acquired the organizers of Calgary Expo in late-2017. As a result, the partnership was disbanded, and the convention reverted to the Saskatchewan Entertainment Expo title in 2018. Doug Jones, Ron Perlman, Gates McFadden, Jim Cummings, John Ratzenberger, Julian Glover, Jewel Staite, Pat Mastroianni, and Stacie Mistysyn were featured as guests. Billy Dee Williams was scheduled to attend, but cancelled due to conflicts with film work; this cancellation resulted in speculation — later confirmed — that Williams would reprise the role of Lando Calrissian in the upcoming Star Wars: The Rise of Skywalker.

In October 2018, Fan Expo announced that its Regina event would be discontinued, citing the size of the market as a factor in the decision. Saskatchewan Entertainment Expo subsequently announced that it would hold an inaugural Regina edition at Evraz Place's International Trade Centre in May 2019.

On January 27, 2019, it was announced that the Saskatoon event had been sold to Prairieland Park, would be renamed the Saskatoon Entertainment Expo in 2021, and move to April. Both the 2020 and 2021 conventions were cancelled due to the COVID-19 pandemic. The event returned under its new ownership in 2022.

Following the 2024 edition, it was announced that the event would be renamed Pop Con YXE beginning in 2025.
