= Somatosensory & Motor Research =

- Discipline: Neurology, Psychophysiology
- Language: English
- Edited by: Thomas A. Woolsey

Publication details
- History: 1983–present
- Publisher: Informa (United Kingdom)
- Frequency: Quarterly
- Impact factor: 0.909 (2016)

Standard abbreviations
- ISO 4: Somatosens. Mot. Res.

Indexing
- CODEN: SMOREZ
- ISSN: 0899-0220 (print); 1369-1651 (web)
- LCCN: 90640737
- OCLC no.: 17973711

Links
- Journal homepage

Somatosensory & Motor Research is a peer-reviewed medical journal that covers all topics relating to the neural bases for somatic sensation, somatic motor function, somatic motor integration, and modeling thereof. The journal has been published quarterly by Informa since 1983. According to the Journal Citation Reports, the journal had a 2016 impact factor of 0.909.

== Editor ==
The editor in chief of Somatosensory & Motor Research is Thomas A. Woolsey (Washington University School of Medicine, USA).

== Abstracting and indexing ==
Somatosensory & Motor Research is abstracted and indexed in Biological Abstracts, Current Contents EMBASE/Excerpta Medica, Index Medicus/MEDLINE, PsycINFO, Science Citation Index, and Scopus.
