= Quidditch in Canada =

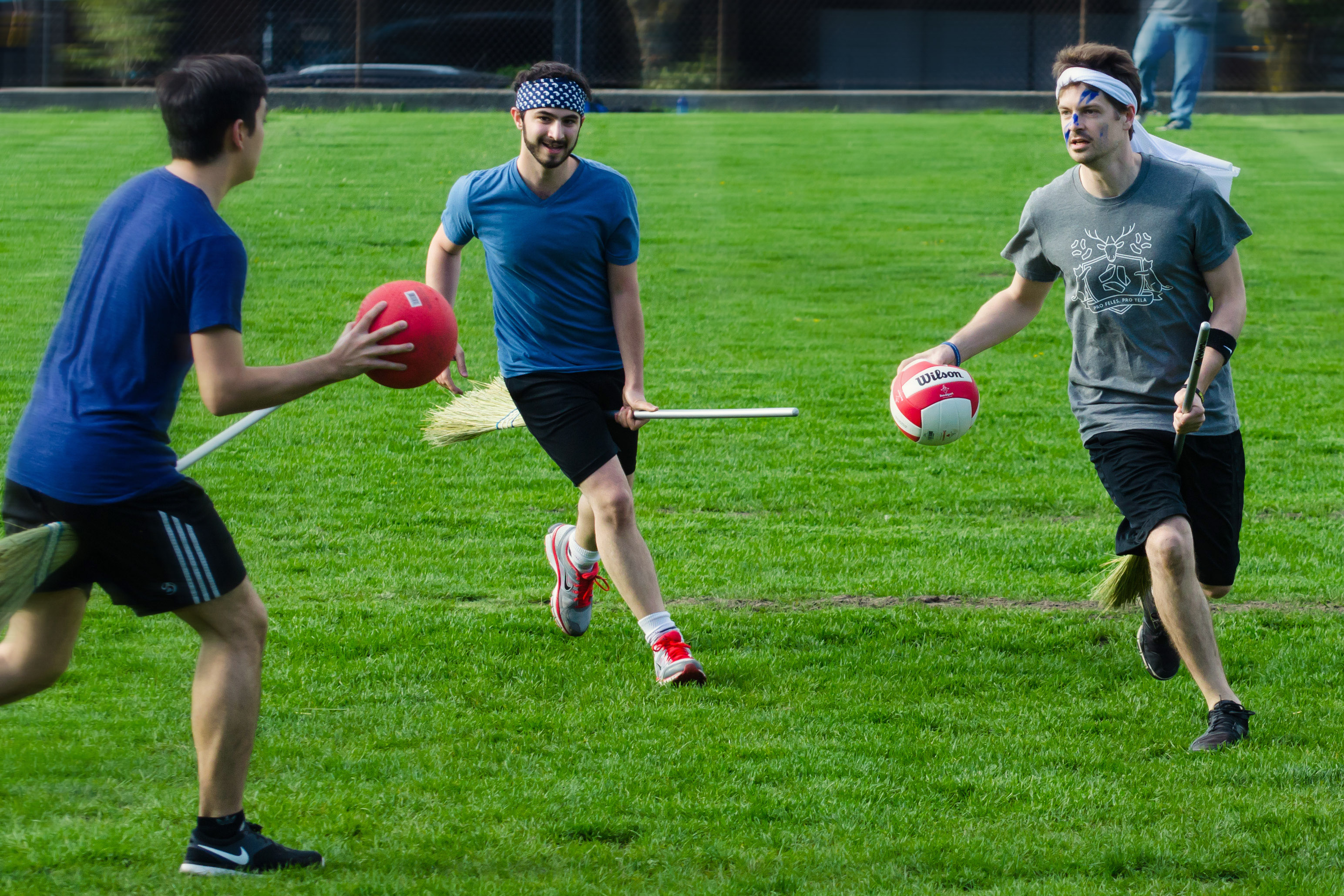
- A game of quidditch in progress in Vancouver
- Country: Canada
- Governing body: Quidditch Canada
- National team: National quidditch team
- First played: 2008, McGill University
- Registered players: 500 (estimate total)
- Clubs: 33

National competitions
- IQA Global Games

Club competitions
- Major League Quidditch; Quidditch Canada Nationals

Quidditch is a growing team sport in Canada. Due to its relative youth within the sports scene of Canada, adoption is not as widespread as other sports such as rugby or ultimate. However, adoption is picking up with additional university and community teams each year. As a result of its inclusivity and its many niche styles of play, a wider spectrum of individuals are drawn to this sport than other mainstream sports. For the moment, the majority of teams are based in Ontario, Quebec, British Columbia and Alberta, but teams are rapidly starting up in Saskatchewan, Nova Scotia and Manitoba. Quidditch Canada is the governing body for the sport across the country; there are no associations within Quidditch Canada that govern provincially/territorially.

Outside of the United States, Canada has had the fastest and most fervent adoption of the sport since its creation in 2005 at Middlebury College in Vermont. The first teams began in Quebec and Ontario in 2009, often sending teams to the US "World Cup". Nowadays, there are about 500 players across the country registered with Quidditch Canada, all belonging to either community or university-affiliated teams. Canada is one of the top nations in the world in regards to quidditch, coming in third place at the international level at the 2014 IQA Global Games and hosting one of the most developed National Governing Bodies (NGB).

== Popularity ==
After its creation in 2005, Canada was the first nation outside of the United States to adopt quidditch. Immediately following the creation of teams at Carleton and McGill, teams began to pop up around Ontario. The first team on the West Coast was the University of Victoria Valkyries who made the trip to New York for the former World Cup. Recently, the Lower Mainland of BC, all of Southern Ontario, parts of Quebec, and Central Alberta have become hotspots for quidditch, with efforts being made to bring the sport to the remaining provinces and territories.

As quidditch is still a relatively unknown sport, no significant fan following exists in Canada (or elsewhere). However, where there are popular teams there is a minor fan base that is anticipated to become stronger the more widespread the sport becomes.

== History ==
The first quidditch team within Canada was at McGill University where first years came together to start an ad-hoc club on campus. Like many teams before and after their creation, McGill's team began on sticks from the local foliage as brooms with hoops being hula-hoops suspended from local trees serving as goals. On October 26, 2008, McGill travelled to the States to be the first non-American team to compete in the second "Quidditch World Cup" where thirteen teams participated. In 2009, McGill attended the third World Cup with 22 teams, where they came in 12th place after having been defeated by the eventual victors, Middlebury College, in the quarter-finals. Finally, in January 2010, Carleton University became the host to Canada's second quidditch team and the first in Ontario. Also in January, McGill players travelled to the University of Toronto to help introduce the sport. In March 2010, McGill and Carleton faced off at McGill in the first ever inter-university quidditch match in Canada with McGill winning two matches to one. During the summer in July, Ryerson University formed their team. In September of that year, the International Quidditch Association created a membership programme of which four teams; McGill, U of T, Ryerson and Carleton, became official IQA members.

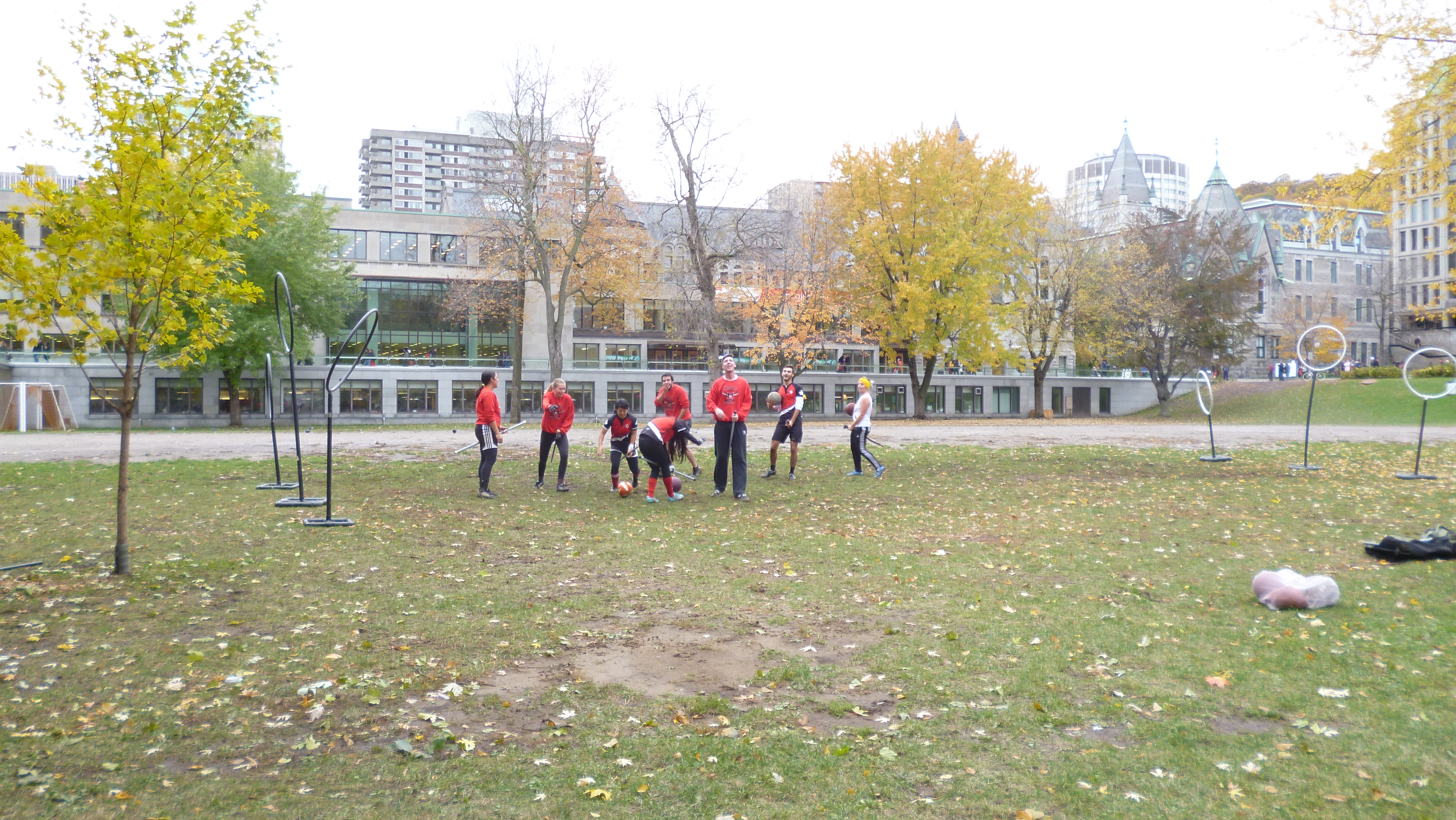
A game of quidditch in progress at McGill University. The first quidditch team within Canada was established at McGill.

The 2010-2011 season, beginning roughly in September, saw the expansion of quidditch out west with the creation of the University of British Columbia's and the University of Calgary's teams. In November, the fourth World Cup saw four Canadian teams in attendance: McGill, Carleton, U of T and Ryerson, coming in 16th, 32nd, 43rd and 45th place out of 46, respectively. Carleton University travelled in January 2010 to the University of Ottawa to help introduce the sport, and, in July, the University of Victoria became an IQA member, the first team west of Ontario to do so. By October 2011, teams had already popped up at Queen's University and McMaster University, and Carleton University hosts the first "Canada Cup" on October 29 where McGill, Carleton and uOttawa placed first, second and third. The fifth World Cup saw five Canadian teams present in November where there were 60 division I teams, 24 division II and eight secondary school teams. McGill, Carleton, uOttawa and UVic came in 15th, 23rd, 39th, and 54th place, respectively, in division I with Ryerson coming in 23rd place in division II.

Western quidditch continued to advance in BC in 2012 when in February UBC travelled to Vancouver Island to compete against UVic, with UVic trumping UBC two matches to one. During the summer, the first ever national Canadian quidditch team is formed in response to the IQA Summer Games being held in London, UK. Team Canada was composed of players who were financially and logistically able to travel to the UK rather than superior players from across the country. Team Canada placed fourth of five teams, losing by a hair to France and Australia in the finals. By October 2012, teams were created at the University of Guelph, the University of Toronto Scarborough and at Fleming College.

The second annual Canada Cup (then, Canadian Cup) was hosted by Queen's University where McGill, Carleton and uOttawa emerged victorious, being granted spots at the sixth World Cup. Due to distance, none of the western teams can make it to the Canada Cup and begin a close relationship with American teams. UBC, in February 2013, travelled to the Western Cup, the regional championship for the IQA along the west coast of the United States held in Sacramento, where they did not advance to the second day. In March, quidditch expands within BC with the Cascadia Cup being held in Vancouver by UBC where the Burnaby Boggarts (being formed in January 2013) and UVic face off. At the same time, the University of Northern British Columbia begin holding practices, but the team soon withers away due to lack of local competition. In the east, teams start up on the University of Toronto's Mississauga campus and at York University. For the sixth World Cup in Kissimmee, Florida, three Canadian teams travel there to compete (uOttawa, Fleming College and U of T). At the same time, the teams of University of Calgary and University of Alberta meet for the first time by showcasing quidditch at the Calgary Comic and Entertainment Expo.

The summer of 2013 sees the formation of Quebec's second team at the Université de Montréal, the third Albertan team in Red Deer named Central Alberta Quidditch, a team at the University of Waterloo and a university team at Simon Fraser University.

Alberta, in 2014, hosts the first quidditch games. Yearly, Canada sees several fantasy tournaments, the biggest is CDFT.

== Competitions ==
Previously, Canadian quidditch was an extension of American quidditch before the creation of the truly international IQA, and tournaments were held routinely on both sides of the border with a greater concentration happening on the States side. Yearly, Eastern Canadian teams would participate in the Canada Cup which served as the regional championship used for seeding the "World Cup". However, after the split in 2014, Canadian teams are represented under Quidditch Canada which hosts three tournaments: Western Regionals, Eastern Regionals and Nationals.

=== International Competitions ===
Canada has participated in every international tournament run by the International Quidditch Association in which they were eligible. The two tournaments, held in 2012 and 2014, respectively, were the IQA Summer Games and the IQA Global Games.

The 2012 IQA Summer Games, held in London, England was the first tournament where nations sent teams to represent themselves instead of having clubs participate. Quidditch Canada (at the time called the Canadian Quidditch Association or Alliance), being a relatively young organization, sent a group of players based on their ability to finance and go themselves. The team ultimately came in fourth place out of five teams present, however the game against France was evenly matched for second or third place and the third or fourth place match against Australia saw Team Canada wounded after having played several matches in a row and lost on a snitch catch.

Team Canada once again presented itself for the 2014 Global Games held in Burnaby, BC (run by USQuidditch) where the team came just shy of defeated Team Australia and finished in third place of seven teams.

=== Domestic Competitions ===
The 2014/2015 season saw the beginnings of Canadian-run domestic championships in the form of "Regionals". However, previously, Eastern Canadian teams relied on the Canada Cup for placement within the US "World Cup" and the Western Teams participated in Western Regionals of the United States.

The 2014/15 regionals were held in the East and West in Kingston and Moose Jaw, respectively. The Eastern Regionals were held on February 7, 2015 where sixteen teams participated. The results were:

2014 Eastern Regionals Results
Place	Team	Score	Time	Score	Team	Place
1	McGill Quidditch	190	22:55	90*	Carleton University Quidditch	2
3	Queen's Quidditch Club	70	19:30	110*	McGill Quidditch	-
3	Waterloo Ridgebacks	100	23:16	160*	Carleton University Quidditch	-

The Western Regionals being held in Moose Jaw posed a problem to many western teams who did not manage to make it to the tournament. However, two teams did make their way to Saskatchewan on February 1, 2015 being the Alberta Clippers and the Winnipeg Whomping Willows, coming in first and second place, respectively.

The Nationals will be held in Burnaby, BC on March 28, 2015 at Swangard Stadium.

== See also ==
- Canada national quidditch team
