= UBM Aviation =

Aerospace company

- Type: division of UBM plc
- Industry: Aviation
- Products: Data; Analytics; Consulting Services; Events; Media
- Website: www.ubm.com

UBM Aviation was a business providing data, analytics, consulting, media and event services to the air transport industry, principally the passenger aviation, air cargo logistics, maintenance repair & overhaul (MRO) and business travel sectors. Its brands included OAG, OAG Cargo, Routes, ASM, UBM Aviation Events and UBM Aviation Media. The company operated worldwide from offices in the UK, USA, Singapore, China, Japan and The Netherlands. It was owned by UBM plc before the OAG brand was sold in 2013. The remaining brands including Routes & ASM are now part of UBM plc.

UBM Aviation was created in December 2008 when its parent, UBM, reorganised all of its airline-related businesses into one company. The company has evolved through a number of acquisitions, beginning with BACK Aviation Solutions and Air Cargo World acquired by UBM in mid-2006; OAG in December 2006; Aviation Industry Group in January 2007; AeroStrategy's MRO data business in 2008; and The Route Development Group and Airport Strategy & Marketing (ASM) in August 2010.

The Company provided a range of consulting services for air service development, network audits, airport marketing, airport investment and aircraft manufacturing. These services are provided worldwide by its ASM (Airport Strategy & Marketing) business. ASM received the Best Airport Consultancy award from the Airport Operators Association (AOA) in 2010.
