= Expert Review of Gastroenterology & Hepatology =

- Discipline: Gastroenterology, hepatology
- Language: English

Publication details
- History: 2007–present
- Publisher: Informa
- Frequency: 12/year
- Impact factor: 2.991 (2018)

Standard abbreviations
- ISO 4: Expert Rev. Gastroenterol. Hepatol.

Indexing
- ISSN: 1747-4124 (print); 1747-4132 (web)
- OCLC no.: 500360103

Links
- Journal homepage; Online access; Online archive

Expert Review of Gastroenterology & Hepatology is a peer-reviewed medical journal covering all aspects of gastroenterology and hepatology. It was established in 2007 and is published by Informa.

== Abstracting and indexing ==
The journal is abstracted and indexed in:

- Chemical Abstracts
- Current Contents/Clinical Medicine
- EMBASE/Excerpta Medica
- EMCare
- MEDLINE/Index Medicus/PubMed
- Science Citation Index Expanded
- Scopus
- Journal Citation Reports/Science Edition

According to the Journal Citation Reports, the journal has a 2018 impact factor of 2.991.
