= Design News =

American business-to-business media brand

- Categories: Engineering
- Founded: 1946
- Company: Informa Markets — Engineering
- Country: United States
- Based in: Santa Monica, California
- Language: English
- Website: designnews.com

Design News is a business-to-business media brand covering news, trends, and technology insights for the engineering community. Owned by Informa Markets — Engineering, it is headquartered in Santa Monica, California. The brand has been in publication since 1946.

== History and ownership ==
Design News began as a monthly print magazine, serving design, mechanical, and electrical engineers. As of December 2014, its print circulation was audited at 96,667 by the BPA. In 2010, Reed Business Information sold Design News—along with other U.S. electronics titles—to Canon Communications. Canon was subsequently acquired by United Business Media (UBM). In 2018, Informa purchased UBM in a deal valued at $5.3 billion. Over time, Design News transitioned to an online-only publication, although it retains its original focus on engineering and manufacturing topics.

== Coverage ==
Design News serves engineers in the aerospace, automotive, consumer electronics/appliance, government/defense, industrial machinery, medical device, robotics, and other high-tech markets. Editorial topics include design engineering, design for manufacturing, automation, artificial intelligence, materials science, motion control, 3D printing, digitalization, power/energy, and sustainability. It also addresses engineering career development and education.
