= CFO (magazine) =

American trade magazine

- Senior Editor: Lauren Muskett
- Reporter: Adam Zaki
- Founded: 1985
- Company: Industry Dive (Informa TechTarget)
- Country: United States
- Based in: New York
- Language: English
- Website: www.cfo.com
- ISSN: 8756-7113

CFO.com (formerly CFO Magazine) is an online publication owned by Industry Dive. Once a top B2B magazine, it launched in 1985 for chief financial officers (CFOs) and other financial executives in companies in the U.S. The Economist Group acquired the magazine in 1988 and sold it in 2010 to the private equity firm Seguin Partners. The website CFO.com was launched in October 2000. In 2016, CFO Magazine and CFO.com were bought from Sequin Partners by Argyle Executive Forum. And finally in 2020 CFO Magazine and CFO.com were acquired by Industry Dive, a business-to-business publisher that provides news to industry executives. Industry Dive shut down the magazine in the spring of 2021.

CFO.com is now the host of all CFO Magazine content. It produces a mixture of regional and global content aimed at CFOs and other decision makers in their respective industries. CFO.com reaches 440,000 individually qualified readers. The Daily Balance, a daily email newsletter, and The Weekly Close, a weekend-centric newsletter, is the main component of CFO.com's content outside of the website. The publication also runs a LinkedIn newsletter called Preferred Shares and hosts multiple virtual events a year.

CFO.com's full-time staff includes Senior Editor Lauren Muskett, Reporter Adam Zaki and Reporter Dan Niepow.
