= Test & Measurement World =

- Type: Business magazine
- Format: Paper and Digital Magazine
- Owner: UBM
- Editor: Patrick Mannion
- Founded: 1981
- Ceased publication: July 2012
- Language: English
- Headquarters: San Francisco, California, United States
- Circulation: 54,149
- ISSN: 0744-1657
- Website: tmworld.com

Test & Measurement World (ISSN 0744-1657) was a magazine published from January 1981 to July 2012 and website that was stopped in June 2013 by UBM Electronics, a division of United Business Media. Former owner Reed Business Information sold the magazine to Canon Communications in February 2010; in October 2010 Canon Communications was acquired by United Business Media.

== Magazine ==
Test & Measurement World served the information needs of engineers in the electronic original equipment market (EOEM), which includes manufacturers of test equipment, medical equipment, aircraft, and aerospace, automotive, consumer electronics, and other products and services, as well as engineers in the electronic test, measurement, and inspection industries. Engineers can access technical information geared for on-the-job application, as well as industry news, coverage of the latest standards and technologies, application notes, product specifications, how-to articles, industry events, blogs, and contests. Over 54,000 individuals in engineering management, engineering technical/staff, and corporate and general management rely on Test & Measurement World to keep them up-to-date on current developments, regulatory requirements, trends, and innovations in the test and measurement marketplace.

The magazine was initially based in Boston. The Director of content was Patrick Mannion, with the editorial offices located in Manhasset, New York, USA.

From 1991 to 2012, Test & Measurement World presented an annual "Best in Test Product" awards to honor innovative new products and services in the electronics test and measurement industry. Several other awards are also presented including the Test of Time award and the Test Engineer of the Year award.

On June 12, 2012, UBM Electronics announced plans to launch a newly redesigned Test & Measurement World website. The objective of the new site, according to Patrick Mannion, is to better serve the needs of Test & Measurement World's community of electronics design and test engineers, developers, and industry-related management through an interactive, two-way experience and dialog around key areas of design and test, while providing more opportunities to learn from – and contribute to – the site's vast array of highly technical content, regular blogs on hot topics, networking opportunities, webinars, courses, and tools. With the July website relaunch UBM Electronics will shutter the print version of the brand, making a July/August combined issue the last issue.

On April 9, 2013, UBM announced that Test & Measurement World online (TMWorld.com) would shut down and the domain would redirect to the new Test & Measurement Design Center at their EDN.com domain.
