= Russ Shaw =

British Entrepreneur

Russ Shaw CBE
- Born: Russ Shaw; United States
- Education: Washington University in St. Louis; Harvard Business School
- Occupations: Business executive; technology sector advocate
- Years active: 1990s–present
- Known for: Founder of Tech London Advocates; Founder of Global Tech Advocates; Co-founder of London Tech Week
- Spouse: Lesley Hill
- Website: Tech London Advocates – Official site

Russ Shaw CBE is a British business executive and founder of Tech London Advocates and Global Tech Advocates. He has been involved in initiatives supporting the development of technology ecosystems, digital skills, and industry collaboration in the United Kingdom and internationally.

== Early life and education ==
Shaw was born in the United States and received a Bachelor of Science in Business Administration (BSBA) from Washington University in St. Louis, graduating in 1985. After completing his undergraduate studies, he worked at Ernst & Whinney (now part of Ernst & Young) in Los Angeles for two years before enrolling in an MBA programme at Harvard Business School where he met his future wife Lesley Hill. In 1992, Shaw moved to London, originally on a temporary basis. He remained in the United Kingdom and subsequently held roles in finance and technology, including involvement in initiatives related to the development of the city’s tech sector.

== Career ==
Shaw has held senior roles at companies including Skype, Telefonica, and Virgin Media. He w as Chief Executive Officer of Mobileway, a mobile messaging company later acquired by Sybase. At Skype, he was Vice President and General Manager for Europe, the Middle East, and Africa, where he oversaw the rollout of mobile services prior to the company’s acquisition by Microsoft in 2011.

In 2013, Shaw founded Tech London Advocates, a private-sector network intended to support London’s technology sector and address digital skills gaps. The organization operates through multiple working groups focused on areas such as talent development, investment, and sector-specific innovation. Shaw was a co-founder of London Tech Week, an annual technology event launched in 2014. The event brings together companies, investors, and policymakers to discuss developments in the technology sector.

In 2015, Shaw established Global Tech Advocates as an extension of the Tech London Advocates model. The network connects technology communities across multiple countries and promotes collaboration between startups, investors, and policymakers.

Shaw has contributed to discussions on topics including digital skills, workforce diversity, and technology policy. He has written and spoken about the role of collaboration between industry, government, and academia in supporting technology sector growth. His commentary has also addressed areas such as fintech, artificial intelligence, and regional technology development.

== Recognition ==
Shaw has been included in industry rankings such as the UKtech50 list compiled by Computer Weekly. In 2021, he was appointed a Commander of the Order of the British Empire (CBE) for services to technology and business.
