= Abu Dhabi Medical Congress =

Medical healthcare exhibition and conference

Coordinates: 24.419814°N 54.437269°E

- Status: Active
- Genre: Healthcare, Medical, Medical technology
- Venue: Abu Dhabi National Exhibition Centre
- Location: Abu Dhabi
- Country: United Arab Emirates
- Attendance: 5000+
- Organized by: Informa Exhibitions
- Website: www.abudhabimed.com

Abu Dhabi Medical Congress, popularly known as Abu Dhabi Med, is a medical healthcare exhibition and conference held annually at Abu Dhabi, United Arab Emirates. It is the only event in the world that brings Emergency services, Patient Safety, Primary Healthcare and Rehabilitation businesses, organizations and professionals together under-one-roof for scientific and commercial exchange. During the event, international and local companies to showcase their latest products and innovations within the Emergency, Primary Healthcare, Patient Safety, Rehabilitation and Dentistry sectors. The Congress also serves as a platform for scientific exchange via the accompanying multi-track conference programme dedicated to these healthcare areas. It is organised by Informa Exhibitions which also organises Arab Health. The Abu Dhabi Medical Congress is the fastest growing event of its kind.

It is held annually at the Abu Dhabi National Exhibition Centre (ADNEC) and the event attracts more than 5000 professionals working in the Primary Healthcare, Emergency, Patient Safety, Rehabilitation and Pharma sectors across the Middle East. In 2011 the Abu Dhabi Medical Exhibition & Congress occupied over 5,000 square meters with 120 exhibitors from 24 countries showcasing their products and services at the event. Exhibitors showcase ambulances, defibrillators, immobilization devices, mobile surgical equipment, rapid infusion systems, pharmaceuticals, diagnostics, disposables, dietary management systems, autoclaves, bandages & dressings, clinical waste management, dental equipment & supplies, disinfectants.

Alongside the exhibition runs a congress programme to discuss current goals, review tools for implementation, and meet the challenges of new and emerging healthcare dilemmas in the region. Ten different CME accredited congresses with a panel of more than 250 international speakers analyse the current best approaches for each sector involved in the congress.

== Abu Dhabi Med Conferences ==
=== Emergency Congress ===
The Emergency Congress & Exhibition co-locates with four other vertical events at the Abu Dhabi Medical Congress. It brings together regional and international emergency service professionals along with product manufacturers and distributor.

=== Primary Healthcare Exhibition & Congress ===
The Primary Healthcare Congress is a business-to-business forum for the Middle East's primary Healthcare sector. It covers a range of products and services including pharmaceuticals, healthcare management software, clinical research, diagnostics. The congress also hosts three conferences from current trends in pharma, through to bone & joint and family medicine.

=== Patient Safety Exhibition & Congress ===
The Patient Safety Congress is an interactive platform for patient safety and infection control.

=== Middle East Rehabilitation Exhibition & Conference ===
The Rehabilitation Exhibition & Congress is a platform which showcases all products and services related to rehabilitation including mobility aids and physiotherapy equipment. The show vertical also include a three-day conference for rehabilitation specialists.

=== The Dentistry Exhibition & Congress ===
The event demonstrates the latest technologies from companies specialized in dental, sterilization, patient safety and infection control equipment to a body of senior dentists.

=== Nursing Conference ===
It is a three-day conference focused on the role of nurses in the management of various diseases and patient cases, and highlight the importance of nursing research in the field of acute and critical care.
