= WHX =

WHX may refer to:

- Arab Health a conference which has been renamed to WHX Dubai
- Wheeling-Pittsburgh Steel, the current name of WHX Corporation
