= Packaging Digest =

American business-to-business media brand

- Format: Website
- Owner: Informa Markets — Engineering
- Executive editor: Lisa McTigue Pierce
- Founded: 1963
- Language: English
- Headquarters: Santa Monica, California, US
- ISSN: 0030-9117
- Website: packagingdigest.com

Packaging Digest is a business-to-business media brand that covers packaging operations for companies in industries such as food, beverages, pharmaceuticals, and medical devices. It is owned by Informa Markets — Engineering, headquartered in Santa Monica, California, and has been in publication since 1963.

== Coverage and audience ==
Packaging Digest serves packaging executives, engineers, designers, and developers, providing insights on topics like sustainability, automation, artificial intelligence, and career development in the packaging field. Alongside its main website, the publication puts out email newsletters, e-books, and webinars. It also posts content on LinkedIn, X, and Facebook.

== History ==
Packaging Digest started as a print magazine in 1963 and reached a BPA-audited circulation of 90,045 by June 2008. It was originally owned by Reed Business Information until being sold to Canon Communications in 2010. Later that year, Canon Communications was acquired by UBM, which was itself purchased by Informa in 2018 for $5.3 billion. That acquisition brought Packaging Digest under Informa Markets — Engineering.

== Industry recognition ==
Various third-party resources, including ThomasNet and World-Newspapers.com, list Packaging Digest among the top magazines for packaging professionals.

== Executive editor ==
Lisa McTigue Pierce oversees content as the executive editor.
