= Expert Review of Cardiovascular Therapy =

- Discipline: Cardiology
- Language: English

Publication details
- History: 2003-present
- Publisher: Informa
- Frequency: Monthly

Standard abbreviations
- ISO 4: Expert Rev. Cardiovasc. Ther.

Indexing
- ISSN: 1477-9072 (print); 1744-8344 (web)

Links
- Journal homepage; Online access; Online archive

Expert Review of Cardiovascular Therapy is a monthly peer-reviewed medical journal covering all aspects of cardiology. It was established in 2003 and is published by Informa. The journal is abstracted and indexed in Index Medicus/MEDLINE/PubMed, Embase/Excerpta Medica, EMCare, Chemical Abstracts, Scopus, and CINAHL.
