= Stamped concrete =

Concrete that has been imprinted

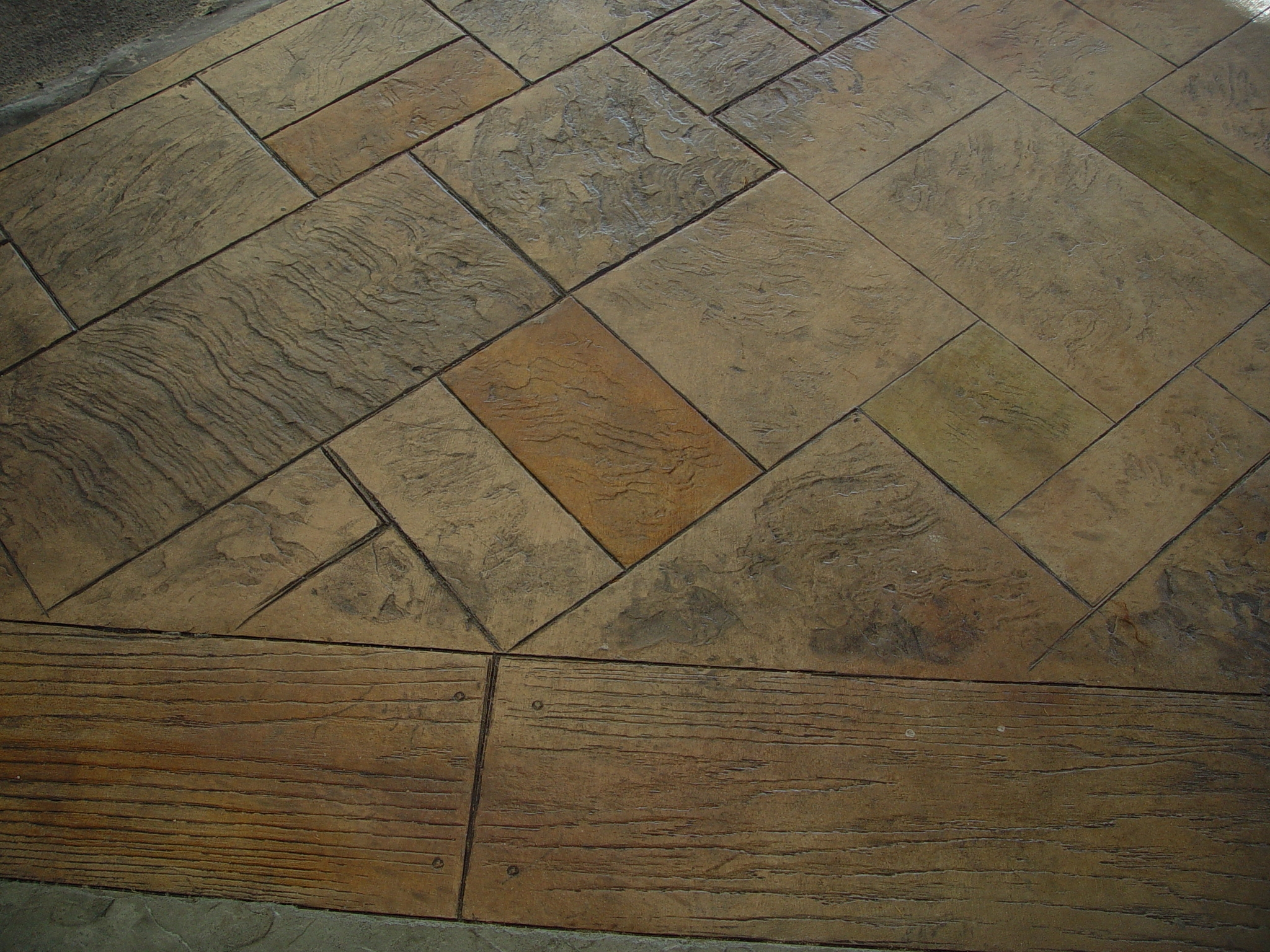
Modern stamped concrete resembling natural wood and stone

Stamped concrete is concrete that has been imprinted, or that is patterned, textured, or embossed to resemble brick, slate, flagstone, stone, tile, wood, or various other patterns and textures. The practice of stamping concrete for various purposes began with the ancient Romans. In the nineteenth and twentieth centuries, concrete was sometimes stamped with contractor names and years during public works projects, but by the late twentieth century the term "stamped concrete" came to refer primarily to decorative concrete produced with special modern techniques for use in patios, sidewalks, driveways, pool decks, and interior flooring.

== History ==
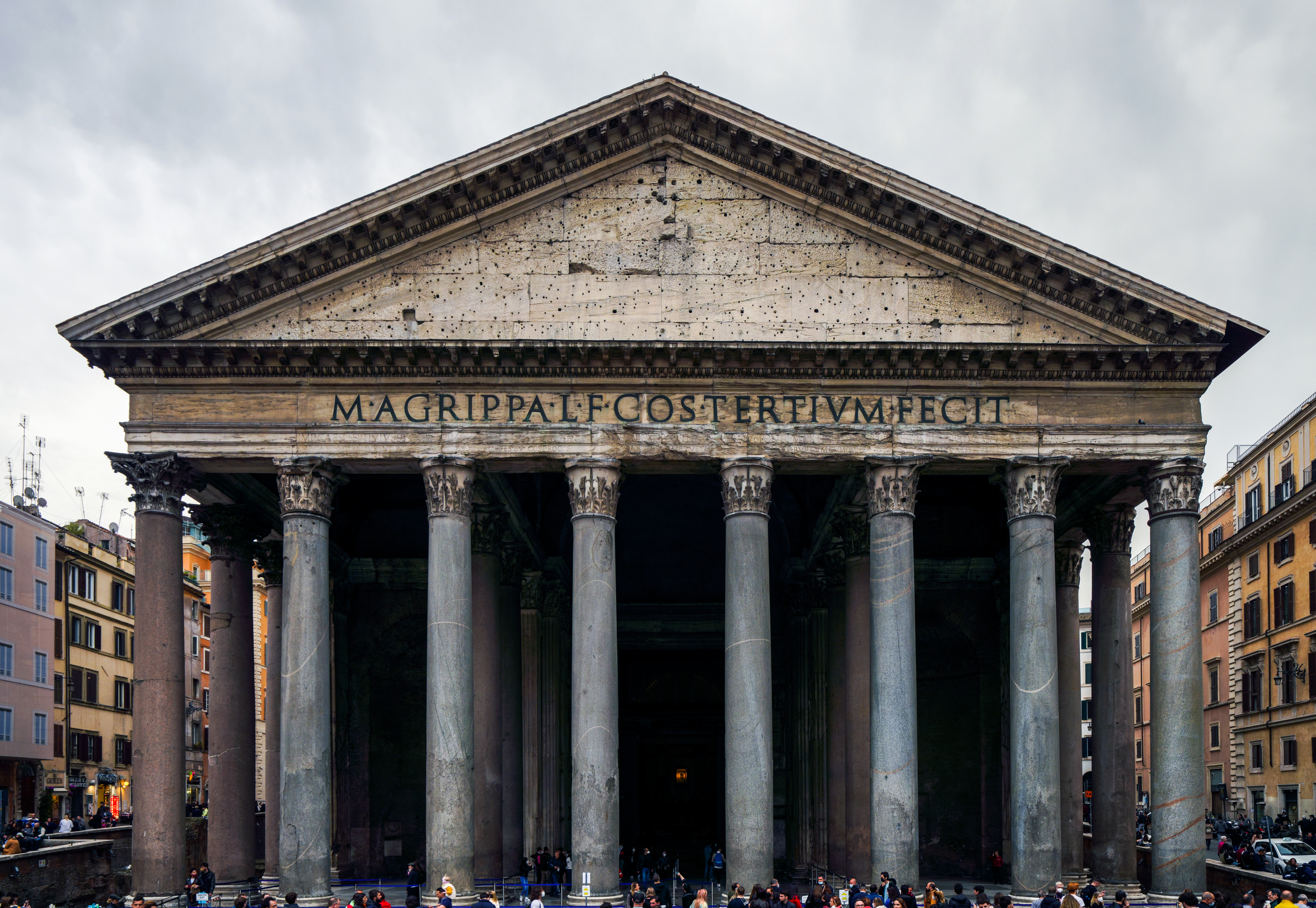
Ancient stamped concrete of the Pantheon in Rome

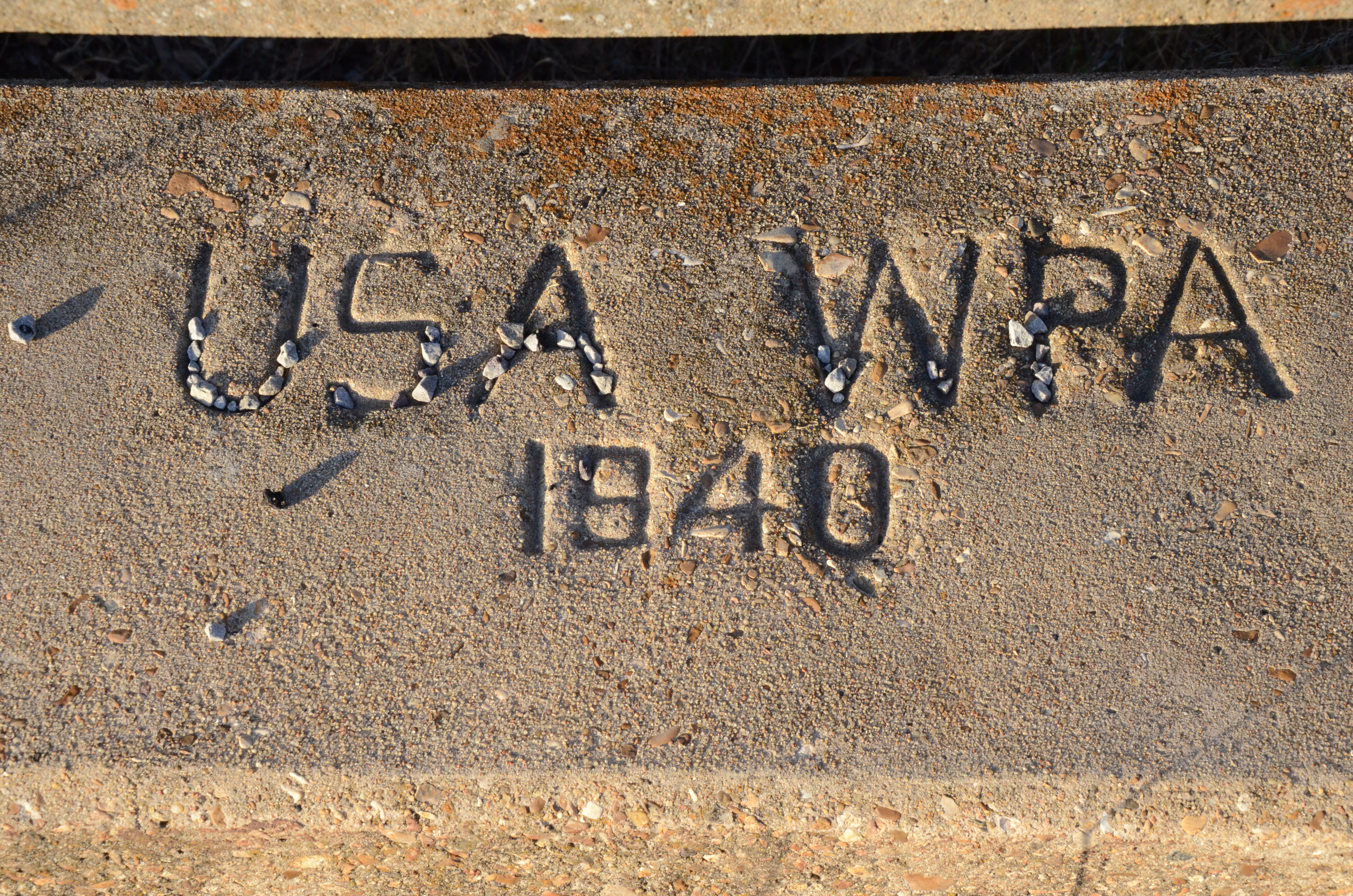
Concrete stamped as part of the Works Progress Administration building projects

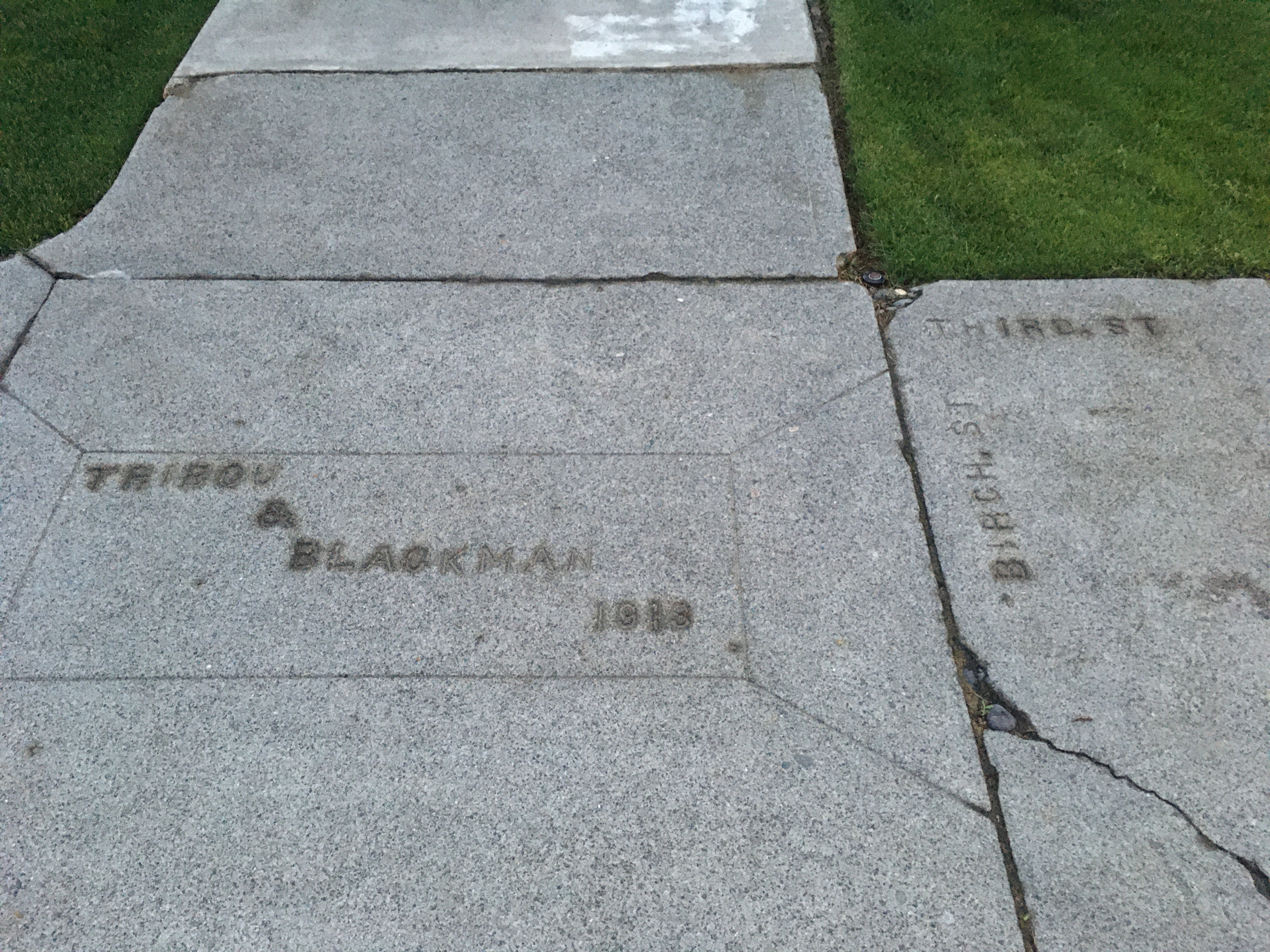
Tribou & Blackman Co. Concrete Stamp, 1913, Birch St. & 3rd St., Walla Walla, WA, USA

The ancient Romans used basic concrete stamping techniques, as evidenced in well-known structures such as the Pantheon. In the late nineteenth and early twentieth centuries, concrete companies who received government bids for public works projects sometimes used concrete stamps featuring the company name and sometimes the year in which the concrete was poured, creating a visible historical record of when certain sidewalks were made.

Concrete manufacturers started experimenting with modern decorative concrete techniques as early as the 1890s. In the 1950s, Brad Bowman—considered the "father" of modern concrete stamping—began developing and patenting new techniques for producing concrete that resembled non-concrete materials, such as flagstone and wood. He used wooden platform stamps that could imprint multiple pieces of concrete at once. Later, platform stamps would be made of sheet metal or aluminium. In 1956, Bill Stegmeier of the Stegmeier Company, discovered that a color powder used to impart an antiquing effect to concrete also had the property of preventing stamps from sticking to concrete, which opened up new possibilities. By the 1970s the demand for stamped concrete grew, and the material became a common component in building projects. In the late 1970s, manufacturer Jon Nasvik developed lightweight and durable urethane stamps for concrete. He later developed plastic stamps that could imprint both texture and pattern on wet concrete, making the process more efficient.

Modern stamped concrete increased in popularity in the 1970s in part because it was featured in the World of Concrete trade show. Builders saw it as a new way to satisfy the customer and make their budget work simultaneously. When stamped concrete for aesthetic purposes was first developed, there were very few choices of design and colors. However, as the industry grew more stamping patterns were created along with many different types of stains. Another advantage to using stamped concrete was that it could be applied to many different surfaces and textures, such as driveways, highways, patios, decks, and even floors inside the home.

In the twenty-first century, demand for stamped concrete in the non-residential construction industry has increased as part of a more general boom in demand for concrete products.

== Modern techniques ==
The ability of stamped concrete to resemble other building materials makes stamped concrete a less expensive alternative to using those other authentic materials such as stone, slate or brick. There are three procedures used in modern stamped concrete which distinguish it from other concrete procedures: the addition of a base color, the addition of an accent color, and stamping a pattern into the concrete. These three procedures provide stamped concrete with a color and shape similar to the natural building material. It also is longer-lasting than paved stone, and still resembles the look.

=== Adding base color ===
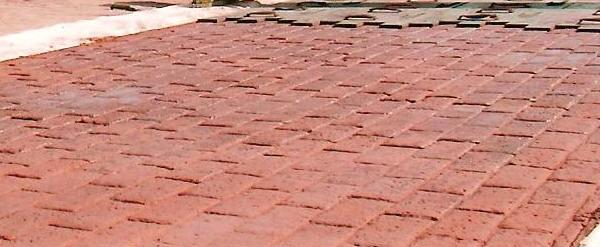
Modern brick-textured stamped concrete

The base color is the primary color used in stamped concrete. The base color is chosen to reflect the color of the natural building material. The base color is produced by adding a color hardener to the concrete. Color hardener is a powder pigment used to dye the concrete.

The color hardener can be applied using one of two procedures; integral color or cast-on color. Integral color is the procedure where the entire volume of concrete is dyed the base color. The entire volume of concrete is colored by adding the color hardener to the concrete truck, and allowing all the concrete in the truck to be dyed. Cast-on color is the procedure where the surface of the concrete is dyed the base color. The surface of the concrete is colored by spreading the color hardener onto the surface of the wet concrete and floating the powder into the top layer of the wet concrete.

Concrete can be colored in many ways; color hardener, integral liquid or powder, acid stains to name a few. The process of integrally coloring the concrete offers the advantage of the entire volume being colored; however, the surface strength is not increased as with the use of color hardener. Dry shake color hardener is another popular way to color concrete. You broadcast the hardener on the concrete as soon as it is floated for the first time. After letting the bleed water soak into the hardener you float and trowel it in. This method only covers the surface about 3/16 of an inch but it gives the concrete surface a longer wear life.

=== Adding accent color ===
The accent color is the secondary color used in stamped concrete. The secondary color is used to produce texture and show additional building materials (e.g. grout) in the stamped concrete. The accent color is produced by applying color release to the concrete. Color release has two purposes - 1) It is a pigment used to color the concrete and 2) It is a non-adhesive used to prevent the concrete stamps from sticking to the concrete.

The color release can be applied in one of two procedures based on the two forms it is manufactured in: powdered (cast-on color release made up of calcium-releasing powders that repel water); or liquid - which is a light aromatic-based solvent, spray-on color release. Cast-on color release is a procedure where the powder color release is applied by spreading the color release on the surface of the concrete before the concrete is stamped. Spray-on color release is a procedure where liquid color release is sprayed on the bottom of the concrete stamps before the concrete is stamped.

=== Stamping patterns ===
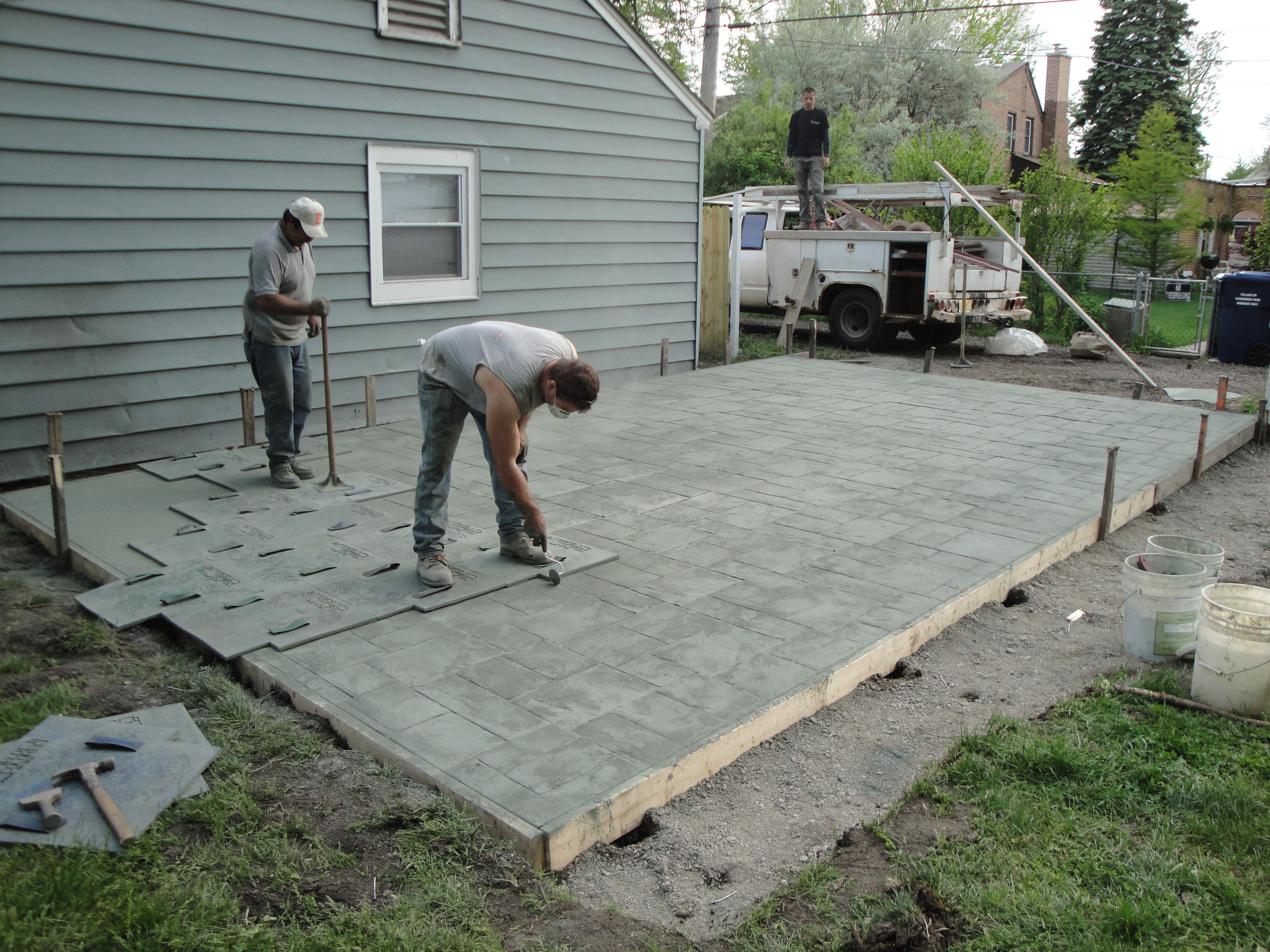
Concrete being stamped with an Ashlar Slate pattern

The pattern is the shape of the surface of the stamped concrete. The pattern reflects the shape of the natural building material. The pattern is made by imprinting the concrete shortly after it has been poured with a "concrete stamp". Most modern concrete stamps are made of polyurethane, but older "cookie cutter" style stamps were made of various metals. The old style stamps lacked the capabilities of forming natural stone texture.

Concrete stamping is the procedure which uses the concrete stamps to make the pattern in the stamped concrete. Concrete stamps are placed on the concrete after the color release has been applied. The concrete stamps are pushed into the concrete and then removed to leave the pattern in the stamped concrete.

In most cases concrete stamping is made to look like ordinary building products such as flagstone, brick, natural stone, etc.

== See also ==
- Brutalist architecture
- Concrete
- Decorative concrete
