= Med Ad News =

Pharmaceutical business magazine

- Editor: Daniel Becker
- Frequency: Bi-monthly
- Format: Print, online
- Publisher: Outcomes LLC (formerly Canon Communications)
- Founded: September 1982
- Country: United States
- Based in: Livingston, New Jersey
- Language: English
- Website: www.pharmalive.com

Med Ad News is a magazine, publishing pharmaceutical business and marketing news. It was started in 1982 and the first issue appeared in September 1982. Its headquarters is in Livingston, New Jersey, United States.

== Publishing ==
Med Ad News is currently published by Outcomes LLC, formerly by Canon Communications and Engel Publishing Partners.

The content of Med Ad News appears in print six times annually, distributed around the world and on PharmaLive.com.

== Acquisition ==
Engel Publishing Partners was sold to Canon Communications in 2007.

In January 2014, PharmaLive and Med Ad News brands were acquired by Outcomes LLC from UBM.

== See also ==
- HealthInvestor
