= The Bride Show =

Annual wedding event held in the UAE

- Status: Terminated
- Genre: Exhibition, Fashion show, Awards show & Trade show
- Venue: Abu Dhabi National Exhibition Centre & Dubai World Trade Centre
- Locations: Abu Dhabi & Dubai
- Country: United Arab Emirates
- Attendance: 35,000
- Organized by: Informa Connect
- Website: www.thebrideshow.com

The Bride Show is the leading annual wedding event in the Middle East, comprising The Bride Show Abu Dhabi and The Bride Show Dubai. More than 300 exhibitors participate in the show annually. The main exhibitors are fashion designers, hairstylists, cosmetologists and wedding planners. Other exhibitors are bridal fashion boutique, bakeries, banking, beauty, florists, fashion accessories, media, photographic studio, events & weddings management firms, gowns as well as wedding dress designers and skin care products. It was organised by Informa Middle East.

== The Bride Show Abu Dhabi ==
The Bride Show Abu Dhabi is a consumer event primarily for affluent Emirati women who are brides-to-be and their families, as well as Middle Eastern women; and fashionistas. In 2011, the Bride Show in Abu Dhabi attracted nearly 15,000 consumers. It was highly established as the largest female gathering in the Arab region, who are either planning their wedding or interested in beauty, fashion as well as lifestyle trends. It was held at Abu Dhabi National Exhibition Centre.

== The Bride Show Dubai ==
The Bride Show Dubai showcases from local bridal couture till international brands at its fashion show including events like marriage guidance, cooking shows and parlour treatments to go with the wedding theme. More than 20,000 visitors participated in the Bride Show Dubai. The show includes an exhibition of bridal accessories, jewellery, bridal gowns, groom's wear, hair care products, shoes, wedding stationery, bags, and magazines. It is held at the Dubai World Trade Centre.
