= WHX Dubai =

Global healthcare events, conference and exhibition in the Middle East

- Status: Active
- Genre: Healthcare
- Venue: Dubai Exhibition Centre, Expo City; Dubai World Trade Centre
- Location: Dubai
- Country: United Arab Emirates
- Inaugurated: 1975
- Most recent: February 2026
- Next event: January 25–28, 2027
- Attendance: 106,900 (2020)
- Organizer: Informa Markets
- Website: www.worldhealthexpo.com/events/healthcare/dubai/

The World Health Expo Dubai (formerly Arab Health) or more commonly known as just WHX Dubai, is a healthcare conference and trade show in the Middle East. The event takes place across the Dubai Exhibition Centre at Expo City and the Dubai World Trade Centre. It first took place in Dubai, United Arab Emirates, in 1975.

== Exhibition and congress ==
WHX Dubai is supported by the UAE Ministry of Health, the Abu Dhabi Health Authority, the Dubai Health Authority and the Dubai Healthcare City Authority.

== CME Accredited Conferences ==
Medical professionals can attend Continuing Medical Education (CME) accredited conferences, in the areas of Clinical Excellence & Surgical Innovation; General Surgery, Obstetrics and Gynaecology, Urology, Total Radiology, Quality Management and Patient safety, Public Health, and Healthcare Leadership.

== Conference ==
Dr Abdulsalam Al Taie speaking on mini gastric bypass at the Arab Health 2024 surgery conference

2024 Arab Health Surgery Conference: Dr Abdulsalam Al Taie speaking about Mini Gastric bypass surgery

== History ==
Year	Period	Venue
2019	28 - 31, Jan.	DWTC
2020	21 - 24, Jun.	DWTC
2021	21 - 24, Jun.	DWTC
2022	24 - 27 Jan.	DWTC
2023	Jan. 30 – Feb. 2	DWTC
2024	Jan. 29 – Feb. 1	DWTC
2025	Jan. 27 – 30	DWTC
2026	Feb. 09 – Feb. 12	DEC
2027	Jan. 25 – 28	DEC & DWTC

== See also ==
- Abu Dhabi Medical Congress
- Health in the United Arab Emirates
