= Calgary Expo =

Annual fan convention in Alberta, Canada

Calgary Comic and Entertainment Expo
- Status: Active
- Genre: Comic, pop culture
- Venue: Stampede Park
- Locations: Calgary, Alberta
- Country: Canada
- Inaugurated: 2005
- Attendance: 95,000 in 2017
- Organizer: Fan Expo HQ/Informa Connect
- Website: www.calgaryexpo.com

Calgary Expo, known in full as the Calgary Comic and Entertainment Expo, is an annual fan convention held at Stampede Park in Calgary, Alberta, Canada.

Originally taking place in the BMO Centre, the show began in 2005 as a comic book convention before moving on in 2009 to include actors from television shows and movies. The convention has since become the second largest convention in Canada. The convention became famous for having reunited the cast of Star Trek: The Next Generation for the show's 25th anniversary in 2012, and two years later, reuniting nearly the entire cast of Aliens (1986).

In 2017, Informa acquired the convention, placing it under its Fan Expo group.

== History ==
A smaller comic book convention had historically been held at McMahon Stadium's Red and White Club. The Calgary Comic & Entertainment Expo was first held in 2006 by Kandrix Foong, an aspiring comic book writer who pitched an event that would be more in line with larger events such as San Diego Comic-Con. The inaugural convention was hosted on a single floor of Stampede Park's Big Four Building, attracting an attendance of around 3,400.

By 2007, the event had become more established, attracting higher-profile guests and expanding into the BMO Centre. Eventually, the convention would use nearly all of Stampede Park, and would regularly attract around 100,000 attendees annually. By 2014, Calgary Expo was ranked as the second-largest fan convention in Canada, behind only Fan Expo Canada in Toronto.

In 2012, Calgary Expo organized a Star Trek: The Next Generation cast reunion for the series' 25th anniversary, resulting in a major increase in ticket sales. On the day of the panel, the venue exceeded its capacity, with an estimated attendance having been projected as 45,000. At 1:00 p.m. the Fire Marshall was called; it was deemed safe for 100 people to be admitted every 15 minutes. Many people were turned away and not let into the venue. Despite this, Expo staff had issued a statement claiming the convention was not oversold, and they hadn't been charged because no violations took place. A week later, the organizers issued a refund plan for people who were not admitted.

In 2016, the convention began to hold the Calgary Expo Holiday Market at BMO Centre, with a focus on vendors and gift shopping.

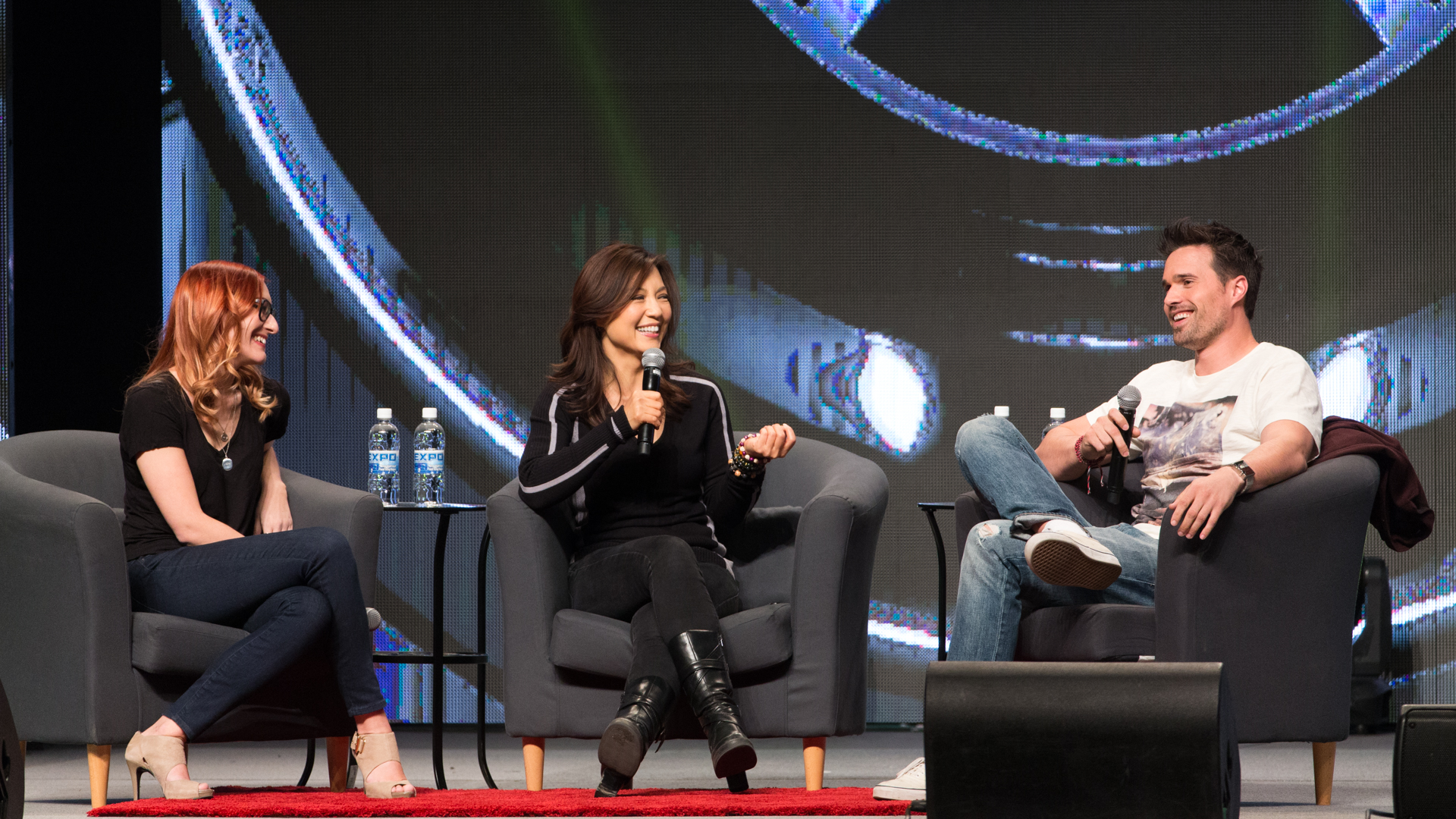
Ming-Na Wen and Brett Dalton at the 2015 Calgary Comic and Entertainment Expo

In October 2017, Calgary Expo was acquired by Informa, the current parent company of Fan Expo Canada. Foong would remain the producer of the event. In 2018, the first year under Informa ownership, Calgary Expo faced criticism for ending a long-standing policy that allowed wheelchair users free access to VIP lanes to receive priority access to celebrity autograph and photo opportunities. The organizers stated that the revised policies were intended to provide balanced access for all attendees, were part of a goal to provide an "equal and accessible" experience for all attendees (as the result of the change was to make all attendees require a VIP pass for such access, regardless of disability), and that they were in compliance with relevant legislation.

== Programming ==
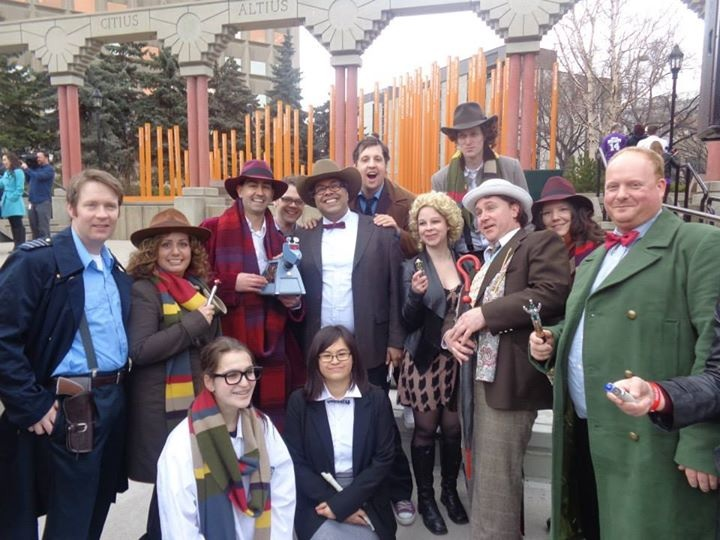
Doctor Who cosplayers pose with Calgary mayor Naheed Nenshi during the 2014 Calgary Expo opening ceremony

The convention offers an extensive range of panels that take place in locations throughout the park. In addition to the exhibitors' hall taking place in BMO halls A-C, and celebrity autograph sessions taking place in D and E, multiple conference rooms throughout the BMO such as the Palomino room host smaller panels. Bigger names will often also have their panels in the Stampede Corral, and some also taking place in the Boyce Theatre. In addition to the regular panels which last 45 minutes, 2012 and 2014 included special, extended panels often labeled as "EXPOsed", which typically last from an hour to two hours long. These have ranged from concert-type panels to discussion panels.

Since 2012, a parade through downtown Calgary known as the "Parade of Wonders" is held on the morning of the convention's opening day, which features cosplayers, marching bands, and appearances by some of the convention's guests. It traditionally finishes at Olympic Plaza; due to construction, the parade would end at BMO Centre itself on its 2025 route. The 2019 parade was noted as having around 5,000 public participants and nearly 15,000 spectators.

== Related events ==
In 2012, the Edmonton Comic and Entertainment Expo, an Edmonton-based spin-off of Calgary Expo, was first held at the Edmonton Expo Centre in Northlands. The inaugural edition hosted 15,000; by 2016, attendance had grown to 40,000. The 2017 edition featured an appearance by William Shatner and a concert by Gene Simmons of Kiss.

In 2014, the convention began an affiliation with the Saskatchewan Entertainment Expo in Saskatoon, Saskatchewan, first held in 2013, which was re-branded as the Saskatoon Comic and Entertainment Expo. The affiliation ended in 2018 following the sale to Informa.

In 2016, the convention began to hold the Calgary Expo Holiday Market at BMO Centre, with a focus on vendors and gift shopping.
