= InformationWeek =

American online magazine

- Screenshot of the website in December 2024
- VP, Editor In Chief: Rob Preston
- Categories: Technology B2B
- Frequency: Monthly
- Circulation: 220,000
- Founded: 1985
- Final issue: June 24, 2013 (print)
- Company: Informa TechTarget
- Country: United States
- Based in: San Francisco, California
- Website: www.informationweek.com
- ISSN: 8750-6874

InformationWeek is a digital magazine which conducts corresponding face-to-face events, virtual events, and research. It is headquartered in San Francisco, California and was first published in 1985 by CMP Media, later became part of Informa TechTarget. The print edition of the magazine has ceased, with the last issue published on June 24, 2013.

== History ==
The print edition began in 1985 using the name Information Week.

- April 1999 - Information Week began its 14th international edition: Brazil.
- May 1997 through 2000 – The worldwide regional publications of LAN Magazine were renamed to the already existing Network Magazine. Networkmagazine.com and lanmag.com now redirect to informationweek.com
- September 2005 – Network Magazine (networkmagazine.com) was renamed IT Architect (itarchitect.com). The offline publication was shut down after the March 2006 issue. itarchitect.com now redirects to InformationWeek.
- June 2006 – The company announced that offline publication of Network Computing would be merged with Information Week. Online, Network Computing (networkcomputing.com) would provide technical content, whereas informationweek.com would provide news. UBM renamed CMP Media to CMP Technology.
- 2008 – CMP Technology was restructured into four independent operating divisions under the common banner of UBM.
- 2013 – The printed Information Week magazine ceased publication. It had 220,000 print magazine subscribers (many of whom received free promotional subscriptions).
- 2018 – InformationWeek owner UBM (since 2008) merged with Informa.
- 2024 – Informa Tech's digital business merged with TechTarget, became Informa TechTarget which included InformationWeek.

== Mission ==
InformationWeek's stated mission is "To empower you with trustworthy information".The InformationWeek website features news, an array of proprietary InformationWeek research, analysis on IT trends, a whitepaper library, and editorial content.

InformationWeek Research identifies and interprets business technology trends and issues, producing more than 100 studies each year. Among its studies and reports are:

- The annual InformationWeek 500 (a listing of the nation's top users of information technology)
- The National IT Salary Survey (IT employee-based compensation and benefits study)
- The Global Information Security Study (6 languages, more than 15 countries participate)

InformationWeek runs events such as the InformationWeek 500 Conference & Gala Awards.

== The BrainYard ==
The BrainYard is a news and commentary website focused on social business produced by InformationWeek and the Enterprise 2.0 Conference. It covers the business uses of social media and collaboration technologies, including enterprise social networks for internal collaboration, social communities for customer support, and the sales, marketing, and customer support uses of public social networks such as Facebook and Twitter. The site also covers other enterprise collaboration technologies, such as videoconferencing and unified communications, particularly to the extent these are converging with social software.

The website was launched in April 2011. A year later, The BrainYard was named the winner of the min's Best of the Web Award for the best new business-to-business publication website.

== See also ==
- Omniture
