= Industry Dive =

Online business publication

- Company type: Subsidiary
- Industry: online B2B news source
- Founded: 2012; 14 years ago
- Founders: Sean Griffey; Eli Dickinson; Ryan Willumson
- Headquarters: Washington, D.C., United States
- Owner: Independent (2012–19); Falfurrias Capital Partners (2019–22); Informa plc (2022–present)
- Website: www.industrydive.com

Industry Dive is an American business-to-business news organization with an estimated 18 million readers in more than 25 industries, such as banking, marketing, medicine, retail, and waste management. Since 2022, it has been owned by Informa.

Industry Dive aims to serve business executives who read news digitally, reaching readers with newsletters and on their mobile phones. The company had an estimated revenue of more than of more than $110 million in 2023. As of 2022, it has about 380 employees, including more than 100 staff members working in editorial roles. Industry Drive's headquarters is in Washington, D.C.

== History ==
Industry Dive was formed in 2012 by Sean Griffey (president), Eli Dickinson (chief technology officer), and Ryan Willumson (chief revenue officer). It was funded with $900,000 from private investors in 2012 and 2013. The company covered five industries: construction, education, marketing, utility, and waste.

In 2016, Industry Dive began its Dive Awards. Industry Dive's revenues increased significantly from 2015 to 2018 due to larger digital readership, putting it in the top half of the Deloitte Technology Fast 500 and the top 20 percent of the Inc. Top 5000 list. In 2019, Falfurrias Capital Partners acquired a majority stake in the company. ID's content marketing clients included IBM, Siemens, and UPS. That same year, Griffey said “going small and deep” as opposed to scaling its audience made Industry Dive a profitable business model.

In 2020, DCA Live named Industry Dive to its "Red Hot Companies" list, which recognizes the D.C. area's 'fastest-growing' companies. In the same year, Industry Dive acquired CFO. In 2021, Industry Dive acquired PharmaVOICE.

In 2022, Industry Dive was purchased by Informa, which bought its majority stake from Falfurrias Capital Partners for about $525 million. Industry Dive had grown its business to over $100 million in annual revenue, and the deal valued the news organization at nearly $390 million.

== Publications ==
Industry Dive provides news coverage spanning dozens of industries, including agriculture, banking, construction, education, fashion, healthcare, and manufacturing, each using a different website:

- Agriculture Dive
- Automotive Dive
- Banking Dive
- BioPharma Dive
- CFO
- CFO Dive
- CIO Dive
- Construction Dive
- C-Store Dive
- Cybersecurity Dive
- Education Dive
- Facilities Dive
- Fashion Dive
- Food Dive
- Grocery Dive
- Healthcare Dive
- Higher Ed Dive
- Hotel Dive
- HR Dive
- K-12 Dive
- Legal Dive
- Manufacturing Dive
- Marketing Dive
- MedTech Dive
- Mobile Marketer
- Multifamily Dive
- Packaging Dive
- Payments Dive
- PharmaVoice
- Restaurant Dive
- Retail Dive
- Smart Cities Dive
- Social Media Today
- Supply Chain Dive
- Trucking Dive
- Utility Dive
- Waste Dive

== Awards ==
Industry Dive publications have received several national and regional Awards of Excellence from the American Society of Business Publication Editors, including for a series of 2020 articles about the U.S. pharmaceutical industry and the race for the coronavirus vaccine.

The Washington Post recognized Industry Dive as a top place to work for four consecutive years, from 2016 to 2020.

== See also ==
- Digital journalism
- Online journalism
