= UBM Canon =

American business-to-business media company

UBM Canon (formerly Canon Communications), founded in 1978, was a diversified business-to-business media company which is now part of Informa that publishes and produces 13 magazines, 54 trade shows & events and 21 web sites.

In April 2005, Apprise Media, a niche media company backed by Spectrum Equity Investors bought Canon from Veronis Suhler Stevenson for $200 million. In September 2010, Canon announced that it had agreed to be acquired by United Business Media and the deal was completed in October 2010 at which point the company was renamed UBM Canon.

UBM Canon has purchased several tradeshows and publication groups over the past several years including Engel Publishing's Med Ad News from Euromoney Institutional Investor and Powder Bulk Solids magazine and tradeshows from Reed Business Information in May 2006 In 2010, Canon bought four more RBI titles: EDN, Design News, Test & Measurement World and Packaging Digest.
