= 2015 Major League Quidditch season =

2015 MLQ season
- League: Major League Quidditch
- Sport: Quidditch
- Duration: June 1 – August 23, 2015
- Games: 9
- Teams: 8

Regular season
- Season champions: East: Boston Night Riders; North: Indianapolis Intensity
- Season MVP: East: Max Havlin (BOS); North: Tyler Walker (IND)

MLQ Championship
- Champions: Boston Night Riders
- Runners-up: New York Titans

MLQ seasons
- 2016 →

The 2015 Major League Quidditch season was the league's first, and was contested by eight teams over the course of the 2015 summer. The eight teams were split into two divisions, with the North Division composed of the Cleveland Riff, Detroit Innovators, Indianapolis Intensity and Rochester Whiteout and the East Division composed of the Boston Night Riders, New York Titans, Ottawa Black Bears and Washington Admirals.

During the regular season, each team played a set of three matches against every other team in their division, comprising a total of nine matches. Based on the results of those nine matches, the teams were seeded for the MLQ Championship, which all eight qualified for. The championship was decided with two rounds of single-elimination matches before a best two-out-of-three championship series.

The Boston Night Riders won the 2015 MLQ Championship, played at the Monsignor Schmidt CYO Athletic Complex in Toledo, Ohio, ending the season with a perfect 13–0 record. They defeated the New York Titans 2–0 in the finals, but the matches were the only two that Boston played in snitch range for the entire season. By winning the title, Boston was awarded the Benepe Cup, named in honor of Alex Benepe, the co-founder of the sport.

== Regular season ==
Teams of the 2015 Major League Quidditch season

=== Standings ===
Team	W	L	QPD/G	SWIM
East Division
(Massachusetts) Boston Night Riders	9	0	+101.1	0-0
(New York (state)) New York Titans	5	4	+18.9	0–1
(Washington, D.C.) Washington Admirals	3	6	−36.4	3–1
(Canada) Ottawa Black Bears	1	8	−68.9	1–2
North Division
(Indiana) Indianapolis Intensity	6	3	−2.2	5–0
(Ohio) Cleveland Riff	5	4	−8.8	4–3
(New York (state)) Rochester Whiteout	5	4	+27.7	1–4
(Michigan) Detroit Innovators	2	7	−15.6	2–5

(Cleveland finished ahead of Rochester by virtue of head-to-head tiebreaker)

== Championship ==
Quarterfinals
E1	Boston Night Riders	140*
N4	Detroit Innovators	30
N2	Cleveland Riff	130
E3	Washington Admirals	120*
E2	New York Titans	150*
N3	Rochester Whiteout	80
N1	Indianapolis Intensity	130*
E4	Ottawa Black Bears	100

Semifinals
E1	Boston Night Riders	180*
N2	Cleveland Riff	60
E2	New York Titans	150*
N1	Indianapolis Intensity	60

Championship
E1	Boston Night Riders	140*	120*
E2	New York Titans	90	90
