= Fan Expo =

Brand of fan conventions operated by Informa

- Type: Division
- Industry: Fan conventions
- Headquarters: Toronto, Canada
- Area served: Canada, United States
- Owner: Informa Connect
- Parent: Informa plc
- Website: fanexpohq.com

Fan Expo is a group of fan conventions operated by Fan Expo HQ, a unit of the Informa Connect division of Informa plc. Most of its events are run under the Fan Expo brand, which stems from its namesake, the Toronto-based Fan Expo Canada.

The division was formed in 2013 after Informa's acquisition of Fan Expo Canada from Hobby Star Marketing. It has since acquired other conventions in Canada and the United States, including Boston Comic Con, the Calgary Comic and Entertainment Expo (CCEE), Denver Pop Culture Con, MegaCon, Wizard World, and VidCon; most of these events were brought under the Fan Expo banner following their sales.

== History ==
In 2013, Informa announced its acquisition of Hobby Star Marketing, organizer of Fan Expo Canada—a Canadian comic and entertainment convention held annually at the Metro Toronto Convention Centre. In 2014, Informa acquired the Dallas Comic Con. In 2015, Informa acquired MegaCon in Orlando.

In August 2016, Informa acquired Boston Comic Con, which was rebranded as Fan Expo Boston in 2018. In October 2017, Informa acquired the Calgary Comic and Entertainment Expo and Edmonton Comic and Entertainment Expo. In March 2021, Informa acquired Denver Pop Culture Con, which was rebranded as Fan Expo Denver.

In August 2021, Informa acquired Wizard Entertainment's conventions; all of its remaining events were cancelled, barring Wizard World Chicago (which was held in October as the final Wizard World-branded event). All six of its conventions in Chicago, Cleveland, New Orleans, St. Louis, Philadelphia, and Portland were rebranded as Fan Expo beginning in 2022.

In August 2024, Informa acquired VidCon from Paramount Global, with the convention held under the Fan Expo HQ unit.

In March 2026, Fan Expo HQ announced it would launch its first branded convention in Anaheim, titled Fan Expo Anaheim: Special Edition, in June with Mark Hamill as the headlining guest.

== Events ==
Events held as part of the Fan Expo family include:

- Calgary Comic and Entertainment Expo
- Edmonton Comic and Entertainment Expo
- Fan Expo Boston
- Fan Expo Canada (Toronto, flagship convention)
  - Toronto Comicon
- Fan Expo Chicago
- Fan Expo Cleveland
- Fan Expo Dallas
  - Dallas Fan Festival
- Fan Expo Denver
- Fan Expo New Orleans
- Fan Expo Philadelphia
- Fan Expo Portland
- Fan Expo Vancouver
- MegaCon (Orlando, largest event)
- VidCon
  - Fan Expo Anaheim

=== Former events ===
- Fan Expo Regina
- Fan Expo St. Louis
- Fan Expo San Francisco
- MegaCon Tampa Bay
