= BMO Centre =

Convention centre in Calgary, Alberta, Canada

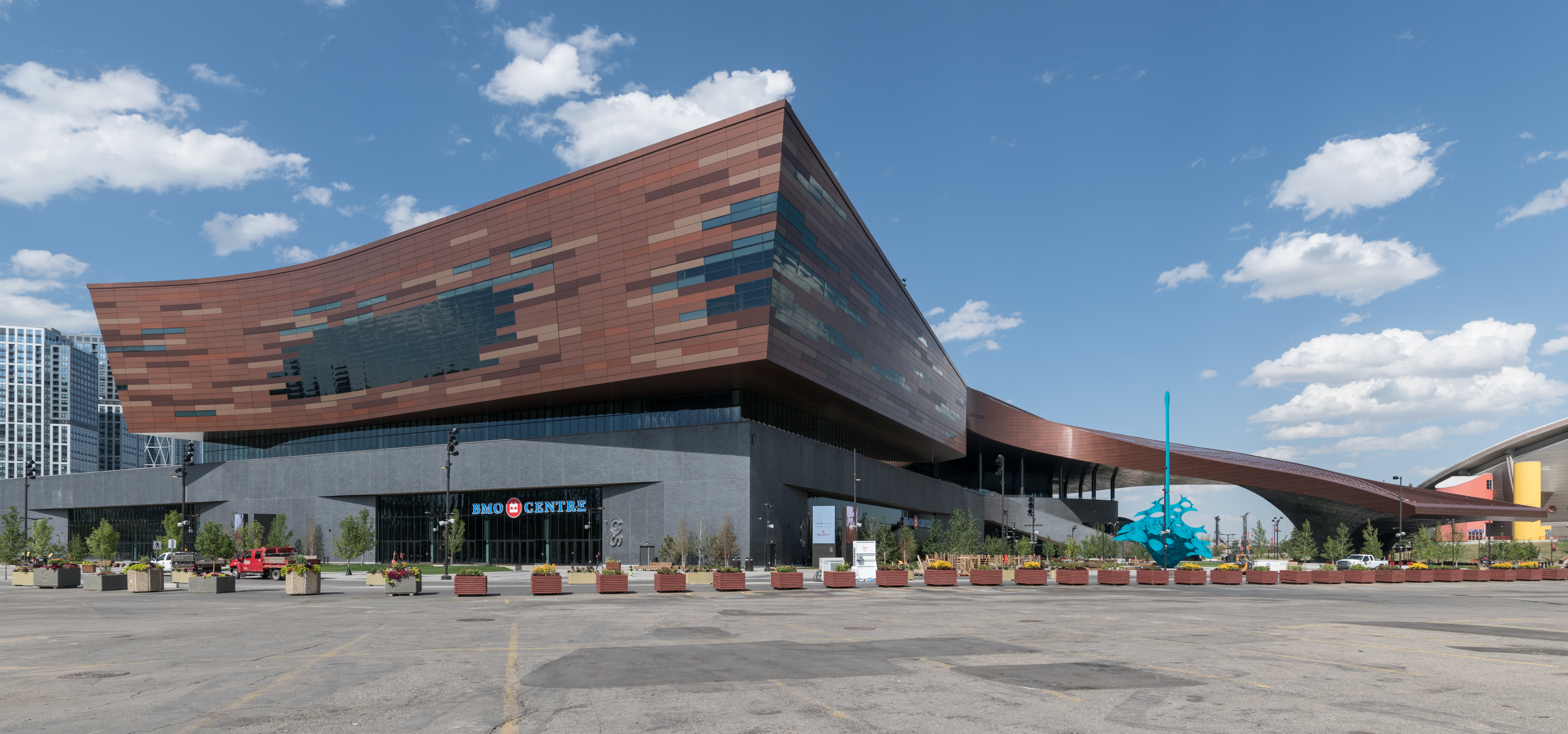
- BMO Centre in 2024 following its major expansion
- Interactive map of BMO Centre
- Former names: Round-up Centre
- Address: 1912 Flores Ladue Parade SE
- Location: Calgary, Alberta, Canada
- Coordinates: 51.0385°N 114.0569°W
- Operator: Calgary Stampede Sales and Event Management
- Public transit: Victoria Park/Stampede

Construction
- Built: 1979–1981
- Opened: 1981
- Renovated: 2000. 2009, 2024
- Expanded: 2000; 2009; 2024
- Cost: $21 million (CAD)

Website
- venues.calgarystampede.com/bmo-centre

The BMO Centre is a convention centre in Calgary, Alberta, Canada. It is located in Stampede Park, which is in the Beltline community south of downtown Calgary. It serves as Calgary’s main venue for major conventions, exhibitions, and trade shows. With more than 1,000,000 sq ft (93,000 m^{2}) of total event space, it is the largest convention facility in Western Canada and the only Tier 1 convention centre in Calgary, capable of hosting international-scale conferences and large-format events. The facility is operated by the Calgary Stampede Sales and Event Management division and forms part of the broader redevelopment of Stampede Park.

== History ==
The origins of the BMO Centre are closely tied to the Calgary Stampede. The Stampede organization initiated plans in the late 1970s for a modern, year-round exhibition and trade facility to complement the agricultural and cultural programming of its annual fair. Construction of the original building, then known as the Round-up Centre, began in 1979 and was completed in 1981 at a cost of approximately $21 million (CAD). It became a cornerstone for Calgary’s convention and exhibition industry, hosting agricultural shows, consumer expos, and major corporate events.

The centre was renamed the BMO Centre in 2007 following a sponsorship agreement with the Bank of Montreal. Subsequent expansions in 2000 and 2009 added new exhibit halls, a ballroom, and several meeting rooms to accommodate growing event demand.

In March 2016, the Calgary Stampede organization announced plans to demolish the adjacent Stampede Corral to make way for a major expansion of the BMO Centre. Construction on the $500 million project began in April 2021, led by the Calgary Municipal Land Corporation (CMLC) in partnership with the Calgary Stampede and the City of Calgary. The expansion, designed by Stantec, Populous, and S2 Architecture, officially opened on June 5, 2024, marking the completion of a 565,000 sq ft (52,500 m^{2}) addition that positioned the BMO Centre among the top-tier convention venues in Canada.

== Facilities ==
Following the 2024 expansion the facility offers:

- Approx. 1,000,000 sq ft of total floor area, with roughly 500,000 sq ft rentable for events and the rest pre-function / support space.
- Seven contiguous exhibit halls totaling approximately 350,000 sq ft (five ~50,000 sq ft each, one ~60,000 sq ft, one ~40,000 sq ft).
- Three major ballrooms: Champions (~50,000 sq ft), Percheron (~20,000 sq ft), Palomino (~12,000 sq ft).
- A central gathering space named The Exchange, featuring 21-metre tall indoor fireplace believed to be Canada’s largest, designed to evoke the atmosphere of gathering round a campfire.
- An outdoor plaza of nearly 100,000 sq ft on the southern side of the building, integrated with public art installations and designed for event overflow and outdoor receptions.
- The venue’s interior contains more than 85 public art pieces curated across the expansion, including a 70-foot-tall sculpture titled Spirit of Water by artist Gerry Judah weighing 112,000 lbs and located in the outdoor plaza.

== Major events ==
Large recurring or headline events at the BMO Centre include:

- The Calgary Stampede (July each year) uses the BMO Centre for indoor exhibits, markets, seminar spaces and part of its massive fairground operation.
- Global Energy Show Canada at Stampede Park and the BMO Centre, drawing more than 30,000 attendees.
- Calgary Expo (Calgary Comic and Entertainment Expo) held in Stampede Park with the BMO Centre as the primary indoor venue.
- Calgary Home + Garden Show produced by Marketplace Events, staged annually at the BMO Centre.
- Wine and beverage festivals including Winefest and Grape Escape, which program halls within the BMO Centre.
- The Conservative Party of Canada 2026 Convention on January 29 to 31.

== Architecture and design ==
The design integrates references to Calgary’s prairie, foothills and river valley landscapes. Materials such as blackened steel, copper accents and expansive glazing are used throughout. Notable design highlights include:

- Canada’s largest indoor fireplace (21 metres tall) anchoring The Exchange gathering space.
- The exterior and plaza include the “Spirit of Water” sculpture by Gerry Judah, together with over 85 public art installations throughout the complex.
- The stacked spatial concept enables seamless movement between exhibit halls, ballrooms and meeting rooms.

== Redevelopment and economic impact ==
The expansion established the BMO Centre as a Tier 1 international convention venue capable of hosting more than 30,000 delegates. Economic impact reports from the City of Calgary and CMLC estimate over $100 million in annual local economic benefit from tourism and business travel linked to events at the facility.

== See also ==
- List of attractions and landmarks in Calgary
- Trade fair
- Stampede Park
