= Magic (trade show) =

MAGIC is a fashion tradeshow in the United States. Held twice a year (February and August) in Las Vegas, this fashion marketplace showcases men's, women's and children's apparel, footwear, and accessories.

== History ==
The tradeshow was inaugurated in 1933 by the Men's Apparel Guild in California. At one time it featured only men's clothing and accessories, but has expanded to include ladies' clothing and accessories, and manufacturing services. In 1989 it moved to Las Vegas.

In 1998, Magic was acquired by Advanstar Communications. In 2014, Advanstar was acquired by UBM plc.
