= Dr. Abdulsalam Al Taie =

Abdulsalam Al Taie
- Born: Iraq
- Known for: Bariatric and laparoscopic surgery in the United Arab Emirates
- Medical career
- Profession: Consultant General, Laparoscopic & Bariatric Surgery
- Field: Bariatric surgery
- Institutions: Al Taie Center For Laparoscopic & Obesity Surgery
- Notable works: Bariatric surgery practice and minimally invasive surgical procedures in the UAE
- Website: https://drabdulsalamaltaie.ae/

Dr. Abdulsalam Al Taie is an Iraqi-born bariatric, laparoscopic and general surgeon based in the United Arab Emirates. He is the founder and medical director of the Al Taie Center for Laparoscopic and Obesity Surgery, which operates in Dubai and Abu Dhabi.

He has practiced bariatric and minimally invasive surgery in Iraq, the United Kingdom and the United Arab Emirates. His clinical work has focused on the surgical treatment of obesity and metabolic disorders using laparoscopic techniques.

== Education ==
Al Taie graduated in medicine in Iraq in 1982. He subsequently completed postgraduate surgical training in the United Kingdom and became a Fellow of the Royal College of Surgeons of Edinburgh (FRCS). He also received additional training in bariatric and laparoscopic surgery in the United Kingdom, Germany and Austria.

== Career and milestones (UAE experience) ==
Following graduation, Al Taie practiced surgery in Iraq before relocating to the United Kingdom, where he worked at several teaching hospitals including Hope Hospital, Withington Hospital, Tameside General Hospital and Alexandra Hospital.

Between 1995 and 2003, he served as a consultant laparoscopic surgeon in Iraq and participated in the training of surgeons in minimally invasive surgical techniques.

In 2003, Al Taie moved to the United Arab Emirates and established a specialist practice in bariatric and laparoscopic surgery. He later founded the Al Taie Center for Laparoscopic and Obesity Surgery, with facilities in Dubai and Abu Dhabi.

- 75,000+ Bariatric Procedures: He has performed over 75,000 bariatric procedures throughout his career.
- Consultant Surgeon in Iraq 1995 - 2003): Served as a Leading consultant Laparoscopic and Bariatric Surgeon in Iraq between 1995 and 2003 prior to relocating to the UAE
- First Procedures in the UAE (2003): Performed the UAE;s first Laparoscopic Sleeve Gastrectomy and fist Roux-en-Y Gastric Bypass in 2003
- First Dedicated Department (2003): Established Abu Dhabi's first dedicated Bariatric Surgery Department in 2003
- Obesity Surgery Conference (2006): Organized/launched the UAE's first Obesity Surgery Conference in 2006
- Center of Excellence (2018): Al Taie Center was recognized as the UAE's first center of Excellence for Bariatric and Metabolic Diseases in 2018.

== Clinical practice ==
Al Taie's practice includes bariatric surgery, laparoscopic surgery and general surgery. His clinical work includes laparoscopic sleeve gastrectomy, Roux-en-Y gastric bypass, revisional bariatric surgery and other minimally invasive gastrointestinal procedures.
