= World of Concrete =

Construction trade show in Las Vegas, Nevada

World of Concrete logo in use since 2014

The World of Concrete is an annual trade show for the commercial construction industry. It is held each year either in the months of January or February for four days in Las Vegas, Nevada. This event is a show where products, resources, and information related to concrete construction are shared and displayed. More than 1,800 companies and suppliers from all over the world come together in the 900,000-square-foot (84,000 m^{2}) Las Vegas Convention Center to show, demonstrate, do business, and answer questions about what they are showing.

Besides the vendors, there are demonstrations and seminars. The demonstrations are actual work site conditions where attendees can see the product that they are interested in put to the test. Seminars are held throughout the event. There are 90-minute or three-hour sessions to choose from. Some of the seminars are also certification programs where attendees can be certified in different targeted fields. Some examples of seminar topics include concrete production, concrete technology, and leadership & management.

Habitual attendees include commercial contractors, concrete contractors, ready mix producers, rental center managers, and concrete pumpers.

Informa Exhibitions acquired the conference from Hanley Wood in 2014.

World of Concrete is featured in the 2026 documentary film The History of Concrete.

== World of Concrete India ==
The 4th edition of World of Concrete India was open from August 10–12, 2017 in New Delhi
