= Game Developer (website) =

Video game developer website

- Screenshot of the website in December 2024
- Website type: News and information for video game developers
- Owner: Informa TechTarget
- Editor: Danielle Riendeau
- Website: gamedeveloper.com
- Launched: 1997; 29 years ago

Game Developer (known as Gamasutra until 2021) is a website created in 1997 that focuses on aspects of video game development. It is owned and operated by Informa TechTarget and acted as the online sister publication to the print magazine Game Developer prior to the latter's closure in 2013.

== Site sections ==
Game Developer publishes daily news, features like post-game post-mortems and critical essays from developers, and user-submitted blog posts. The articles can be filtered by topic (All, Console/PC, Social/Online, Smartphone/Tablet, Independent, Serious) and category (Programming, Art, Audio, Design, Production, Biz (Business)/Marketing). The site has an online storefront for books on game design, RSS feeds and the website's Twitter account.

The site also has a section for users to apply for contracted work and open positions at various development studios.

=== Trade Center Resource ===
While it does post news found on typical video game websites, Game Developer provides articles for professional game developers on the disciplines of design, audio, public relations, and art. The site encourages professionals to publish blogs in order to share their expertise with other developers. The editorial staff also takes part in conducting interviews with developers and hardware designers, such as Dragon Quest creator Yuji Horii, Nintendo 3DS designer Hideki Konno, and Portal writer Erik Wolpaw.

=== Post-mortems ===
Project post-mortems, articles in which developers recount the successful and unsuccessful elements of a specific game's development, provide direct insight in all aspects of game design and educate other developers on various risks and important tips. Many post-mortems have been published, ranging from independent games such as Okabu and The Path to major studio projects such as Ōkamiden and BioShock. There are currently over 150 collected post-mortems dating back as far as 1997. There have been unusual post-mortem articles published, including "A Story of GameLayers, Inc." that reveals the tumultuous development and eventual cancellation of a Firefox toolbar-based MMORPG, and "What Went Wrong? Learning from Past Post-Mortems" that details the most common mistakes that developers make as admitted in the articles.

=== Guidelines ===
Game Developer offers the opportunity for users to publish blog articles on their website. To ensure a high standard of quality, interested authors are required to collaborate with their editorial team. Contributors retain the rights to their content after publishing it with Game Developer.

Users are also allowed to comment on articles, but there is a strict set of rules. Comment guidelines are designed to keep user discussions of a given article on the topic and prevent comments from devolving into flame wars (hostile interactions on the Internet), as seen on other community-driven websites where comment regulations are looser. Users are encouraged to post only constructive thoughts that add to the conversation.

== GameSetWatch ==
GameSetWatch is an alternative video game weblog and sister site of Game Developer. It is dedicated to collecting curious links and media for offbeat and often ignored games from old and new consoles, as well as digital downloads such as iOS, and indie spaces.

GameSetWatch was founded by publisher and editorial director Simon Carless in November 2005. It was up and running for six years until its semi-permanent hiatus in November 2011. The site stopped as the creators saw an overlap of content with their sister site IndieGames.com and because they felt the mainstream gaming blogs were covering more of the "weirder" and alternative video game news.

Those that contributed to the launch included IGF chairman Brandon Boyer, GameTrailers stalwart Michael McWhertor, Game Developer news director Frank Cifaldi, Alice Taylor, as well as Game Developer magazine EIC Brandon Sheffield.

== IndieGames.com ==
IndieGames.com started in October 2005. IndieGames.com is Game Developer's sister site dedicated to reporting on indie games. It became the UBM TechWeb's main method to deliver news about independent games after GameSetWatch closed. In September 2018, IndieGames.com split from its longtime owner UBM. The writers started a new independently ran website called Indie Games Plus and carried over the older IndieGames.com posts to the new website.

=== Interviews ===
The interviews section of the site features interviews with indie game creators and developers. The interviewees answer a set of questions posed by the interviewer including questions regarding their inspirations and hardships. The page is also split into three categories: desktop, console, and mobile to organize the interviews by platform interests.

=== Features ===
The features section of the site consists of posts by the writers and editors of the site. Articles are written on any topic in the indie game sector. It was announced in September 2014 that there would be a collaboration with the Games We Care About Twitter page to help gamers discover alternative games recommended by developers and peers.

There also is a Best of Features page that highlights some of the more notable freeware and indie games of current and previous years.

=== Reviews ===
The Reviews section of the site is written by Michael Rose starting in February 2009. It features reviews on the games mentioned in the "Best of Features" page to give readers a look into the game before playing it themselves.

== Awards ==
As Gamasutra, the site and its team of editors won a Webby Award in 2006 and 2007; their five-word acceptance speeches were "Heart plus science equals games" and "Art plus science, still games", respectively.

== See also ==
- Game Developers Choice Awards
