= UBM plc =

UK-based media company

- Type: Public
- ISIN: JE00BD9WR069
- Industry: Media
- Founded: 1918; 108 years ago
- Founder: David Lloyd George
- Defunct: 2018; 8 years ago
- Fate: Acquired by Informa
- Headquarters: London, England, UK
- Key people: Greg Lock (acting chairman); Tim Cobbold (CEO)
- Products: Exhibitions; Marketing services
- Revenue: £1,002.9 million (2017)
- Operating income: £229.1 million (2017)
- Net income: £151.7 million (2017)
- Number of employees: 3,891 (2017)
- Website: www.ubm.com

UBM plc was a British business-to-business (B2B) events organiser headquartered in London, England, before its acquisition by Informa in 2018. It had a long history as a multinational media company. Its main focus was on B2B events, but its operations included live media and business-to-business communications, marketing services and data provision, and it principally served the technology, healthcare, trade and transport, ingredients and fashion industries. UBM was listed on the London Stock Exchange and was a constituent of the FTSE 250 Index.

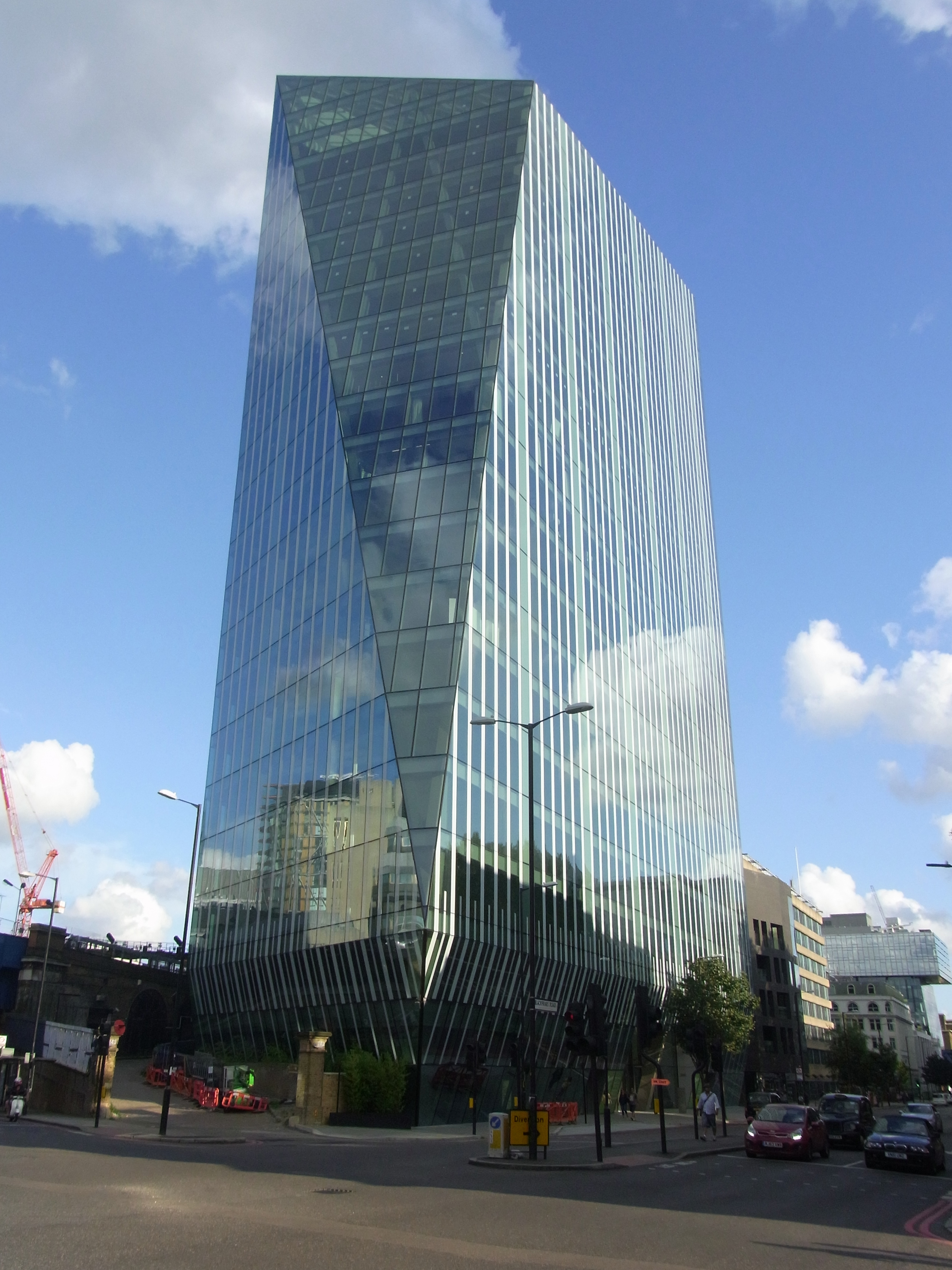
UBM's head office in Blackfriars Road, London

== History ==
=== Newspaper interests ===
The history of the companies that made up UBM stretches back almost two hundred years. Up until its acquisition UBM businesses published many titles that were launched in the 19th century, including Building magazine, launched in 1843 by Joseph Hansom, as well as Chemist & Druggist.

The company was founded in 1918 as United Newspapers by David Lloyd George to acquire the Daily Chronicle and Lloyd's Weekly Newspaper. In 1929, the company merged with Provincial Newspapers, an owner of regional papers in the north; the next year, it sold its national papers. The company continued for decades as a regional newspaper publisher, making acquisitions such as Yorkshire Post Newspapers in 1969.

It acquired PR Newswire in 1982. In 1985, it bought Express Newspapers and continued to publish the Daily Express for some 15 years. Also in 1985, it bought US trade magazine and book publisher Miller Freeman. It changed its name to United News & Media in 1995, sold its regional papers in 1998, and bought CMP Media, a technology-focused trade media company, in 1999 for $920 million. In 2000, it sold the Daily Express to Richard Desmond, sold most of Miller Freeman to VNU and Reed Elsevier and adopted the name of United Business Media. United Business Media acquired the trade publisher Aprovia UK (owner of The Builder) in 2003 and the medical publishing company MediMedia in 2004.

=== Television interests ===
MAI was part of a consortium that bid for the ITV south and south east area, which formed Meridian Broadcasting in 1991. MAI began to expand following the successful launch of Meridian: in 1994 the company bought Anglia Television, the ITV franchise for the east of England, and the following year became a major shareholder in the consortium that won the franchise for Channel 5. In 1996, MAI merged with United Newspapers (via an agreed takeover by United) to form United News & Media (UNM). The resulting company owned the Daily Express newspaper, Meridian, Anglia, and a large shareholding (through the Yorkshire Post) in Yorkshire Tyne Tees Television, the owners of Yorkshire Television and Tyne Tees Television. The stake in Yorkshire Tyne Tees Television was sold to Granada, allowing them to take control of the two franchises in 1997. In November 1997 UBM also launched the now defunct satellite TV Channel Rapture TV which focussed on dance music and extreme sports. The channel was put up for sale in 2001, and was eventually brought by Edinburgh-based company Power TV a year later, in April 2002.

United News and Media later agreed to buy Scottish Television's 20% stake in HTV and on 28 June 1997, HTV was taken over fully by UNM for £370 million.

In 1999, plans emerged of a merger between UNM and rival Carlton, however these talks failed when it appeared that Meridian would have to be sold off as a condition of the deal. As a result, the television assets of UNM were sold to Granada, however due to regulations stating that the company could not control that large an audience share, the broadcasting arm of HTV was sold to Carlton in exchange for Central's 20% stake in Meridian.

=== Reorganisation since 2005 ===
In 2005 UBM re-focused on two principal businesses: PR Newswire, a global news distribution business; and CMP, an international events, print and online publishing business. It disposed of NOP which was acquired by GfK for £383 million in 2005. In September 2006, NewBay Media acquired CMP Entertainment Media from United Business Media. The trade book operations of CMP were sold to Elsevier and Hal Leonard. It went on to acquire Commonwealth Business Media for $152 million in 2006. On 1 July 2008, as part of a reorganisation of the corporate structure of the Group, United Business Media Limited (UBML) was created as a new holding company and parent company of the Group. UBML is UK-listed and incorporated in Jersey. In 2010 the principal holding company of the United Business Media group (the "Group") was organised into five operating segments: Events, TD & M, Data Services, Online and Print.

In 2008, UBM moved its tax headquarters to Ireland, but in 2012, the company announced its intent to move its tax base back to the United Kingdom.

In September 2010, Canon Communications announced that it had agreed to be acquired by UBM. In May 2011, United Business Media officially changed its name to UBM plc. In February 2012 Yankee Group sold its annual 4G World telecoms and wireless trade show to UBM plc where it was incorporated into its UBM Tech division.

Briefing Media acquired UBM plc's UK agriculture and medical general practitioner portfolios for £10 million in February 2012 while UBM plc announced the acquisition of four trade shows in Asia for 19.4 million in the same month, marking UBM plc's continuing transformation into an events and B2B marketing services company. In 2012, PA Group, the parent company of the Press Association, sold its 50% stake in Canada Newswire to joint venture partner UBM for £30.1 million. In April 2013, UBM's data services businesses were sold to Electra Partners.

In October 2014, UBM announced it would acquire Advanstar Communications for a fee of $972 million. In November 2014 UBM plc CEO, Tim Cobbold, announced a new Events First strategy By 2015, UBM had rebranded itself as primarily focused on B2B events. Reflecting this, 82 percent of its business in 2016 derived from events and only 18 percent from other marketing services. In December 2015, UBM announced the sale of PR Newswire to Cision for $841 million, subject to regulatory approval. UBM had owned the company since 1982. Some analysts interpreted this as a further step in the transition from a diverse media company to a B2B events company. In June 2016 UBM plc announced the completion of the sale of PR Newswire to Cision. In the same month UBM reached agreement to divest its electronics media portfolio to an affiliate of Arrow Electronics Inc. for a cash consideration of $23.5m. The portfolio comprised the US and Asian versions of EE Times, EDN, ESM, Embedded, EBN, TechOnline and Datasheets.com.

In January 2018 Informa announced the acquisition of the company for £4 billion. The transaction was completed in June 2018. In January 2019, Informa sold several of the UBM Life Sciences publications (including Spectroscopy and Psychiatric Times) to MJH Associates.

== Operations ==
UBM was a global B2B events organizer. Its businesses included UBM Asia, UBM EMEA and UBM Americas. It was also a shareholder of ITN and Press Association. UBM's brands included:

Conferences

- 4G World
- Black Hat Briefings
- DesignCon
- Game Developers Conference
- IFSEC International
- International Motorcycle Shows
- Interop
- MAGIC
- National Business Awards

Journals (published by Technology Group)

- Black Hat
- Content Marketing Institute
- Content Marketing World
- Dark Reading
- Enterprise Connect
- Fusion
- GDC
- Gamasutra
- HDI
- ICMI
- InformationWeek
- Interop ITX
- Network Computing
- No Jitter
- VRDC

Other

- Medical Devices & Diagnostics Industry
- Packaging Digest
- PlasticsToday
- Qmed
- Routes
- Security & Fire Excellence Awards
