= Computer Weekly =

British computer trade magazine

- Screenshot of the website in December 2024
- Editor: Bryan Glick
- Categories: Computer magazine
- Frequency: Weekly
- First issue: September 1966
- Final issue: 5 April 2011 (print edition)
- Company: Informa TechTarget
- Country: United Kingdom
- Language: English
- Website: www.computerweekly.com
- ISSN: 0010-4787

Computer Weekly is a digital magazine and website for IT professionals in the United Kingdom owned by Informa TechTarget. It was formerly published as a weekly print magazine by Reed Business Information for over 50 years. Topics covered within the magazine include outsourcing, security, data centres, information management, cloud computing, and mobile computing to computer hacking and strategy for IT management.

== History ==
Computer Weekly Issue 1 was published on 22 September 1966, billed as the first ever weekly technology publication. The editor for the first ten years was Chris Hipwell. John Lamb was editor in the 1980s and 1990s. Tony Collins was executive editor from 1989 to 2010.

The newspaper was available free to IT professionals who met the circulation requirements. A small minority of issues were sold in retail outlets, with the bulk of revenue received from display and recruitment advertising. During the 1990s there were often as many as 100 pages of advertisements per issue. The circulation figure was 135,035 according to the publisher's statement in August 2007. The last print edition came off the presses in April 2011 and the publication was transferred to a digital only edition, following TechTarget's acquisition of the Computer Weekly website and events business. On September 22, 2016, the magazine celebrated its 50th anniversary. At the time, its circulation figure was 200,000 magazines per week, and 400,000 magazines once monthly and quarterly regional editions were counted.

The magazine is still available free as a PDF digital edition. Bryan Glick is the editor-in-chief, having joined in November 2009.

Computer Weekly won the UK Periodical Publishers Association (PPA) "Campaign of the Year" Award five times in seven years as it was involved in IT-related campaigns such as the costs of the NHS computer system, websites for disabled people and the Chinook crash on Mull of Kintyre. More recently, its role in uncovering the Post Office Horizon scandal, with coverage beginning in 2008, has been widely highlighted. It won the "Campaign of the Year" category at the 2024 British Journalism Awards for its reporting on the scandal. Former Computer Weekly reporter Rebecca Thomson, who was responsible for early coverage of the scandal, was appointed Officer of the Order of the British Empire (OBE) in the 2025 New Year Honours for services to justice.

On 28 July 2021, Computer Weekly launched the voting for its Most Influential Woman in UK Technology awards.

== Website ==
The website, ComputerWeekly.com, provides users with IT news and analysis, white papers, and case studies. ComputerWeekly.com also provides information via webinars, podcasts, blogs, desktop alerts, and RSS feeds.

The site also features the Downtime blog, a section of the magazine that included a daily two-column Dilbert comic strip.

== Webinars ==
Webinars are presented on the site, lasting 45 minutes, beginning with a 5-minute introduction from the chair followed by presentations from an analyst and a specific case study. Viewers can email the panel with their questions throughout the webinar.

Users are required to register for each webinar and this is then viewed using an interface that allows users to watch the video of the webinar alongside supporting PowerPoint presentation slides.

The interface allows the user to enlarge and download slides, view speaker information, and support case studies. When viewed on-demand, the user can also pause, skip and select specific sections from the webinar to view.

== Podcasts ==
Podcasts are audio downloads provided in an MP3 format which are available on-demand. They are generated by the ComputerWeekly.com editorial team.

== Blogs ==
The blogs cover key issues facing IT decision-makers and bloggers include David Lacey, Cliff Saran, Karl Flinders, Matt Scott, Adrian Bridgwater, and Caroline Baldwin.

== Computer Weekly CW500 club ==
The Computer Weekly CW500 Club is a forum for senior IT directors in UK organizations. The club was launched in 1993 and was set up to provide business inspiration and networking opportunities for heads of IT. Membership is by invitation only, and members meet once a month in London to hear their peers talk on topical IT management issues.

== UKtech50 ==
In 2010, Computer Weekly launched the UKtech50 – a list of the 50 most influential people in the UK IT. The list is composed annually and announced at an event, typically in late November or early December. Past winners of UKtech50 are Philip Clarke, then the CIO of Tesco and now its CEO; Mike Lynch (businessman), founder and then-CEO of Autonomy; and Warren East, CEO of ARM.
