= Informa TechTarget =

American business-to-business media company

TechTarget, Inc.
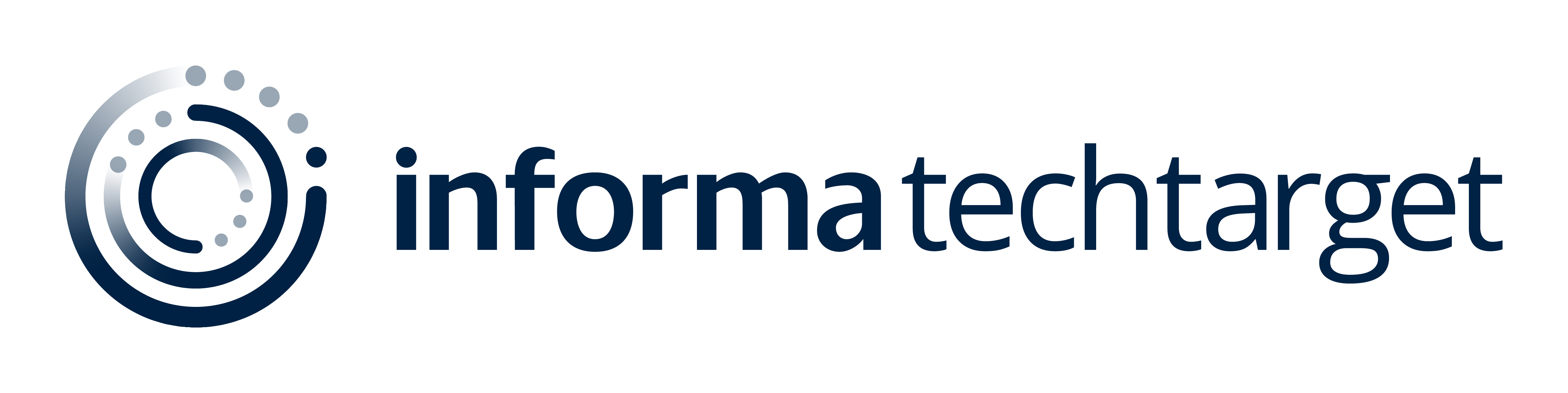
- Trade name: Informa TechTaget
- Company type: Public
- Traded as: Nasdaq: TTGT; Russell 2000 component
- Industry: Marketing
- Predecessor: UBM Technology Group (1971–2018)
- Founded: 1999; 27 years ago
- Headquarters: Newton, Massachusetts
- Products: Digital marketing
- Parent: Informa (57%)
- Website: techtarget.com

TechTarget, Inc. (doing business as Informa TechTarget) is an American company that offers data-driven marketing services to business-to-business technology vendors.

TechTarget, Inc. was founded in 1999; it is headquartered in Newton, Massachusetts, with offices in London, Munich, Paris, San Francisco, Singapore and Sydney.

== History ==
TechTarget was founded in 1999 by Greg Strakosch and Don Hawk as a spin-off of United Communications Group (UCG), the owner of Oil Price Information Service. In 2001, the company was recognized by B2B magazine on their Media Power 50 list. In 2005, AdAge named CEO Greg Strakosch a Top 25 Newsmaker.

In 2016, TechTarget named Michael Cotoia as CEO and board member, and elected Greg Stakosch as executive chairman. The company had an initial public offering in May 2007, being listed on the NASDAQ exchange with the symbol TTGT.

As of 2025, TechTarget's board of directors is chaired by Mary McDowell, an American technology executive.

Since launch, the company has made several acquisitions aimed at building its technology content reach:

- In 2003, TechTarget acquired Information Security Magazine.
- In 2004, the company acquired publications including: Bitpipe.com, TheServerSide.com and TheServerSide.net.
- In 2007 (the year the company went public), TechTarget acquired KnowledgeStorm for $58 million.
- In 2008, TechTarget acquired BrianMadden.com and BriForum. The company acquired LeMagIT and opened local operations in France.
- In 2011, it made a significant acquisition of UK-based Computer Weekly, which had been published as a weekly print magazine by Reed Business Information for more than 45 years.

The company launched its current purchase intent data services (IT Deal Alert) for technology vendors in 2014; the company has since added to the portfolio with a product called Priority Engine. In 2020, TechTarget acquired the technology webinar company BrightTALK. In late 2020, the firm also announced the acquisition of IT analyst firm Enterprise Strategy Group. In 2021, TechTarget announced the acquisition of Xtelligent Healthcare Media, a marketing services, media, and data company.

TechTarget announced in 2024 that it would merge with the digital business of Informa's Informa Tech division. The resulting company would retain the TechTarget name; Informa would hold a 57% stake in the merged company, and existing TechTarget shareholders would hold a 43% stake. The CEO of Informa Tech, Gary Nugent, would serve as CEO for the merged company.

The planned merger was completed in December 2024, with the resulting company being known as Informa TechTarget.
