= Informa =

British publishing and conference company

Informa plc
- Type: Public
- Traded as: LSE: INF; FTSE 100 Component
- Industry: Publishing, business intelligence, global exhibitions, events
- Predecessors: Penton (1904–2017); UBM plc (1918–2018); Ascential (1947–2024)
- Founded: December 1998; 27 years ago
- Headquarters: London, England, UK
- Number of locations: 150 offices
- Area served: 43+ countries worldwide
- Key people: John Rishton (chair); Stephen Carter, Baron Carter of Barnes (CEO)
- Services: Specialist information, scholarly research, electronic publishing, event management, exhibitions, business intelligence
- Revenue: ▲£4,041.4 million (2025)
- Operating income: ▲£1,139.8 million (2025)
- Net income: ▼£(145.4) million (2025)
- Number of employees: 14,000 (2026)
- Divisions: Informa Connect, Informa Festivals, Informa Markets, Informa TechTarget, Taylor & Francis
- Website: informa.com

Informa plc, sometimes styled informa, is a British publishing, business intelligence, and exhibitions group with headquarters in London, England. Informa is listed on the London Stock Exchange and is a constituent of the FTSE 100 Index. With offices in 42 countries, the company has approximately 14,000 employees. Informa owns numerous brands, including Fan Expo, VidCon, Cannes Lions International Festival of Creativity, CRC Press, Routledge, and Taylor & Francis.

== History ==
=== 1998 to 2013 ===
Informa itself was created in 1998 by the merger of IBC Group plc (formerly International Business Communications) and LLP Group plc (publisher of Lloyd's List).

In 2004, Informa merged with academic publisher Taylor & Francis, followed in 2005 with the acquisition of IIR Holdings.

In October 2006, the company was approached by Springer Science and Business Media in a takeover bid, but in early November the Informa board rejected the offer.

In early 2007, chairman Richard Hooper announced his retirement in May and, after consulting with major shareholders, the company moved chief executive Peter Rigby to chairman, and managing director David Gilbertson to Rigby's former post.

On 8 June 2008, The Sunday Telegraph revealed that United Business Media (UBM) had proposed a merger with Informa. The talks were confirmed by Informa in a press release that same day, but described as "preliminary". On 17 June talks with UBM ended.

In May 2009 the company announced that it would restructure its business to be incorporated in Jersey but tax resident in Switzerland. In 2014, Informa was redomiciled in the UK.

In July 2013, the company announced that Peter Rigby would retire at the end of 2013 to be replaced as CEO by Stephen Carter, who was first appointed a non-executive director in 2010. Informa has since acquired other conventions and placed them under the auspices of their Fan Expo HQ brand, including Dallas Comic Con and MegaCon.

In December 2013, Informa acquired the assets of Elsevier Business Intelligence (EBI) from Reed Elsevier.

=== 2014 to present ===
In January 2014, Carter became CEO of Informa plc. In 2016, Informa entered the FTSE 100.

In September 2016, Informa acquired Penton followed by Yachting Promotions Inc. in March 2017.

In September 2017, Informa announced that it would be acquiring Dove Medical Press.

In January 2018, Informa announced its intent to acquire UBM plc as part of its strategy to expand in North America and Asia. The transaction was completed in June 2018.

In 2019, Informa sold the former UBM Life Sciences to MJH Associates. Later in 2019, Informa traded its Agriculture Intelligence unit to IHS Markit in exchange for most of IHS Markit's Technology, Media and Telecoms division. Also in 2019, Informa sold the former Penton design & engineering, manufacturing, energy, buildings, and commercial vehicle divisions, and the former UBM Automotive, to Endeavor Business Media.

In January 2020, Informa acquired F1000 Research Limited.

In February 2020, Informa launched Omdia by consolidating its portfolio of market analyst companies, Ovum Ltd, Heavy Reading, Tractica, and the majority of IHS Markit's technology, media and telecommunications research business, into a unified brand.

Informa's in-person events were impacted by the Covid-19 pandemic, with many in-person events being cancelled or postponed. Informa's response included a move to virtual events and a focus on its subscription-based and digital products.

In June 2021, John Rishton was appointed as chairman, replacing Derek Mapp.

In December 2021, Informa announced a programme to divest its intelligence businesses. In February 2022, Informa sold its Informa Pharma Intelligence unit to investment fund, Warburg Pincus for $2.6 billion. Following the sale of their intelligence unit, Informa launched a share buyback programme.

In November 2022, Informa launched a joint venture, Tahaluf, partnered with the Saudi Federation for Cybersecurity, Programming and Drones (SAFCSP).

In January 2024, Informa announced that it would merge the digital business of Informa Tech with TechTarget. The business became Informa TechTarget in December 2024.

In July 2024, the company reached a deal to acquire media and events company Ascential for approximately £1.2 billion. The transaction was completed in October 2024.

== Operations ==
Informa is organized into five operating divisions: Informa Connect, Informa Festivals, Informa Markets, Informa TechTarget, and Taylor & Francis. The company also has a Global Support division.

In June 2021, John Rishton was appointed as chairman, replacing Derek Mapp.

== Brands ==
Informa owns numerous brands including:

=== Informa Connect ===
- The Bride Show
- Fan Expo
- Calgary Comic and Entertainment Expo
- Fan Expo Boston
- Fan Expo Canada
- Toronto Comicon
- Fan Expo Chicago
- Fan Expo Dallas
- Fan Expo Denver
- Fan Expo Vancouver
- MegaCon
- Middle East Film and Comic Con
- Nation's Restaurant News
- Restaurant Business, official magazine of the National Restaurant Association
- VidCon

=== Informa Festivals ===
- Black Hat Briefings
- Cannes Lions
- Game Developers Conference

=== Informa Markets ===
- Arab Health
- Aviation Week Network
- Dubai Airshow
- Farm Progress
- Magic
- Monaco Yacht Show
- World of Concrete

=== Informa TechTarget ===
- Computer Weekly
- Game Developer
- Industry Dive
- InformationWeek
- Light Reading
- MicroScope
- Ward's

=== Taylor & Francis ===
- CRC Press
- Dove Medical Press
- Routledge
