= Baby Cakes =

Baby Cakes may refer to:

- Baby Cakes (film), a 1989 American television film
- "Baby Cakes" (song), a 2004 song by 3 of a Kind
- "Baby Cakes" (My Little Pony: Friendship Is Magic), a TV episode
- New Orleans Baby Cakes, formerly the New Orleans Zephyrs, an American baseball team 1993–2019
- Babycakes, a 1984 book in the Tales of the City series by Armistead Maupin

== See also ==
- King cake, also known as baby cake
