= Sweet and Elite =

- My Little Pony: Friendship Is Magic episode
- Rarity (center) gains popularity and influence in Canterlot. ("Becoming Popular")
- Episode no.: Season 2 Episode 9
- Written by: Meghan McCarthy
- Original air date: December 3, 2011
- Running time: 22 minutes

Episode chronology
← Previous "The Mysterious Mare Do Well"	Next → "Secret of My Excess"
- My Little Pony: Friendship Is Magic season 2

"Sweet and Elite" is the ninth episode of the second season of the animated television series My Little Pony: Friendship Is Magic. The episode was written by Meghan McCarthy. It originally aired on The Hub on December 3, 2011. In this episode, Rarity travels to Canterlot to design a dress for Twilight's birthday but becomes entangled with the city's high society, which causes conflicts between her social aspirations and loyalty to her friends.

== Plot ==
External videos
- Sweet and Elite (full episode) — Official upload of the episode onto YouTube

In the Canterlot palace, Princess Celestia shows Rarity the luxurious room where she'll stay during her visit to Canterlot, which Twilight Sparkle requested. Rarity decides thank Twilight by making her a dress for her upcoming birthday. While sitting at a cafe with Opalescence, Rarity meets Jet Set and Upper Crust who compliment her hat. However, they walk away in disdain when window cleaner Hayseed Turnip Truck recognizes her and reveals that she is from Ponyville. Incensed, Rarity draws up a sophisticated design for Twilight's dress and heads out to shop for materials, where she accidentally collides with the influential Fancy Pants who becomes intrigued by her expensive materials and castle accommodations.

Fancy Pants invites Rarity to join him in a VIP box at the Wonderbolts Derby, where she impresses his entourage by correctly predicting the winner based on Rainbow Dash's insights about the racers' abilities. When asked about Rainbow Dash, Rarity lies and claims she is the Wonderbolts' trainer, which elevates her status among the elite social circle. Fancy Pants' friends invite Rarity to various high society events, and though she worries about finishing Twilight's dress, she accepts the invitations to maintain her newfound reputation and sings about her soaring popularity among Canterlot's elite ("Becoming Popular").

The next morning, Rarity receives an invitation to an exclusive garden party hosted by Jet Set and Upper Crust that conflicts with Twilight's birthday party, so she decides to attend the elite event and lies to her friends by claiming Opalescence is too sick to travel. However, her Ponyville friends surprise her by moving Twilight's birthday party to Canterlot so Rarity can attend, forcing her to quickly make Opalescence appear ill and frantically move between both events throughout the evening to maintain the illusion of attending each one.

When Rarity's friends crash the garden party and begin enthusiastically participating in the activities, the elite guests become frustrated by their behavior. Twilight reveals to Fancy Pants that Rarity made her simple dress and hails from Ponyville, which initially horrifies Rarity until she realizes the importance of her true friendships and proudly confirms her association with the Ponyville ponies. Fancy Pants calls them "charmingly rustic" and asks for introductions. Rarity learns that being genuine about your origins and friendships is more valuable than maintaining a false elite persona.

== Reception ==
Sherilyn Connelly, the author of Ponyville Confidential, gave the episode a "B+" rating. In her review of the episode in SF Weekly, Connelly praised Rarity's lesson about being proud of where you're from and noted her personal connection to the theme as a Fresno native living in San Francisco.

In a critical analysis of the episode, author Jen A. Blue called "Sweet and Elite" an "astoundingly good episode." Blue examined how the episode's plot draws directly from high school drama narratives and especially compared it to Mean Girls, while positioning this as Rarity's turn to be the star as the sole focus of an episode. She analyzed Rarity's character as being "equally readable as the villain of a high school drama" embodying the Queen Bee archetype, yet argued that what makes Rarity fascinating is how she "evokes stereotypes of the social climber or 'Queen Bee' while simultaneously evading them." Blue praised Meghan McCarthy's writing and wrote that even when Rarity prioritizes associating with Canterlot society over finishing Twilight's birthday dress, she does not stop caring about Twilight's feelings and notably does not ever admit to the friends that she is embarrassed by them.

Brendan Kachel of flayrah described "Sweet and Elite" as "completely average" and the weakest episode of the Royal Pony Wedding DVD. He compared the show's sitcom elements to Friends, where Rarity was compared to Ross Geller and Canterlot with New York. He wrote: "We laugh while it's on, then forget about it when it's not." Anime Superhero News called "Sweet and Elite" "the perfect example of what to typically expect from this show" and praised its excellent characters, humor, and entertainment value. The review highlighted the episode's originality and unpredictable plot structure, writing that it avoided the usual issue of being too predictable with its twists and original lesson. Republibot praised the episode's writing: "the way Rarity goes off course gradually, convincing herself that she's capable of attending three social functions and still finishing Twilight's dress on time felt very real." The review also commended the first-rate animation and musical montage and wrote that the episode proved popular with fans. Jamie Kingston of WomenWriteAboutComics praised how the episode dealt with the theme of peer pressure.

== Home media release ==
The episode was part of the Season 2 DVD set, released by Shout Factory on May 14, 2013. It is also part of the "Royal Pony Wedding" DVD released by Shout Factory.

== See also ==
- List of My Little Pony: Friendship Is Magic episodes
