= Just for Sidekicks =

- My Little Pony: Friendship Is Magic episode
- Episode no.: Season 3 Episode 11
- Written by: Corey Powell
- Original air date: January 26, 2013
- Running time: 22 minutes

Episode chronology
← Previous "Keep Calm and Flutter On"	Next → "Games Ponies Play"
- My Little Pony: Friendship Is Magic season 3

"Just for Sidekicks" is the eleventh episode of the third season of the animated television series My Little Pony: Friendship Is Magic. The episode was written by Corey Powell. It originally aired on The Hub on January 26, 2013. In this episode, Spike agrees to pet-sit for the Mane Six while they travel to the Crystal Empire, but the task proves more challenging than expected when he accidentally boards the train with the pets and the Cutie Mark Crusaders.

The episode takes place at the same time as the next episode, "Games Ponies Play", which premiered 2 weeks later.

== Plot ==
External videos
- Just for Sidekicks (full episode) — Official upload of the episode onto YouTube

Spike's plans to bake a jewel-encrusted cake crumble when he realizes he has consumed all the precious gems while mixing the batter. Soon, Fluttershy approaches him, seeking pet care services for Angel Bunny while the Mane Six travel to the Crystal Empire on official business. Recognizing a chance to replenish his gem supply, Spike eagerly expands his offer to include all six pets in exchange for payment from each owner, confident that caring for a few animals will be simple work.

However, the pets immediately begin wreaking havoc throughout the Golden Oak Library, destroying furniture and creating complete chaos. Overwhelmed, Spike attempts to delegate the work to the Cutie Mark Crusaders by convincing them that pet-sitting could earn them their cutie marks. The eager fillies prove equally incapable of managing the unruly animals, and their various approaches to pet care only create more problems while costing Spike one of his precious gems for supplies.

As Spike struggles to maintain control while leading the pets through Ponyville, a series of mishaps forces him to spend his remaining gems one by one. Angel escapes and boards the train bound for the Crystal Empire, forcing Spike to purchase tickets for himself, the Crusaders, and all the remaining pets. Spike desperately tries to keep the pets hidden from the Mane Six, who are traveling in the same car on their return trip to Ponyville. When Angel threatens to expose their presence by attacking Applejack's seat from below, Spike finally confesses his selfish motivations and apologizes to all the animals for treating them as obstacles rather than the companions that they really are. Touched by his remorse, the pets forgive him.

After successfully returning to Ponyville without detection, Spike greets the Mane Six at the station and receives praise for his excellent care of their pets. Spike returns home and once again realizes that he has no more jewels for his cake, to which he cries out in dismay.

== Reception ==
Sherilyn Connelly, the author of Ponyville Confidential, gave the episode a "B" rating and wrote that it (along with "Games Ponies Play", which she gave an "A") was the highest point of the season. She wrote that the two-parter was an "interesting experiment in story structure."

In a critical analysis of the episode, author Jen A. Blue described "Just for Sidekicks" as "yet another sitcom flail, in this case the hoary 'character takes on a new job they think will be easy, fails miserably' story" and analyzed Spike's behavior through a capitalist framework, arguing that he functions as a perfect match for a real-world corporation. Blue compared Spike's recruitment of the Cutie Mark Crusaders to work for free to real-world exploitation of young people in creative professions, especially in unpaid internships and contests that promise exposure instead of payment. However, Blue additionally offered a more redemptive interpretation of the episode and wrote that Spike's greed doesn't transform him as it did in "Secret of My Excess" because he has already accepted and integrated this trait, and suggested that "he had an idea of how to channel his negative traits, of which he is now fully aware, into positive results, but that effort failed because it is essentially capitalistic" in a show whose core values are inherently anti-capitalistic.

Daniel Alvarez of Unleash The Fanboy gave the episode a rating of 3.5 out of 5 and called it "definitely the weakest of the season and one of the weakest overall" and further asserted that Spike cannot hold his own episode. He criticized Spike's portrayal as "devious" and wrote that the episode made viewers dislike Spike; despite this, he praised the other supporting characters for providing the episode's entertaining moments. Raymond Gallant of Freakin' Awesome Network gave the episode a rating of 8.5 out of 10 and called it "a very strong filler episode". While Gallant acknowledged that the episode was not strictly necessary because the season had already focused on Spike, he praised Corey Powell's writing and found the episode far more enjoyable than expected. Brendan Kachel of flayrah wrote that the episode was the "much more interesting" part of the two-parter with "Games Ponies Play", which Kachel described as "weird".

== See also ==
- List of My Little Pony: Friendship Is Magic episodes
