= My Little Pony: Best Gift Ever =

2018 TV special

- Title card
- Written by: Michael Vogel
- Directed by: Denny Lu; Mike Myhre
- Music by: Daniel Ingram (songs); William Anderson (score)
- Countries of origin: United States; Canada

Production
- Executive producers: Stephen Davis; Nicole Dubuc; Kirsten Newlands; Sarah Wall
- Producers: Devon Cody; Eliza Hart; Colleen McAllister
- Editors: Greg Canning; Tom Harris; Nicole Dubuc
- Running time: 44 minutes
- Production companies: Allspark Animation; DHX Studios (Vancouver)

Original release
- Network: Discovery Family
- Release: October 27, 2018

My Little Pony: Best Gift Ever (also known as My Little Pony: Best Gift Ever! and My Little Pony: Friendship Is Magic: Best Gift Ever) is a double-length Christmas-themed special based on the animated television series My Little Pony: Friendship Is Magic, taking place in-between seasons eight and nine. It premiered on October 27, 2018 on Discovery Family.

In this special, Twilight Sparkle and her friends do a "Hearth's Warming Helper" to get just one Hearth's Warming present for another pony, to which they race all over Equestria to find the perfect gift.

== Plot ==
With Hearth's Warming Eve approaching, Twilight and her friends decide to hold a "Hearth's Warming Helper" so that each of them only has to find a gift for one other friend.

For Pinkie Pie's gift, Twilight finds a recipe for a legendary magic pudding that is dangerous if prepared incorrectly. She becomes stressed trying to both prepare it and entertain Shining Armor, Princess Cadance and Flurry Heart, who have come to visit for the holiday. Unbeknownst to them, Flurry Heart adds extra ingredients that cause the pudding to boil over.

Pinkie travels to Yakyakistan seeking advice for Twilight's gift. Prince Rutherford directs her north to the home of a trio of magical flying reindeer, Aurora, Bori and Alice. They claim to give her the "perfect gift" whose significance she will understand later.

Rarity orders a special hat as her gift to Applejack, but it is misdelivered to a nut farm. She travels there to collect it, but the resident farmer couple believes it to be a gift for their budding fashion designer son, Pistachio. Deducing the hat was not for him, he offers to return it, but Rarity insists he keep it so as to encourage his passion.

Spike swaps his recipient with Fluttershy so that he can give a gift to Rarity. He tries to craft a gift himself as a way to acknowledge her artistic creativity, but eventually falls asleep from exhaustion after several failed attempts.

Fluttershy, now tasked to find a gift for Rainbow Dash, travels with Applejack, who has Spike, to Rainbow Falls to shop for their gifts. There they find Flim and Flam swindling unwitting shoppers into buying cheaply-made dolls. They manage to expose their plot, but only after buying several of the dolls and using up their gift money.

Discord bothers Rainbow Dash against half-heartedly buying a meaningless gift for Fluttershy. Upon his suggestion, she catches a cute creature called a Winterchilla, unaware that it turns into a monstrous Winterzilla after dark.

The group meet up at Twilight's castle to find it is flooded with the unstable pudding, and as they attempt to flee, the Winterzilla blocks their exit. Pinkie, realizing that her present is the pudding's remaining ingredients, uses them to stabilize it. Fluttershy manages to calm and befriend the Winterzilla, which Discord reveals to have been his plan all along. The group all apologize for the disappointing gifts they ended up giving each other. Using a homemade guitar, Spike sings a song as his gift to Rarity, hoping his uninspiring gift did not ruin her holiday. Rarity is nonetheless appreciative and the group realizes that the best gift they can give to each other is their friendship.

== Production ==
A song animatic from the special was shown at the 2018 My Little Pony 2018 San Diego Comic-Con panel.

A promo for the special originally had a layering error involving the reindeer's flight over Twilight's castle. Supervising director Jim Miller confirmed on Twitter that this was fixed. Additionally, Miller also counted this special as an episode.

=== Music ===
Like the previous three Hearth's Warming episodes, the songs were composed by Daniel Ingram with lyric writing shared between Ingram and Michael Vogel.

- "One More Day" – Twilight Sparkle, Fluttershy, Applejack, Rainbow Dash, Rarity, Pinkie Pie, Spike and choir
- "The True Gift of Gifting" – Spike and Twilight Sparkle; backing vocals Fluttershy, Applejack, Rainbow Dash, Rarity, Pinkie Pie and choir

== Cast ==
- Tara Strong as Twilight Sparkle
  - Rebecca Shoichet as Twilight Sparkle (singing voice)
- Tabitha St. Germain as Rarity, Flurry Heart, and Derpy
  - Kazumi Evans as Rarity (singing voice)
- Ashleigh Ball as Rainbow Dash and Applejack
- Andrea Libman as Pinkie Pie and Fluttershy
  - Shannon Chan-Kent as Pinkie Pie (singing voice)
- Cathy Weseluck as Spike
- Andrew Francis as Shining Armor
- Britt McKillip as Princess Cadance
- John de Lancie as Discord
- The Flim Flam Brothers
  - Sam Vincent as Flim
  - Scott McNeil as Flam
- Garry Chalk as Prince Rutherford and Oak Nut
- Ingrid Nilson as Limestone Pie, Maud Pie, Marble Pie, and Butternut
- Sean Thomas as Pistachio
- Gift Givers of the Grove
  - Asia Mattu as Aurora
  - Alison Wandzura as Bori
  - Meaghan Hommy as Alice

Apple Bloom (Michelle Creber), Scootaloo (Madeleine Peters), Sweetie Belle (Claire Corlett), Big McIntosh, Sugar Belle, Granny Smith, Grand Pear, Igneous Rock Pie, Cloudy Quartz, and Parcel Post (Sam Vincent) sing during "One More Day", but are uncredited.

== Release ==
The special premiered on October 27, 2018 on Discovery Family. The special is available on Netflix as of November 25, 2018 in the United States and Canada.

=== Home media ===
The special was released on DVD on November 26, 2018 in the United Kingdom and distributed by Hasbro Trinity.

== Merchandise and other media ==
The holiday special is adapted into three storybooks from September to October 2018, the book A Perfectly Pinkie Present!, Board Book and A Present for Everypony.

=== Animated shorts ===
The special was accompanied by three animated shorts.

No.	Title	Written by	Original release date
1	"Triple Pony Dare Ya"	Kim Beyer-Johnson	December 11, 2018
Applejack and Rainbow Dash challenge each other to perform a series of crazy stunts.
2	"The Great Escape Room"	Kim Beyer-Johnson	December 11, 2018
Pinkie Pie sets up an escape room challenge for her friends.
3	"Mystery Voice"	Kate Leth	December 11, 2018
Classes at the School of Friendship are interrupted by a string of odd intercom announcements, each in a different pony's voice.
