= Games Ponies Play =

- My Little Pony: Friendship Is Magic episode
- Episode no.: Season 3 Episode 12
- Directed by: James Wootton
- Written by: Dave Polsky
- Original air date: February 9, 2013
- Running time: 22 minutes

Guest appearances
- Patricia Drake as Ms. Peachbottom; Veena Sood as Ms. Harshwhinny

Episode chronology
← Previous "Just for Sidekicks"	Next → "Magical Mystery Cure"
- My Little Pony: Friendship Is Magic (season 3)

"Games Ponies Play" is the twelfth episode of the third season of My Little Pony: Friendship Is Magic as well as the 64th overall. Directed by James Wootton and written by Dave Polsky, "Games Ponies Play" premiered on The Hub on February 9, 2013. Occurring during the events of the previous episode, "Just for Sidekicks", the episode featured Twilight Sparkle, Rainbow Dash, Fluttershy, Pinkie Pie and Applejack trying to convince an inspector to host the Equestria Games at the Crystal Empire.

== Plot ==
External videos
- Games Ponies Play (full episode) — Official upload of the episode onto YouTube

Twilight Sparkle and her friends go to the Crystal Empire, which is due to be inspected to host the Equestria Games, the biggest sporting event in all of Equestria. They leave all of their pets behind at home with Spike. Upon arrival, they meet Princess Cadance in a spa. While they enjoy the amenities of the spa, a messenger arrives to tell Princess Cadance that the inspector of the games, Ms. Harshwhinny, is due to arrive in fifteen minutes, much earlier than expected. This causes the ponies to panic, but Twilight manages to calm down the situation and tells Rarity to do the headdress of Cadance. The others go to the train station. Once a yellow pony steps out of the train, Twilight and her friends see her floral-print suitcase and think that she is Ms. Harshwhinny, and go to welcome her.

The friends show the inspector the castle, who seems to have claustrophobia and altocelarophobia. (Note: Fear of high ceilings.) Therefore, she is eager to go outside the castle, but Twilight and her friends perform a cheer before going outside to properly welcome the inspector, who seems to be surprised that Cadance knows her. After leaving the castle, the friends take the inspector to the newly-built stadium. The inspector is so happy to be outside, that she runs across the track and says that she is enjoying her vacation. After this, the friends realize that they got the wrong pony: Ms. Peachbottom.

Twilight and her friends leave Ms. Peachbottom behind and rush to the train station, but Ms. Harshwhinny, who has a similar-looking floral print bag, has already arrived and is having a "hooficure" (Note: Portmanteau of hoof and pedicure.) at the spa. She complains to Cadance that no one welcomed her into the empire, which leads to Rainbow Dash confessing that they welcomed the wrong pony. After hearing the story of Ms. Peachbottom, the inspector announces the Crystal Empire as the next host of the Equestria Games. The enthusiasm of the Crystal Ponies supercharge the Crystal Heart, which sends a beam of light into the sky.

As the friends board the train to go back to home, Applejack hears something growling. Spike, the Cutie Mark Crusaders and the six pets are shown hiding under the seats, depicting the climax of "Just for Sidekicks".

== Reception ==
Sherilyn Connelly, the author of Ponyville Confidential, gave the episode an "A" rating and wrote that it (along with "Just for Sidekicks") was the highest point of the season. She wrote that the two-parter was an "interesting experiment in story structure."

Ethan Lewis of Den of Geek called the episode both "highly unusual" and "wonderful", praising how the episode "manage[d] to sneak in a couple lessons". Unleash the Fanboy's Daniel Alvarez gave "Games Ponies Play" 4.5 out of 5 stars, calling it a "pretty solid" and "really great episode". He remarked it as one of the best season 3 episodes, complimenting the story, character moments and appearances of Princess Cadance.

== Home media ==
The episode was included in two releases by Shout! Factory: Princess Twilight Sparkle and Games Ponies Play.
