= Andrew Francis =

Canadian actor

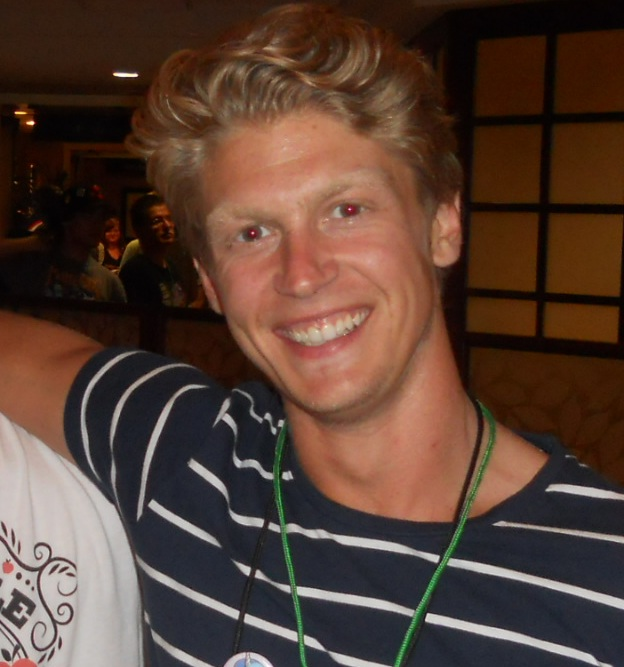
- Francis at the Brony convention Everfree Northwest in 2012
- Born: Vancouver, British Columbia, Canada
- Occupation: Actor
- Years active: 1995–present
- Agent: Carrier Talent Management

Andrew Francis is a Canadian actor. He has appeared in many television shows and films including My Little Pony: Friendship Is Magic as Shining Armor, MegaMan NT Warrior as MegaMan.EXE, Monster Rancher as Genki, Hero 108 as Lin Chung, Lamb Chop's Play Along, Sushi Pack, Poltergeist: The Legacy, Dark Angel, Twilight Zone, The L Word, Smallville, Kyle XY, and Chesapeake Shores. He has also appeared in theatrical releases such as Knockaround Guys, Agent Cody Banks, Final Destination 3, and The Invisible.

== Career ==
Francis started voice acting at the age of 9, starring in over 20 animated series and many anime series, such as RoboCop: Alpha Commando, X-Men: Evolution as Iceman, Johnny Test as Gil Nexdor, Action Man, Bionicle: Mask of Light as Jaller, Dragon Booster as Phistus, Hot Wheels: Acceleracers as Vert Wheeler, Voltron Force as Lance, Max Steel as Max McGrath, Slugterra as Kord Zane, Ninjago as Morro, and his main role as Cole since the death of Kirby Morrow, Monster Rancher, Vision of Escaflowne, and Dinotrux as Ty Rux. He also appeared in one episode of Smallville.

== Filmography ==
=== Film ===
Year	Title	Role	Notes
1989	Yoroiden Samurai Trooper Gaiden	Kento of Hardrock (English version, voice)	Video
1989	Yoroiden Samurai Trooper: Kikôtei densetsu	Kento of Hardrock (English version, voice)	Video
1991	Yoroiden Samurai Trooper: Message	Kento of Hardrock (English version, voice)	Video
1997	Night Warriors: Darkstalkers' Revenge	Kid 1 (English version, voice)	Video
1998	Snowden: Raggedy Ann & Andy's Adventure	Raggedy Andy (voice)	Video Short
1998	Sammy the Squirrel	Sammy (voice)	
2000	Epicenter	Brad	
2000	Escaflowne: The Movie	Dilandau Albatou (English version, voice)	
2000	One Piece Pilot 1	Luffy (voice)	Short
2001	Knockaround Guys	Matty (Age 13)	
2001	A Christmas Adventure ...From a Book Called Wisely's Tales	Nick (voice)	Video
2002	Evolution: The Animated Movie	(voice)	Video
2003	Bionicle: Mask of Light	Jaller (voice)	Video
2003	Polly Pocket: Lunar Eclipse	Rick (voice)	Video
2004	Superbabies: Baby Geniuses 2	Ken (Age 16)	Video
2004	Mobile Suit Gundam Seed: The Far-Away Dawn	Muruta Azrael (English version, voice)	Video
2004	Mobile Suit Gundam Seed: Special Edition III, The Rumbling Sky	Muruta Azrael (English version, voice)	Video
2005	Ghost in the Shell: Stand Alone Complex - The Laughing Man	Reporter/Detective/Armed Suit Soldier #1 (English version, voice)	Video
2005	Hot Wheels: AcceleRacers – The Ultimate Race	Vert Wheeler (voice)	Film
2005	Polly Pocket: 2 Cool at the Pocket Plaza	Rick (voice)	Video Short
2006	Final Destination 3	Payton	
2006	The Barbie Diaries	Todd (voice)	Video
2006	The Girl Who Leapt Through Time	Chiaki Mamiya (English version, voice)	
2006	PollyWorld	Rick (voice)	Video
2008	The Nutty Professor	Brad/Tad (voice)	Video
2009	The Sandwich	Rick	Short
2009	Monday Is My Favourite Time of Year	Randy Rockwell	Short
2010	Frankie & Alice	Cop #2	
2010	Mobile Suit Gundam 00 the Movie: A Wakening of the Trailblazer	Lasse Aeon (English version, voice)	
2011	Barbie in a Mermaid Tale 2	Stargazer Leader/Stargazer/Cichlid (voice)	Video
2013	Monster	Boy 2	Short
2013	Wild Nothing	Party Host	Short
2014	Dial Y for Yesterday	Igor (voice)	Short
2014	Primary	Mitchell	
2014	Slugterra: Return of the Elementals	Kord Zane/Shadow Clan Leader (voice)	
2014	Barbie and the Secret Door	Prince Kieran (voice)	
2014	Deeper: The Retribution of Beth	Steve Colter	
2015	Slugterra: Slug Fu Showdown	Kord Zane/Henchman 1 (voice)	Video
2015	Max Steel: The Wrath of Makino	Maxwell "Max" McGrath/Max Steel/Others (voice)	Short
2015	Max Steel: The Dawn of Morphos	(voice)	Short
2015	Max Steel: Maximum Morphos	Maxwell 'Max' McGrath/Max Steel (voice)	Short
2015	Slugterra: Eastern Caverns	Kord/Shadow Clan Leader/Generic Goon (voice)	
2015	My Little Pony Equestria Girls: Friendship Games	Shining Armor (voice)	
2016	Max Steel Team Turbo: Fusion Tek	Max Magrath (voice)	
2016	Slugterra: Into the Shadows	Kord/Shadow Clan Leader/Mongo/Others (voice)	
2017	Prodigals	Eliot	
2021	The Unforgivable	Corey	

=== Television ===
Year	Title	Role	Notes
1995	Mobile Suit Gundam Wing	Additional Voices (voice)	Unknown
1995	The New Adventures of Madeline	Additional Voices (voice)	Unknown
1996	Escaflowne	Dilandau Albatou/Young Van (English version, voice)	Recurring (Season 1)
1996	Boys Over Flowers	Sojiro Nishikado (English version, voice)	Main (Season 1)
1997	Breaking the Surface: The Greg Louganis Story	Bully Boy #1	Television film
1997	Key the Metal Idol	Toshihiko (English version, voice)	Episode: "Exit"
1997	Super Dave's All Stars	Karate Kid	Unknown
1997	Dead Man's Gun	Boy	Episode: "Death Warrant"
1997	Extreme Dinosaurs	Dylan (voice)	Recurring (Season 1)
1997–1998, 2000–2003	Dragon Ball Z	Dende (Canadian version, voice)	Recurring (Seasons 2, 9–11, 14–16)
1998	Brain Powerd	Nakki Guys (English version, voice)	Recurring (Season 1)
1998	Monkey Magic	Prince Nata (English version, voice)	Recurring (Season 1)
1998–1999	You, Me and the Kids	Kevin	2 episodes
1998–1999	RoboCop: Alpha Commando	(voice)	Recurring (Season 1)
1999	Master Keaton	Hiroshi Matsui (English version, voice)	Episode: "Devil Like an Angel"
1999	Millennium	Frank's Brother	Episode: "Seven and One"
1999	Poltergeist: The Legacy	Tony	Episode: "Gaslight"
1999	Cybersix	Julian (voice)	Main (Season 1)
1999	NASCAR Racers: The Movie	Miles McCutchen (voice)	Television film
1999	Little Witch	Marcus (voice)	TV Short
1999–2000	Sabrina: The Animated Series	(voice)	Recurring (Season 1)
1999–2000	Weird-Ohs	Unknown	Recurring (Season 1)
1999–2000	Trouble Chocolate	Sardine (English version, voice)	Recurring (Season 1)
1999–2000	Infinite Ryvius	Airs Blue (English version, voice)	
1999–2001	NASCAR Racers	Miles McCutchen (voice)	Main (Seasons 1–2)
1999–2001	Monster Rancher	Genki/Additional voices (voice)	Main (Seasons 1–2)
2000	Cardcaptors	Zachary Marker	Recurring
2000	Generation O!	Kemp (voice)	Main (Season 1)
2000	So Weird	Russell	Episode: "Banglebye"
2000	Adventures from the Book of Virtues	Zach Nichols (voice)	Main (Season 3, replacing Pamela Adlon)
2000	Rainbow Fish	Blue (voice)	Main
2000	Inuyasha	Princess Tsuyu's Lord (English version, voice)	Episode: "Tonosama yôkai - Kyûjûkyû no gama"
2000–2001	Action Man	Templeton Storm/Tempest (voice)	Main (Seasons 1–2)
2000–2002	What About Mimi?	Budweiser "Buddy" Wickersham (voice)	Main (Seasons 1–2)
2000, 2003–2004	Inuyasha	Hiten (English version, voice)	4 episodes
2001	Earth Maiden Arjuna	Tokio Oshima (English version, voice)	Mini Series
2001	The SoulTaker	Young Shiro (English version, voice)	Episode: "Kotô no oni hen"
2001	The SoulTaker	Thug (English version, voice)	Episode: "Kokui no seibo hen"
2001	Dark Angel	Male X6	Episode: "Bag 'Em"
2001	MegaMan NT Warrior	MegaMan.EXE (English version, voice)	Main (Seasons 1–2)
2001–2002	Project ARMS	Keith Green (English version, voice)	Recurring (Season 2)
2001–2002	Ultimate Book of Spells	Gus (voice)	Recurring (Season 1)
2001–2002	Evolution: the Animated Series	Wayne Green (voice)	Main (Season 1)
2001–2003	X-Men: Evolution	Robert Drake / Iceman (voice)	Recurring (Seasons 2–4)
2002	Jeremiah	Young Markus	2 episodes
2002	Groove Squad	Zeke (voice)	Video
2002	Dragon Drive	Kyoji Tachibana (English version, voice)	Main (Season 1)
2002–2003	Mobile Suit Gundam Seed	Muruta Azrael (English version, voice)	Recurring (Season 1)
2002–2003	Transformers: Armada	Billy (voice)	Recurring (Season 1)
2002–2003	Hot Wheels Highway 35 World Race	Vert Wheeler (voice)	Television film, originally shown on Cartoon Network in 2002 and received a physical release in 2003
2002–2005	The Cramp Twins	Judith Phelps/Calvin Phelps/Brick (voice)	4 episodes
2003	D.C. Sniper: 23 Days of Fear	Jeffrey Duncan	Television film
2003	Jungledyret Hugo	Hugo (voice)	TV series
2004	The Goodbye Girl	Young Man Outside Club	Television film
2004	Smallville	William Taylor	Episode: "Truth"
2004–2005	Dragon Booster	Phistus (voice)	Recurring (Seasons 1-2)
2004–2006	The L Word	Howie Fairbanks	3 episodes
2005	Life as We Know It	Chuck Dimeo	Episode: "A Little Problem"
2005	Elemental Gelade	Greyarts (English version, voice)	Episode: "Oburigâzu he no ketsui"
2005	Hot Wheels: AcceleRacers – Ignition	Vert Wheeler (voice)	Television film
2005–2014	Johnny Test	Gil/Others (voice)	Recurring (Seasons 1–6)
2006	Inuyasha	Rengokuki (English version, voice)	2 episodes
2006	Ayakashi - Samurai Horror Tales	Medicine Peddler (English version, voice)	Episode: "Bakeneko"
2006	Kyle XY	Jeff Preston	Episode: "Diving In"
2006	.hack//Roots	Haseo (English version, voice)	Main (Season 1)
2006	Split Decision	Jason	Television film
2006	Totally Awesome	Zeke	Television film
2006	Death Note	To=Oh University Student (English version, voice)	Episode: "Doubt"
2006	The Story of Saiunkoku	Seiran Si (English version, voice)	Main (Seasons 1–2)
2006–2007	Nana	Takumi Ichinose (English version, voice)	Recurring (Season 1)
2006–2007	Powerpuff Girls Z	Bobby Green/Ace (English version, voice)	Recurring (Season 1)
2007	Devil's Diary	Andy	Television film
2007	Blood Ties	Alexander	Episode: "The Devil You Know"
2007	Tin Man	Jeb	Mini Series
2007	Finley the Fire Engine	Dex (voice)	Unknown
2007	Supernatural	Brody/Rick Craig	Episode: "Hollywood Babylon"
2007–2009	Sushi Pack	Ikura Maki (voice)	Main (Seasons 1–2)
2007–2009	Mobile Suit Gundam 00	Lasse Aeon/Controller (English version, voice)	Recurring (Seasons 1–2)
2008	Ultraviolet: Code 044	Luka Bloom (English version, voice)	Main (Season 1)
2008	The Christmas Clause	Unconvincing Elf	Television film
2009	Phantom Racer	Owen	Television film
2009	Stranger with My Face	Jeff Rankin	Television film
2009	Sight Unseen	Henry Baker	Television film
2009	Fakers	Ben Cruikshank	Television film
2009–2012	Iron Man: Armored Adventures	Rick Jones, Clint Barton / Hawkeye (voice)	6 episodes
2010–2012	Hero: 108	Lin Chung/others (voice)	Main (Seasons 1–2)
2010	Seven Deadly Sins	Travis Knight	Episode: "Episode #1.1"
2010	Psych	Dickie	Episode: "We'd Like to Thank the Academy"
2010	Black Lagoon: Roberta's Blood Trail	Hidalgo (English version, voice)	Episode: "Collateral Massacre"
2011	Black Lagoon: Roberta's Blood Trail	Wright (English version, voice)	3 episodes
2011	Trading Christmas	Jason	Television film
2011–2012	Voltron Force	Lance (voice)	Main (Season 1)
2012	Supernatural	Lee	Episode: "Party On, Garth"
2012	Flashpoint	Allan Thompson	Episode: "Sons of the Father"
2012	Dinosaur Train	Patrick Pachycephalosaurus (voice)	Episode: "Dome-Headed Dinosaur"
2012–2016	Slugterra	Kord/Shadow Clan Leader/Mongo/Others (voice)	Main (Seasons 1–5)
2012–2022	Ninjago	Shade / Morro / Fire Breather / Ghost Henchman / Ship Captain / Warrior / Cole (voice)	
2012–2017, 2019	My Little Pony: Friendship Is Magic	Shining Armor/Others (voice)	Recurring (Seasons 2–7, 9)
2013	Animism	Nico/Eldest #2 (voice)	Main (Season 1)
2013	Tom Dick & Harriet	Dick Varnett	Television film
2013	Ultimate Wolverine vs. Hulk	Panchem Lama/Forge/James (voice)	Mini Series
2013–2014	Lego Star Wars: The Yoda Chronicles	Bail Organa/Commander Cody/Cad Bane (voice)	4 episodes
2013–2014	Sabrina: Secrets of a Teenage Witch	Ambrose/Others (voice)	Recurring (Season 1)
2013–2015	Max Steel	Maxwell "Max" McGrath/Max Steel/Others (voice)	Main (Seasons 1–2)
2014	A Ring by Spring	Josh	Television film
2014	Slugterra: Ghoul from Beyond	Kord Zane (voice)	Television film
2014	The 100	Boy in Mask	Episode: "His Sister's Keeper"
2014	Mr. Miracle	Erich	Television film
2014	Christmas Icetastrophe	Scott Crooge	Television film
2014	Dr. Dimensionpants	Lennon/Unicorn #2 (voice)	Unknown
2014–2015	World Trigger	Yuichi Jin (English version, voice)	Main (Seasons 1–2)
2014–2015	Cedar Cove	Derek	Recurring (Season 3)
2015	TOME: Terrain of Magical Expertise	The Virus (voice)	Episode: "Truth. Tears. Ambition."
2015	Lego Star Wars: Droid Tales	Bail Organa (voice)	Mini Series
2015	Gintama	Tatsuma Sakamoto (English version, voice)	4 episodes
2015	Tis the Season for Love	Barry	Television film
2015–2017	Dinotrux	Ty Rux/Others (voice)	Main (Seasons 1–5)
2016	Max Steel: Team Turbo	Max McGrath (voice)	Film
2016	Ms. Matched	Alex	Television film
2016	Twist of Fate	Tom	Television film
2016	Supernoobs	The Incredibly Amazing Man (voice)	Episode: "The Supernoobs Meet Incredibly Amazing Man"
2016	No Tomorrow	Wes Hofley	Episode: "No Regrets"
2016	Xylo: The Show	Ed	Television film
2016–2022	Chesapeake Shores	Connor O'Brien	Main
2017	Nils Holgersson	(English version, voice)	Recurring (Season 1)
2017	A Bundle of Trouble: An Aurora Teagarden Mystery	Rory Brown	Television film
2017	Engaging Father Christmas	Josh	Television film
2017	Coming Home for Christmas	Kip	Television film
2017	Loudermilk	Kevin	2 episodes
2017–2018	Littlest Pet Shop: A World of Our Own	Checkers Pengo/Scrapper #2/German Shepherd/Others (voice)	Recurring (Seasons 1–2)
2017–2018	Beyblade Burst	Alexander "Xander" Shakadera (English version, voice)	Recurring (Seasons 1–2)
2017–2018	Dinotrux Supercharged	Ty Rux (voice)	Main (Seasons 1–3)
2018	Z-O-M-B-I-E-S	Dancer	Television film
2018	The Age of Adulting	Seth	Unknown Series
2018	My Little Pony: Best Gift Ever	Shining Armor (voice)	Television film
2018	Christmas in Evergreen: Letters to Santa	Oliver	Television film
2019	The Past Never Dies	Jacob Fast	Television film
2020	Coach Me If You Can	Erico Platana (voice)	Main
2020	Christmas She Wrote	Stephen	Television film
2021	My Little Pony: Pony Life	Shining Armor (voice)	Episode: "Little Miss Fortune"
2023	The Flash	Tony Stewart	Episode: "The Good, the Bad and the Lucky"

=== Video games ===
Year	Title	Role	Notes
2003	Mobile Suit Gundam: Encounters in Space	Ford Romfellow	English version
2005	Mobile Suit Gundam SEED: Never Ending Tomorrow	Muruta Azrael	English version
2005	SSX on Tour	Tyson Logan	
2005	Devil Kings	Scorpio	English version
2009	Dynasty Warriors: Gundam 2	Judau Ashta	English version
2011	Dynasty Warriors: Gundam 3	Judau Ashta	English version
2012	My Little Pony: Friendship Is Magic	Shining Armor	
2018	Dragalia Lost	Giovanni	English version
2023	Mega Man Battle Network Legacy Collection	MegaMan.EXE	English version
