= Family Appreciation Day =

- My Little Pony: Friendship Is Magic episode
- A bustling population in Ponyville emerges thanks to Granny Smith (bottom).
- Episode no.: Season 2 Episode 12
- Written by: Cindy Morrow
- Original air date: January 7, 2012
- Running time: 22 minutes

Episode chronology
← Previous "Hearth's Warming Eve"	Next → "Baby Cakes"
- My Little Pony: Friendship Is Magic season 2

"Family Appreciation Day" is the twelfth episode of the second season of the animated television series My Little Pony: Friendship Is Magic. The episode was written by Cindy Morrow. It originally aired on The Hub on January 7, 2012. In this episode, Apple Bloom is embarrassed about bringing her eccentric grandmother Granny Smith to school for Family Appreciation Day.

== Plot ==
External videos
- Family Appreciation Day (full episode) — Official upload of the episode onto YouTube

Apple Bloom awakens one night to discover Granny Smith racing around Sweet Apple Acres wearing kitchen pots and hollering about timberwolves, which signals the approaching harvest of magical zap apples that the family uses to create their famous zap apple jam. The next morning, electrical storms cause barren trees to instantly sprout leaves and flowers, while Granny Smith performs bizarre rituals like donning rabbit costumes and hopping around watering cans while reciting the alphabet. When Diamond Tiara witnesses this during her father's business visit, she mocks Granny Smith and plants seeds of shame in Apple Bloom's mind about her grandmother.

At school, teacher Cheerilee announces that each student must bring a family member for Family Appreciation Day presentations, and despite Apple Bloom's protests that her siblings are too busy with harvest duties, Diamond Tiara maliciously suggests that Granny Smith should be the presenter. Dreading the inevitable humiliation from her classmates witnessing Granny's eccentric behavior, Apple Bloom enlists the Cutie Mark Crusaders to help devise elaborate schemes to prevent the presentation, including faking illness, attempting to harvest the zap apples themselves, and even forging a fake telegram to lure Granny away on the scheduled day.

When Family Appreciation Day arrives and all their sabotage attempts fail, Granny Smith unexpectedly delivers a captivating historical account. She reveals how she and her family were nomadic seed merchants who received land from Princess Celestia near the dangerous Everfree Forest, where young Granny discovered the first zap apple tree during a desperate food shortage and learned to cultivate them through trial and experimentation. Her zap apple jam recipe attracted settlers from across the land, including Diamond Tiara's own great-grandfather, which ultimately led to the establishment of Ponyville itself.

Granny Smith's presentation earns applause from everyone, including Cheerilee. Irritated, Diamond Tiara tries to call Granny a "kooky old lady", but Apple Bloom proudly defends her grandmother. Apple Bloom gains appreciation for the wisdom and history behind her grandmother's seemingly strange customs as she realizes that what appeared embarrassing actually represented generations of valuable knowledge and tradition that deserved respect rather than shame.

== Reception ==
Sherilyn Connelly, the author of Ponyville Confidential, gave the episode a "B-" rating. In her review of the episode in SF Weekly, Connelly commented that Twilight Sparkle was absent and Applejack only appeared in a cameo role, writing that this was "a sign of how confident the show has become about the world it's created, and deservedly so."

Anime Superhero News called the episode "by far one of the best episodes of the show" and praised its mixture of seriousness and humor, original storyline, and expanded Equestrian history.

Raymond Gallant of Freakin' Awesome Network gave the episode a rating of 7 out of 10 and called it "an okay episode" with a great surprise ending. He praised the addition of Ponyville's origin story and the creativity of the zap apples, but criticized the minimal presence of the Mane Six.

A review from Republibot called the episode "an instant classic" and praised it for tackling dual moral lessons about respect for elders and social conformity.

== In popular culture ==
The episode was referenced in Alan Moore and Kevin O'Neill's The League of Extraordinary Gentlemen Vol. III, where a zap apple energy drink is shown alongside a can of Duff Beer.

== Home media release ==
The episode was part of the Season 2 DVD set, released by Shout Factory on May 14, 2013.

== See also ==
- List of My Little Pony: Friendship Is Magic episodes
