= List of Dinotrux episodes =

American animated television series

Dinotrux is an animated television series. It is based on Chris Gall's illustrated children's book series, which features a fictional prehistoric world inhabited by hybrid characters that are part reptile and part mechanical tool referred to as Reptools. The series debuted on August 14, 2015 on Netflix, while the second season was released on March 11, 2016, the third on October 7, 2016, the fourth on March 31, 2017, the fifth on August 18, 2017, the sixth on November 10, 2017, the seventh on March 23, 2018, and the eighth on August 3, 2018.

During the course of the series, 78 episodes of Dinotrux were released over eight seasons, concluding on August 3, 2018.

== Series overview ==
Season	Subtitle	Episodes	Originally released
1	—N/a	10	August 14, 2015
2	—N/a	13	March 11, 2016
3	—N/a	16	October 7, 2016
4	—N/a	7	March 31, 2017
5	—N/a	6	August 18, 2017
6	Supercharged	6	November 10, 2017
7	Supercharged	7	March 23, 2018
8	Supercharged	13	August 3, 2018

== Episodes ==
=== Season 1 (2015) ===
Set in the Mechazoic era of a prehistoric world populated by hybrid dinosaur-construction vehicles called Dinotrux, and hybrid reptile-tools called Reptools, Two best friends, Ty, a Tyrannosaurus Trux, and Revvit, a Reptool, must team up with other inhabitants of the world to defend their community and their work from an evil T-Trux, named D-Structs. It's time to 'Trux It Up'. The series premiered on August 14, 2015, when the first ten episodes were released.

No. overall	No. in season	Title	Directed by	Written by	Original release date
1	1	"Ty and Revvit"	Michael Mullen & Donna Brockopp	Ron Burch & David Kidd	August 14, 2015
Ty the T-Trux befriends a reptool named Revvit and brings together a group of Dinotrux to stand firm against the evil T-Trux, D-Structs.
2	2	"Scrapadactyls"	Donna Brockopp	Steve Altiere	August 14, 2015
When Revvit brings some of his Reptool friends out of the ravine, Ty and the Dinotrux try to save them from a flock of Scrapadactyls.
3	3	"Garage"	Donna Brockopp	Luke Giordano	August 14, 2015
D-Structs and his new minion, a Scraptool named Skrap-It, try to spread discord among Ty and his friends.
4	4	"Scraptors"	Michael Mullen	Ron Burch & David Kidd	August 14, 2015
Ton-Ton is taken by Scraptors and the Trux must save him.
5	5	"Pit"	Donna Brockopp	Jeremy Shipp	August 14, 2015
D-Structs' new plan to get rid of the Dinotrux involves a large sinkhole, but Revvit's intellect complicates this.
6	6	"Garby"	Donna Brockopp	Steve Altiere	August 14, 2015
The Dinotrux welcome a new member, a Stegarbasaurus named Garby, in their construction efforts to keep their food safe. However, he accidentally eats Revvit due to his fondness for rocks and the mishaps leads to them being trapped in D-Structs' cave.
7	7	"Tortools"	Michael Mullen	Luke Giordano	August 14, 2015
A group of newly-hatched Tortools causes trouble for Dozer when they mistake him for their mother.
8	8	"Desert"	Donna Brockopp	Jeremy Shipp	August 14, 2015
Under the orders of D-Structs, Skrap-It steals a part from Garby that enables his mobility, forcing the group to find a replacement in the desert.
9	9	"Sandstorm"	Donna Brockopp	Mimi Hess	August 14, 2015
A sandstorm disables the Dinotrux's mobility and Revvit must solve the problem before Scraptors approach.
10	10	"Fake Ravine"	Michael Mullen	Ron Burch & David Kidd	August 14, 2015
D-Structs and Skrap-It kidnap Click-Clack to force him to tell them where the Reptool Ravine is.

=== Season 2 (2016) ===
The adventures continue with Ty, Revvit, and the rest of the Trux as they make new friends, new enemies and face all new challenges. With danger and mystery around every corner, these half-dinosaur, half-truck and all awesome friends will 'Trux It Up' to build a better world. 13 episodes of the second season were released on Netflix on March 11, 2016.

No. overall	No. in season	Title	Directed by	Written by	Original release date
11	1	"New Tail"	Donna Brockopp	Steve Altiere	March 11, 2016
After the gang saves him, a thankless D-Structs repays them by threatening to saw them to pieces with his new saw tail.
12	2	"Ottos"	Donna Brockopp	Luke Giordano	March 11, 2016
While investigating a meteor crash, the gang encounters a new species of Reptools who are all named Otto.
13	3	"Night"	Donna Brockopp & Michael Mullen	Steve Altiere	March 11, 2016
The Reptools must defend the garage against Scrapadactyls at night after the gang leaves to find Dozer a spare part.
14	4	"Rollodons"	Unknown	Kinan Copen	March 11, 2016
The Dinotrux try to get a band of Rollodons (based on Iguanodon) to solve a problem, but Revvit is anything but thrilled at the plan.
15	5	"Lair"	Unknown	Jeremy Shipp	March 11, 2016
With the help of additional Scraptools, D-Structs steals metal from the crew to improve his new lair and the crew must retrieve it.
16	6	"Battering Ram"	Unknown	Mimi Hess	March 11, 2016
When Ace's new invention is broken, she and Skya must find the culprits before the others get back to the garage.
17	7	"Racetrack"	Unknown	Luke Giordano	March 11, 2016
Ton-Ton's old friends are so wild and crazy to the point of recklessness, that the Dinotrux must try and rein them in.
18	8	"Gluphosaurs"	Unknown	Jeremy Shipp	March 11, 2016
D-Structs and Skrap-It trick a pack of Gluphosaurs (based on Dilophosaurus) into sticking the crew together, forcing Revvit to deal with the problem.
19	9	"Towaconstrictors"	Unknown	Kinan Copen	March 11, 2016
The gang heads through a dark forest that hasn't been entered before to map a shortcut for Ton-Ton, and run into a group of snakes called Towaconstrictors (based on Boa constrictor).
20	10	"Desert Scraptors"	Unknown	Steve Altiere	March 11, 2016
D-Structs leads Ty and his friends into a trap full of Scraptors, but the plan backfires when Click-Clack gains metal horns that cause the Scraptors to dub him their leader.
21	11	"Water"	Unknown	Luke Giordano	March 11, 2016
To battle a drought, the Dinotrux construct an aqueduct connected to a giant pond found by the Tortools but must contend with D-Structs and his minions along the way, especially when the evil T-Trux and Scraptools plans on keeping the water strictly for themselves.
22	12	"Wind"	Unknown	Jeremy Shipp	March 11, 2016
A fierce windstorm forces the gang to stay inside the garage for an unknown amount of time, and things then get heated between Dozer and Ton-Ton.
23	13	"Lightning"	Unknown	Steve Altiere	March 11, 2016
After Skrap-It is struck by lightning, he gains a high IQ, sparking another dastardly scheme to defeat the Dinotrux.

=== Season 3 (2016) ===
As the Dinotrux continue make their community bigger and better, new villains come to challenge Ty, Revvit and the rest of their friends. But with bigger builds, new Dinotrux and Reptools soon to follow, these half-dinosaur, half-construction vehicle and all-awesome friends are more determined than ever to build their way out of any situation. 16 episodes of the third season were released on Netflix on October 7, 2016.

No. overall	No. in season	Title	Directed by	Written by	Original release date
24	1	"Slide"	Unknown	Luke Giordano	October 7, 2016
The Dinotrux decide to make a slide for a shortcut down a Scraptor filled path, but D-Structs and Skrap-It try to sabotage it.
25	2	"Drillasaurs"	Unknown	Jeremy Shipp	October 7, 2016
A herd of Drillasaurs (based on Nodosaurs) is inadvertently causing trouble for the Dinotrux to get diamonds underneath their crater.
26	3	"Volcano"	Unknown	Ron Burch & David Kidd	October 7, 2016
An active volcano threatens to destroy the crater, so the Dinotrux at first decide to leave the crater, but then they get an idea of how to redirect the lava when it erupts, one that D-Structs wishes to prevent.
27	4	"Sawmetradon"	Seung Cha	Ron Burch & David Kidd	October 7, 2016
A band of Reptools seek help to get rid of a nasty and foul-attituded Sawmetradon (based on Dimetrodon) named Splitter that threatens their home.
28	5	"Speed"	Seung Cha	Steve Altiere	October 7, 2016
When Skrap-It removes a bolt from Ty's master cylinder, which forces him to move around without being able to stop, it's up to Ton-Ton to save the day.
29	6	"Flynt"	Seung Cha	Luke Giordano	October 7, 2016
Ty befriends a reclusive Hydrodon (based on Vulcanodon) named Flynt who assists him when the Garage is surrounded by fire.
30	7	"Wings"	Seung Cha	Jeremy Shipp	October 7, 2016
Ton-Ton has ambitions about flying and, needless to say, this puts Ace and the Ottos in danger.
31	8	"Slamtools"	Seung Cha	Steve Altiere	October 7, 2016
When D-Structs gets new minions in the form of hammer-headed tools named Slamtools and uses them to apprehend Ty and his friends, it's up to Click-Clack and Garby to stop the little monsters.
32	9	"Blayde"	Seung Cha	Jeremy Shipp	October 7, 2016
Dozer's former friend, Blayde, is causing trouble for other Dozeratops, and it's up to the gang to put a stop to her cruelty.
33	10	"Battle"	Seung Cha	Luke Giordano	October 7, 2016
After the Dumps bust his original one, Skrap-It puts in a new spark plug for D-Structs and this one gives him more power than ever, forcing the gang to fight fire with fire.
34	11	"Cementasaurs"	Michael Mullen & Dan Riba	Steve Altiere	October 7, 2016
Ty gets trapped by a pair of Cementasaurs (based on Pachycephalosaurus), forcing the Reptools to convince the Cementasaurs to help him out of this mess.
35	12	"Eggs"	Christo B. Stamboliev	Jeremy Shipp	October 7, 2016
An earthquake causes a herd of Ankylodumps to lose its eggs and it's up to Ton-Ton and the others to get them back safely.
36	13	"Pounder"	Christo Stamboliev	Kinan Copen	October 7, 2016
A Poundersaurolophus (based on Parasaurolophus) begins pounding everything in sight and it's up to the Dinotrux to stop this pounding menace.
37	14	"Shockarachnids"	Michael Mullen & Dan Riba	Steve Altiere	October 7, 2016
Skya and Dozer are attacked by Shockarachnids (based on Mesothelae) after taking a shortcut through the woods.
38	15	"Scaretrux"	Christo Stamboliev	Luke Giordano	October 7, 2016
The Reptools build a giant T-Trux model called a Scaretrux to scare Scraptors away, but Skrap-It and his gang decide to steal it for D-Structs.
39	16	"Magnet Mountain"	Christo Stamboliev	Jeremy Shipp	October 7, 2016
D-Structs (along with Blade, Splitter and Pounder) has trapped the Trux and Reptools in a magnetic mountain cave, and Revvit must find a way to free them.

=== Season 4 (2017) ===
With new trux, new locations and new responsibilities, Ty and the trux will have their work cut out for them, but nothing will stop these guys from protecting their community, battling the forces of evil and, most importantly, building a better world. So get ready for more action, new friends and new challenges, 'cause it's time to Trux it up!

No. overall	No. in season	Title	Directed by	Written by	Original release date
40	1	"Pteracopters"	David Schwartz	Steve Altiere	March 31, 2017
When a flock of Pteracopters (based on Quetzalcoatlus) crash-lands in the crater, the Dinotrux help them rescue a member who's been taken down by stealth Scrapadactyls.
41	2	"Snowblazer"	Christo Stamboliev	Jeremy Shipp	March 31, 2017
While trying to get home from a snowy area north of their crater, the gang meets a lonely but helpful Trux named Snowblazer, a Plowasaur (based on Chasmosaurus) who helps them navigate the terrain.
42	3	"Picktools"	Michael Mullen & Dan Riba	Luke Giordano	March 31, 2017
When the crew gets stuck on a sheet of thin ice, they run into a group of Picktools, which appear to be trying to crack the ice around them.
43	4	"Ton-Ton & Skrap-It"	Dan Riba	Luke Giordano	March 31, 2017
After fighting gets them stuck in a dangerous situation, enemies Skrap-It and Ton-Ton must join forces to save themselves.
44	5	"Garby's Gang"	Christo Stamboliev	Jeremy Shipp	March 31, 2017
Garby has to develop confidence as a leader when he's left in charge of the Flatirons while Ty and the others are stuck far away from home.
45	6	"Gearwigs"	David Schwartz	Steve Altiere	March 31, 2017
Click-Clack climbs out of his comfort zone to make sure his ideas are heard when the Dinotrux hatch a plan to stop D-Structs and his minions from stealing supplies.
46	7	"Bridge"	Michael Mullen	Luke Giordano	March 31, 2017
A group of Trux displaced by a volcano comes to Ty for help, and the gang has to work together to build a bridge to welcome the newcomers.

=== Season 5 (2017) ===
Picking up where things left off from last season, Ty and the gang have dozens of new trux to transition into their ever-growing community, but nothing could have prepared him for the challenges ahead. Still, with his friends by his side and new dangers to contend with, Ty will always be ready to Trux it up, even against a new Trux that even he can't stop alone.

No. overall	No. in season	Title	Directed by	Written by	Original release date
47	1	"Imposters"	David Schwartz	Ron Burch & David Kidd	August 18, 2017
D-Structs disguises himself as Ty to fool the other Trux in the crater to do his dirty work while his minions separate Ty and the gang to avoid interference.
48	2	"Aquadons"	David Schwartz	Steve Altiere	August 18, 2017
After being sent over the chasm by D-Structs and his gang, Ty and his friends are marooned on an island where they decide to build a raft to help them get home. Along the way, they encounter a few sea creatures - clam-like bivalves, flashlight-like fish and Aquadons (based on Liopleurodon).
49	3	"The Return"	Pete Jacobs	Jeremy Shipp	August 18, 2017
When the Dinotrux make it back to the crater, they discover that D-Structs and his minions have turned it into a fortress for themselves, and they must think of a plan to take back their home.
50	4	"Junktools"	Michael Mullen	Mimi Hess	August 18, 2017
After taking shelter from a sandstorm in the desert, the crew discover that some of their crucial parts have been taken by desert-dwelling bipedal Tools named Junktools (based on Compsognathus), who merely want to protect their home from desert Scraptors.
51	5	"Dreadtrux Part. 1"	Dan Riba	Steve Altiere	August 18, 2017
Ty and his friends discover a legendary Dinotrux, a Dreadtrux (based on Dreadnoughtus) hibernating in a small mountain, and try to relocate it to protect the crater.
52	6	"Dreadtrux Part. 2"	Unknown	Ron Burch & David Kidd	August 18, 2017
When the Dreadtrux wakes up from its hibernation and goes on a rampage, D-Structs is forced to put aside his pride to help Ty stop the monster and save both himself and the lands.

=== Season 6: Supercharged (2017) ===
Sometime after the previous season, Ty and the Trux are back and thanks to a hive of Superchargers, they're ready to have more Supercharged fun, build new Supercharged things and battle new Supercharged enemies. So prepare yourselves for some Supercharged action because it's time to Super-Trux it up!

No. overall	No. in season	Title	Directed by	Written by	Original release date
53	1	"Superchargers"	Steve Trenbirth	David Kidd & Ron Burch	November 10, 2017
When the Dinotrux discover a batch of special bugs that will supercharge their abilities, they must figure out how to use the new power responsibly while building a light tower.
54	2	"Super Scraptors"	Dan Riba	Steve Altiere	November 10, 2017
After Skrap-It steals the Dinotrux's supply of superchargers and accidentally spills them, the crater is overrun by an army of Super Scraptors, forcing Ton-Ton to face his Scraptor fear.
55	3	"Diamond Bit"	Steve Trenbirth	Jeremy Shipp	November 10, 2017
Ty gets stuck in a Shockarachnid web, forcing Revvit and Click-Clack to head off on a high-steaks journey to find a bit made out of diamonds that can cut him loose.
56	4	"Shootout"	Pete Jacobs	Luke Giordano	November 10, 2017
Garby accidentally eats too many superchargers, turning him into a jittery mess. But his hyperactive state might help fend off some Scrapadactyls.
57	5	"Downshift"	Pete Jacobs	Kinan Copan	November 10, 2017
When one of Dozer' s gaskets is blown and he overheats, he has to work hard not to lose his temper as the other Dinotrux help get him to mineral baths with healing properties. D-Structs, however, has other ideas.
58	6	"Xee"	Dan Riba	Steve Altiere	November 10, 2017
A storm blows Revvit, Click-Clack and Waldo to a forest far away from home, where they befriend a resourceful tool named Xee who lives in solitude.

=== Season 7: Supercharged (2018) ===
Ty and the gang find that things are getting easier with the use of Superchargers. But the challenges ahead will force them to use special Modifications in order to fight off New enemies and solve some truly unique problems, including rock climbing, racing and spy gadgets. Once again it's Time to Trux it up.

No. overall	No. in season	Title	Directed by	Written by	Original release date
59	1	"D-Stroy"	Steve Trenbirth	Steve Altiere	March 23, 2018
Dozer takes it personally when Skya thinks his idea won't work. D-Structs' plan to hoard all the superchargers leads him to a reunion with his equally-mean, intelligent, older brother, D-Stroy.
60	2	"Doom Run"	Dan Riba	Jeremy Shipp	March 23, 2018
With Skya ailing, the Dinotrux must face off with a group of hostile trux called the Speed Trux in a dangerous "Doom Race" to win the part that will fix her.
61	3	"Goldtrux"	Steve Trenbirth	Steve Altiere	March 23, 2018
Waldo impresses the crater with his special new multi-tool, but a greedy, gold-obsessed Stegarbasaurus wants the tool for himself and kidnaps Waldo.
62	4	"Cliffhanger"	Pete Jacobs	Jeremy Shipp	March 23, 2018
When the Pteracopters locate a huge ore deposit, they need Skya's help to get it out, and Click-Clack worries that nobody trusts him to do a good job.
63	5	"Magnodozer"	Mark Sonntag	Luke Giordano	March 23, 2018
The Dinotrux discover a canyon that's full of superchargers, but they'll need all of Dozer's power to clear a path they can fit through.
64	6	"Liftasaurs"	Dan Riba	Luke Giordano	March 23, 2018
When the Dinotrux go to the edge of the crater to find some supplies, they get caught in a ruthless feud between competing herds of Liftasaurs (based on Corythosaurus).
65	7	"Bad Build"	Steve Trenbirth	Steve Altiere	March 23, 2018
D-Stroy pops in on D-Structs and proposes a plan to defeat the Dinotrux, and, for the first and only time ever, Ty's "trux it up" response might not be enough to handle them both.

=== Season 8: Supercharged (2018) ===
After having been driven out of the crater by D-Structs, his older brother D-Stroy and their enslaved and abused Dreadtrux, Ty and the Gang now have to stage a rebellion from the Hidden Forest, living the lives of Renegades as they work together to liberate the crater from their enemies.

No. overall	No. in season	Title	Directed by	Written by	Original release date
66	1	"Renegades"	Dan Riba	David Kidd & Ron Burch	August 3, 2018
Ty and his friends build a new, covert location to plan on how to take the crater back from D-Structs and D-Stroy.
67	2	"Dyscrapadons"	Mark Sonntag	Mimi Hess	August 3, 2018
Flapjaw the Pteracopter is stuck in the air with infant Dyscrapadons (based on Dimorphodon) bothering him, forcing the gang, especially a Pteracopter-biased Xee to help.
68	3	"Opposites"	Steve Trenbirth	Kinan Copen	August 3, 2018
With Skrap-It on look-out for the D-Bros, the Dinotrux get help from a group of doppelgangers.
69	4	"Drillipedes"	Dan Riba	Jeremy Shipp	August 3, 2018
In order to get the Dinotrux some parts without any interference from Break-It, the Reptools go underground and use their old supply tunnels, but eventually find themselves in a territorial dispute when they run into a colony of Drillipedes (based on Arthropleura).
70	5	"Part Kart"	Mark Sonntag	Luke Giordano	August 3, 2018
The gang invent a portable mobile unit to take with them in order to repair any Dinotrux the D-Bros have attacked and harassed and Skya tries to help a timid Hydrodon named Frytzz believe in himself.
71	6	"Crabcavator"	Steve Trenbirth	Steve Altiere	August 3, 2018
In order to repair Click-Clack's tongue after it is damaged by a Washer Wasp, the gang go underwater to retrieve a Platinum Pearl but must contend with an eccentric Crabcavator named Kepler who wants to use the pearls to make a new protective shell for himself.
72	7	"Anklyodump Games"	Dan Riba	Jeremy Shipp	August 3, 2018
Ton-Ton's ambition to compete in the Ankylodump Games threatens to expose him to the D-Bros.
73	8	"Scraptool Apprentice"	Mark Sonntag	Luke Giordano	August 3, 2018
Skrap-It supercharges himself and his fellow Scraptools in order to gather all the scrap around, but when they turn against him, it's up to Revvit and Click-Clack to remedy the situation.
74	9	"Silent Trux"	Steve Trenbirth	Steve Altiere	August 3, 2018
Upon eating ore covered in pollen, the Dinotrux end up losing their voices and Garby must help them fix this while Skrap-It ends up in a similar plight with the D-Bros.
75	10	"Shredadon"	Dan Riba	Mimi Hess	August 3, 2018
When Ton-Ton accidentally blows out the camouflaged base's door down, the gang goes the Outlands to find a replacement where they encounter a new aggressive Trux called a Shredadon (based on Suchomimus or Baryonyx).
76	11	"Lil' Dread"	Mark Sonntag	Luke Giordano	August 3, 2018
Ton-Ton befriends an infant Dreadtrux, that he decides to adopt and names Lil' Dread, but after his friends convince him otherwise, he tries to save the baby when the D-Bros abduct him.
77	12	"Ore Hunt"	Steve Trenbirth	Steve Altiere	August 3, 2018
When the D-Bros eventually run out of the Dreadtrux's favorite type of ore; purple ore, which they've been using to control it with, the gang try to find some more first in order to lead it away from D-Structs and D-Stroy so that they have a better chance at defeating them, but things get complicated when part of their plan has Garby eat the ore and it ends up jamming his systems.
78	13	"Ty vs. D-Structs"	Dan Riba	David Kidd & Ron Burch	August 3, 2018
Ty and his friends band together for the ultimate showdown between D-Structs, D-Stroy, and Skrap-It that soon leads to every Trux and Tool they've ever befriended to back them up.
