= Dinotrux =

2015 American children's television series

- Promotional artwork
- Also known as: Dinotrux Supercharged (seasons 6–8)
- Genre: Action-adventure; Comedy; Science fiction
- Based on: Dinotrux by Chris Gall
- Showrunners: David Kidd; Ron Burch
- Voices of: Andrew Francis; Richard Ian Cox; Ashleigh Ball; Matt Hill; Brian Drummond; Paul Dobson; Trevor Devall; Fred Ewanuick; Cree Summer; Doron Bell; Heather Doerksen; Brian Dobson; Kelly Sheridan
- Theme music composer: Robert Persaud; Mireilla Kut
- Composer: Jake Monaco
- Country of origin: United States
- Original language: English
- No. of seasons: 8
- No. of episodes: 78

Production
- Executive producers: Jeff DeGrandis; David Kidd; Ron Burch
- Running time: 23 minutes
- Production company: DreamWorks Animation Television

Original release
- Network: Netflix
- Release: August 14, 2015 – August 3, 2018

Dinotrux is an American animated television series based on Chris Gall's series of books by the same name. It features a fictional prehistoric world inhabited by hybrid characters that are part animal and part machine. Originally DreamWorks Animation had the intention to develop a film, but later decided to create a television series. From season six and onwards, it was known as Dinotrux Supercharged. The show was later removed from Netflix, and a birthday celebration spinoff short was also removed months later.

Keith Uhlich said the dialogue was "pun–laden", with the moral being that friends can take various forms. Said to be similar to Dinosaucers, it is noted for being a continuation of a post-war period sentient machines trope. The mechanics of the show were noted to be realistic. It was nominated for two Annie Awards, one Leo Awards, and seven Daytime Emmy Awards, winning two.

== Premise ==
In the world of Dinotrux, the creatures usually stay in herds within their species, or by themselves. They do not build structures either. However, the Dinotrux, which are machines modeled after dinosaurus, Ty-Rux, Dozer, Skya, and Ton–Ton work together with reptools, reptiles modeled after mechanical tools, Revvit, Click–Clack, Waldo, and Ace, to encourage cooperation and construction. To build, or repair, their projects they need various materials. This results in the crew going to different fictional locations. While journeying, they meet new trux and trux species. Some of these are friendly, while others are hostile towards the protagonists. D-Structs, the show's main antagonist, tries to destroy their cooperation and their buildings. This results in them using the help of other characters, outside of the main cast, to defeat him. Although he had initially despised teamwork, D-Structs reluctantly works with other trux in the later seasons, in an attempt to use the other trux to defeat the main protagonists.

== Characters ==
- Ty-Rux (voiced by Andrew Francis) is the leader of the Dinotrux. He is a red Tyrannosaurus Trux — half-Tyrannosaurus and half-excavator.
- Revvit (voiced by Richard Ian Cox) is a yellow and green Rotilian Reptool — half-lizard (resembling a chameleon) and half-rotary drill. He is Ty's best friend.
- Dozer (voiced by Brian Drummond) is a yellow Dozeratops — half-Triceratops and half-bulldozer. He is described as a "cranky hothead" but a true friend with a big heart.
- Ton-Ton (voiced by Matt Hill) is a blue Ankylodump — half-Ankylosaurus and half-dump truck. He is described as a daredevil who "is always ready for non-stop action and loves to tear it up".
- Skya (voiced by Ashleigh Ball) is an orange Craneosaur — half Brachiosaurus and half construction crane.
- Garby (voiced by Trevor Devall) is a green Stegarbasaurus — half-Stegosaurus and half-garbage truck. He enjoys eating rocks.
- Click-Clack (voiced by Fred Ewanuick) is an orange Rotilian Reptool — half-lizard (resembling a chameleon) and half-rotary drill.
- D-Structs (voiced by Paul Dobson) is a white and black-colored Tyrannosaurus Trux — half-Tyrannosaurus rex and half-excavator, who serves as the main antagonist.

== Episodes ==
During the course of the series, 78 episodes of Dinotrux were released over eight seasons, concluding on August 3, 2018.

| Season | Subtitle | Episodes | Originally released |
|---|---|---|---|
| 1 | —N/a | 10 | August 14, 2015 |
| 2 | —N/a | 13 | March 11, 2016 |
| 3 | —N/a | 16 | October 7, 2016 |
| 4 | —N/a | 7 | March 31, 2017 |
| 5 | —N/a | 6 | August 18, 2017 |
| 6 | Supercharged | 6 | November 10, 2017 |
| 7 | Supercharged | 7 | March 23, 2018 |
| 8 | Supercharged | 13 | August 3, 2018 |

=== Season 1 (2015) ===
Season one released on August 14, 2015, featuring ten episodes.

=== Season 2 (2016) ===
Season two released on March 11, 2016, featuring thirteen episodes.

=== Season 3 (2016) ===
Season three released on October 7, 2016, featuring sixteen episodes.

=== Season 4 (2017) ===
Season four released on March 31, 2017, featuring seven episodes.

=== Season 5 (2017) ===
Season five released on August 18, 2017, featuring six episodes.

=== Season 6: Supercharged (2017) ===
Season six released on November 10, 2017, featuring six episodes.

=== Season 7: Supercharged (2018) ===
Season seven released on March 23, 2018, featuring seven episodes.

=== Season 8: Supercharged (2018) ===
Season eight released on August 3, 2018, featuring thirteen episodes.

== Production and release ==
DreamWorks Animation first optioned rights to Dinotrux, short for "dinosaurus truck", in March 2009, for approximately half a million dollars. This was a month before the first book was published, and they had an intention to develop a computer-animated film.

Dinotrux: Supercharged, a continuation of the original Dinotrux show, left Netflix on August 3, 2024. Dinotrux: Happy Birthday To You! left on October 26, 2024. An article from What's on Netflix speculated that this removal was a part of DreamWorks shows being removed, as Netflix's exclusive rights on them expire. Dinotrux: Supercharged no longer offers any official means to watch it, although some of the removed shows were put on Peacock. It is unclear why Dinotrux: Supercharged was removed before the main series, which is predicted by What's on Netflix to stay at least until January 1, 2028.

The Arabic-language DreamWorks Channel showed Dinotrux on their programming.

== Reception, themes and analysis ==
Keith Uhlich from The Hollywood Reporter compared Dinotrux to Dinosaucers, noting the similarity in concept, idea, and characters. He considered the moral of "friends come in all shapes and sizes", to be "treacly", as the initial episodes mostly had smashing, followed by a short insert of morals. He called the dialogue "pun-laden", and Uhlich thought it worked well as an advertisement for toys. The authors of the book Writing for Animation say that, even though Dinotrux is entirely fantastical, the mechanics of the show is very realistic. They point out that there are no "extreme sound effects" or comical visual jokes. A paper published in the Technology and Culture section of the Johns Hopkins University Press notes that Dinotrux, among other shows, is an adaptation of the impulsive and unpredictable construction machine trope, common in the post-war period. However, a key difference in the modern adaptation is that the humanoid machines do not have operators.

=== Awards ===
| Award | Year | Category | Recipient(s) | Result | Ref. |
|---|---|---|---|---|---|
| Daytime Emmy Awards | 2016 | Outstanding Sound Mixing – Animation | Devon Bowman, D.J. Lynch, Rob McIntyre and Aran Tanchum | Nominated | |
| Daytime Emmy Awards | 2016 | Outstanding Individual in Animation | Chad Weatherford | Won | |
| Daytime Emmy Awards | 2016 | Outstanding Sound Editing – Animation | Devon Bowman, Vincent Guisetti, Rob McIntyre, Shawn Bohonos, Jessey Drake, Andrew Ing, Marc Schmidt and Aran Tanchum | Nominated | |
| Daytime Emmy Awards | 2017 | Outstanding Sound Mixing in a Preschool Animated Program | Roberto D. Alegria, Devon G. Bowman, Alex Hall, Rob McIntyre, DJ Lynch | Nominated | |
| Daytime Emmy Awards | 2017 | Outstanding Sound Editing in a Preschool Animated Program | Andrew Ing, DJ Lynch, Marc Schmidt, Roberto D. Alegria, Devon G. Bowman, Alfredo Douglas, Rob McIntyre, Monique Reymond, Shawn Bohonos | Won | |
| Daytime Emmy Awards | 2018 | Outstanding Sound Editing in a Preschool Animated Program | Dinotrux (Netflix) | Nominated | |
| Daytime Emmy Awards | 2018 | Outstanding Sound Mixing in a Preschool Animated Program | Dinotrux (Netflix) | Nominated | |
| Leo Awards | 2018 | Best Voice Performance Animationi Program or Series | Heather Doerksen: Dinotrux - Snowblazer | Nominated | |
| Annie Awards | 2018 | Editorial in an Animated Television / Broadcast Production | William Rinaldi, Justin Baker | Nominated | |
| Annie Awards | 2019 | Best Animated Television/Broadcast Production for Preschool Children | Dinotrux: Supercharged for Episode: Crabcavator | Nominated | |

== Merchandising ==
Since 2015, Mattel has produced a line of die-cast vehicles and playsets based on Dinotrux, under a master toy license covering the series.
