= Hearth's Warming Eve =

- My Little Pony: Friendship Is Magic episode
- Commander Hurricane (depicted by Rainbow Dash, left), Chancellor Puddinghead (Pinkie Pie, center), and Princess Platinum (Rarity, right) argue over who found the new land first.
- Episode no.: Season 2 Episode 11
- Written by: Merriwether Williams
- Original air date: December 17, 2011
- Running time: 22 minutes

Episode chronology
← Previous "Secret of My Excess"	Next → "Family Appreciation Day"
- My Little Pony: Friendship Is Magic season 2

"Hearth's Warming Eve" is the eleventh episode of the second season of the animated television series My Little Pony: Friendship Is Magic. The episode was written by Merriwether Williams. It originally aired on The Hub on December 17, 2011. In this episode, the Mane Six perform in a holiday pageant that tells the origin story of Hearth's Warming Eve and how the three pony tribes came together to found Equestria. It is also the first Christmas episode of the fourth generation.

== Plot ==
External videos
- Hearth's Warming Eve (full episode) — Official upload of the episode onto YouTube

The Mane Six star in a special pageant chronicling Equestria's founding at the Canterlot palace theater.

The story unfolds in an ancient era when three separate pony races maintain an uneasy alliance based on mutual necessity: earth ponies cultivate crops, pegasi control weather patterns, and unicorns manage celestial cycles. This fragile cooperation is shattered when a devastating winter storm creates widespread food shortages, which prompts the tribal chieftains to meet for emergency negotiations. Princess Platinum of the unicorns (depicted by Rarity), Commander Hurricane of the pegasi (Rainbow Dash), and Chancellor Puddinghead of the earth ponies (depicted by Pinkie Pie) each harbor deep suspicions about the other groups, and their summit devolves into bitter accusations.

Convinced that separation offered the only path forward, each leader embarks on an expedition with their most trusted advisor to locate suitable territory for their people alone. The three groups travel through harsh conditions until they separately discover what appeared to be ideal settlements. Commander Hurricane claims mountainous terrain for "Pegasopolis", Princess Platinum stakes out mineral-rich highlands as "Unicornia", and Chancellor Puddinghead selects fertile lowlands dubbed "Earth." However, their satisfaction turn to outrage when they realize all three expeditions had converged on precisely the same location.

As the leaders renew their hostilities, the mysterious blizzard mysteriously manifests at their newfound refuge, forcing everyone to seek shelter within a cave where the arguments continue. Supernatural ice spirits called Windigos materialize overhead, revealing themselves as the source of the endless winter, as creatures that feed on fighting, hatred and discord between the tribes. While the stubborn leaders become frozen solid by their own animosity, their loyal advisors recognize that only genuine friendship could break the curse. Their warming bond generates a brilliant flame (called the "Fire of Friendship") that banishes the windigos and melt the supernatural ice. With the storm finally ends, the humbled tribes agree to establish a unified nation called Equestria where all ponies could flourish together.

The pageant ends with the Mane Six joining the audience in singing a carol ("The Heart Carol").

== Reception ==
Sherilyn Connelly, the author of Ponyville Confidential, gave the episode an "A" rating. In her review of the episode in SF Weekly, Connelly praised Princess Celestia's absence from the story and noted that the pageant was not about any "prophesized messianic figure coming to offer salvation." She made several cultural references throughout her review, comparing the episode's transition from stage production to reality to Michael Powell and Emeric Pressburger's film The Red Shoes, and likening Spike's role as narrator to a Henry V reference. Connelly emphasized the episode's central moral, writing that "the operating principle of pony society" is "Live together or die" and that "Magic will not save you, and any supernatural beings in the sky are ones that wish you harm." She concluded her review by paraphrasing Kurt Vonnegut, stating that the episode delivers one of the most important lessons: "God damn it, you've got to be kind," calling it "harsh, but it also happens to be true."

Anime Superhero News called the episode "a great episode on its own merits" and praised its solid characters and attention to detail. However, the review expressed disappointment that the episode did not embrace the Christmas season sufficiently and felt that "potential was squandered this year for a truly awesome Christmas-themed episode."

Raymond Gallant of Freakin' Awesome Network gave the episode a rating of 6.5 out of 10 and called it "good, but not great." He praised the detailed history and world-building but criticized the episode for feeling rushed and noted his disappointment that "we never really got to see how Hearth's Warming works as a holiday" beyond the founding story.

Republibot described "Hearth's Warming Eve" as "a solid episode, but not an inspired one." The reviewer praised Merriwether Williams' improved writing compared to her previous episode ("The Mysterious Mare Do Well") and the introduction of wendigos, but criticized the ending carol ("The Heart Carol") as his least favorite song from the series and expressed frustration over the lack of information about the princesses' backstory.

== Home media release ==
The episode was part of the Season 2 DVD set, released by Shout Factory on May 14, 2013.

== See also ==
- List of My Little Pony: Friendship Is Magic episodes
