= Secret of My Excess =

- My Little Pony: Friendship Is Magic episode
- Spike (left), now a full-sized dragon, grabs Rarity (right).
- Episode no.: Season 2 Episode 10
- Written by: M.A. Larson
- Original air date: December 10, 2011
- Running time: 22 minutes

Episode chronology
← Previous "Sweet and Elite"	Next → "Hearth's Warming Eve"
- My Little Pony: Friendship Is Magic season 2

"Secret of My Excess" is the tenth episode of the second season of the animated television series My Little Pony: Friendship Is Magic. The episode was written by M.A. Larson. It originally aired on The Hub on December 10, 2011. In this episode, Spike celebrates his first birthday in Ponyville and receives many gifts from his friends, but this triggers a dangerous hoarding instinct that causes him to grow into a giant dragon and threaten the town.

== Plot ==
External videos
- Secret of My Excess (full episode) — Official upload of the episode onto YouTube

At the Golden Oak Library, Spike proudly displays a fire ruby he has carefully aged for months as a special treat for his approaching birthday. When Rarity visits to borrow a fashion book and becomes captivated by the spectacular gem, Spike abandons his original plan to eat it and instead offers the ruby as a gift, which delights Rarity so much that she kisses his cheek before departing. During his birthday celebration with the Mane Six, Rarity reveals she has incorporated the ruby into an elegant necklace and used Spike's generous gesture as inspiration for designing new capes, while the abundance of presents from his friends fills Spike with excitement and a desire for the festivities to continue indefinitely.

After receiving more gifts from the Cakes and an encounter with Cheerilee who offers him a hat, Spike begins actively approaching other ponies around town to request birthday presents. The following morning, Spike awakens significantly larger and more gangly, and he displays an obsessive compulsion to collect and hoard various objects. Consultations with local doctors prove fruitless until Zecora diagnoses the problem as dragon greed—a condition where accumulating possessions triggers physical growth—but Spike escapes with her belongings before they can intervene.

Spike's transformations accelerate as he rampages through Ponyville, growing progressively larger with each hoarding episode until he reaches enormous proportions and begins terrorizing the entire town. His destructive spree culminates when he snatches Rarity from her boutique and carries her through the streets despite desperate rescue attempts by the other ponies and even the Wonderbolts. However, when Rarity's torn cape exposes the fire ruby necklace during his rampage, the sight triggers Spike's memory of giving her that precious gift, instantly reversing his growth and returning him to normal size just before he and Rarity plummet toward the ground.

Rainbow Dash and Fluttershy safely catch the falling pair, and Spike surveys the widespread destruction he caused and becomes overwhelmed with remorse. Rarity praises his ability to overcome the greed and gives him another affectionate kiss. Spike learns that the joy of giving meaningful gifts to those you care about far surpasses the temporary satisfaction of receiving them and writes a friendship report to Princess Celestia.

== Reception ==
Sherilyn Connelly, the author of Ponyville Confidential, gave the episode a "C+" rating. In her review of the episode in SF Weekly, Connelly noted the parallel to the previous episode ("Sweet and Elite") in that both episodes feature characters who "struggle with who they are, and who they want to be."

In a critical analysis of the episode, author Jen A. Blue described "Secret of My Excess" as "one of Season 2's frontrunners for worst episode" and wrote that it has a bad reputation among fans for being boring. Blue criticized the episode's exploration of what she called "biology-as-destiny", arguing that it problematically suggests a person's nature and actions are primarily determined by biological factors rather than environment and choice. She analyzed Spike's transformation as problematic gender representation and identified what she called "Sitcom Sexism" that simultaneously depicts men negatively while suggesting their behavior isn't their fault, which places the burden on women to civilize them. Blue wrote that the episode implies Spike's biology prevents him from maturing while retaining his intelligence and pony-like personality. However, Blue also offered an alternative redemptive reading in which Spike represents a corporation that starts small and personable but must pursue greed to grow, eventually becoming a callous entity that tramples individuals without malice. Blue concluded that while this corporate reading could work as a primer on capitalism's problems for children, it was obtuse, and the toxic gender-based interpretation remained more accessible.

Anime Superhero News called the episode "great" and praised its superb characters, humor, and entertainment value. However, the review criticized the episode for using an overly clichéd King Kong parody that the reviewer felt was too frequently done.

Raymond Gallant of Freakin' Awesome Network gave the episode a rating of 9 out of 10 and called it "one of the best episodes to come out of the show yet." He praised the episode as providing much-needed redemption for Spike's character and complimented its perfect blend of action, comedy, and adventure, though he criticized the quick resolution of the ending, which he called "a bit terrible".

== Home media release ==
The episode was part of the Season 2 DVD set, released by Shout Factory on May 14, 2013.

== See also ==
- List of My Little Pony: Friendship Is Magic episodes
