= Ron Burch =

American writer

Ron Burch is an American writer of television, film, plays, short fiction and novels. His movies include Head over Heels, Yours, Mine and Ours and Ferdinand. He was the executive producer/showrunner (along with David Kidd) of the DreamWorks Animation TV show Dinotrux. He and Kidd wrote the second, third, and fourth seasons of "Marvel Super Hero Adventures".

== Early life ==
Ron Burch was born in Columbus, Ohio. His family later moved to Sunbury, Ohio. He attended Ohio State University, Antioch University Los Angeles, and the Institute for Advanced Theater Training at Harvard University.

== Hollywood ==
While living in New York City, Burch and his writing partner, David Kidd, began writing together. They relocated to Los Angeles, where they worked as Staff Writers on the Tom Selleck sitcom The Closer for CBS. In 1998, they, along with composer Ed Alton, were nominated for an Emmy for "Outstanding Music and Lyrics" for the song "You Don't Know Jack." In the 2000s, the duo began working in film and received screen credit on Ferdinand, Head Over Heels and Yours, Mine and Ours. He then worked as an executive producer on DreamWorks Animation's Dinotrux. In addition to Ferdinand being nominated for an Academy Award, the Annie Award, the Golden Globe Award and several others, Burch, along with his co-writers, won the "Humanitas Award" for "Feature--Family."

== Fiction ==
Burch was nominated for a Pushcart Prize for his story "The Flower Pot" in Juked, Issue 6, February 1, 2009. His novel, BLISS INC, was published by BlazeVox Books in 2010. His story "I Need" appeared in the anthology TOO MUCH: Tales of Excess (Chuck Howe and Bud Smith, editors)

== Plays ==
Burch's 10-minute plays, "The Baby," "The Origin of Lewis Hackett," and "Polly," were named Best 10-Minute Play in 2011, 2014, and 2015, respectively. His 10-minute play, "Romeo and Jules," appears in the Best of Playground 2013: Los Angeles.
