= Baby Cakes (My Little Pony: Friendship Is Magic) =

- My Little Pony: Friendship Is Magic episode
- Pinkie Pie (right) unsuccessfully tries to serve food to Pound Cake (left) and Pumpkin Cake (center).
- Episode no.: Season 2 Episode 13
- Written by: Charlotte Fullerton
- Original air date: January 14, 2012
- Running time: 22 minutes

Episode chronology
← Previous "Family Appreciation Day"	Next → "The Last Roundup"
- My Little Pony: Friendship Is Magic season 2

"Baby Cakes" is the thirteenth episode of the second season of the animated television series My Little Pony: Friendship Is Magic. The episode was written by Charlotte Fullerton. It originally aired on The Hub on January 14, 2012. In this episode, Pinkie Pie volunteers to babysit Mr. and Mrs. Cake's newborn twins, Pound Cake and Pumpkin Cake, but she discovers that caring for babies is more challenging than she expected.

== Plot ==
External videos
- Baby Cakes (full episode) — Official upload of the episode onto YouTube

The Mane Six visit the Ponyville hospital to meet Mr. and Mrs. Cake's newly arrived twin foals, Pound Cake and Pumpkin Cake.

A month later, the Cakes face a crisis when they suddenly remember a major catering deadline and desperately need a babysitter to complete their work. When everyone else proves unavailable, they have no choice but to entrust their foals to Pinkie Pie's care. Mrs. Cake provides an extensive instruction list before departing.

Pinkie's optimistic confidence quickly crumbles as the twins use their magical abilities in increasingly chaotic ways. Pound Cake uses his developing wings to fly around the ceiling, and Pumpkin Cake uses telekinesis to manipulate toys and household objects. Every conventional childcare approach backfires spectacularly, from feeding attempts that result in food fights to bath time disasters that flood the bathroom, forcing Pinkie to rely on slapstick flour accidents as her only reliable method for calming the babies.

Twilight Sparkle arrives at Sugarcube Corner, offering assistance, and suggests that some ponies simply lack the temperament for such demanding responsibilities. Pinkie's pride compels her to turn her down. However, her situation deteriorates further as the Cake babies escape their crib and create absolute pandemonium throughout the house, ultimately overwhelming Pinkie to the point of tearful breakdown. The twins notice her distress and spontaneously recreate the flour comedy routine that Pinkie had performed previously.

Mr. and Mrs. Cake return to find their home surprisingly pristine and their children peacefully sleeping. Impressed, they offer Pinkie a permanent babysitting position, although she initially declines it. However, she hears the twins murmuring her name as they are asleep, and the episode ends with her saying that she has some free time next Tuesday to babysit them again.

== Reception ==
Sherilyn Connelly, the author of Ponyville Confidential, gave the episode a "B" rating. In her review of the episode in SF Weekly, Connelly described the episode as "essentially a horror story" and noted its use of horror homage elements, and wrote that it was Friendship Is Magic's "first downer ending."

In a critical analysis of the episode, author Jen A. Blue called "Baby Cakes" "very entertaining" and described it as "a terrifying warning against unpreparedly accepting responsibility for children." Blue positioned the episode within Season 2's thematic exploration of relationships between past, present, and future; she argued that children symbolize both because they represent ancestors in their features and remind adults of their own childhoods while also signifying the future they will inherit. She analyzed how the episode references numerous past episodes in a transformative manner, and described this as a postmodern technique of hybridization where "the past recurs not as a fragment to be repeated, but fully absorbed and transformed." Blue noted that unlike a clip show that says "this is the past" or a formulaic show that says "this is new," this episode "repeats the past while saying 'this is different now than it was then.'" However, Blue identified Pinkie's crying at the end of the episode as somewhat problematic because it potentially reinforces the stereotype that women use tears manipulatively, calling this "a troubling note in an otherwise enjoyable episode."

Raymond Gallant of Freakin' Awesome Network gave the episode a rating of 8.5 out of 10 and called it "another excellent episode of a quality season." He praised the slapstick humor and the adorableness of the Cake twins, noting that the show's creators improved the foals' designs compared to those from "The Mysterious Mare Do Well". Republibot noted that the fan reaction to "Baby Cakes" was generally positive, though few called it their favorite episode. Brendan Kachel of flayrah wrote that "the two baby ponies in this episode are annoying", but that this was the point; the lesson Pinkie Pie had to learn was that some things that need to be done are not always going to be fun.

== Home media release ==
The episode was part of the Season 2 DVD set, released by Shout Factory on May 14, 2013.

== See also ==
- List of My Little Pony: Friendship Is Magic episodes
