= Shining Armor =

Fictional character from My Little Pony

- My Little Pony character
- Shining Armor as he appears in "The One Where Pinkie Pie Knows"
- First appearance: "A Canterlot Wedding" (2012)
- Created by: Meghan McCarthy
- Voiced by: Andrew Francis

In-universe information
- Nickname: BBBFF (Big Brother Best Friend Forever)
- Species: Unicorn
- Title: Ruler of the Crystal Empire
- Occupation: Prince consort; Captain of the Canterlot Royal Guard (formerly)
- Affiliation: Canterlot Royal Guard; Crystal Empire; Equestrian Royal Family
- Family: Twilight Sparkle (younger sister); Twilight Velvet (mother); Night Light (father); Spike (adoptive younger brother)
- Spouse: Princess Cadance
- Children: Flurry Heart (daughter)
- Relatives: Princess Celestia (in-laws); Princess Luna (in-laws)

Prince Shining Armor is a fictional character who appears in the fourth incarnation of Hasbro's My Little Pony toyline and media franchise, beginning with My Little Pony: Friendship Is Magic (2010–2019). He first appears in the second season finale as a major character and serves as a recurring character throughout the series. He is voiced by Andrew Francis.

Shining Armor is depicted as a responsible and protective anthropomorphic unicorn who is the older brother of Twilight Sparkle. Following his marriage to Princess Cadance, he becomes a prince consort and later co-ruler of the Crystal Empire. While competent with defensive and protective magic, his diligence earned his promotion to Captain of the Royal Guard in Canterlot. Shining Armor is shown to be loving and fiercely protective of Twilight, and equally competitive with her, being labeled as her BBBFF (Big Brother Best Friend Forever). He is characterized by his prince charming and knight in shining armor archetype. IDW comics and Gameloft games portray him having a "nerdy" and "goofy" side in his shared enthusiasm for comics and games with his sister, and in his relationship with his fellow guardsmen and friends 8-Bit & Gaffer.

== Appearances ==
=== Fourth My Little Pony incarnation (2010–2021) ===
==== My Little Pony: Friendship Is Magic ====
Shining Armor first appears in the second season finale "A Canterlot Wedding" when he is marrying Cadance. Throughout the episode, Shining Armor is mostly shown under Queen Chrysalis's spell. After being freed from Chrysalis's influence by the real Cadance, he combines his shield magic with her love magic to create a powerful barrier that repels the changeling invasion from Equestria.

In the third season premiere "The Crystal Empire", he is sent alongside Cadance to defend the Crystal Empire from King Sombra. However, an encounter with Sombra leaves Shining Armor's horn encrusted with crystals, rendering him unable to support the forcefield his wife holds over the city. When the Crystal Empire is finally saved, Cadance is declared the new Princess of the city, and likewise Shining Armor takes his place beside her as prince consort.

In the fifth season episode "The One Where Pinkie Pie Knows", it is revealed that Shining Armor and Cadance are expecting a child. He becomes the father to Flurry Heart in the sixth season premiere "The Crystalling". This role proves extremely exhausting for the stallion, but he proves deeply committed to his family.

=== My Little Pony: Pony Life ===
In the spin-off reboot series My Little Pony: Pony Life, Shining Armor appears in the episode Little Miss Fortune as the ringmaster of the circus of the Crystal Empire Carnival. His family relations to Cadance and Twilight are not specified.

== Equestria Girls alternate version ==
Shining Armor's human world counterpart makes a cameo appearance in My Little Pony: Equestria Girls – Friendship Games as a former student of Crystal Prep Academy, in which he encourages Twilight Sparkle's human world counterpart to participate in the titular competition as he had done in the past. He also makes a background appearance in the Dashing Through the Mall segment of the special My Little Pony: Equestria Girls – Holidays Unwrapped.

== Reception and analysis ==
Media scholar Kevin Fletcher wrote that in "A Canterlot Wedding" he is given "the traits of a romantic hero, but he is under the grasp of Queen Chrysalis" and ultimately requires rescue by the female protagonists. Fletcher wrote that despite Shining Armor's position as captain of the royal guard, the episode relegates him to a supporting role even in his own wedding episodes, and the main dialogue and action largely belong to the female characters.

Christian Valiente and Xeno Rasmusson wrote that Shining Armor was an example of how Friendship Is Magic positions male characters as "secondary" to female leads: despite his military rank and authority, he is "rendered inept" and "under the command of females" throughout his major appearances. They commented that even when male characters like Shining Armor "have power and authority," the show "consistently focus[es] on female characters in positions of leadership," and male characters primarily serve a supportive role rather than drive plot development.

Samuel Oatley wrote that Shining Armor fits the "Symbiotic Father" archetype, in which male parental figures in contemporary animation become increasingly defined not by their individual characters, but by their relations within the family (i.e. his marriage with Cadance, his relationship with his sister as a "B.B.B.F.F.", and his status as a parent to Flurry Heart). Oatley wrote that Shining Armor's character trajectory shows how modern cartoon fathers are often stripped of autonomous identity and transforms a complex individual into vessels whose primary purpose is to facilitate the growth and development of their dependents.

Sherilyn Connelly of SF Weekly wrote that Shining Armor, being the captain of Canterlot's Royal Guard, is an indication that "unicorns have always been at the top of the social ladder", and is evidence of Twilight's social privilege in Equestrian society. Carly Olsen of Screen Rant ranked the pairing between Shining Armor and Princess Cadance as one of the ten best pairings in the series. Theo A. Peck-Suzuki wrote that their relationship represents a "romantic ideal" and "successful marriage" within the show's narrative; fan-created merchandise featuring the pair are popular, such as custom plushies with magnetic noses designed to simulate kissing.

== See also ==
- Princess Cadance
- Twilight Sparkle
- Princess Celestia
- Princess Luna
- List of My Little Pony: Friendship Is Magic characters
