= Equestria =

Fictional principality of talking ponies

- My Little Pony: Friendship is Magic; My Little Pony: Equestria Girls; My Little Pony: Pony Life; My Little Pony: Make Your Mark location
- A map of Equestria; Across the eastern sea lies the Dragonlands and Griffon Continent.

- Standard of Equestria, as depicted in season 2 of My Little Pony: Friendship is Magic
- Created by: Lauren Faust
- Genre: Fantasy

In-universe information
- Type: Federal Monarchy, Diarchy, Matriarchy, Alicorn Tetrarchy
- Ruled by: Heads of State: Princess Celestia (Head of Government until abdication); Princess Luna (Head of Government until abdication); Princess Twilight Sparkle (Head of Government, Element of Magic); Princess Cadance and Prince Shining Armor (Co-Leaders of the Crystal Empire)
- Ethnic groups: Ponies; Demonym(s): Equestrian
- Race: List of species: Majority: Pegasi Ponies; Unicorn Ponies; Earth Ponies Minority: Alicorns; Thestral Ponies; Mules; Donkeys; Dragons; Griffins; Draconequi; Breezies; Bisons; Buffalos; Minotaurs; Yaks; Zebras; Siren (formerly); Hippogriffs/Seaponies
- Locations: List of locations: Capital Region: Canterlot (Capital); Ponyville (Main Setting); Cloudsdale; Everfree Forest; Winnyiapolis; Neighagara Falls Frozen North: Crystal Empire; Crystal Mountains; Yaket Mountain Range Celestial Coast: Baltimare; Manehattan; Fillydelphia; Sire's Hollow; Hollow Shades; Seaward Shoals; Haysead Swamps; Griffish Isles Lunar Coast: Vanhoover; Tall Tale; San Franciscolt; Las Pegasus; Applewood; Califoalnia Mysterious South: San Palomino Desert; Dodge Junction; Appleloosa; Sonambula; Sea of Clouds
- Character: Senior civil government and military high command: Captain of the Royal Guard; Prince Shining Armor (Captain of the Guards, Prince Consort of Princess Cadance) Regents / Consorts / Heirs: Princess Flurry Heart (Heir to the throne of the Crystal Empire) Council of Friendship; Spike (Hero of the Crystal Empire, Friendship Ambassador to the Dragon Lands, Royal Advisor to Princess Twilight Sparkle); Rainbow Dash (Element of Loyalty, Wonderbolts officer, School of Friendship teacher); Pinkie Pie (Element of Laughter, Friendship Ambassador to Yakyakistan, School of Friendship teacher); Rarity (Element of Generosity, School of Friendship teacher); Applejack (Element of Honesty, School of Friendship teacher); Fluttershy (Element of Kindness, School of Friendship teacher)
- Main setting: Ponyville
- Federal capital: Canterlot
- National language: Ponish (Ponyspeak) (Extremely similar to Modern English, with the exception of certain "horse-pun pronouns".)
- Currency: Equestrian Bit
- Enemies: List: Current: Windigos Historically (currently allies): Changeling Hive; Griffonstone; Dragonlands; Storm Empire; Yakyakistan; Discord

Equestria (/ɛˈkwɛstriə/) is a fictional kingdom and the main setting of the fourth, fifth, and sixth generations of the My Little Pony toy line and media franchise, including the animated television series My Little Pony: Friendship Is Magic (FIM) and its spinoff My Little Pony: Pony Life. Created by Lauren Faust, the setting incorporates many elements of fantasy, including inspirations from European and Greek mythology.

Equestria serves as the backdrop for the adventures of Twilight Sparkle, the main character of Friendship is Magic, and her friends, who are collectively referred to as the Mane Six. Equestria is shown to be located on a terrestrial planet, similar to Earth and hosts many intelligent, conscious, sentient and sapient creatures. Equestria's foundation is described as the result of the cooperation of unicorns, pegasi, and earth ponies.

Equestria is benevolent in nature. Its society favors egalitarian love, Friendship, diplomacy, and is matriarchal. Its people, ponies, have near-mastery over their environment; earth ponies cultivate the land, pegasi stabilize seasonal weather-patterns, unicorns advance scientific research, and alicorns control the day/night cycle, creating a nation of unrivaled stability and prosperity. Although depicted as generally prosperous and peaceful, Equestria engages in conflicts with various magical and supernatural threats throughout the series. The "Bit" is the national currency of Equestria and its territories. Throughout the FIM series, Equestria is a de facto matriarchy/tetrarchy ruled by "Alicorn princesses", though this title is more akin to a de facto Queen regnant in practice, with princesses exercising wide-reaching executive authority.

== Development ==
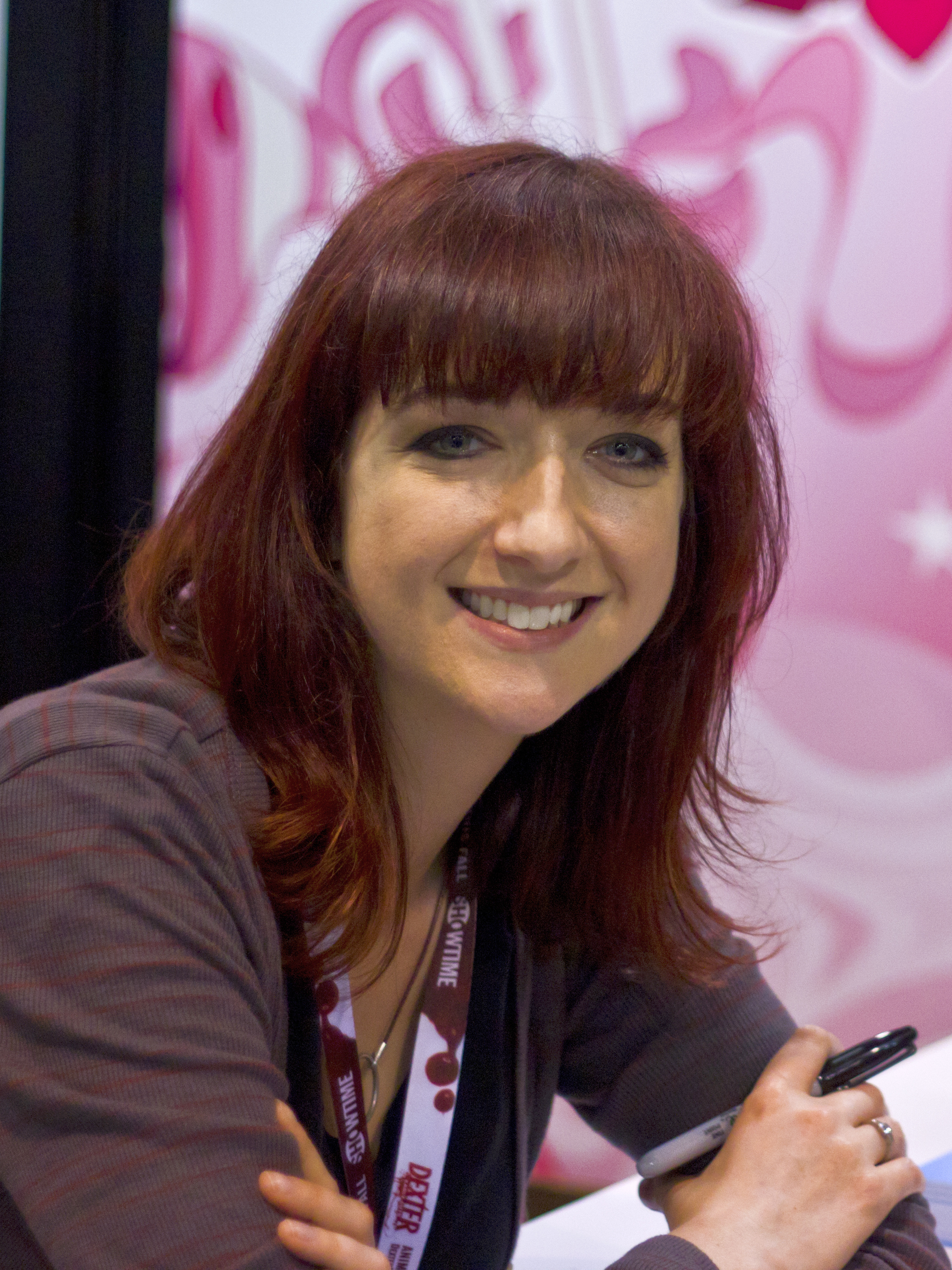
Lauren Faust, the creator of My Little Pony: Friendship is Magic, developed Equestria to be the backdrop for the show.

Two years were spent on creating the foundation of the series. Pennsylvania Dutch design, steampunk fantasy art, European fairy tales, and Bavarian folk art served as influences for the original pony world. In some cases, Hasbro requested that the show include certain settings but allowed Faust and her team to create its visual style which Hasbro would then base a toy set on; an example is the Ponyville schoolhouse.

== History ==
The history of Equestria, as depicted in My Little Pony: Friendship is Magic, began at the end of the "Age of Eternal Winter." Before founding Equestria, the three major pony types—Earth Ponies, Unicorns, and Pegasi—were separate tribes. This period is described as chaotic, when horse-like creatures known as windigos, who feed on hate and division, brought freezing temperatures and eternal darkness to the world, and other monsters terrorized the populace. The three tribes separately emigrated to the land of Equestria, where they began feuding with each other, which fueled the strength of the windigos. Eventually, the tribes set aside their squabbles to unite as the nation of Equestria and defeat the Windigos. The foundation of Equestria is celebrated during the annual Hearth's Warming Day festival, which is depicted as similar to the Christmas or Yule celebrations.

Equestria initially struggled with ensuring that the sun and moon set at the proper times, which drained the powers of Equestria's most powerful sorcerers. The birth of future princesses Celestia and Luna, alicorn sisters who could raise and lower the celestial bodies at will, ushered in an era of prosperity. The sisters were crowned as the rulers of Equestria and were trained by the legendary wizard Star Swirl the Bearded to use their powers.

Under Princess Celestia and Luna, Equestria could focus greater magic and resources on its development despite the emergence of threats like the evil centaur Lord Tirek, the chaos god Discord, and wars between ponies and the shapeshifting Changeling Hive. Under the princesses, Equestria was transformed into a regional superpower. Six legendary ponies wielded the Elements of Harmony to defend Equestria from these threats and planted the Tree of Harmony so other generations could do the same. The status quo remained unchanged until the corruption of Princess Luna, who transformed into Nightmare Moon with the intent of plunging Equestria into eternal night. This culminated in Celestia banishing her own sister to the moon for a millennium, creating a pattern of maria on the surface that resembled the head of a unicorn, creating the legend of "the mare in the moon" a play on the man in the moon. After 1,000 years of exile, Nightmare moon returned, only to be defeated by the Mane Six. After her defeat, she returned to being Princess Luna.

In Equestria's early history, the northern Crystal Empire was ruled by Princess Amore. Later, the tyrannical King Sombra took over the kingdom and enslaved the Crystal Ponies. After Celestia and Luna defeated Sombra with the magical Crystal Heart, he cursed the Crystal Empire to disappear, which it did for one thousand years. The Crystal Empire later reappeared and was ruled by Princess Cadance and her husband, Shining Armor.

By the end of Friendship is Magic, the rule of Equestria was passed down to Princess Twilight Sparkle. The reign of Twilight Sparkle brought about increases in peace, prosperity, hope, and love as Princess Twilight continued her magical research and made her diplomatic mission to spread friendship to every creature in need. Throughout Equestria's history, it has maintained distant but mostly friendly relations with other nations like the Zebras and Yaks.

The period after the return of Princess Luna through the ascendancy of Twilight Sparkle is the era most detailed by the main comics, television series, and video games. It is, therefore, fully canonical, according to the showwriters.

=== Alternate continuity timelines ===
Time magic is featured in the franchise on several occasions. In the series, time magic was discovered and/or invented by Starswirl, which allowed him to manipulate time and remain ageless. Celestia later outlawed time magic due to the risks of irresponsible time travel, and all knowledge about it was stored within the "Starswirl the Bearded" Wing of the Canterlot Archives.

In "The Cutie Re-Mark," several alternate versions of Equestria are depicted as a result of Starlight Glimmer changing history. In the first alternate timeline shown, King Sombra expands the Crystal Empire's borders to cover half of Equestria and the Griffon Kingdom. In the second, Queen Chrysalis and the Changelings have conquered Canterlot, forcing many ponies into hiding. In the third, Nightmare Moon rules Equestria in the eternal night after banishing Celestia to the moon. Further alternate realities include one ruled by Discord, one in which Tirek ravages the land, one in which Flim and Flam bulldoze the Everfree Forest for development, and one in which Equestria is reduced to a barren wasteland. These alternate realities are later undone by Twilight Sparkle.

It is theorized that Generation 5 follows an entirely different alternate continuity, and that it has a timeline where previous events similar to Generation 4 occurred. This is evident by the three pony tribes once again fragmented from each other and divided by hostility, as well as the loss of their respective abilities such as telekinesis, flight, and enhanced strength due to the disappearance of magic from the world.

== Inhabitants ==
=== Ponies ===
==== Development and design ====
Faust imagined the three ponies—unicorns, pegasi, and earth ponies—having different cultures and living in various places. She pictured the unicorns in the mountains, pegasi in the clouds, and earth ponies, similar to real horses, on the ground. According to Faust, the entirety of Friendship Is Magic is influenced by the fantasy genre. The team borrowed from mythology for most of their pony designs.

In addition, Faust envisioned the ponies as realistic horses who ate hay, lived in barns, pulled carts, wore saddles, and used their mouths to pick up things—qualities that were formerly avoided. After an idea from fellow animator Paul Rudish, many ideas of how the ponies' world was special came to Faust; she imagined the ponies as the stewards of their world who made their weather happen, flowers grow, and animals thrive.

Initially, Faust's designs were similar to the original ponies'. However, they "just didn't feel right" with upturned noses, straight faces, large heads, and small bodies. After drawing a doodle of a random pony, Faust decided to use that design. When creating ponies, the artists needed to be attentive to shape and proportion. Their bodies were similar to the shapes of beans: heads to a ball and legs to curved triangles. Often, the ponies were the height of three heads, divided into three parts:

- The head is the largest and longest.
- The body is approximately half the head's height but the same width.
- The legs are slightly shorter than the head.

Other prominent body parts include the neck, which is half the head's width, and the eye, a central element to the ponies' design in placement, size, and shape. While many eyes differ in details, the placement and shape are normally unvarying. Throughout the later seasons of Friendship Is Magic, body types have varied, being designed to embody diverse characteristics, including age and personality.

==== Pony subspecies ====
There are three major pony subspecies that make up the majority of Equestria's population, comprising roughly one-third each.

===== Earth Ponies =====
Earth ponies possess an underlying connection to the earth, nature, and the environment that encourages the growth of plant life and a connection with wild animals. Earth pony-based technology is purely mechanical and often intended to replicate things they cannot do themselves. Earth ponies form the backbone of Equestria's economy, operating within most industrial sectors involving natural resources, construction, or extraction. Their natural talents in agriculture, forestry, and mining extend from plants to rock farms. Earth ponies exhibit increased strength, endurance, stamina, fortitude, and durability compared to pegasi and unicorns.

===== Pegasi =====
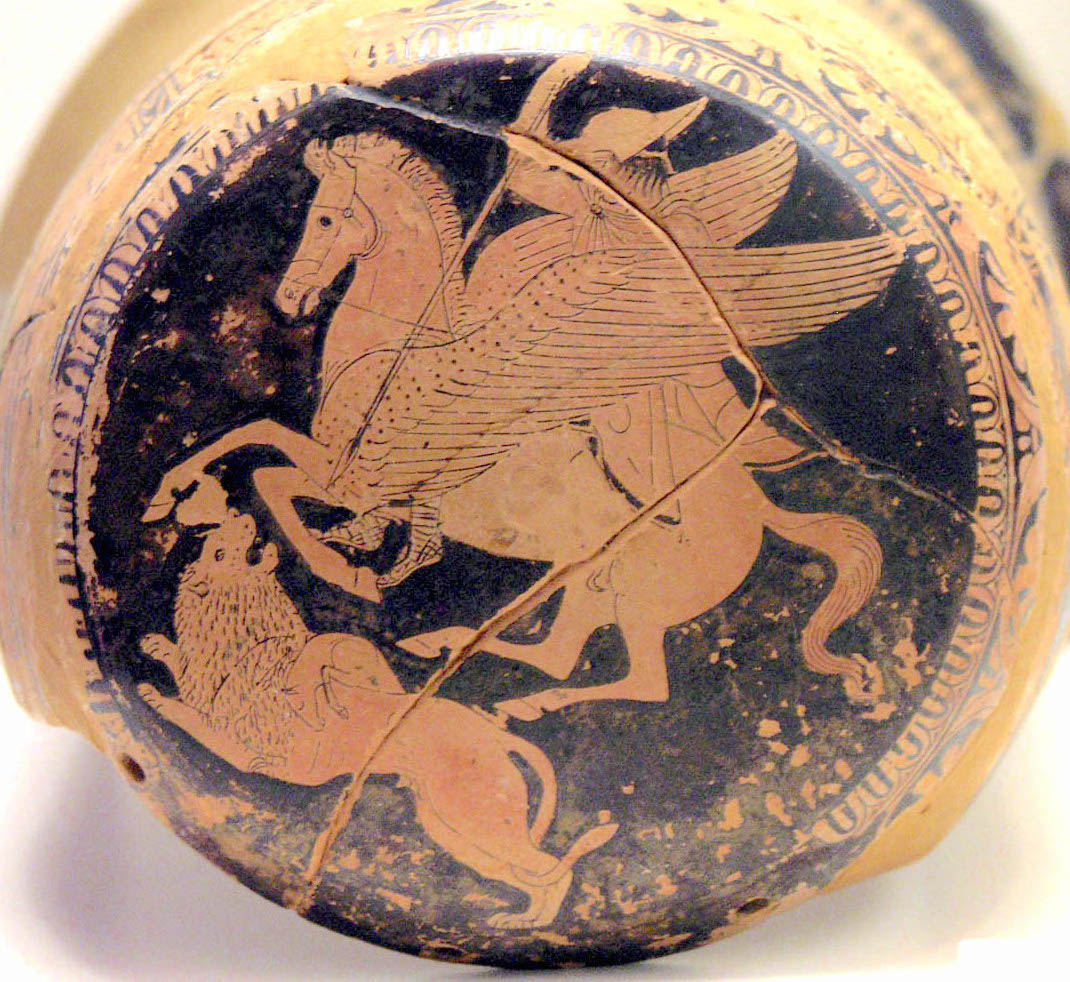
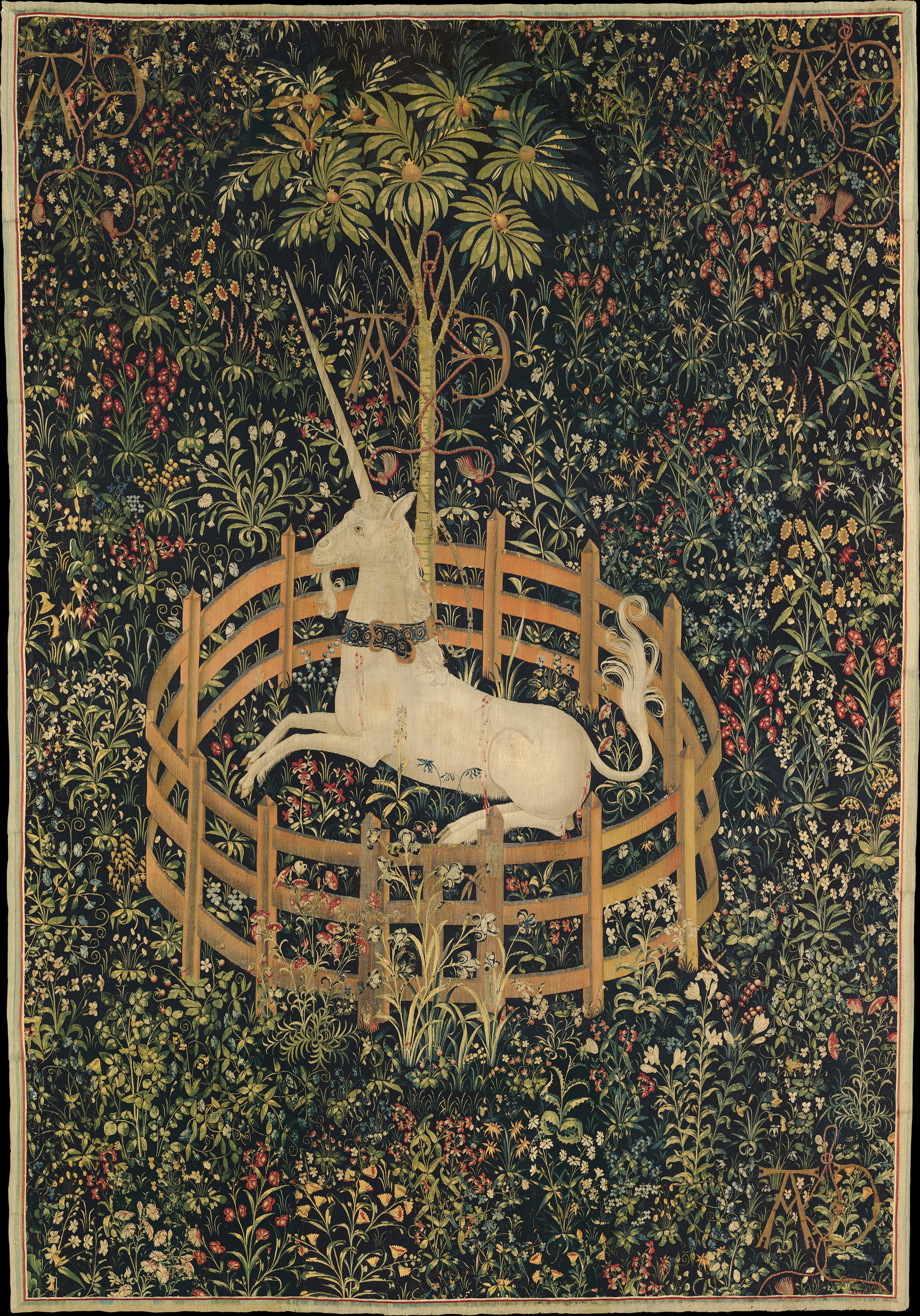
Faust stated that she borrowed from Greek and European mythology when designing creatures, like the pegasus and chimera pictured on this ancient Greek vase, or the Medieval unicorn.

Pegasi have the unique ability to fly and control the weather. This ability is powered by a pair of feathered wings, which is the distinguishing anatomical feature of pegasi compared to other pony races. Pegasi comprise the majority of ponies responsible for the postal service, patrolling Equestria's airspace, and controlling Equestria's weather. Pegasi are the only type of pony able to interact with clouds naturally as if they were tangible; this allows them to walk on and move clouds and, by extension, control the weather (although other pony types can do this through artificial means using magic). In the episode "Hurricane Fluttershy," a coordinated team of one hundred pegasi demonstrates their ability to generate a waterspout to funnel water from a lake.

A quality Faust borrowed from her childhood with the pegasi was a cold shower fountain that made her believe the pegasi lived in the clouds. She credited Paul Rudish for the inspiration of the pegasus ponies controlling the weather when he was drawing a pegasus pony running across clouds and creating rain.

===== Unicorns =====
Unicorns can directly absorb, wield, channel, and manipulate magic. Their magic is projected by a horn of variable length, texture, and color on their forehead. However, a unicorn's horn can be destroyed, severely inhibiting its magical capabilities. Unicorns are among the most educated and scholarly of Equestria's citizens. While other ponies' innate magical abilities manifest physically (such as an earth pony's strength or a pegasus' flight) and can be described as "intuitive or instinctive," unicorns require decades of training and study to master any spell beyond the most fundamental. Many spells and abilities are open to all unicorns, but many specialize in areas like teleportation, transfiguration, or medicine. Generally, unicorns have a collection of various spells relating to their specialty, with one being vastly more effective than the rest.

As Hasbro created a castle that Faust put up on her dresser, she believed unicorns would live in the mountains.

===== Alicorns =====
Alicorns have the distinguishing features of all three primary pony races—the horn of a unicorn, the wings of a pegasus, and the strength of an earth pony. They are typically taller and proportionally thinner than the average pony. Alicorns are either biologically immortal or age extremely slowly, as Celestia ruled Equestria for 1,000 years after banishing her sister to the moon. Alicorns are (typically) not a naturally occurring subspecies of pony, rather they are chosen by another alicorn to become one, usually after accomplishing a great deed. The sole exception to this rule is Flurry Heart, the daughter of Princess Cadance and Shining Armor, a unicorn who is the older brother of Twilight Sparkle. The rulers of both Equestria (Princesses Celestia, Luna, and Twilight Sparkle) and the Crystal Empire (Princess Mi Amore Cadenza or "Cadance") are all alicorns.

===== Crystal Ponies =====
Crystal ponies are the inhabitants of the Crystal Empire, a semi-autonomous region in Equestria. Their bodies sparkle and give the appearance of faceted edges and angles, in a similar way to crystals.

===== Thestral Ponies =====
Thestral ponies (or simply "thestrals") have slit-pupil eyes, night vision, and echolocation as well as bat-like wings that give them the ability to fly, similarly to pegasi. Though unlike pegasi, they are unable walk on clouds.

=== Creature demographic ===
The world of Equestria is shown to be inhabited by various magical creatures besides ponies. Faust considered the previous My Little Pony series "more focused on cupcakes and tea parties, and it was getting disconnected from its fantasy roots." As a result of this and the fact that ponies were based on mythology, she based many of the creatures and villains on mythology. These were modified and redesigned to fit Friendship Is Magic's world and demographic.

==== Friendly ====
===== Zebras =====
Zebras, such as Zecora, are distinguishable by their body patterns, thinner legs, and thicker stripes, though they have similar shapes. Since real-life zebras are native to Africa, the tribal culture of the continent serves as an influence on patterns, masks, colours, and homes.

===== Buffaloes =====
Buffaloes live in a Great Plains like region to the west of Ponyville. They originally are depicted as commonly clashing with the Appleloosans, predominantly Earth Pony settlers, over land and resources. The Mane Six, however, do manage to establish lasting peace between the two groups. They are heavily inspired by the Plains Indians of North America, since Bison/ Buffalo are considered a sacred and important animal in their culture.

===== Deer =====
Deer are depicted as mysterious residents of the Everfree Forest who share a connection to the forestry and surrounding wilderness. They are the indigenous inhabitents of the Ponyville area, living there before the area was settled by Earth Ponies, at least 100 years prior to the time depicted in MLP:FIM.

===== Dragons =====
Dragons inhabit the aptly named Dragonlands. In the My Little Pony series, typical dragons breathe fire, eat gemstones, and are shown to be aggressive. They don’t recognize the authority of the principality, instead being led (on occasion) by the Dragon King, ponies are seen as weak and infearer to dragonkind. Though the dragons are based upon traditional designs, they have exaggerated noses and large heads with thin necks to invoke humor. The initial dragon design was more elegant and had a resemblance to the ponies. Although one notable dragon out of all, Spike, accompanies the Mane Six, doesn't inhabit the Dragonlands, aside from the "Dragon Quest" episode, and is not drawn in a traditional dangerous dragon design.

===== Changelings =====
Changelings are insectoid equine creatures with a shiny black carapace and blue chitinous wings, though more colorful variations appear later in the show. They have the unique ability to shapeshift, which they often use for infiltration and espionage. They feed on love.

===== Draconequi =====
Draconequus are beings of immense power, powerful enough to alter reality at a whim. Discord is the only example of a Draconequus portrayed in the main television series; however, he and others reference Draconequi as a species, implying that there is more than one. The species is a dragon-like chimera made from the body parts of different animals.

==== Hostile ====
===== Windigos =====
Windigos (not Wendigos) are ghostly winter spirits that feed on hatred, resentment, and conflict; causing extreme cold and blizzards, as shown in the A Hearth's Warming Tail and "Hearth's Warming Eve"; they are manifestations of negative emotions that historically divided the pony tribes, freezing the land in an ice age until friendship united them.

===== Nightmare =====
The Nightmare Forces in My Little Pony: Friendship is Magic comics are shadowy, dream-weaving entities led by figures like Shadowfright, who seek to spread fear by creating nightmares and possessing ponies, notably transforming Princess Luna into Nightmare Moon and later corrupting Rarity into Nightmare Rarity, using their dark magic to torment ponies with their deepest fears through nightmares, aiming to corrupt and possess them, and plunge Equestria into eternal darkness.

== Geography ==
Equestria is the largest equine nation, stretching across a continent that touches the northern arctic and subarctic poles. Equestria reaches from the Undiscovered West's Luna Ocean to the eastern Celestia Sea's Griffish Isles; bordering the Frozen North's Crystal Empire and Yakyakington Mountains; to the Mysterious South's Forbidden Forests, The Badlands and Queendom of Changelings.

The Equestrian continent's diverse geography ranges, biomes, provinces, and settlements are modeled after or based on North American cities and the Nearctic realm. The full geography of Equestria is currently unexplored and evolving to fit the needs of the show writers. The Equestrian-explored portion of the continent is flanked by two vast oceans, bounded to the north by the mountainous Frozen North region and extends across the northern and southern hemispheres, ending with the Bone Dry Desert that borders the Mysterious South region. However, a map included in the Friendship Is Magic film indicates vast areas beyond these regions.

Like Earth, Equestria's world has one moon and is depicted as part of a solar system. Questions regarding heliocentrism or geocentrism are complicated by the fact that Celestia and Luna can move the Sun and Moon, respectively, at a mere whim. Similar constellations exist; with the caveat that most are also dangerous monsters, such as Canis Major and Ursa Minor. About the "Human World," it is unclear if Equestria is located in a parallel universe, or somewhere in the same universe as Earth.

Notable settlements, territories, dependencies, and major population centers in Equestria are identified throughout the series and used as the setting for one or more episodes. Most minor locations, or vaguely referenced areas outside Equestria, both in the television series and associated media are not specified whether these locations are part of Equestria or not. The films, television series, and other franchise media take place in many locations and their exact affiliation with Equestria is not explored.

As the creator of the show wrote, Lauren Faust explained on various social media pages, that the Everfree Forest is west of Ponyville, Sweet Apple Acres is southwest, and both Fluttershy's cottage and meadow are located north of the farm. Canterlot is northeast of Ponyville. However, in subsequent interviews, both Faust and Jayson Thiessen mentioned that the geography and continuity of the show are fluidly defined and are subject to change as necessary,

=== Capital Region ===
The Capital Region is Equestria's foundation and "ancestral lands", and its heartland in terms of culture, history, and political power. Its where the first "Hearth Warming" event united cooperation of the three pony tribes (earth, pegasi, unicorn) ended the "Eternal Winter". The Capital Region represents Equestria's original sovereign borders before the dynastic reign of Princess Celestia; all outlying territories represent the subsequent thousand-year expansion of the nation's imperialist interests. Much of the Capital Regions are "crown lands"; i.e. they are legally considered public land and are apart from the monarch's private estate.

==== Ponyville ====
Ponyville is the home of the series' main characters—Twilight Sparkle, Rainbow Dash, Applejack, Pinkie Pie, Fluttershy, Rarity, and Spike. Faust aimed for a "fairy-tale kind of feel" with Ponyville. Her photo references to Dave Dunnet were German cottages. His design incorporated elements that were part of real horses such as horseshoe-shaped archways, hay bales, and troughs.

Ponyville is known for its agricultural produce—apples, pears, carrots, etc.—and is home of "Sweet Apple Acres", Equestria's only source of domesticated zap apple jam. Ponyville has a school district, a diplomatic mission, a tourist destination, and a rail center—being the first/last connecting stop between Canterlot and other principalities. Ponyville incorporates minor influences from traditional small-town Americana.

The town has a host of eccentric characters, and is the setting for many episodes of the Friendship is Magic series. Twilight Sparkle's first impression of Ponyville upon first arrival was "Everypony in this town is crazy!"

The season 4 finale, "Twilight's Kingdom", introduces the Castle of Friendship in Ponyville as the residence of Twilight Sparkle, her assistant Spike, and her pupil Starlight Glimmer.

According to the book Art of Equestria, which describes the creation of Friendship is Magic, the creator of the series, Lauren Faust, originally proposed the name Fillydelphia (a pun on the city of Philadelphia) instead of Ponyville. The series later added Fillydelphia as a new, separate city.

Faust wrote in a comment on her DeviantArt page that the Everfree Forest is west of Ponyville, Sweet Apple Acres is southwest, Canterlot is northeast, and Fluttershy's cottage and meadow are located north of the farm. However, in subsequent interviews, both Faust and the supervising director and executive producer of the series, Jayson Thiessen, mentioned that the geography and continuity of the show are loosely defined and may change as necessary, and a layout artist for the series stated on December 10, 2011, that the production team had no official map of Equestria for reference.

Upon the release of Art of Equestria, however, an official map was released. It suggests that the Everfree Forest is to the east of Ponyville, Sweet Apple Acres to the southeast, and Fluttershy's cottage and meadow are located north of the farm.

==== Canterlot ====
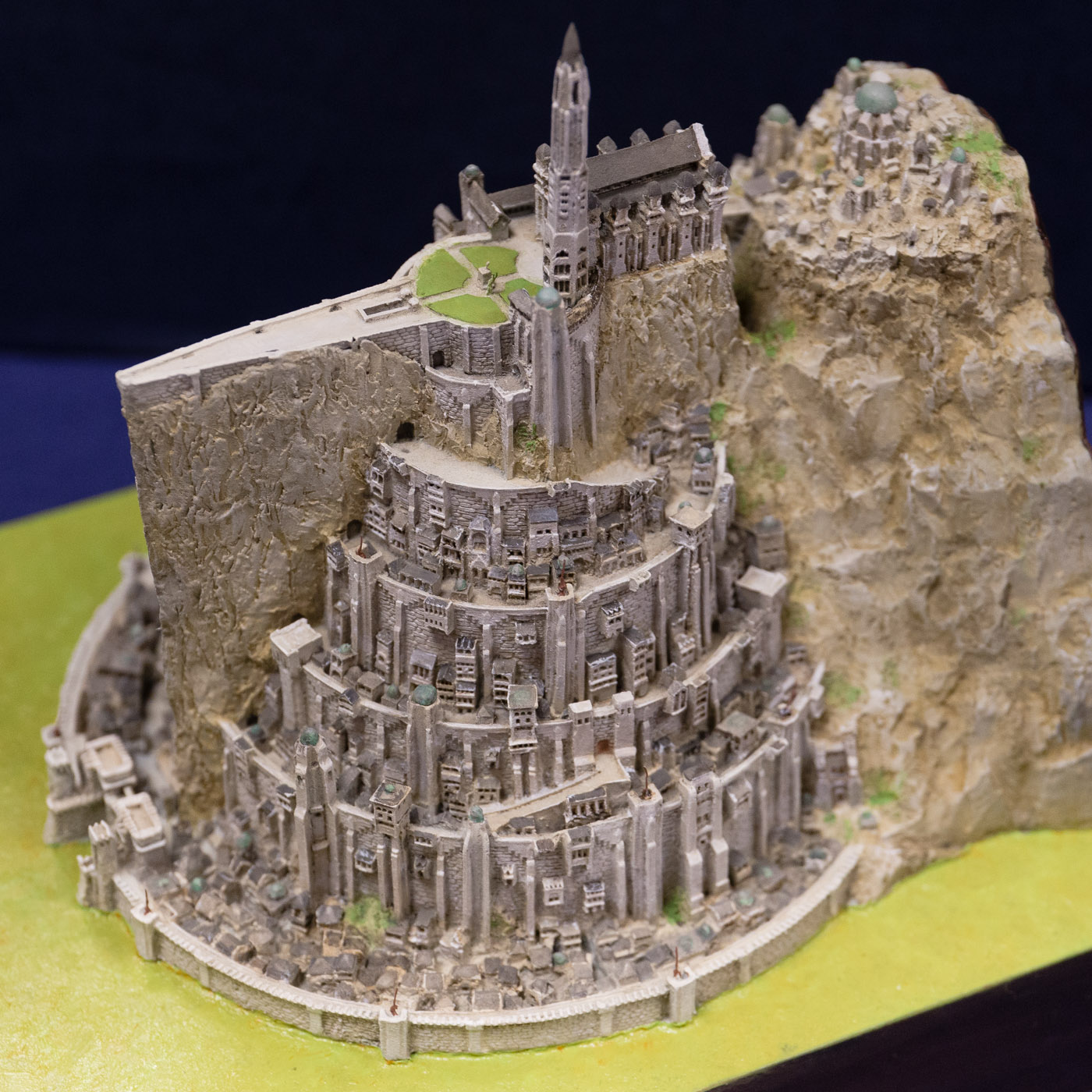
Minas Tirith, a fictional citadel from The Lord of the Rings, was one of the influences behind the design of Canterlot.

Canterlot is the capital city of Equestria, built on the side of the Foal Mountains. Canterlot is the setting of the royal court of Princess Celestia and Luna and the residence of Twilight Sparkle before Ponyville. Canterlot Castle is often at the center of state occasions and royal hospitality.

Faust aimed for a "European feel" with Canterlot. Her photo references to Dunnet were castles and cathedrals. Faust stated she preferred Dunnet's first instinct to his later more "cartoony" drawings of Canterlot; subsequently, he went back to the way he first drew the location. The stained glass windows reflect an awareness of the world. Its spires and turrets are similar to the Arthurian castles of Camelot, and its color pallette and mountaintop position represent royalty.

One of Faust's inspirations for Canterlot, with its castle carved into the side of the mountain, was Minas Tirith from The Lord of the Rings. Ted Anderson and Agnes Garbowska's inspiration for ancient Canterlot was ancient Rome.

According to Lauren Faust, Canterlot was originally called "Canterbury", after the historical English city, and the name "Canterlot" was suggested by her husband Craig McCracken.

==== Cloudsdale ====
Cloudsdale is the home of the Pegasi. It is influenced by classical Greco-Roman architecture; it has pillars and columns, which were choices based on the story. The show also references the Ancient Olympic Games, through Cloudsdale's use of tests of speed and agility. Unlike other cities, Cloudsdale floats on a series of clouds, and its location is always moving. It is visible from the perspective of Ponyville and Canterlot; and is only accessible by winged creatures or those that have had a "cloud-walking spell" cast upon them. It is the largest known Pegasi settlement in the realm, being the home of the Rainbow Weather Factory and acts as a de facto airborne aircraft carrier within the Capital Region for the Equestrian air force (like The Wonderbolts). Cloudsdale is said to be the original home and birthplace of Rainbow Dash and Fluttershy.

Cloudsdale is a pun on Clydesdale, a breed of horse; according to Lauren Faust, the name "Cloudsdale" was originally suggested by her husband Craig McCracken. The city is first depicted in "Sonic Rainboom".

==== Everfree Forest ====
The Everfree Forest is a large, enchanted forest grove in the boundaries adjacent to the Ponyville township; it is usually referred to simply as "the Forest". The Everfree Forest is home to Zecora and many wild creatures. As it is intended to be wild and untamed, its color palette is the opposite of Ponyville's and also has messier shapes. In its earlier development sketches, the creative team experimented with different palettes.

The forest is considered to be extremely hazardous, and travel through it is heavily discouraged. The forest is considered uninhabitable by all but the native Everfree Deers who inhabit it. It is the location of the Castle of Two Sisters, the Mirror Pool, and other enchanted phenomena. Due to the forest's rich biodiversity of exotic flora and fauna, Zecora frequently travels into the Forest for various reasons; she built her hut within to more easily harvest ingredients for her potions.

=== Frozen North ===
The Frozen North is dominated by the Yaket Mountain Range, north of Equestria, and characterized by an alpine climate, subarctic montane ecosystems, and polar climate. It is a setting in the IDW comic My Little Pony: Friends Forever issue 36. It has short cool summers and long cold winters, and biomes consisting of taiga, treeless tundra, glaciers, exotic medicinal plants, and permanent ice sheets.

==== Crystal Empire ====
The Crystal Empire is introduced in season three's premiere episode. It was founded by Princess Amore, a female unicorn who appears in the IDW comics' "My Little Pony: FIENDship is Magic Issue #1" and whose name appears in Little, Brown and Company's "The Journal of the Two Sisters". Celestia addresses the Crystal Empire as a sister nation that is part of Equestria, and the crystal ponies refer to themselves as Equestrian. In "The Ballad of the Crystal Empire", Twilight Sparkle mentions the Crystal Kingdom as part of the Crystal Ponies' history. It is also home to the Crystal Ponies. The book "Twilight Sparkle and the Crystal Heart Spell" names the Crystal Empire as part of Equestria.

The Crystal Empire is considered a semi-autonomous city-state and region within Equestria, and a non-sovereign monarchy ruled by Princess-Regnant Cadance and Prince-Consort Shining Armor, who were installed by Princess Celestia. The Crystal Empire is technically the oldest of Equestria's principalities. It was ruled by Princess Amore before the unification of the three pony tribes; its existence predates the founding of Equestria by centuries. Amore later befriended Luna and Celestia when they began traveling Equestria. At an unspecified timeframe predating Luna's banishment, Amore was defeated by Sombra when he first rose to power; she was turned to solid crystal, shattered and scattered across the world. The Sisters ended a conflict and enslavement instigated by King Sombra; his death cursed the capital causing it to vanished from existence.

The Crystal Empire reappears over 1000 years later, in the two-part Season 3 premiere, "The Crystal Empire". The Crystal Empire was annexed by Equestria after the second defeat of King Sombra. The Crystal Heart is the empire's most sacred magical artifact, which possesses the power to absorb, magnify, and deflect emotions. The crystal ponies used it in peacetime to exponentially amplify and project hope and love across Equestria. In times of conflict, it can be used as a weapon to demoralize the armies of would-be aggressors.

=== Celestial Coast ===
The Celestia Sea is located east of Equestria and is analogous to the Atlantic Ocean. The region's biomes, climate, and geographic terrain are equally analogous to Eastern Canada and the Eastern United States. The coastline is shown to be heavily urbanized. Across the sea, to the far east lies the Griffon Continent; notable nations include Griffonstone, the Griffish Isles, Bug Bear Territory, the Lands of the Hippogriffs, and the Lands of the Dragons.

==== Manehattan ====
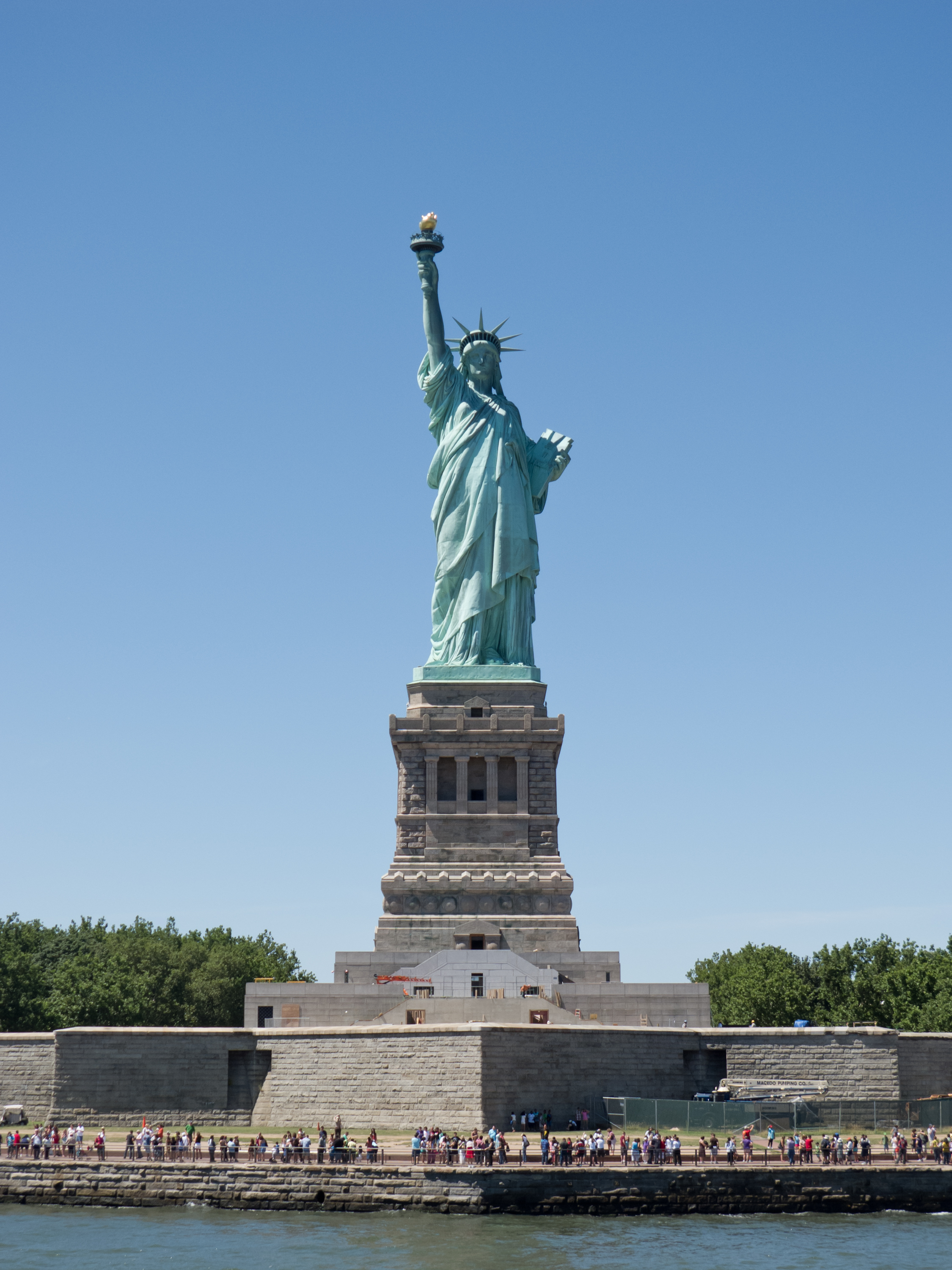
The fictional city of "Manehattan" features numerous references based on famous New York City landmarks, like the Statue of Liberty (pictured).

Manehattan is based on the archipelago of Manhattan and Long Island, portrayed as a large port metropolis, with many landmarks resembling those from New York City. A mirror of the Statue of Liberty, the "Mare Statue," is located on Friendship Island. The design and architecture of Manehattan is based on the 20th century and includes historical references. Phil Caesar of DHX Media stated he tried to avoid the use of modern technology within the city. Manehattan usually had things on top of its buildings.

It is first depicted in "The Cutie Mark Chronicles" and featured prominently in "Rarity Takes Manehattan". The city is characterized by 20th-century technologies; including tall buildings and skyscrapers with asphalt streets decorated with electric jumbotrons, neon signs, and lampposts. Ponies' primary forms of transportation are pony-drawn taxi carriages or walking. Manehattan is considered the largest most densely populated and ethnically diverse city in Equestria (sometimes called the "Capital of the World" in a commercial sense) hosting all manner of races and species, and is a major commercial, financial and cultural center.

==== Our Town ====
Starlight's Village, also called Our Town, is a community near Manehattan and is characterized by a semi-arid climate.

==== Hollow Shades ====
Hollow Shades was first mentioned in "Apple Family Reunion". The town first physically appeared in the Map of Equestria, a hand-drawn piece of artwork that lays out the canonical layout of Equestria, located east of Canterlot, tucked underneath a forest canopy, and hidden behind Foal Mountain.The Hollow Shades were also referenced in the episode: “Shadow Play: Part 2”

==== Seaward Shoals ====
Seaward Shoals is portrayed as a small rocky coastal port town, similar to those of the New England region of the United States. Also called Silver Shoals or Rocky Shoals, the community is the setting of the episode "P.P.O.V. (Pony Point of View)". The former Princesses, Luna and Celestia, retired to this region upon abdicating the throne.

==== Griffish Isles ====
Griffish Isles, an Equestrian archipelago commonwealth, located in the Celestia Sea off the north-western coast of continental "Griffon continent" (known by fans as Griffonia), and is analogous to the real world British Isles. On the official map, it is also very close to the Bug Bear Territory. Equestrian settlements include Buckingham, Manechester, and Trottingham (a portmanteau of 'Nottingham', an English city, and 'trot', a jogging speed for horses) the regional capital city of Griffish Isles. The Griffish Isles is first mentioned in "Stare Master"—where Rarity is making 20 gold-lined gowns for ponies there—and later mentioned in "Luna Eclipsed", "Simple Ways", and "Crusaders of the Lost Mark". Trottingham itself is said to be based on the British city of Birmingham and the ponies that inhabit it wear clothing inspired by British culture and have Cockney accents. Notable residents of Griffish Isles include Pipsqueak before a move, and Sassy Saddles before moving to the Equestrian mainland.

=== Luna Coast and Undiscovered West ===
The Undiscovered West is a vast, largely inaccessible, unknown region located west of the main Equestrian continent, with the vast Luna Ocean located beyond it, serving as a frontier for adventure and mystery within for the mane six. The region is depicted as having pristine, diverse landscapes, including large forests, rugged mountains, deep caves, extensive wetlands, massive lakes, and volcanic plains; with potential populations of deer, kirin, and other undiscovered creatures.

==== Las Pegasus ====
Las Pegasus is depicted as a floating cloud city; but unlike Cloudsdale, remains stationary and went though great lengths to accommodate non-pegasi tourists visiting on long semi-permanent basis. Based on the cities of Las Vegas and Paradise, Nevada, Las Pegasus is portrayed as "one big party", with many hotels, resorts, nightlife, amusement parks, restaurants, arcades, and casinos. Las Pegasus was the setting of the episode "Viva Las Pegasus". Las Pegasus actively competes with Applewood and Manehatten for the title of "entertainment capital of the world".

=== Mysterious South ===
This region is known for its arid deserts, temperate prairies and tropical rainforest biomes.

Appleloosa

Appleloosa is the most populous settlement in the region and is first featured in "Over a Barrel". Dodge Junction is based on the cities of the American Wild West, and is portrayed as a bustling township that mainly revolves around a cherry farm run by the earth pony Cherry Jubilee. Similar to Dodge Junction, Appleloosa, a pun of the Appaloosa horse breed, is a setting based on the cities of the American Wild West and mainly revolves around an apple orchard that is home to members of the "Apple Family". Appleloosa is depicted as bordering on the buffalo lands, home of the indigenous buffalo tribes. Appleloosa is also the hometown of Applejack's cousin Braeburn.

==== The Badlands ====
The Badlands are in the remote desert backcountry, and are known to be populated by terrifying creatures, such as diamond dogs, giant worms, and rogue dragons.

==== Somnambula ====
Somnambula, roughly based on Egypt and North Africa, has an arid, desert climate, excluding a few oases. It is notable as a city that the pony adventurer Daring Do has saved twice. Somnambula, a heroic pegasus who rescued the prince of the Kingdom from a sphinx, is the city's namesake. The city is noted as once being ruled over by pharaohs, and is first mentioned in the episode "Stranger than Fan Fiction", and shown again in the episode "Daring Done?".

=== Other locations ===
==== Hope Hollow ====
Hope Hollow is a township located in an unspecified region of Equestria. It was primarily led by the Skies family, who served as the mayors for at least three generations. Petunia Petals runs at least two businesses in the town and assists the Mayor in fulfilling seven government jobs in total, making her arguably the most important pony in the town.

==== Mentioned locations ====
The setting of San Franciscolt is based on the city of San Francisco, and is mentioned in the book Twilight Sparkle and the Crystal Heart Spell.

In episodes throughout the series and in promotional material, other locations are mentioned, but not used as settings. A partial list includes Baltimare, based on the city of Baltimore; Fillydelphia, which is based on the city of Philadelphia and was the original name for Ponyville when the show was in development; and Vanhoover, which is based on Vancouver, Canada and is described as the former home of "Grand Pear", Applejack's grandfather.

== Appearances ==
=== Fourth generation of My Little Pony franchise ===
Equestria first appeared in the fourth incarnation of the My Little Pony toyline and media franchise. It is the setting of the My Little Pony: Friendship Is Magic television series, and its associated media including comics, films, and video games.

=== Fifth generation of My Little Pony franchise ===
Equestria is also the setting of the animated film My Little Pony: A New Generation (2021), which is set hundreds or thousands after Friendship Is Magic, and launched the fifth generation of the My Little Pony franchise. It is widely theorized that generation 5 takes place in a separate timeline to generation 4, evident by the three pony tribes once again fragmented from and hostile to each other, as well as the loss of their respective abilities such as telekinesis, flight, and enhanced strength due to the disappearance of magic from the world. To compensate, ponies developed technology analogous to that of the late 2010s/early 2020s.

== See also ==
- My Little Pony: Friendship Is Magic fan fiction

== Notes ==
- This article incorporates material derived from the "Equestria" article on the My Little Pony wiki at Fandom (formerly Wikia) and is licensed under the Creative Commons Attribution-Share Alike 3.0 License (September 17, 2017).
- This article incorporates material derived from the "Celestia" article on the My Little Pony wiki at Fandom (formerly Wikia) and is licensed under the Creative Commons Attribution-Share Alike 3.0 License (April 13, 2019).
- This article incorporates material derived from the "Fictional chronology" article on the My Little Pony wiki at Fandom (formerly Wikia) and is licensed under the Creative Commons Attribution-Share Alike 3.0 License (February 13, 2020).
