= Fan Expo Denver =

Multi-genre fan convention in the United States

- Status: Active
- Genre: Popular Culture
- Venue: Colorado Convention Center
- Locations: Denver, Colorado
- Coordinates: 39°44′31″N 104°59′46″W
- Country: United States
- Inaugurated: June 15, 2012; 14 years ago
- Most recent: July 3, 2025; 16 months ago
- Next event: May 28, 2026; 5 months ago
- Attendance: 114,500 in 2016
- Organizer: Pop Culture Classroom (2012-2020); Fan Expo HQ/Informa Connect (2021-present)
- Website: fanexpodenver.com

Fan Expo Denver (previously Denver Pop Culture Con and Denver Comic Con) is a speculative fiction fan convention held annually in Denver, Colorado, United States. The event is a celebration of comics, books, movies, TV, gaming, and other pop culture.

The non-profit organization, Pop Culture Classroom, founded the convention in 2012. After being acquired by Informa/Fan Expo in 2021, the convention was renamed Fan Expo Denver.

== History ==
The inaugural convention was held from June 15-17 in 2012 with 27,700 people in attendance. Founded as Denver Comic Con, the convention was created as a program for the educational organization, Pop Culture Classroom (formerly Comic Book Classroom), and funded the nonprofit's year-round efforts.

In 2015, attendance at the event exceeded 100,000, making it one of the largest fan conventions in the United States.

In 2019, the convention's name was changed to Denver Pop Culture Con in response to a lawsuit from San Diego Comic-Con.

Pop Culture Classroom organized and ran the convention from 2012 to 2019. The event was canceled in 2020 due to the COVID-19 pandemic.

In March 2021, Fan Expo HQ acquired the convention from Pop Culture Classroom and renamed the event Fan Expo Denver. Pop Culture Classroom will remain a part of the event as its featured charity and by providing educational programs.

== Programming ==
The convention includes celebrity panels, seminars with professional creators, actors, and artists, workshops with comic book professionals, and the Reel Heroes Independent Filmmakers Series. Elements of the convention floor include celebrity autographs, large areas like "Artist Valley" and "Celebrity Summit", comic book dealers and collectibles merchants, as well as fan-based organizations like the 501st Legion. Cosplayers are featured during the annual Cosplay Classic (formerly known as the "DCC Cosplay Shindig"), the Opening Ceremonies with acts and other surprises, and associated events have included the Four Color Mixer and a genre-themed concert traditionally held at the Hard Rock Cafe Denver.

Among the distinct tracks of programming, for instance, the convention focused on comics and media featuring or produced by Colorado-area comics creators, women, minorities and the LGBTQ Community. In 2014, the conventions's Comic Book Corral (CBC) and 8-Bit Lounge gave more than 9,000 students the chance to meet artists, create comic book-themed crafts, and get hands-on experience with everything from stop-motion animated shorts to professional makeup jobs. In 2015, the Pop Culture Classroom Kids' Laboratory (PCC Kids' Lab) continued building on this success. Along with the usual mix of artist discussions, arts activities and exhibits, the PCC Lab featured activities focused around S.T.E.A.M. subjects (Science, Technology, Engineering, Arts, and Math) and pop culture topics beyond comic books. They also expanded the 8-Bit Lounge to connect even more artists, educators and professionals with students ages 12–19.

== Dates, attendance, and guests ==
No.	Dates	Attendance	TV, film, and animation guests	Comics, artist, and literary guests
1	June 15–17, 2012	27,700	Aaron Douglas, Billy West, Bruce Boxleitner, Chandler Riggs, Cindy Morgan, Colin Ferguson, David Uslan, Greg Weisman, James Marsters, Jasika Nicole, Khary Payton, Kristin Bauer, Lauren Cohan, Mark Ryan, Michael Uslan, Steven Seagle, Tom Kane	Adam Van Wyk, Allen Bellman, Amy Reeder, Barry Kitson, Ben Templesmith, Bob Layton, Carrie Vaughn, David Uslan, Ed Stein, Ethan Nicolle, Glenn Kardy, Gail Simone, Georges Jeanty, Greg Guler, Herb Trimpe, J. Scott Campbell, James O'Barr, Jason Aaron, Joseph Michael Linsner, Katie Cook, Laura Allred, Manga University, Matt Kindt, Michael Allred, Michael Uslan, Michael Zulli, Mike Baron, Mike Grell, Mike Keefe, Mike McKone, Monte Michael Moore, Noah Van Sciver, Peter Gross, Rebekah Isaacs, Sean Gordon Murphy, Sean Tiffany, Steven Seagle, T. K. Miller, Zach Howard
2	May 31 – June 2, 2013	61,000	Anthony Montgomery, Clare Kramer, Colin Baker, Daphne Ashbrook, Dee Bradley Baker, Eddie McClintock, Ellyn Stern, Erin Gray, Felicia Day, George Takei, Greg Weisman, Hal Rayle, J. August Richards, Jamie Katonic, Kelly Hu, Khary Payton, Nelsan Ellis, Peter Mayhew, Phil LaMarr, Raphael Sbarge, Robin Thorsen, Sandeep Parikh, Saul Rubinek, Steve T. Seagle, Steven L. Sears, Wil Wheaton	Action Lab Entertainment, Adam Van Wyk, Alfred Trujillo, Allen Bellman, Amy Reeder, Ande Parks, Andrew Pepoy, Andy Runton, Anthony Montgomery, Arthur Suydam, Ben Templesmith, Brian Pulido, Chris Moreno, Chris Ware, Clayton Crain, Dan Parent, Denny O'Neil, Dexter Vines, Doug TenNapel, Farel Dalrymple, Fiona Staples, Frank Beddor, Gabriel Hardman, George Pérez, Georges Jeanty, Glenn Kardy, Greg Guler, Greg Weisman, J. Scott Campbell, J. K. Woodward, Jamal Igle, Jeffrey Brown, Jeremy Whitley, Jim Mahfood, Jim Steranko, Joe Kelly, Joel Adams, John K. Snyder III, Jon Bogdanove, Josh Adams, Katie Cook, Andy Price, Kevin Freeman, Man of Action Studios, Manga University, Matt Kindt, Matt Wagner, Michael Zulli, Mike Baron, Mike McKone, Mike Raicht, Moritat, Neal Adams, Noah Van Sciver, Paul Ryan, Peter Bagge, Phil Jimenez, Ramona Fradon, Simon Roy, Steve T. Seagle, Thom Zahler, Tony Fleecs, Zach Howard
3	June 13–15, 2014	86,500	Adam West, Aimee Major Steinberger, Alexandre O. Philippe, April Stewart, Bruce Campbell, Burt Ward, Caity Lotz, Chandler Riggs, Christy Marx, David Yost, Denise Crosby, Edward James Olmos, Emmanuelle Vaugier, Gates McFadden, Gigi Edgley, Jason David Frank, Jennifer Hale, Jeremy Bulloch, Jeremy Shada, Jim Cummings, Jonathan Frakes, Julie Newmar, Karen Gillan, Kevin Conroy, Kimberly Brooks, LeVar Burton, Lou Ferrigno, Marina Sirtis, Mark Grove, Mark Meer, Max Charles, Michael Dorn, Michael Koske, Michael Rooker, Nicholas Brendon, Peter Davison, Rachel Skarsten, Rashaad Santiago, Robert Axelrod, Salli Richardson-Whitfield, Stephen Amell, Sylvester McCoy, Tyler Green, Veronica Taylor, Victor Cook, Walter Emanuel Jones, Walter Koenig, William Hart, William Shatner	Action Labs Entertainment, Adam Van Wyk, Alfred Trujillo, Allen Bellman, Alé Garza, Amalie Howard, Andrew Robinson, Andy Kuhn, Andy Price, Batton Lash, Ben Templesmith, Betsy Dornbusch, Big Dog Ink, BOOM! Studios, Brian Pulido, Cara Nicole, Chemistry Club, Christopher Jones, Christopher Ryder, Colleen Doran, Damian, Dan Parent, David Farland, Derek Fridolfs, Derek Hunter, DJ PharoahMoan, Dr. Arnold T. Blumberg, Dr. Kyle William Bishop, Edgar Delgado, Ellie Ann, Emily C. Martin, Eric Shanower, Fiona Staples, Francisco Herrera, Frank Beddor, Gareth Hinds, George Pérez, Georges Jeanty, Ger Tysk, Glenn Kardy, Greg Guler, Greg Horn, Greg Weisman, Humberto Ramos, James O'Barr, Janelle Asselin, Jason Henderson, Jason Howard, Jeremy Bastian, Jeremy Whitley, Joan Hilty, Joe Benitez, John Eaves, John Layman, Katie Cook, Kevin J. Anderson, Kristi Helvig, Langdon Foss, Lea Hernandez, Manga University, Mark Brooks, Mark Irwin, Matthew Inman, Max Brooks, Michael Golden, Mike Grell, Mike Kunkel, Neal Adams, Nei Ruffino, Papercutz, Patrick Gleason, Peter J. Wacks, Raphael Sbarge, Renee Witterstaetter, Rich Buckler, Robert Weiner, Ron Randall, Ryan Ottley, Sean Murphy, Shane Bitney Crone, Sherry D. Ficklin, Stant Litore, Steve Lieber, Steven L. Sears, Ted Naifeh, Tess Laeh, The Doubleclicks, The Stubby Shillelaghs, Thom Zahler, Tim Miller, Tim Sale, Tony Fleecs, Troy Little, Two Girls with Guitars, Ty Templeton, Tyler H. Jolley, Victor Olazaba, Vincent Gonzales, Yanick Paquette, Zach Howard, Zenescope
4	May 23–25, 2015	101,500	Alan Tudyk, Amy Acker, Anthony Michael Hall, Austin St. John, Brian Cummings, Clare Kramer, David Morrissey, Emma Caulfield, Eric Canete, Garrett Wang, Gwendoline Christie, Ilan Mitchell-Smith, Jess Harnell, Jewel Staite, Karen Gillan, Kelly Le Brock, King of Nerds, Lindsay Wagner, Lou Ferrigno, Manu Bennett, Mark Grove, Martin Olson, Maurice LaMarche, Michael Hogan (Canadian actor), Mitch Pileggi, Nichelle Nichols, Olivia Olson, Patrick Warburton, Randy Rogel, Rebecca Mader, Rob Paulsen, Scott Wilson, Sean Astin, Sean Maguire, Tress MacNeille, Vic Mignogna	Ahmad Nassri, Alane Adams, Allen Bellman, Amalie Howard, Amanda Conner, Amanda Strong, Andrew Robinson, Art Baltazar, Batton Lash, Becky Cloonan, Ben Templesmith, Bonnie Burton, Brian Pulido, Buzz, Carey Pietsch, Chrissie Zullo, Crystal Skillman, Dan Jurgens, Dan Wells, Dave Dorman, Dave Johnson, David Baron, David Petersen, DelSheree Gladden, Elliot S! Maggin, Eric Canete, Evan Palmer, Fred Van Lente, Fábio Moon, Gabriel Bá, Gail Wagner, Garth Ennis, Gene Ha, Glenn Kardy, Greg Guler, Howard Chaykin, Ian McGinty, Jacen Burrows, Jackie Estrada, Jason Henderson, Jeremy Haun, Jhonen Vasquez, Jim Butcher, Jimmy Palmiotti, John Beatty (illustrator), John Sazaklis, Jonathan Stroh, Joëlle Jones, Justin Ponsor, Kevin J. Anderson, Kieron Gillen, Klaus Janson, Kristi Helvig, Kyle Higgins, Liz Prince, Manga University, Marguerite Bennett, Mark Irwin, Mark McKenna, Max Brooks, MC Lars, Meghan Hetrick, Mike Baron, Mike Kunkel, Neal Adams, Nei Ruffino, Nick Spencer, Peter J. Wacks, Protomen, Randy "Rantz" Kintz, Rafael Albuquerque, Ramon Perez, Rob Weiner, Robert Moses Peaslee, Shawn Crystal, Sherry Ficklin, Stant Litore, Steve Leialoha, Steve Lieber, Sue Duff, Sunnydale High (band), Ted Naifeh, Tim Miller, Tim Sale, Tom Rasch, Tommy Lee Edwards, Tony Fleecs, Trina Robbins, Tyler Jolley, Van Jensen, Zach Howard
5	June 17–19, 2016	114,900	Alec Peters, Alex Kingston, Andrea Libman, Andy Mangels, Brent Spiner, Brian Cummings, Bruce Logan, C. Thomas Howell, Camren Bicondova, Cary Elwes, Clare Kramer, Clark Gregg, Dan Povenmire, David Acord, David Mazouz, Eric Canete, Garrett Wang, Greg Guler, Hayley Atwell, Ian Somerhalder, Jeffrey Dean Morgan, Jenna Coleman, Jennifer Shiman, John Barrowman, John de Lancie, John Eaves, John Rhys-Davies, John Stork, Judy Burns, Karl Urban, Katee Sackhoff, Lee Ross, Lena Headey, Manu Bennett, Manu Intiraymi, Martin Kove, Matthew Wood (sound editor), Paul Wesley, Peter David, Ralph Macchio, Sean Pertwee, Shannon Farnon, Shea Fontana, Stan Lee, Susan Eisenberg, The Hillywood Show, Todd Haberkorn, Vic Mignogna, Vincent Gonzales, William Zabka	Aaron Michael Ritchey, Alex Saviuk, Allen Bellman, Amalie Howard, Andrew Robinson, Andy Schmidt, Aspen MLT, Barbara Randall Kesel, Betsy Dornbusch, Billy Tucci, Brett Booth, Brian Pulido, Comic Book Certification Service, Carrie Vaughn, Cary Nord, Cat Staggs, L. J. Hachmeister, Chad Hardin, Chrissie Zullo, Colleen Oakes, Copic, Cyanide & Happiness, D. J. Butler, Dana Simpson, Dave Johnson, DC Comics, Drew Litton, Ellie Ann, Eneasz Brodski, Frank Mastromauro, Georges Jeanty, Glenn Kardy, Heather Finley, Ivy Doomkitty, J. Scott Campbell, Jae Lee, Jason Henderson, Jeanne Stein, Jim Shooter, Joe Benitez, Joe Corroney, Joe Staton, John Romita Jr., Jordan Gunderson, José Delbo, Karen Hallion, Kevin Hearne, Kevin Ikenberry, Kevin Maguire, Kidrobot, Kristi Helvig, Lisa Manifold, Manga University, Marguerite Sauvage, Mario Acevedo, Mark Irwin, Martin Pasko, Matt Webb, Matteo Scalera, Mike Keefe, Mindy Newell, Molly Tanzer, Norm Rapmund, Peter Steigerwald, R. C. Harvey, Rick Sternbach, Robert Atkins, Roger McKenzie, Ron Randall, Sarah A. Hoyt, Sci Fi Speed Dating, Shawn Crystal, Sherry Ficklin, SKYBOUND, Sphero, Stant Litore, Stephen Graham Jones, Steve Leialoha, Steve Lieber, Sue Duff, T. L. Morganfield, TeeTurtle, Terry Brooks, Tim Sale, Timothy Truman, Todd Nauck, Tom Hutchison, Tony Moore, Top Cow, Trekyards, Trina Robbins, VALIANT COMICS, Vivian Caethe, Yanick Paquette, Zach Howard.
6	June 30-July 2, 2017		Morena Baccarin, Millie Bobby Brown, Kevin Conroy, John Cusack, Felicia Day, Eliza Dushku, Lou Ferrigno, Nathan Fillion, Greg Grunberg, Phil LaMarr, James Marsters, Gaten Matarazzo, Caleb McLaughlin, Carey Means, Kate Mulgrew, Khary Payton, James Phelps, Oliver Phelps, Andrea Romano, Michael Rosenbaum, Chris Sabat, Sean Schemmel, Dana Snyder, Catherine Tate, Garrett Wang, "Weird Al" Yankovic	Neal Adams, Jennie Breeden, J. Scott Campbell, Frank Cho, Katie Cook, Larry Hama, Chad Hardin, Erica Henderson, Jae Lee, Mark Morales, Dan Parent, Andy Price, Humberto Ramos, Philip Tan, Ben Templesmith, Ty Templeton, Catherynne M. Valente
7	June 15–17, 2018		John Barrowman, Charlet Chung, Greg Cipes, Jason David Frank, Sean Gunn, David Harbour, Amy Jo Johnson, Val Kilmer, Pom Klementieff, Daniel Logan, Jamie Marchi, Jason Momoa, Kristian Nairn, Ray Park, Ron Perlman, Billie Piper, Lucie Pohl, Monica Rial, Chris Sabat, Jeremy Shada, Mark Sheppard, Joonas Suotamo, Alan Tudyk, Eric Vale, Bonnie Wright	Neal Adams, John Beatty, J. Scott Campbell, Greg Capullo, C. Robert Cargill, Kevin Eastman, John Eaves, Tony Fleecs, Gene Ha, Adam Kubert, Andy Kuhn, Ken Lashley, Darryl McDaniels, Frank Miller, Paul Pelletier, Raina Telgemeier, Billy Tucci, Chris Uminga, Mike Zeck, Chrissie Zullo
8	May 31 – June 2, 2019		George Takei, Matthew Lewis, Dan Fogler, Michael Rosenbaum, Clifford Chapin, Jewel Staite, Summer Glau, Jerome Flynn, Christopher Lloyd, Gigi Edgley, Justin Briner, Colleen Clinkenbeard, Justin Cook, Dave Bautista, Michael Rooker, Sean Gunn, Tom Wilson, Michelle Gomez, Tom Welling, Victor Garber, Jim Beaver, Patrick Warburton, Ming-Na Wen, Benedict Wong, Charles Martinet, Tara Strong, Lana Parrilla	Laura Bailey, Brian W. Foster, Taliesin Jaffe, Matthew Mercer, Liam O'Brien, Marisha Ray, Sam Riegel, Travis Willingham, Mark Steven Grove, Ginny Di, William Katt, Claudia Christian, James Lew, John Eaves, Keith Tucker, John Davey, The Wolf and the Crows, Sam Jones, Melody Anderson, Michael Gray, Fred Van Lente, Ryan Dunleavy, James Silvani, Amy Mebberson, Kyle Puttkammer, Khary Randolph, Ben Bishop, Crystal Skillman, Joel Adams, Neal Adams, Andy Kubert, Evan K. Pozios, Patrick Thomas Parnell, James Hostler, Jim Mehsling, Walter Ostlie, Andrea Molinari, Brian Fyffe, Greg Capullo, Vic Carrabotta, Joe Corroney, José Delbo, Christina Blanch, Chip Zdarsky, Mark Morales, Laura Martin, Mark Brooks, Andy Mangels, Allen Bellman, Afua Richardson Steve Orlando, Sherry Thomas, Tricia Levenseller, Amalie Howard Pamela Clare, S.J. Reisner, Frankie Love, Lisa Manifold, Meghan Scott Molin, Cindi Myers, Lisa Brown Roberts, Heather Webb, Kevin Hearne, Alexa Donne, Carrie Vaughn, Terry Brooks, Cat Winters, Nathan Hale, Delilah Dawson, Laurel McHargue, Wendy Terrien, Sherry Ficklin, Sue Duff, Corinne O'Flynn, Greg Neri, David Slavin, Cinda Williams Chima, Terri Libenson, Colleen Oakes
—	July 10–12, 2020	Rescheduled, then canceled because of the COVID-19 pandemic.		
9	October 29–31, 2021			
10	July 1–3, 2022		Anthony Daniels, Ashley Eckstein, Billy Boyd, Billy West, Brian O'Halloran, Carl Weathers, Charlie Hunnam, Christy Carlson Romano, Dante Basco, Dominic Monaghan, Elijah Wood, Emilio Rivera, Gina Carano, Jacob Bertrand, Jason Mewes, Jeff Anderson, Jessica Darrow, Kevin Smith, Martin Kove, Matthew Lewis, Ming-Na Wen, Peyton List, Ryan Hurst, Sean Astin, Trevor Fehrman, Will Friedle, William Zabka	Aaron Reynolds, Brian Azzarello, Dike Ruan, Helen Hardt, Jim Lee, Kami Garcia, Kel Kade, Leinil Francis Yu, Michael Cho, Neo Edmund, R.R. Virdi, Ryan Ottley, Simon Bisley, Zeb Wells
11	June 30 – July 2, 2023		Anthony Michael Hall, Beverly D'Angelo, Bonnie Wright, Brent Spiner, Brian Baumgartner, Carlos Valdes, Charlie Cox, Chevy Chase, Christie Brinkley, Christina Ricci, Christopher Lloyd, Dana Barron, Danielle Panabaker, Danny Trejo, Dee Bradley Baker, Elizabeth Berkley, Emily Bett Rickards, Emily Swallow, Gabriel Luna, Gates McFadden, Giancarlo Esposito, Grace Van Dien, Hayden Christensen, Henry Winkler, James McAvoy, Jamie Kennedy, Jodi Benson, Jon Bernthal, Jonathan Frakes, Joseph Quinn, Kate Flannery, Katee Sackhoff, Leslie David Baker, Mario Lopez, Marty Grabstein, Matthew Lillard, Michael Dorn, Neve Campbell, Nolan North, Peter Cullen, Richard Dreyfuss, Ron Perlman, Rose McGowan, Sam Raimi, Sarah Natochenny, Shameik Moore, Skeet Ulrich, Stephen Amell, Steve Burns, Tara Strong, Tom Felton, Vincent D'Onofrio, Vivien Lyra Blair	Agnes Garbowska, Andy Kubert, Clayton Crain, Don Rosa, Donny Cates, Emma Kubert, Frank Cho, Greg Land, Jackson Lanzing, Jae Lee, Jeremy Adams, Jim Lee, Joe Corroney, Joe Wos, Josef Rubinstein, Marc Silvestri, Pablo Villalobos, Patrick Gleason, Ryan Stegman, Steve McNiven, Tom Grummett, Zeb Wells
12	July 4-7, 2024		Adam Savage, Alexander Calvert, Andy Serkis, Antony Starr, Ashley Eckstein, Barry Bostwick, Ben McKenzie, Brandon Rogers, Brie Larson, Butch Hartman, Catherine Tate, Charles Martinet, Colby Minifie, Colleen Clinkenbeard, Dee Bradley Baker, Diana Lee Inosanto, Don Bluth, Eli Roth, Elizabeth Berkley, Ella Purnell, Ethan Suplee, Fred Tatasciore, Geena Davis, Grey DeLisle, Holly Marie Combs, James Arnold Taylor, James Phelps, Jared Padalecki, Jason Lee, Jason Priestley, Jennifer Hale, Jim Beaver, Jim Cummings, Johnny Yong Bosch, Keith David, Lana Parrilla, Mario Lopez, Marisa Tomei, Mark Sheppard, Mark-Paul Gosselaar, Matt Lanter, Michelle Hurd, Morena Baccarin, Oliver Phelps, Priscilla Presley, Rainn Wilson, Randy Quaid, Richard Dreyfuss, Roger Craig Smith, Rosario Dawson, Rose McGowan, Ruth Connell, Sean Gunn, Susan Sarandon, Valorie Curry	Aaron Reynolds, Alan Quah, Bryan Hitch, Claudia Gray, Dan Parent, Francis Manapul, Frank Miller, Gabriel Piccolo, Garrett Gunn, Geoff Johns, Guy Gilchrist, Ivan Reis, Jae Lee, Jason Aaron, Jason Fabok, Jock, Kael Ngu, Kami Garcia, Kevin Maguire, Mike Grell, Peter Tomasi, Rose Besch, Scott Snyder, Stephen Platt, Travis Hymel, Travis Mercer
13	July 3-6, 2025		Alan Tudyk, Amir Talai, Ashley Greene, Bitsie Tulloch, Blake Roman, Bob West, Brandon H. Lee, Brandon Rogers, Brandon Routh, Brendan Fraser, Bruce Campbell, Bryce Pinkham, Candice Patton, Carlos Valdes, Cassandra Peterson, Damien Haas, Danielle Panabaker, Dante Basco, David Giuntoli, David Ramsey, Dean Cain, Emily Bett Rickards, Erica Lindbeck, Erika Henningsen, George Newbern, Grant Gustin, Greg Baldwin, Jackson Rathbone, James Marsters, James Phelps, Jason Isaacs, Jennifer Beals, John Boyega, John Cena, John Hannah, John Rhys-Davies, Kellan Lutz, Lucas Grabeel, Mae Whitman, Manny Jacinto, Martin Kove, Michael Cudlitz, Michael Rosenbaum, Michaela Jill Murphy, Mike Tyson, Oded Fehr, Oliver Phelps, Patricia Velásquez, Patrick Luwis, Peter Facinelli, Richard Horvitz, Rob Schneider, Tim Daly, Tom Cavanagh, Tom Welling, Tyler Hoechlin, Vivienne Medrano, William Shatner	
14	May 28-31, 2026		Annabeth Gish, Billy Boyd, Bonnie Wright, Bryce Dallas Howard, C. Thomas Howell, Cameron Crovetti, Cara Buono, Cedric Yarbrough, Christian Borle, Christopher Judge, Colin O'Donoghue, Corey Feldman, David Duchovny, David Tennant, Dean Norris, Dolph Lundgren, Dominic Monaghan, Elijah Wood, Ethan Suplee, Felicia Day, Frank Welker, Gillian Anderson, Jaime Pressly, Jamie Kennedy, Jamison Newlander, Joe Pantoliano, John Noble, John Rhys-Davies, Josh Holloway, Karen Fukuhara, Karl Urban, Kerri Green, Krystina Alabado, Lance Barber, Lilli Cooper, Linda Blair, Matthew Lillard, Mike Colter, Mitch Pileggi, Nicholas Lea, Nolan North, Orlando Bloom, Pauly Shore, Peter Cullen, Ralph Macchio, Robert Patrick, Sean Astin, Skeet Ulrich, Temuera Morrison, Thomas Lennon, Tomer Capone, Valorie Curry, William B. Davis, Zoe Perry	

== Partnerships ==
Since the inaugural 2012 event, Breckenridge Brewery has collaborated with the convention to brew and sell a specialty beer, with the name chosen by a fan contest. The 2012 beer, an American wheat ale, was named, "The Fantastic Pour." The 2013 beer, a Belgian Wit brewed with Buddha's Hand fruit, was dubbed "The Caped Brewsader. The 2014 beer, an amber ale, was named "Brews Wayne." In 2015, "Hulk's Mash", a pale ale brewed with mosaic hops and mango puree, was debuted. "Snape-ricot", an Apricot American Lager, was voted 2016's beer name, in honor of the late Alan Rickman.

Aurora Rise, a non-profit group founded to provide financial support to victims of the 2012 Aurora, Colorado shooting, appeared at the 2013, 2014, 2015 and 2016 conventions. In 2016, Denver Pridefest was partnered with the convention, and there was LGBT related content.

== Awards ==
In March 2013, the event was voted "Best Fan Convention" by the editors of Westword, a local alternative press publication.
