= RuBronyCon =

Annual My Little Pony fan convention

- Status: Active
- Genre: My Little Pony fan convention
- Location: Moscow
- Country: Russia
- Inaugurated: 2012
- Most recent: 13–14 September 2025
- Website: https://rubronycon.ru/

RuBronyCon (РуБрониКон) is an annual My Little Pony fan convention held in Moscow, Russia organized for the fandom of the animated television series My Little Pony: Friendship Is Magic, whose adult fans are commonly referred to as bronies. RuBronyCon is the largest Russian brony convention.

The most recent RuBronyCon took place 13–14 September 2025 at the ZIL Culture Centre.

== Overview ==
RuBronyCon is the largest brony convention in Russia and includes cosplay shows, a vendor hall, panels, presentations, and a brony music concert. It serves as the primary gathering place for the large Russian-speaking brony community, which emerged in 2011 on online forums like 4chan. In 2014, RuBronyCon attracted over 1,200 attendees and its VK page had over 80,000 subscribers.

Other brony conventions hosted in Russia include Ponyrebrik in Saint Petersburg, SibBronyCon in Novosibirsk, and Mi Amore Fest in Moscow. Neighboring Ukraine also had its own brony convention, BronyUKon in Kyiv.

== See also ==
- BronyCon
- BronyCAN
- Czequestria
- GalaCon
- UK PonyCon
- Vanhoover Pony Expo
- List of My Little Pony fan conventions
