= Czequestria =

Annual My Little Pony fan convention

- Status: Active
- Genre: My Little Pony fan convention
- Venue: KD Krakov
- Location: Prague
- Country: Czech Republic
- Inaugurated: 29–31 August 2014
- Most recent: 21–23 August 2026
- Organizer: CZ/SK Bronies
- Website: http://czequestria.cz/

Czequestria is an annual My Little Pony fan convention held in Prague, Czech Republic organized for the fandom of the animated television series My Little Pony: Friendship Is Magic, whose adult fans are commonly referred to as bronies. Czequestria is the largest My Little Pony fan convention in the Czech Republic.

The most recent Czequestria took place 21–23 August 2026 at the KD Krakov cultural center.

== Overview ==
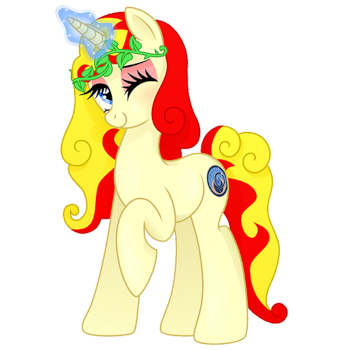
Poník Libuše, Czequestria's original character pony mascot

Czequestria is the largest brony convention in the Czech Republic and one of the largest in Europe. Its name is a portmanteau of Czech and Equestria, the main setting of My Little Pony: Friendship Is Magic.

The convention emerged from the Czech brony community, which has thousands of followers on their dedicated Facebook page and over 3,000 registered users on the Bronies.cz discussion forum. By 2015, Bronies.cz had garnered over 445,000 posts. The Czech brony community is active at various fantasy and science fiction events throughout the country; Czequestria serves as the community's primary annual gathering.

Czequestria was founded in 2014 and organized by the CZ/SK Bronies association. The second Czequestria took place August 21–23, 2015 at the KD Krakov cultural center in Prague. General admission tickets included convention entry, access to live action role-playing game activities, a con book, and a themed lanyard. The highest-tier sponsor badge package also included a special voucher, a limited edition figurine of Poník Libuše (Czequestria's original character pony mascot), a convention poster, and recognition of the sponsor's name in the con book.

Czequestria also hosts a cosplay contest, which was featured in the 2020 documentary Setkání s Libuší (transl. Meeting with Libuša).

== See also ==
- BronyCAN
- BronyCon
- GalaCon
- UK PonyCon
- Vanhoover Pony Expo
- RuBronyCon
- List of My Little Pony fan conventions
