= Fan Expo Boston =

Multi-genre fan convention in the United States

Coordinates: 42°20′44.84″N 71°02′45.28″W

- Status: Active
- Genre: Fan convention
- Venue: Hynes Convention Center (2011–2012); Seaport Hotel and Seaport World Trade Center (2013–2016); Boston Convention and Exhibition Center (2017-Present)
- Location: Boston, Massachusetts
- Country: United States
- Inaugurated: March 18, 2007; 19 years ago
- Most recent: June 28, 2024; 2 years ago
- Next event: August 8, 2025; 14 months ago
- Organizer: Fan Expo HQ/Informa Connect
- Website: www.fanexpoboston.com

Fan Expo Boston, formerly Boston Comic Con, is a multigenre convention held annually in Boston, Massachusetts. Primarily focused on comic books, the convention later featured media guests from film and television, cosplayers, an art auction, a tabletop/CCG/RPG gaming room, and an annual costume contest. After its acquisition by Informa as part of their Fan Expo line, the 2017 edition retired the Comic Con name and was therefore renamed Fan Expo Boston.

== History ==
Founded on March 18, 2007, as a one-day show at the Back Bay Events Center, Boston Comic Con has grown each year and subsequently expanded to two days in 2009 and three days in 2014. The convention moved to the Westin Waterfront Hotel in 2010 and the Hynes Convention Center in 2011. Following a cancellation in April 2013 due to the Boston Marathon bombing, Boston Comic Con relocated to the Seaport Hotel and Seaport World Trade Center in South Boston's seaport district. Immediately following the 2016 convention it was announced that the convention had been sold to London-based Informa, producers of the Fan Expo line of conventions, and would be moving in 2017 to the nearby Boston Convention and Exhibition Center. Despite advertising the 2017 convention as BCC's 10th anniversary, the convention opened as "Fan Expo Boston", with the Comic Con name effectively retired from 2018 onward.

=== Event history ===
Dates	Location	Notes
April 30 - May 1, 2011	Hynes Convention Center; Boston, Massachusetts	Guests included J. Scott Campbell, Sanford Greene, Frank Quitely, Stan Sakai, Scott Wegener
April 21–22, 2012	Hynes Convention Center; Boston, Massachusetts	Guests included Talent Caldwell, Jim Cheung, Amanda Conner, Steve Epting, Phil Jimenez, Ed McGuinness, Phil Noto, Jimmy Palmiotti, Mark Texeira, Billy Tucci, Skottie Young
August 3–4, 2013	Seaport World Trade Center; Boston, Massachusetts	Originally scheduled for April 20–21 at the Hynes Convention Center. Postponed due to Boston bombings
August 8–10, 2014	Seaport World Trade Center; Boston, Massachusetts	Guests included Neal Adams, Sean Astin, John Barrowman, Amanda Conner, Danielle Corsetto, Adam Kubert, James Marsters, Pop Mhan, Jason Momoa, Eve Myles, Jimmy Palmiotti, Stan Sakai, Alex Saviuk, Jewel Staite, Ben Templesmith, Mark Texeira, Mark Waid, Scott Wegener
July 31-August 2, 2015	Seaport World Trade Center; Boston, Massachusetts	Guests included Hayley Atwell, Frank Cho, Amanda Conner, Stan Lee, Jimmy Palmiotti, Cassandra Peterson, Billie Piper, Humberto Ramos, Amy Reeder, Ben Templesmith
August 12–14, 2016	Seaport World Trade Center; Boston, Massachusetts	Guests included Gillian Anderson, John Barrowman, Mark Brooks, John Cassaday, Jenna Coleman, Amanda Conner, Katie Cook, Karen Gillan, Elizabeth Henstridge, Phil Jimenez, Erik Larsen, Jae Lee, David Lloyd (comics), Caity Lotz, Vic Mignogna, Frank Miller, Mike Norton, Jimmy Palmiotti, Dan Parent, Andy Price, Stan Sakai, Tim Seeley, William Shatner, Brian Stelfreeze, Billy Tucci, Karl Urban, Mark Waid, Marv Wolfman
August 11–13, 2017	Boston Convention and Exhibition Center; Boston, Massachusetts	Guests included Neal Adams, Troy Baker, John Barrowman, Nick Bradshaw, Zach Callison, Greg Capullo, Katie Cassidy, Charlet Chung, Jim Cummings, Anthony Daniels, Felicia Day, Eliza Dushku, Kara Eberle, Maile Flanagan, Karen Gillan, Jennifer Hale, Jess Harnell, Phil Jimenez, Stan Lee, Charles Martinet, Jason Mewes, Amanda C. Miller, Trina Nishimura, Nolan North, Bryce Papenbrook, Fernando Ruiz, Kevin Smith, Matt Smith (actor), Ian Somerhalder, Veronica Taylor, Ty Templeton, Alan Tudyk, Karl Urban, Ming-Na Wen, Billy West, Arryn Zech
August 10–12, 2018	Boston Convention and Exhibition Center; Boston, Massachusetts	Guests included Neal Adams, Soni Aralynn, Justin Briner, Zach Callison, J. Scott Campbell, Greg Capullo, Amanda Conner, Michaela Dietz, Dave Dorman, Emma Dumont, Estelle, Joe Flanigan, Michael J. Fox, Jeff Goldblum, Cecil Grimes, Deedee Mango Hall, Yaya Han, Chad Hardin, David Hayter, Richard Horvitz, Amy Jo Johnson, Josh Keaton, Maurice LaMarche, Greg Land, Ken Lashley, Jae Lee, Jim Lee, Christopher Lloyd, Ed McGuinness, Bob McLeod, Jonboy Meyers, Jason Momoa, Mark Morales, Jessica Nigri, Jimmy Palmiotti, Dan Parent, Rob Paulsen, James Phelps, Oliver Phelps, Lucie Pohl, Andy Price, Frank Quitely, Humberto Ramos, Fernando Ruiz, Chris Sabat, Chris Sarandon, Sean Schemmel, Jeremy Shada, William Shatner, Mark Sheppard, Brent Spiner, Jewel Staite, Brian Stelfreeze, Tara Strong, Catherine Tate, Lea Thompson, Billy Tucci, Chris Uminga, LeeAnna Vamp, Billy Dee Williams, Tom Wilson
August 16–18, 2019	Boston Convention and Exhibition Center; Boston, Massachusetts	Guests included Stephen Amell, Sean Astin, Steve Blum, Rodger Bumpass, Peter Capaldi, Greg Capullo, Frank Cho, Roger Clark, Becky Cloonan, Peter Cullen, Grey DeLisle, John DiMaggio, Jason David Frank, Will Friedle, Todd Haberkorn, Laurie Holden, Jody Houser, Zachary Levi, Vanessa Marshall, Todd McFarlane, Phil Noto, Paige O'Hara, Edward James Olmos, Bryce Papenbrook, Dan Parent, Marc Silvestri, Gail Simone, Dan Slott, Patricia Summersett, Fred Tatasciore, Ty Templeton, Mark Texeira, Cristina Vee.
~~August 7–9, 2020~~	Boston Convention and Exhibition Center; Boston, Massachusetts	Cancelled due to the COVID-19 pandemic
September 3–5, 2021	Boston Convention and Exhibition Center; Boston, Massachusetts	Originally scheduled for August 6–8
August 12–14, 2022	Boston Convention and Exhibition Center; Boston, Massachusetts	Guests included Zach Aguilar, Jeff Anderson, Sean Astin, Billy Boyd, Justin Briner, Gina Carano, C.B. Cebulski, Clifford Chapin, Frank Cho, Anthony Daniels, John de Lancie, Dan DiDio, Steve Downes, Ashley Eckstein, Giancarlo Esposito, Trevor Fehrman, Jonathan Frakes, Will Friedle, Michael Golden, Chloé Hollings, Martin Kove, Kristin Kreuk, Matthew Lewis, Jeph Loeb, Kevin Maguire, David Matranga, Ewan McGregor, Ed McGuinness, Kristen McGuire, Bob McLeod, Steve McNiven, Jason Mewes, Frank Miller, Dominic Monaghan, Nolan North, Brian O'Halloran, Ken Page, Bryce Papenbrook, Dan Parent, Joe Quesada Carolina Ravassa, Tone Rodriguez, Christy Carlson Romano, Michael Rosenbaum, Josef Rubinstein, Chris Sarandon, Alex Saviuk, Kevin Smith, Arthur Suydam, David Tennant, Alexis Tipton, Cristina Vee, Tom Welling, Ming-Na Wen, Keith Williams, Renée Witterstaetter, Elijah Wood, William Zabka
August 4–6, 2023	Boston Convention and Exhibition Center; Boston, Massachusetts	Ashley Eckstein, Charles Martinet, Danny Trejo, Emily Swallow, Hayden Christensen, Henry Winkler, Jason Lee, Morena Baccarin, Peter Cullen, Tara Strong, William Shatner, & Zachary Levi
June 14–16, 2024	Hynes Convention Center; Boston, Massachusetts	Alan Tudyk, Ashley Eckstein, Beverly D'Angelo, Bryce Dallas Howard, Butch Hartman, Cameron Monaghan, Charlie Cox, Chevy Chase, Dana Barron, Dee Bradley Baker, Ethan Suplee, Holly Marie Combs, Jodi Benson, Mads Mikkelsen, Mario Lopez, Marisa Tomei, Randy Quaid, Rob Paulsen, Roger Craig Smith, Rosario Dawson, Rose McGowan, Sam Raimi, Sean Gunn, Temuera Morrison & Vincent D'Onofrio
August 8–10, 2025	Boston Convention and Exhibition Center; Boston, Massachusetts	Alexander Calvert, Arden Cho, Bob West, Bubba Ray Dudley, Catherine Tate, Christopher Mintz-Plasse, D-Von Dudley, Dante Basco, DJ Qualls, Ewan McGregor, Giancarlo Esposito, Greg Baldwin, Hayden Christensen, Helen Hunt, Jared Padalecki, Jason Isaacs, Jennifer Beals, Jim Beaver, John Boyega, John Cena, John Rhys-Davies, Lucas Grabeel, Manny Jacinto, Mark Pellegrino, Mark Sheppard, Michaela Jill Murphy, Rob Van Dam, Ruth Connell, Samantha Smith, Simon Pegg, Temuera Morrison & Troy Baker
August 7-9, 2026	Thomas Michael Menino Convention and Exhibition Center; Boston, Massachusetts	Ashley Greene, Billy Boyd, Brent Spiner, Cameron Crovetti, Chris Evans, Christian Borle, Christopher Judge, Colby Minifie, Colin O'Donoghue, Corey Feldman, Dafne Keen, Danny Glover, David Wenham, Dean Norris, Dominic Monaghan, Elijah Wood, Erica Durance, Erin Moriarty, Frank Grillo, Gates McFadden, Henry Ian Cusick, Jackson Rathbone, James Marsters, Jamison Newlander, Jason Marsden, Joel Perez, John Noble, John Rhys-Davies, Jonathan Frakes, Josh Holloway, Judith Hoag, Karen Fukuhara, Karl Urban, Kellan Lutz, Kerri Green, Kristin Kreuk, Krystina Alabado, Laz Alonso, Lilli Cooper, Mara Wilson, Martha Plimpton, Mel Gibson, Michael Rosenbaum, Mike Colter, Miranda Otto, Omri Katz, Orlando Bloom, Peter Facinelli, Rob Colletti, Sean Astin, Tom Welling, Valorie Curry, Vinessa Shaw & William Shatner

== Notable events ==
Chef Paul Wahlberg filmed a segment of his reality show Wahlburgers (episode six of season three) at Boston Comic Con on Friday, August 1, 2014, which aired on Wednesday, February 11, 2015.

Guests Manu Bennett, Jimmy Palmiotti, Amanda Conner, Brian Azzarello and more appeared alongside several cosplayers at Fenway Park for the Boston Red Sox's inaugural "Boston Comic Con Night" on July 30, 2015.

Mayor Marty Walsh appeared on August 1, 2015, to declare Stan Lee Day in Boston in honor of Stan Lee's appearance at Boston Comic Con.
