= My Little Pony (IDW Publishing) =

Series of comic books based on the Hasbro franchise

My Little Pony: Friendship Is Magic
- Cover of Issue 4, art by Amanda Conner

Publication information
- Publisher: IDW Publishing
- Schedule: Monthly
- Format: Ongoing series
- Genre: Humor/comedy
- Publication date: November 28, 2012 – January 29, 2025
- No. of issues: 102 (main series); 10 (Micro Series); 38 (Friends Forever); 12 (Legends of Magic); 5 (Ponyville Mysteries); 4 (Nightmare Knights); 5 (FIENDship Is Magic); 4 (Annual Edition); 3 (Holiday Special); 1 (Deviations); 4 (Movie Prequel); 3 (Spirit of the Forest); 3 (Feats of Friendship); 5 (Generations); 4 (Classics Reimagined: Little Fillies); 5 (Camp Bighoof); 4 (Classics Reimagined: The Unicorn of Odd); 5 (Kenbucky Roller Derby); 5 (Set Your Sail); 4 (Maretime Mysteries); 3 (The Storm of Zephyr Heights)
- Main characters: Cast of My Little Pony: Friendship Is Magic

Creative team
- Written by: Katie Cook (issues 1–4, 9–12, 17–20, 25−28, 41−42); Heather Nuhfer (issues 5–8, 13–16); Ted Anderson (issues 21−22, 29, 40, 46−50, 61−62); Jeremy Whitley (issues 23–24, 34−37, 50); Christina Rice (issues 30−31, 38−39, 55−56, 59−60, 63); Thom Zahler (issues 32−33, 43−45, 57−58, 64–65); James Asmus (issues 51−53); Rob Anderson (issue 54)
- Artist(s): Andy Price (issues 1–4, 9–12, 17–20, 25–28, 34–37, 41−42, 48−50, 61−62, 64–65); Katie Cook (issues 1, 4, 10, 11–12, 17–20, 25, 27−28); Amy Mebberson (issues 5–8, 15–16, 23); Brenda Hickey (issues 13–14, 24, 40, 63); Agnes Garbowska (issues 21–22, 30–31, 38–39, 46−47, 55−56, 58−60); Jay Fosgitt (issues 29, 50, 54); Tony Fleecs (issues 32–33, 43–45, 51−53, 57)
- Letterer(s): Robbie Robbins (issues 1–2); Neil Uyetake (issues 3−34, 36−present); Gilberto Lazcano (issue 35)
- Colorist(s): Heather Breckel (issues 1–20, 23–29, 32–37, 42−45, 48−65); Agnes Garbowska (issues 21–22, 30–31, 38–39, 46−47); Amy Mebberson (issue 23); Sara Richard (issues 23, 25); Bill Forster (issues 21–22); Brenda Hickey (issues 24, 40); Lauren Perry (assist) (issues 21−22, 30−31, 38–39, 46−47); Andy Price (issue 41)
- Editor: Bobby Curnow

IDW Publishing, an American comic publisher which published tie-in comic books to Hasbro properties from 2005 to 2025, began to publish monthly My Little Pony comics from November 2012 to January 2025. The comics are primarily based on the characters from the 2010 relaunch of the franchise and its television series My Little Pony: Friendship Is Magic, as well as the spin-off Equestria Girls. Beginning in 2022, many of the comics also feature the characters from the fifth generation of the franchise and its associated television series My Little Pony: Make Your Mark.

The flagship monthly publication, My Little Pony: Friendship Is Magic, ran for 102 issues from November 2012 to October 2021, and was succeeded by My Little Pony, based on the fifth iteration of the franchise, which ran for 20 issues from May 2022 to December 2023. The release of the main series titles is typically accompanied by one or several secondary monthly titles. In addition to these publications, IDW has also published several one-off issues.

The comics follow the studious Twilight Sparkle (originally a unicorn, later given a pair of wings) and her friends in adventures throughout the empire of Equestria. Though the comic, like the TV series, is aimed at young children, the writers and artists have consistently taken risks, including expanding Sombra's storyline, the Friendship is Magic miniseries, introducing little violence, and more. They have been well received, having presented complex, multi-issue story arcs, and included material to appeal to the broad older fandom, featuring cultural references and show elements enjoyed by them.

The first issue saw more than 100,000 pre-orders prior to its release, making it one of the best-selling comics of both the month and the year, requiring IDW to issue a second printing; it was only one of two non-DC or non-Marvel comics to be in the top 100 comics sold in 2012. Subsequent issues were monthly best sellers and represented IDW's highest-selling property. Journalists in the comic industry noted that with the older fans likely buying comics for the first time in many years, along with child fans purchasing comic books for the first time, the success of the My Little Pony comic could aid the ailing industry. The first issue was highly praised for capturing the spirit of the characters and presentation of the show while providing a good introduction to its mythos for those who were unfamiliar with it.

In October 2025, Boom! Studios announced it had acquired the license for My Little Pony. Boom! Studios also launched a Kickstarter for a five-hardcover set of the IDW comics titled My Little Pony: Friendship Is Magic Rainbow Collection on March 31, 2026.

== Concept and creation ==
Hasbro's My Little Pony franchise, started in the 1980s, has had several animated television series and direct-to-video movies to help promote and sell the associated toy line collection; over the years, there have been five "generations" of designs and associated characters and setting. In 2010, Hasbro aimed to relaunch the My Little Pony line, following the recent success of the re-envisioning of the Transformers franchise, and brought in animator Lauren Faust as the creative developer for the show; in addition to developing the looks and characters to be featured in the toy line, Faust was also tasked with creating a new tie-in show as to provide programming for its new cable network, The Hub (now Discovery Family; owned by Discovery Communications and Hasbro). Faust's previous experience on shows like The Powerpuff Girls and Foster's Home for Imaginary Friends led to her developing a show that would have cross-generational appeal to young girls and the parents that would watch the show with them. Her characters were designed to challenge the norm of girl stereotypes while still keeping the archetypes as familiar figures. Faust worked with several former co-writers from her previous shows (including her husband and animator Craig McCracken), and with the directors at DHX Media's 2D animation studio (formerly Studio B Productions) in Vancouver, British Columbia, where the show would be produced to fill out the world.

The resulting show, My Little Pony: Friendship Is Magic, was well received by parents, but found another unexpected target audience through the Internet photo-board, 4chan, primarily adult males from 13 to 35 years old. Quickly expanding through the Internet, the fandom came to use the term "brony" (a portmanteau of "bro" and "pony") to describe themselves. The brony fandom is attributed to Faust and her creative team for including strong characters, cross-generational appeal, cultural references, the show's expressive Flash-based animation, and the ability for the showrunners to communicate and reciprocate with the fandom, such as including fan-derived elements within the show. Hasbro was also caught off-guard by this surprise demographic but have come to embrace it, using licensing deals to market clothes, media, and other merchandise beyond the toys to the older audience.

One such avenue was the creation of a comic series; there had previously been no mass-market My Little Pony comics, albeit it does have "stock comics" featured in various licensed children's magazines such as Sparkle World, which even continues to do so. Hasbro's Director of Global Publishing Michael Kelly had introduced the idea to Hasbro following success of IDW Publishing's publications of G.I. Joe and Transformers comics, where it initially met some skepticism. Kelly and IDW helped to show internally that the current iteration of the My Little Pony show was readily transferred to comics due to its style and humor. Hasbro and IDW announced its licensing deal at San Diego Comic-Con in July 2012. Katie Cook and Andy Price were announced as the first arc's writer and illustrator, respectively; Cook had previous experience at both DC Comics and Marvel Comics, along with her own webcomic "Gronk", while Price had been involved with DC and the Batman Archives series. Cook stated that she has been a My Little Pony fan from the first generation of toys, and found that with this series, "the characters are strong and lovable, the stories are well-written, and there's an underlying sense of humor to the show that's very hip", making it a "great all-ages property".

Cook aimed to write the stories for the comic to be something that she herself would enjoy "as a Pony fan and an all-ages writer", and planned to continue in the spirit of the show, avoiding the feel of a "freebie Barbie comic" that would otherwise be packaged with toys. She further stated that she wanted to write an all-ages book, something that parents can share and read with their children. Like the show, she had included pop cultural references that adults will get, but does not try to shoehorn these in. She used the first four-story arc as a means for herself to get comfortable in writing for the characters, thus bringing back an established villain as the antagonist for the first story. Cook does plan to introduce new characters and settings in later issues. She noted that the first story includes dark and scary elements, but she does not consider them any darker than the show itself. At the 2013 San Diego Comic-Con, Cook commented that in considering how dark to take the stories, "My personal gauge is Dark Crystal. If it's darker than the Skeksis sucking the life out of a Podling, I don't go there." Though normally Cook would write and draw her own comics, her work in the My Little Pony comic was her first foray into writing out a script and directing others to draw out the art. She expressed pleasure at working with Price has they have worked well together in the past. However, Cook does continue to do some of the art; the first issue contains a short two-page comic written and drawn by herself.

Price himself is influenced by works of comic artists including Don Newton and José Luis García-López. He himself includes some of the pop cultural references within the art beyond those written in by Cook. Price noted that his popularity, measured by Twitter followed, grew explosively after the comic's announcement, and compares working on the comic to his previous efforts at DC and Marvel, "being the artist on this book is an experience completely unlike any other".

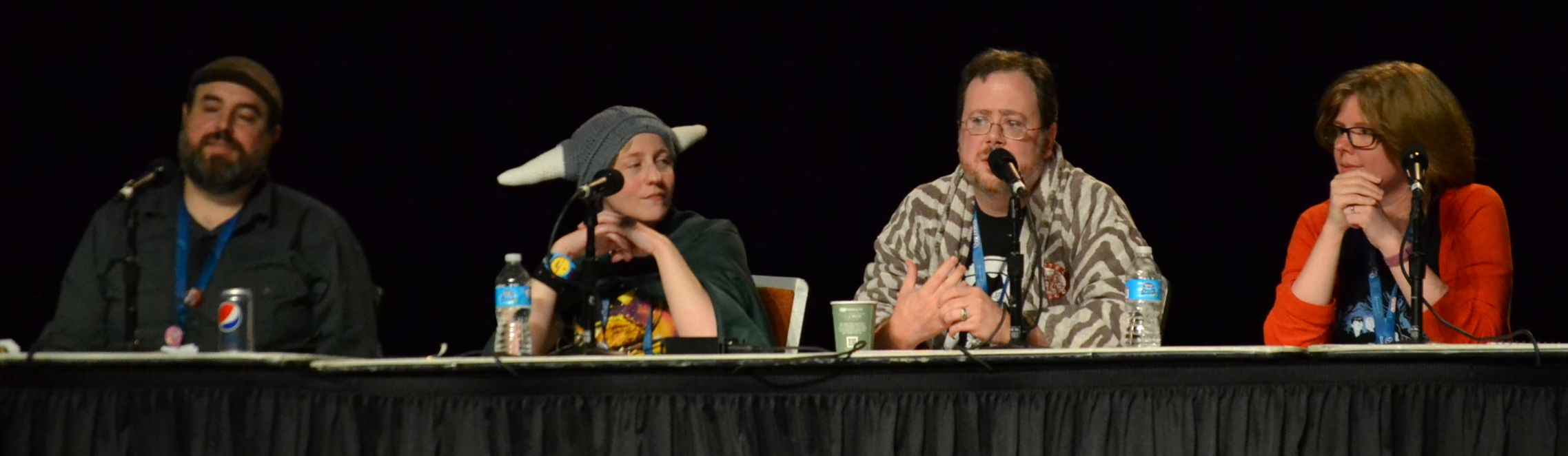
Friendship Is Magic artists Tony Fleecs (left), Heather Breckel, Andy Price, and Katie Cook at the 2014 BronyCon Convention

Price has stated that Hasbro does give them freedom to write and draw the comic as they see fit, typically only asking for changes to achieve "a little bit more show accuracy". In one case, they had a story planned that Hasbro told them was being done within the show, and had to scrap it; in another case, they had initially planned to open the first issue with the Cutie Mark Crusaders camping, but found that the show already had a similar scene, within the Season 3 episode "Sleepless in Ponyville", and altered these pages for something different. Other elements of the show have been considered "off limits" for the comics until blessed by Hasbro; the villain Discord was considered one of these until the start of Season 4 of the show which changed aspects of his character, after which Hasbro allowed the comic to use the character. Price states they tried to keep their novel stories "copacetic" with the show, giving them the chance to take some risks; he stated that Hasbro was initially "scared to death" with their "Reflections" arc, which incorporates many science fiction elements such as alternate universe, but ended up pleased with the result.

== Characters and continuity ==
The comics take place in the same fictional universe as the television show, in the land of Equestria which is populated primarily by ponies (including unicorns and pegasi), along with numerous other sentient and non-sentient creatures. The primary characters of the comic include:

- Twilight Sparkle, a studious unicorn (later alicorn) gifted in magic, who has come to learn the value of friendship since arriving in Ponyville.
- Spike, a baby dragon and Twilight's assistant, who uses his fire breath to send Twilight's messages back and forth to her mentor, Princess Celestia.
- Applejack, a hard-working earth pony in charge of her family's apple orchard, Sweet Apple Acres.
- Fluttershy, a timid pegasus with a fondness for animals.
- Pinkie Pie, a hyperactive earth pony who loves to throw parties.
- Rainbow Dash, a tomboyish pegasus who helps set Ponyville's weather and dreams of joining the Wonderbolts aeronautics team.
- Rarity, a glamorous unicorn clothing designer who runs her own boutique.
- The younger Cutie Mark Crusaders, consisting of Apple Bloom (earth pony; Applejack's younger sister), Sweetie Belle (unicorn; Rarity's younger sister), and Scootaloo (a pegasus that idolizes Rainbow Dash), who are in a hurry to get their cutie marks that show what their talent is for life.

The series provides stories based on the established fictional universe of Friendship Is Magic TV series; the comic usually follows the TV series' canon, but the show does not technically follow comic canon.

== Publications ==
In addition to monthly single issue releases, IDW has also published collected volumes covering the individual story arcs.

=== Friendship Is Magic (November 2012 – October 2021) ===
The flagship title, My Little Pony: Friendship Is Magic, was a monthly comic book series that debuted on November 28, 2012. The series was typically written in story arcs that span either two or four issues apiece; Katie Cook and Andy Price write and illustrate the first arc, respectively, while Heather Nuhfer and Amy Mebberson perform the same on the second.

Friendship Is Magic chronologically occurred alongside the TV series, featuring characters and elements introduced in later seasons. For example, the first four-issue story includes the return of Queen Chrysalis of the Changelings, a major villain introduced in "A Canterlot Wedding", the finale of the TV series' season 2. As of issue #13, Twilight Sparkle is depicted to also have a pair of wings with her form change as depicted in the finale of TV series' season 3 "Magical Mystery Cure", reflecting the product changes happened in 2013.

At the 2019 New York Comic Con, IDW revealed that it would be continuing the show during 2020, which completed its ninth and final season in October 2019, with a proverbial "Season 10" of the show, a continuation in the same fashion of Dark Horse's Buffy the Vampire Slayer Season Eight and IDW's The X-Files Season 10. The issues will be developed in collaboration with Hasbro and would include having both a large arc interspersed among slice-of-life stories. "Season 10" started with issue #89 of the comic, released on August 12, 2020. IDW had later announced on June 21, 2021, that issue #102 will conclude the run of the Friendship Is Magic series in October 2021.

=== Secondary publications ===
A secondary monthly publication accompanied Friendship Is Magic since February 2013.

==== Micro-series (February 2013 – December 2013) ====
My Little Pony: Micro-series is a companion series of single-issue stories that each focus on a single main character. It ran between February and December 2013 for 10 issues. IDW had originally planned to publish six issues, one for each pony in Twilight Sparkle's circle of friends; however, their success prompted Curnow to state that the series would be extended to feature supporting characters from the TV series. The micro-series ended after issue #10, replaced by another series subtitled Friends Forever that began in January 2014.

Micro-series was an idea born out from comic writer Thom Zahler. At the time of the main comic series announcement at the 2012 Comic-Con, Zahler had interest in doing cover art for the series, and approached IDW editor Bobby Curnow at the Con about his interest. Curnow later contacted Zahler and asked him to pitch stories for a smaller series; one such pitch included a crossover with Mars Attacks! penned during a convention panel in Baltimore. Though Zahler had pitched stories for all the main characters, he ultimately was the author for the Twilight comic. Zahler stated that prior to the comics he had seen a few episodes, and considered the characters as developed by Faust to be "wonderfully represented" and that the show itself had "a very classic cartoon element" that made cross-generational writing easy to do. Cook herself wrote the third micro-issue featuring Rarity, and saw the single-issue format as more like "episodes of the TV show" compared to the larger arcs of the main series, and can be "slice-of-life stories that really explore the character" without bringing in the full cast. Various writers and artists were involved with the other issues.

==== Friends Forever (January 2014 – April 2017) ====
The monthly Friends Forever series consisted of single-issue stories, each focusing on a different pair of characters, including the main cast as well as fan-popular minor and background characters. Series editor Bobby Curnow compared the concepts of these stories to buddy comedies, allowing them to explore other characters and give various fan-favorite characters the chance to be in the limelight of a story. Alex de Campi penned the first issue. The Friends Forever series debuted in January 2014 and ended in April 2017 after 38 issues.

==== Legends of Magic (April 2017 – March 2018) ====
The Legends of Magic series replaced the Friends Forever series starting in April 2017 and running through March 2018 for a total of 12 issues, with an annual for the series being released in April 2018. It focuses on stories that cover the mythological history of Equestria and development of magic in the land that had been only briefly touched on within the animated series, such as the character of Star Swirl the Bearded and other key figures. Such figures featured in this arc also starred in the TV series, including the finale of season 7 "Shadow Play" and a few episodes in subsequent seasons.

==== Ponyville Mysteries (May 2018 – September 2018) ====
The Ponyville Mysteries mini-series began in May 2018 and ran until September 2018 for a total of five issues. Like the series of chapter books of the same name published by LB Kids, each issue follows the Cutie Mark Crusaders as they solve mysteries around Ponyville.

==== Nightmare Knights (October 2018 – March 2019) ====
The Nightmare Knights mini-series ran from October 2018 to March 2019 for a total of five issues. The series centers around Princess Luna forming a team consisting of fellow reformed villains to deal with a new threat to Equestria.

==== Spirit of the Forest (May 2019 – August 2019) ====
The Spirit of the Forest mini-series ran from May 2019 to August 2019 for a total of three issues. It follows the Cutie Mark Crusaders as they try to figure out why the Everfree forest is filling up with trash, and solve the mystery behind the strange behavior of the ponies in Ponyville.

==== Feats of Friendship (August 2019 – November 2019) ====
The Feats of Friendship mini-series ran from August 2019 to November 2019 for a total of three issues. It centers around the Young Six as they compete in an athletic event at the School of Friendship and make a mysterious new friend.

==== Generations (October 2021 – February 2022) ====
The Generations mini series ran from October 2021 to February 2022 for a total of five issues. It centers around Twilight and her friends teaming up with the first generation ponies as they face a new threat from the Volcano of Gloom.

==== My Little Pony (May 2022 – December 2023) ====
The My Little Pony series, which was the first comic series based on the fifth generation of the franchise, ran from May 2022 to December 2023 for a total of twenty issues. It centers around Sunny and her friends as they discover the ruins of Canterlot and embark on a quest to stop Discord from destroying pony magic.

==== Classics Reimagined: Little Fillies (November 2022 – February 2023) ====
The Classics Reimagined: Little Fillies mini series ran from October 2022 to February 2023 for a total of four issues. It centers around a retelling of Louisa May Alcott's classic novel Little Women with Twilight Sparkle, Rainbow Dash, Rarity and Fluttershy as the March sisters.

==== Camp Bighoof (July 2023 – December 2023) ====
The Camp Bighoof mini series ran from July to December 2023 for a total of five issues. It centers on the Mane Five from A New Generation opening a summer camp to teach foals about the usage of magic and the hijinks of a mysterious cryptid lurking nearby.

==== Classics Reimagined: The Unicorn of Odd (August 2023 – December 2023) ====
The Classics Reimagined: The Unicorn of Odd mini series ran from August to December 2023 for a total of four issues. It centers around a retelling of L. Frank Baum's classic novel The Wonderful Wizard of Oz with Applejack playing the role of Dorothy.

==== Kenbucky Roller Derby (January 2024 – June 2024) ====
The Kenbucky Roller Derby mini series will run for a total of five issues from January to June 2024. It centers around the Mane Six from A New Generation as they form a roller derby team to compete in a national competition alongside a disgraced former champion.

==== Set Your Sail (April 2024 – August 2024) ====
The Set Your Sail mini series ran for a total of five issues from April to August 2024. It sees the Mane Six from A New Generation as they are transformed into Seaponies and explore the mythical underwater kingdom alongside a ragtag gang of pirates.

==== Maretime Mysteries (June 2024 – September 2024) ====
The Maretime Mysteries mini series began in June 2024 and ended in September 2024 with a total of four issues. It follows the adventures of Misty, Sunny, Hitch, and Sparky when a Maretime Bay mystery board game mysteriously comes to life.

==== The Storm of Zephyr Heights (September 2024 – November 2024) ====
The Storm of Zephyr Heights mini series began in September 2024. It ran for three issues. It centers around the Mane Six of Generation 5 as they must stop a powerful storm from destroying Zephyr Heights.

=== One-shots ===
Five additional 48-page comics have been released to date, under the title My Little Pony Annual.

- The first served as a tie-in to the 2013 direct-to-video film My Little Pony: Equestria Girls; published on October 30, 2013, it contains two prequel stories set before the events of that film.
- The second, published on September 24, 2014, is an offshoot of "Power Ponies," an episode from the fourth season of the Friendship Is Magic television series.
- The third served as a tie-in to the 2014 direct-to-video film Equestria Girls: Rainbow Rocks, published on December 17, 2014, it contains two sequel stories set after the events of that film.
- The fourth, published on March 1, 2017, carries the subtitle Guardians of Harmony and consists of six 8-page stories that center on a changeling invasion of Equestria.
- The fifth, published on April 28, 2021, carries the subtitle The Two Kingdoms of Caninia and centers on Rarity and friends as they travel to the kingdom of the Diamond Dogs and try to fix a broken friendship between six royal sisters.

A 32-page Holiday Special comic was published on December 2, 2015. Twilight Sparkle and Spike find themselves stranded at a train station due to heavy snow and pass the time by reading Hearth's Warming stories. Two more holiday specials have since been published; one in 2017 and one in 2019.

A 40-page Deviations comic was published on March 8, 2017, presenting a timeline in which Princess Celestia chooses Prince Blueblood instead of Twilight as her personal student. This latter issue is part of a five-week series of one-shot comics, in which each issue explores an alternate timeline in a different IDW universe.

On December 21, 2022, a one shot comic celebrating the tenth anniversary of the comic series was released. The one shot contains a reprint of the first issue, a cover art gallery, an interview with Tony Fleecs and a new short story.

On July 12, 2023, a special comic was published to commemorate the series' 40th anniversary, which collects three stories celebrating the love of ponies set in both the real world and the My Little Pony world.

On January 29, 2025, a 38 page one shot comic titled My Little Pony: Rise of Cadance was published in which Princess Cadance reflects on her life before the events of the series. The comic reveals key elements of Cadance's origin from infancy to her ascension as an alicorn.

=== Other publications ===
My Little Pony: FIENDship Is Magic, a five-issue series published weekly during April 2015, focused on the backstories of major antagonists appeared in Friendship Is Magic TV series, plus the Sirens, a trio of villains who appeared in Equestria Girls: Rainbow Rocks.

My Little Pony: The Movie Prequel, a four-issue series published monthly from June to September 2017, focused on the backstories of supporting characters in My Little Pony: The Movie from 2017.

IDW has published two crossover series between Friendship Is Magic and Transformers, each consisting of four monthly issues. The first, Friendship in Disguise, ran from August to November 2020; the second, The Magic of Cybertron, ran from April to July 2021.

A 28-page Endless Summer comic was published on August 30, 2023, which tells the story of Sunny Starscout and her friends learning to let go of summer. It came as part of a series of comics exploring summer themes in different IDW universes.

== Marketing ==
The first issue of My Little Pony: Friendship Is Magic was marketed by IDW by creating nineteen unique cover variants. Six of the covers, drawn by Price, feature each of the main cast, and form a continuous six-panel work. IDW will publish a boxed set of these covers separately. The other covers are unique to specific comic stores and Internet retailers such as Midtown Comics and Lone Star Comics, and are available as pre-order bonuses for purchasers. The second issue will also have several, but fewer, store-specific variants. Subsequent comics, including those in the micro-series, have typically had between two and four additional vendor-specific variants.

IDW published limited copies of each of the micro-series in a "comicfolio", containing the comic with one of the limited edition covers, a lithograph, and other materials in a hard-paper binding; the presentation would also be extended to other micro-series they are publishing including for Teenage Mutant Ninja Turtles. IDW also published limited hardcover runs of the first four issues of the main series in six varieties, each featuring one of the main pony characters; the sets included art prints and collectable cards related to that specific character.

Within North America, the comic series are available digitally through both the iTunes Music Store and Comixology. In the United Kingdom, the series has become published digitally through a mobile app created by Made in Me, alongside other children's comics. Motion comics of the My Little Pony series and other IDW properties were published through a licensing deal with Madefire, as announced at the 2013 San Diego Comic-Con with releases starting in August 2013.

A "micro fun pack" version of the comics have also been developed by IDW; these packs feature pages from the comic reprinted on collectable cards, along with stickers, posters, and tattoos, for sale in larger retail stores. IDW believes these will help further attract children to the comic and have plans to do this with another ongoing series, Teenage Mutant Ninja Turtles and more in the future. The first printing of 150,000 sets were fully sold out by retailers after they were announced. As of July 2014, IDW has sold more than half a million of these packs, and have taken steps to trademark the line as well as expand to include their Skylanders comic series.

== Reception ==
The first issue of My Little Pony: Friendship Is Magic received favorable commentary by comic reviewers. Dan Hart for Bleeding Cool News, who had not previously seen the show, praised Cook's script for quickly introducing the characters and the world, and Price's ability with facial expressions. Hart stated that he had "the same feeling of light-hearted fun as [he] got from (the much-missed) Tiny Titans and that's no bad thing". Mike Fahey of Kotaku further praised the ability of the comic to surpass some of the visual aspects of the television show, noting that the main characters "are more expressive and dynamic than their television counterparts, aided by black outlines that contrast strikingly with the show's colored ones", while the writing style captured the characters' personalities. Dakster Sullivan, writing for Wired's GeekMom column, further praised Cook and Price for doing "an amazing job bringing the spirit of the characters from the small screen to the comic book world". Comic Book Resources's Jennifer Cheng was positive of the issue, though she noted that the comic itself was weakened by the established nature of the television show. However, she praised that "Cook and Price's enthusiasm and skill" helped to overcome the predictability of the show, making it "a lot better than it needs to be for a property with an existing, devoted fanbase". Paste considered that while the first four-issue comic arc did not quite reach the humor of Adventure Time, it "still bustles with passion, fun, and personality despite a few rough edges". Bleeding Cool magazine placed Katie Cook as one of the top 100 Power List people in the comic book industry for 2013 for her contribution to the success of the My Little Pony series.

According to IDW, the first issue had reached over 90,000 pre-orders by October 2012 and exceeded 100,000 just before its release; most single issues of comics do not see sales in excess of 10,000 to 12,000, particularly for publishers other than DC Comics or Marvel, according to Price. In light of this number, IDW announced plans to run a second printing of the first comic along with the collectible box set in December, and ultimately ended up reprinting the issue four times. The large number of pre-orders for an all-ages comic has been considered a boom for the comics industry; the pre-order numbers exceeded those for other, more traditional comics like DC's The New 52 and Marvel NOW! relaunches, putting it on track to be one of the best-selling issues for 2012. As many of the purchasers of these comics are likely to be first-time comic buyers, the comic's success may also filter to improved sales of other comic titles. Total sales of the standalone first issue, as tracked by Diamond Comic Distributors, exceeded 80,000 units, making it the fifteen best comic for the month and an uncommon occurrence of a non-DC, non-Marvel comic breaking the top 20, according to Russ Burlingane of ComicBook.com. The first issue of Friendship Is Magic was one of only two non-DC/Marvel publications (the other being The Walking Dead #100) to be in the top 100 issue quantity sales for 2012, ranked at #90, and ranked #61 based on revenue. According to Heather Nuhfer and Amy Mebberson, the first issue of the comic is the best-selling issue published by IDW as of March 2013. John Mayo of Comic Book Resources points out that even with lower sales figures, the 7th issue of the comic sold more than three times the number of copies of the combined Star Trek and Doctor Who IDW-licensed and fan-heavy series, and believes that "whatever IDW is doing to promote My Little Pony is working". The success of My Little Pony and other children's comics like Adventure Time help to boosting overall sales in the comics industry by 15% in 2012.

By October 2013, a total of one million copies across both series, including reprints and collected editions, have been sold at retail, according to IDW. Adams also states that digital sales remain strong, with the comics often holding spots within the top 10 selling books on the iTunes Stores. To celebrate the milestone, a special variant cover of issue #12, drawn by Price and limited to twelve copies, was printed and auctioned or given away as prizes, while only a single copy of another variant cover of the same issue, drawn by Sara Richard, was published and later auctioned by IDW and Heritage Auctions in August 2014. The issue sold for more than $6,500 with Richard's original art selling for more than $3,500.

Subsequent issues placed within the top 100 monthly sales charts as recorded by Diamond, and represented the top selling IDW comic in these months. The second issue ranked at #54 in December 2012 sales. The third issue and the first micro-series placed at #45 and #62, respectively in the February 2013 charts. In March, the fourth and fifth issue and the second micro-series placed at #55, #65, and #91, respectively. Similar placement numbers within the top 100 were held between April and July 2013. The first four-issue trade paperback was the seventh top selling such book in May 2013. The first collected volume featuring the Queen Chrysalis arc won the 2013 Diamond Comic Best Trade Paperback/Hardback award. The main series was named as the Best All-Ages Comic by Diamond Comic Distributors for their 2014 Gem Awards.

The IDW comics are credited with helping to get young children interested again in reading; Hasbro's Director of Global Publishing, Michael Kelly, has heard stories from comic shop owners who have seen young girls in their shops for the first time in years, a facet later noted by IDW's CEO Ted Adams. Adams further noted that while many of the direct sales of the comics go to the older audience, the sales for young children are significant and have helped to expand the variety of the demographics of its customers. ComicsAlliance named the My Little Pony series as the 2013 "Best In-Your-Face To Opponents of All-Ages Comics", citing that the series "hold[s] up well enough for adults ... but more importantly are also accessible and fun for kids". The success of the My Little Pony series along with other Hasbro properties that IDW prints, like Transformers and G.I. Joe, has led the two companies to review Hasbro's catalog and consider other titles, particularly those from the 1980s, that could successfully be brought to comic form.
