= The Stubby Shillelaghs =

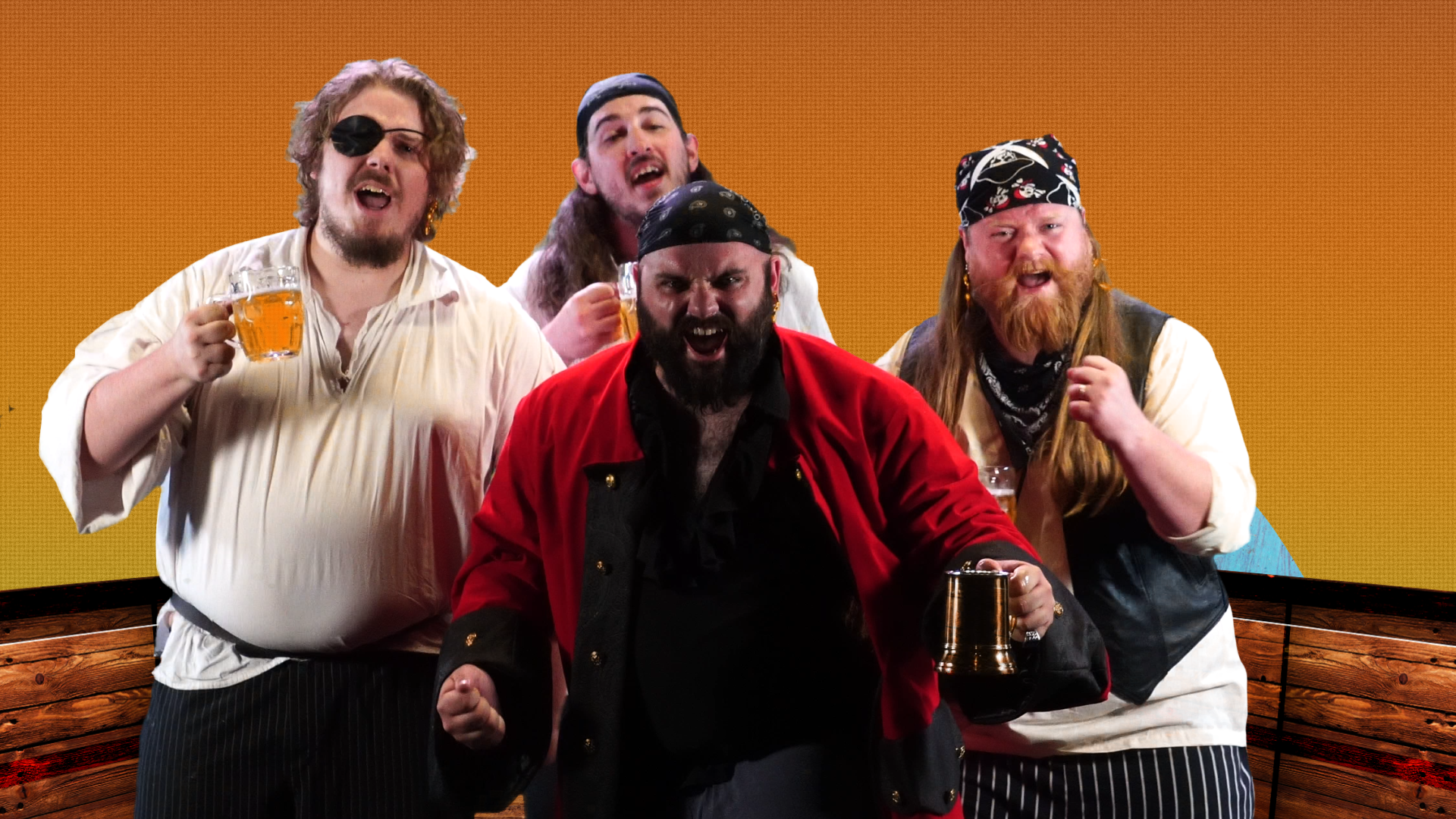

Background information
- Years active: 2010-Present
- Label: Crunchtronic Records
- Members: Eric Fischer, Ryan Knaub, Shaughnessy McDaniel, Andrew Mithun
- Past members: Jacquelyn McConnell
- Website: https://thestubbyshillelaghs.wixsite.com/stubby-shillelaghs

The Stubby Shillelaghs are a Celtic folk band from Greeley, Colorado. The band currently consists of four members: Eric Fischer, Ryan Knaub, Shaughnessy McDaniel, and Andrew Mithun.

Formed in 2010, the band started as a joke among Andrew Mithun, Shaughnessy McDaniel, and Ryan Knaub, but after their first gig, they secured a long-term slot at the local pub in Greeley, playing weekly shows to packed crowds. The band, nicknamed "Stubbies," plays a combination of traditional Celtic music, original acoustic tunes, and contemporary covers. They have released seven albums (five studio, two live), one EP, and one single since their formation in 2010.

The Stubbies are part of a resurgence of Celtic Music in the Western United States that started with bands like The Young Dubliners, Flogging Molly and continued into the 2010s with bands like Lexington Field. They have also crossed over into the pop culture world with their album "Critical Fail" and appearances with The Doubleclicks at the kick-off for 2014's Denver Pop Culture Con.

== History ==
The Stubby Shillelaghs formed in 2010 when long-time friends Andrew Mithun, Ryan Knaub, and Shaughnessy McDaniel played their first show at the local pub in their hometown of Greeley, Colorado. This led to a 5-year stretch of shows at the pub referred to by locals as "Stubby Tuesdays". During this time they met up with violin player Jackie McConnell and recorded their first two albums, "Stubbies Assemble," and "Whiskey Business." Jackie left the band in 2012 to pursue other projects. The band continued shortly as a trio before bringing new violinist Eric Fischer to the band in early 2013.

In 2013 the band released its third studio album, "Celtic-American" which featured fellow Celtic folk musician Marc Gunn on the title track. The album was warmly received but did not reach the level of success that "Whiskey Business" achieved. For 2014 and 2015 they played opening and supporting events for Denver Pop Culture Con and continued playing at pubs in the Greeley, Fort Collins, Denver, and Colorado Springs areas. They also opened for The Kyle Gass Band, uniting them with one of their idols from Tenacious D.

In 2015 as the band was on the verge of releasing "Critical Fail" when they decided to retire. The strain of constant playing mixed with the need for side-jobs had put a strain on the band. Right before retiring they put out what they thought would be their final single, "Across the Sea" with America's Got Talent (season 12) finalist Mandy Harvey.

The band got restless in retirement and returned to playing shows and recording the following year. It was in this period that they released "The Great War EP" an EP focused on songs about World War I that was a departure from the usually comic and jovial nature of their music. This was followed by their first interstate tour in 2019, which took them to the famous Molly Malone's pub, the namesake of Flogging Molly.

2020 brought challenges to the band. Shortly after playing with fellow Celtic rockers The Young Dubliners, their St. Patrick's Day plans were put into disarray by the onset of COVID-19. However, the band used the time in lockdown to complete work on their fifth studio album, "Glass to Mouth" which was released in October 2020.

== Discography ==
- Stubbies Assemble - 2011
- Parental Advisory Live - 2012
- Whiskey Business - 2012
- Celtic-American - 2013
- Uisce Beatha: The Water of LIVE - 2015
- Critical Fail - 2015
- Across the Sea (feat. Mandy Harvey) [Single] - 2016
- The Great War [EP] - 2018
- Glass to Mouth - 2020
