= GalaCon =

Annual My Little Pony fan convention

- Official GalaCon banner
- Status: Active
- Genre: My Little Pony fan convention
- Venue: Stuttgart International Youth Hostel (2012); Forum am Schlosspark (2013–2022); Bürgerzentrum Waiblingen (2023–)
- Location: Waiblingen
- Country: Germany
- Inaugurated: July 2012
- Most recent: 5–6 September 2026
- Next event: 4–5 September 2027
- Organizer: Pony Events Federation
- Website: https://galacon.eu/

GalaCon is an annual My Little Pony fan convention held in Waiblingen, Germany organized for the fandom of the animated television series My Little Pony: Friendship Is Magic, whose adult fans are commonly referred to as bronies. The convention is the largest My Little Pony fan convention in Europe and was established in 2012 as the European counterpart to BronyCon.

The next GalaCon is set to take place 4–5 September 2027 at the Bürgerzentrum Waiblingen.

== Overview ==
GalaCon originally began in 2012 in a youth hostel in Bad Cannstatt but moved to the Forum am Schlosspark in Ludwigsburg after experiencing rapid growth in its second year. The convention is organized by the Pony Events Federation and reaches over 1,000 attendees. The centerpiece of GalaCon is the Gala Ball, held on Saturday evening with live music and dancing, along with various activities including artist vendor booths, voice actor panels, and charity auctions for animal welfare organizations organized by the Bronies for Good initiative.

The convention has featured notable guests of honor from the show's production, such as voice actors Ashleigh Ball, Michelle Creber, Tabitha St. Germain, and Kazumi Evans, as well as production staff like director "Big Jim" Miller and composer Daniel Ingram.

GalaCon has occasionally generated complaints from local residents due to late-night gatherings at nearby establishments.

GalaCon was featured in the 2012 documentary film Bronies: The Extremely Unexpected Adult Fans of My Little Pony.

== See also ==
- BronyCAN
- BronyCon
- Czequestria
- Everfree Northwest
- RuBronyCon
- UK PonyCon
- My Little Pony fan convention
