= Pop Culture Classroom =

Defunct American literature non-profit

Pop Culture Classroom was a nonprofit organization based in Denver, Colorado that teaches literacy and the arts through alternative approaches to learn and increase character development. The organization creates educational programs for underserved youth, schools, and communities using comic books, graphic novels, and related media to inspire passion for reading, art, and learning.

== Overview and history ==
Pop Culture Classroom, originally established as Comic Book Classroom in 2010 by Charlie LaGreca, Frank Romero, David Vinson, and Kevin Vinson, is an organization dedicated to enhancing students' learning through the use of comic books. In the same years, the founders launched the Denver Comic Con, later renamed the Denver Pop Culture Con.

The Classroom program debuted the first version of its “Storytelling Through Comics” curriculum to local area schools in the fall of 2011. “Storytelling Through Comics” is a free graphic literature creation program used by schools, teachers, and community organizations. The program currently offers students an educational experience that includes instruction in reading and vocabulary, writing stories, and eventually the creation of the students’ own comics. Completed entries are then published in a class collection.

With the help of hundreds of volunteers and donations, the Classroom launched the Denver Comic Con event on Father's Day weekend, June 15, 2012.

In 2014, the Board of Directors removed both co-founders Charlie LaGreca and Frank Romero, then voted to change the name to Pop Culture Classroom (PCC). The name change reflects the board's broader vision for the organization to go beyond comic books.

In 2019, Pop Culture Classroom launched Reno Pop Culture Con in Reno, Nevada.

In 2020, Denver Pop Culture Con and Reno Pop Culture Con were canceled due to the COVID-19 pandemic.

In March 2021, Fan Expo HQ acquired Denver Pop Culture Con from Pop Culture Classroom. Pop Culture Classroom will remain a part of the event as its featured charity and by providing educational program.

== Need ==
The need for literacy education in Colorado inspired the Classroom program. High percentages of elementary and middle school-aged children in Colorado do not have or cannot afford after-school care. Additionally, several studies show that children who receive arts education often outperform children who do not in most educational areas.

== Curriculum ==
Pop Culture Classroom's “Storytelling Through Comics” curriculum was designed to educate 11 to 14 year-old students (grades 5-8) about literacy and the arts. The common core curriculum enhanced students’ writing and reading abilities and artistic skills through an interactive educational experience focused around comic books and graphic novels. It could be offered as an after-school course, a stand-alone unit, or as a complement to an existing language arts curriculum in a classroom.

The six-week program was broken out into a series of distinct lesson modules:

- The Joy of Reading: Students learn the terms associated with the creation, design, and reading of comics and gain an understanding of the enjoyment and personal fulfillment associated with the medium.
- Visual & Textual Storytelling: Students learn about storytelling arcs and define exposition, event, rising action, crisis, falling action and conclusion. Participants begin drafting their own short comic strip using the storytelling arc as a template.
- Dialogue: Students were introduced to dialogue as a narrative device and begin scripting their stories.
- Analyzing Conflict Resolution through Dialogue and Using an Outline: Students learned how dialogue reveals conflict and resolution in comics and learn the technique of reverse outlining to pace their stories.
- Basic Drawing for Comics: Students learned basic drawing techniques from a guest artist.
- Creating Comics and the “Author's Chair” Celebration: Students finished their comic story using techniques taught in previous modules and celebrate their achievement.

== Programming ==
Programming is conducted by volunteers, many of whom are trained art educators or comic industry professionals. In addition to actively teaching in classrooms and after-school programs, volunteers provide administrative support, curriculum/assessment development, comic and literature reviews, outreach, website development, fundraising, and event planning.

== Influence ==
Since the first Pop Culture Classroom program was conducted at Force Elementary School (Denver Public Schools) in the spring of 2010, Pop Culture Classroom has impacted over 400 students in the Denver metro region. The organization has conducted programs at over a dozen elementary and middle schools in the Denver area as well as community organizations such as the Boys & Girls Club of Metro Denver and the WOW! Children's Museum of Lafayette, Colorado.

== Support ==
Supplementary support for Pop Culture Classroom's educational programming is provided by the Stan Lee Foundation and the national non-for-profit organization Generation Schools. In 2013, actor William Shatner appeared in the Pop Culture Classroom's "Corral" at Denver Comic Con to read Maurice Sendak's children's book Where The Wild Things Are in support of Pop Culture Classroom.
