= BronyCAN =

Discontinued My Little Pony fan convention

- Status: Defunct
- Genre: My Little Pony fan convention
- Venue: Executive Hotel Vancouver Airport
- Location: Richmond, British Columbia
- Country: Canada
- Inaugurated: 24–25 August 2013
- Most recent: 25–27 August 2017
- Attendance: 1,076 in August 2014 (peak)
- Website: https://bronycan.ca/

BronyCAN was an annual My Little Pony fan convention held in Richmond, British Columbia, Canada organized for the fandom of the animated television series My Little Pony: Friendship Is Magic, whose adult fans are commonly referred to as bronies. The convention was the first Canadian convention for bronies and operated from 2013 until its cessation in 2017.

Following BronyCAN's closure, Vanhoover Pony Expo was established in 2019 to "carr[y] forward the legacy of the brony community in Canada."

== Overview ==
BronyCAN was an annual convention primarily dedicated to fans of the animated television show My Little Pony: Friendship is Magic, particularly the adult fans known as bronies. The inaugural convention was held August 24–25, 2013 in Richmond, British Columbia, and attracted 850 attendees. At its peak, the convention attracted 1,076 attendees.

The convention featured various activities, such as "Ponyville Idol" contests, pajama parties, and panels featuring voice actors, writers, and musicians from the show. Additional activities included ice cream socials, nerf wars, and card tournaments featuring the My Little Pony trading card game. According to CBC News, attendees, many dressed in costumes inspired by the series, said that they wished to spread the show's message of "tolerance, inclusion and friendship" to those unfamiliar with the brony phenomenon.

The 2014 edition of BronyCAN had roughly 1,000 registered attendees. The convention took place August 22–24, 2014, and featured guest speakers from DHX Media, the Canadian company that produces Friendship Is Magic. The theme for 2014 was "diversity and inclusiveness of both men and women, and pony fans of all ages." Show songwriter and composer Daniel Ingram was a guest of honor at BronyCAN 2014.

BronyCAN was described as "Canada's sole brony convention" during its operation. However, after reaching its peak attendance, the convention began to experience declining numbers. Former treasurer Trapa Civet noted that by the end of the convention's run, organizers struggled to break even financially. The convention ceased operations in 2017 after its final event, which was held August 25–27; its venue, the Executive Hotel Vancouver Airport, was later used by Vanhoover Pony Expo beginning in 2019.

== See also ==
- BronyCon
- Czequestria
- Everfree Northwest
- GalaCon
- TrotCon
- Vanhoover Pony Expo
- List of My Little Pony fan conventions
