= Paul Morrissey (comics) =

American graphic novel editor and writer

Paul Morrissey is an American graphic novel editor and writer who has edited and developed several comic books, graphic novels, and manga. His career started at Tokyopop, where he oversaw the production of a multitude of manga properties, including Fruits Basket.

At Boom! Studios, Morrissey edited the Harvey Award-winning The Muppet Show Comic Book, along with comic books based on Disney/Pixar films, including The Incredibles, Cars, Monsters, Inc, Finding Nemo, Wall*E and Toy Story.

While at Archaia, Morrissey won an Eisner Award in 2011 for co-editing (with David Petersen) the graphic novel anthology Mouse Guard: Legends of the Guard. In 2012, he edited and contributed a story to Archaia's Harvey Award-nominated Fraggle Rock series.

As a writer, Morrissey has penned comic book stories based on all-ages properties, such as Teen Titans Go! (co-written with Heather Nuhfer), Sesame Street, Fraggle Rock, and Casper's Scare School.
