= BronyCon =

Discontinued annual fan convention

- Official logo
- Status: Inactive
- Genre: My Little Pony fan convention
- Venue: Baltimore Convention Center
- Location: Baltimore, Maryland
- Country: United States
- Inaugurated: June 2011
- Most recent: August 2019
- Attendance: 10,215 in 2019
- Filing status: 501(c)(3) non-profit organization
- Website: https://www.bronycon.org

BronyCon was an annual fan convention held on the East Coast of the United States for fans of My Little Pony: Friendship Is Magic, among them adult and teenage bronies. Eleven events were held, with the final one in August 2019 drawing in 10,215 attendees. Though originally planned to run through 2025, it was announced at the closing ceremonies of the 2018 convention that 2019 would be the final year, tying in with the final season of the show.

BronyCon was previously styled as BroNYCon, as its first three conventions were held in New York City. It dropped the 'NYC' capitalization for its fourth event, which was held in nearby Secaucus, New Jersey. The 2013 event marked the convention's move to Baltimore, Maryland, as well as a shift from twice a year to once a year. A 501(c)(3) non-profit entity, Lunar Solis Corp., was created to operate the convention and manage its charity efforts.

== History ==
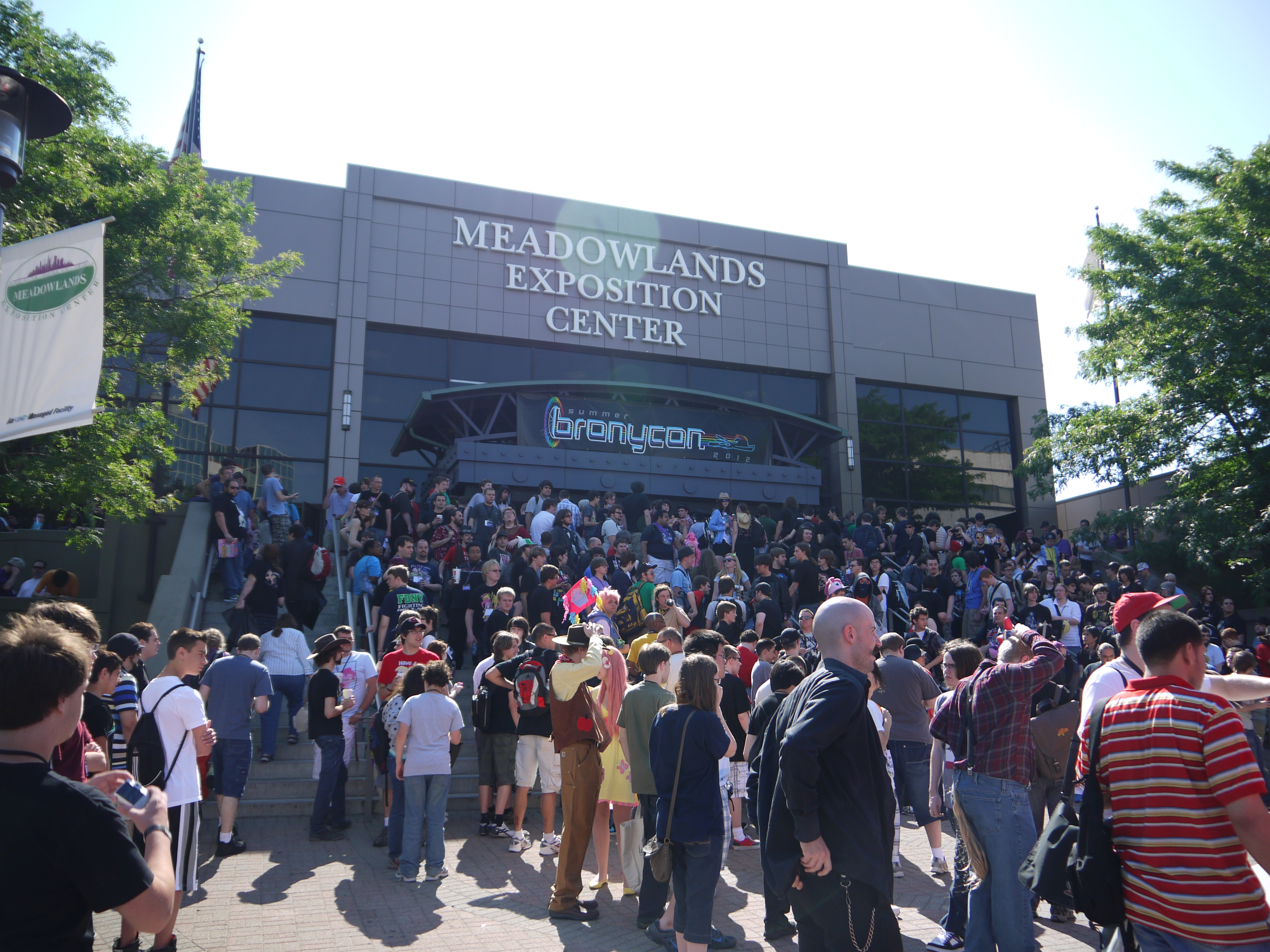
Bronies gathered outside the Meadowlands Exposition Center waiting for the convention to start on June 30, 2012

My Little Pony: Friendship Is Magic first aired on the Hub on October 10, 2010, as part of Hasbro's intent to promote the fledgling network and market its new line of My Little Pony toys. Though a critical success with the target demographic of young girls and their parents, it attracted an unexpected audience of teenage and adult fans, primarily male, originating from 4chan. The fandom adopted the term "brony", a portmanteau of "bro" and "pony", and became a highly participatory culture representing New Sincerity, creating fan art, fan fiction, music, mashup videos, and other media. The show's creators, including executive producers Lauren Faust, Jayson Thiessen, Christophe Toverski, the writers and voice actors, Hasbro and the Hub have sought to embrace the brony community, communicating openly with the community and placing subtle nods to the fandom within the show and licensed property.

One facet of the older fan base was to create local meetups to socialize about the show and other elements. BronyCon grew out of the local meetups in the New York metropolitan area; it was founded in 2011 by fan Jessica Blank ("Purple Tinker"), who viewed the brony movement as a "men's version of feminism". Following the success of an "inaugural NYC brony meet" in Little Italy on May 28, 2011, which was attended by over 30 people, the first BronyCon took place in Midtown Manhattan in June 2011 and drew 100 attendees. The second, held in September 2011, had been able to secure the show's current supervising director Jayson Thiessen as a guest, leading to an increase to 300 people attending the event. The third convention, held in January 2012, included three of the voice actresses from the show, drawing at least 700 attendees and requiring the move to a large meeting center.

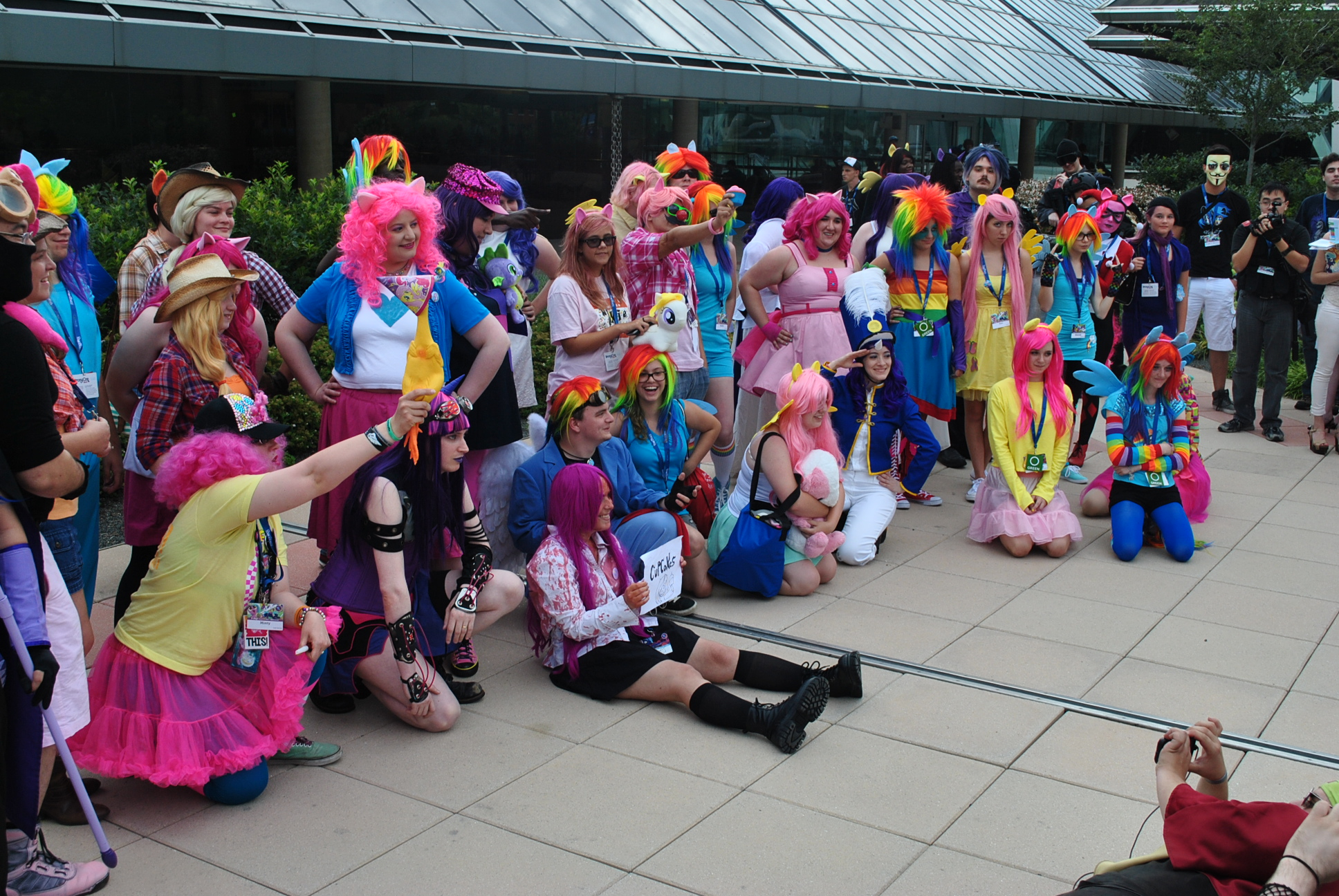
Cosplay photoshoots, such at this one during the 2014 convention, are a common feature of BronyCon

The fourth BronyCon, held on June 30, 2012 and July 1, 2012, had early on been able to arrange for several of the voice actors and show writers to attend. The staff was able to arrange for Faust and actor John de Lancie, who voiced the villain Discord for two episodes, to be guests of honor. Upon announcement of these high-profile guests, interest in the convention sharply increased. The staff moved the location to the Meadowlands Exposition Center in New Jersey and expanded the event over two days, allowing the convention to hold more than 4,000 attendees, while live-streaming panels to an estimated 3,500 additional viewers.

Andrew Benage, BronyCon's media liaison, estimated that BronyCon's 2013 event would attract between 6,000 and 8,000 attendees, including a larger proportion of international fans. On November 10, 2012, it was announced on the BronyCon Facebook page that the BronyCon 2013 event would be held at the Baltimore Convention Center and the Hilton Baltimore Hotel in Baltimore, Maryland on August 2, 2013 to August 4, 2013. The 2013 event drew 8,407 attendees and hosted panels of voice actors and writers from the show as well as the creators of the My Little Pony comic series.

The sixth BronyCon convention ran from August 1–3, 2014 in Baltimore, and drew more than 9,600 attendees. The seventh 2015 BronyCon convention ran at the Baltimore Convention Center from August 7–9, 2015 and drew 10,011 attendees, an increase from 2014. Visit Baltimore, the city's tourism board, estimates that BronyCon brings in $5.5 million in revenue to local businesses.

The eighth BronyCon convention ran from July 8–10, 2016 in Baltimore and drew 7,609 attendees, a decrease of roughly 24% from the previous year. This decline was expected by BronyCon staff and was attributed to taking place in July, rather than the traditional August. However, despite the assurance that moving back to August would "fix" the drop in attendance, the ninth BronyCon took place on August 11–13, 2017, and continued the decline, hosting 6,319 attendees, a further 17% drop from the previous year; the event still brought an estimated US$3.5 million in revenue to the city, according to Visit Baltimore. The tenth and penultimate BronyCon convention ran from July 27–29, 2018 in Baltimore dropped attendance further, reaching only 5,465 attendees and was a decrease of roughly 14% compared to the previous year.

Despite announcing via Twitter in October 2014 that BronyCon had dates set through 2025, the 2018 convention ended with the announcement that 2019's show would be the final BronyCon. BronyCon chair, Sheva Goldberg, cited "fading" enthusiasm and a desire to "leave everyone remembering what BronyCon is at its best" as the primary reasons to end the convention. To celebrate the final event, the convention was extended to a fourth day, running from August 1–4, 2019 and was able to secure numerous guests including Faust and the original My Little Pony brand creator Bonnie Zacherle. Though the staff had only expected to get about seven to eight thousand attendees with the expanded schedule, the final BronyCon event in 2019 ultimately drew 10,215 attendees, the highest attendance in its history and an increase of roughly 87% to the previous year. Due to limited convention space, the 2019 BronyCon had an admissions limit of 11,000.

=== Future after BronyCon ===
Friendship Is Magic broadcast its final season in 2019. In light of this, the organizers of BronyCon decided to make 2019 the final meeting of that convention. The series ended on October 12, 2019.

== Format ==
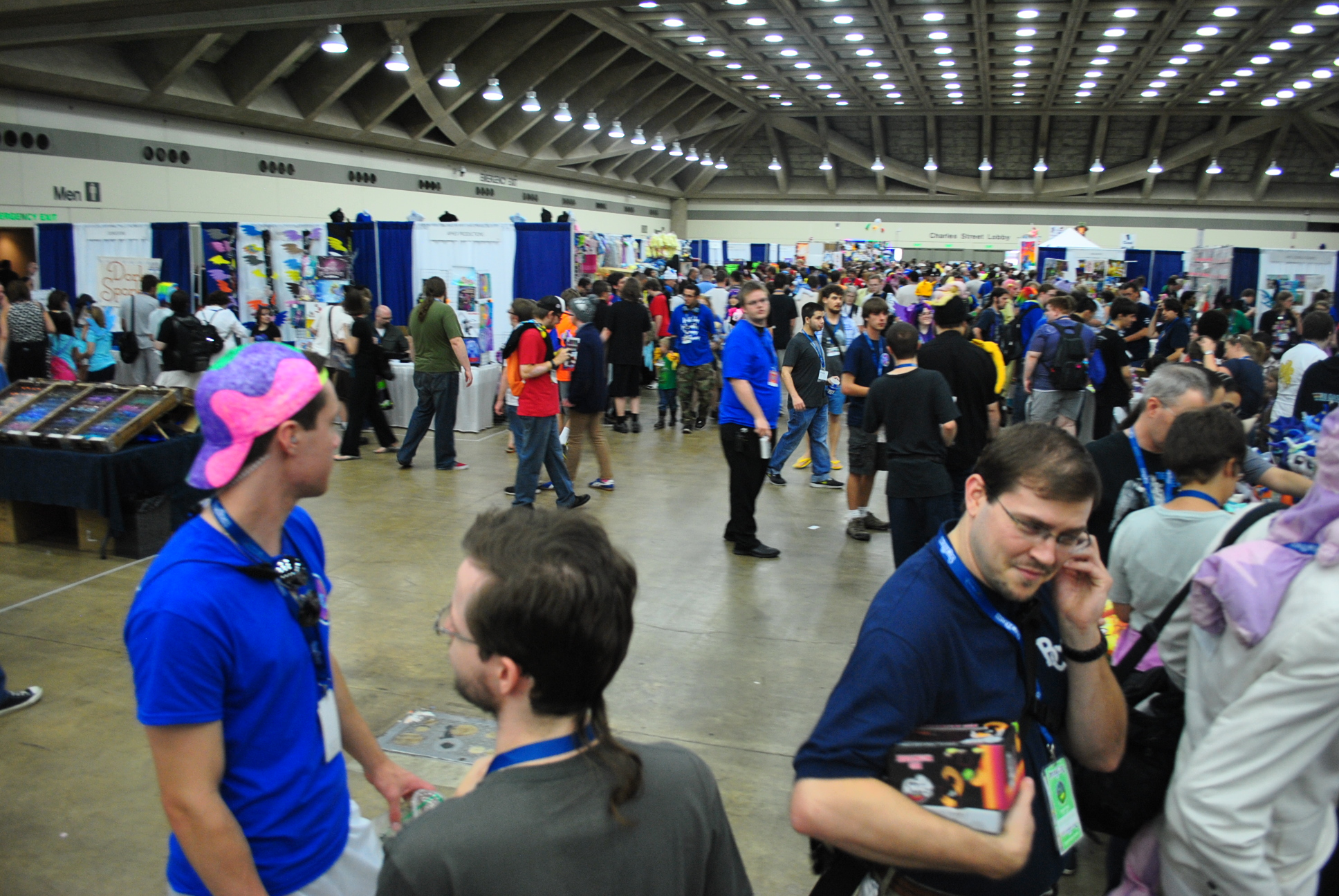
The vendor hall at the 2014 BronyCon Convention, with more than 200 freelance vendors selling handcrafted My Little Pony: Friendship Is Magic artwork

Since moving from the smaller venues, BronyCon typically offered upwards of one hundred panels and activities for attendees; many panels were dedicated to the convention's guests of honor but included panels and presentations from members of the fanbase on art, music, writing, video productions, and other community aspects. The convention also provided a number of activity rooms, such as for art, video games, cosplay, and with the introduction of the official Enterplay collectible card game based on the show, rooms for card game tournaments. The convention included a musical concert over one or two nights called "Bronypalooza", featuring fan musicians performing for the attendees, at times joined by some of the guests of honor. The convention attracted a large number of freelance vendors (over 200 at the 2014 convention, for example), selling handmade art, along with selected retail vendors with licensed My Little Pony merchandise.

The convention was designed to be family-friendly, and upwards of 10% of its attendees were children under 14 who also enjoy the show. While the brony fandom tends to consist of mostly male fans (85% based on a 2013 unofficial survey), BronyCon also attracted a larger percentage of female fans; 34% of the attendees for the 2014 BronyCon were female.

== Location and dates ==
Dates	Location	Attendees	Notable guests (in order of announcement)
June 25, 2011	NYC Seminar and Conference Center, Midtown Manhattan	100	Cabal, founder of RainbowDash.net
September 24, 2011	Chinatown, Manhattan	300	Shaun "Sethisto" Scotellaro, Jayson Thiessen
January 7, 2012	Hotel Pennsylvania, New York City	650	Ashleigh Ball, Andrea Libman, Nicole Oliver, Daniel Ingram, My Little Pony: Fighting Is Magic development team, Alex S., Shaun "Sethisto" Scotellaro, fan artists John Joseco, Pixelkitties, and Egophiliac
June 30, 2012 – July 1, 2012	Meadowlands Exposition Center, Secaucus, New Jersey	4,000	Lauren Faust, John de Lancie, Tara Strong, Peter New, Nicole Oliver, Andrea Libman, Meghan McCarthy, Cathy Weseluck, Lee Tockar, Amy Keating Rogers
August 2–4, 2013	Baltimore Convention Center and Hilton Baltimore Hotel, Baltimore, Maryland	8,407	Andy Price, Katie Cook, Heather Breckel, Nicole Oliver, Lee Tockar, Cathy Weseluck, Michelle Creber, Madeleine Peters, Amy Keating Rogers, M.A. Larson, Brenda Crichlow, G.M. Berrow
August 1–3, 2014	Baltimore Convention Center, Baltimore, Maryland	9,607	Daniel Ingram, Kazumi Evans, Tabitha St. Germain, Andrea Libman, Heather Breckel, Tony Fleecs, Katie Cook, Andy Price, Terry Klassen, Rebecca Shoichet, Sabrina "Sibsy" Alberghetti, Josh Haber, Claire Corlett, Ian James Corlett, Peter New, G.M. Berrow, "Big" Jim Miller, Brent Hodge
August 7–9, 2015	Baltimore Convention Center, Baltimore, Maryland	10,011	Tony Fleecs, Nicole Oliver, Agnes Garbowska, Andrea Libman, Heather Nuhfer, Kazumi Evans, Amy Keating Rogers, Michael Dobson, G.M. Berrow, Charlotte Fullerton, Andy Price, M.A. Larson, John de Lancie, Kelly Sheridan, Cathy Weseluck
July 8–10, 2016	Baltimore Convention Center and Hilton Baltimore Hotel, Baltimore, Maryland	7,609	Tony Fleecs, Michelle Creber, Gabriel Brown, Andrea Libman, Sara Richard, G.M. Berrow, Tara Strong, Andy Price, Tabitha St. Germain, Ingrid Nilson, M.A. Larson, Ashleigh Ball, Dave Polsky, Jeremy Whitley, Chiara Zanni, Jenn Blake
August 11–13, 2017	Baltimore Convention Center and Hilton Baltimore Hotel, Baltimore, Maryland	6,319	Michelle Creber, Daniel Ingram, Claire Corlett, Gabriel Brown, Madeleine Peters, Brynna Drummond, Cathy Weseluck, Ian James Corlett, Brian Drummond, Kyle Rideout, Vincent Tong, Kelly Sheridan, Blair Peters, Tony Fleecs, Andy Price
July 27–29, 2018	Baltimore Convention Center and Hilton Baltimore Hotel, Baltimore, Maryland	5,465	Jay Fosgitt, Tony Fleecs, Sara Richard, Tabitha St. Germain, Michelle Creber, Gabriel Brown, Nick Confalone, Peter New, Ingrid Nilson, Amy Keating Rogers, M.A. Larson, Lena Hall, Bill Newton, community guests
August 1–4, 2019	Baltimore Convention Center and Hilton Baltimore Hotel, Baltimore, Maryland	10,215	Andrea Libman, Britt McKillip, Jayson Thiessen, Nicole Oliver, Cathy Weseluck, Tony Fleecs, Andy Price, Sara Richard, Michelle Creber, Gabriel Brown, Rebecca Shoichet, Lauren Faust, M.A. Larson, Bonnie Zacherle, community guests

== Documentaries ==
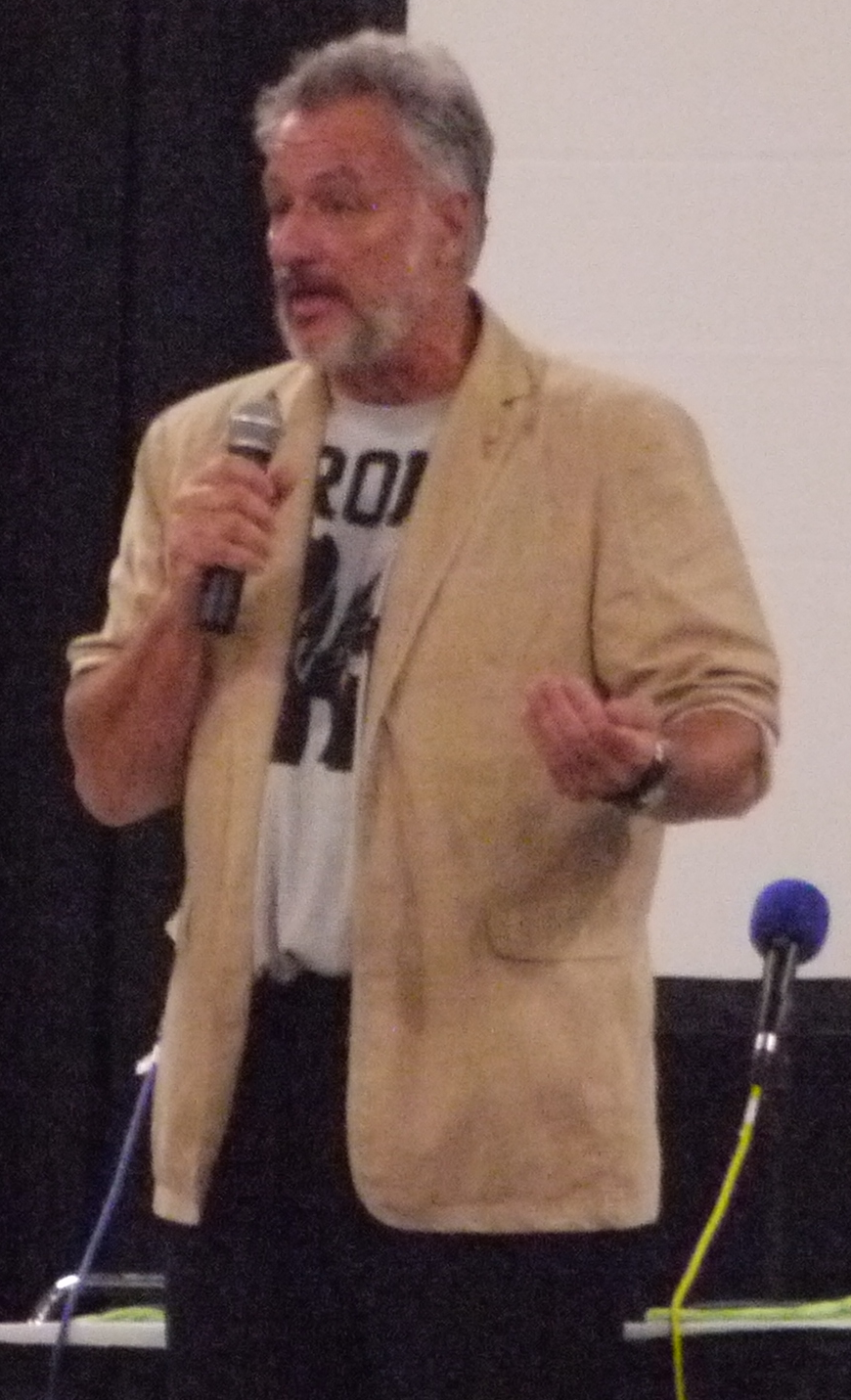
John de Lancie, wearing a "Brony" shirt, addresses the attendees of the 2012 Summer BronyCon

BronyCon attracted the attention of filmmakers as to document the brony phenomenon. One such documentary is Bronies: The Extremely Unexpected Adult Fans of My Little Pony. Prior to the 4th BronyCon, documentary filmmaker Michael Brockhoff started a Kickstarter-funded project to create a documentary about the brony culture to be filmed at the convention, tentatively titled BronyCon: The Documentary. He was joined by actor John de Lancie, who voiced the character of Discord from the first two episodes "The Return of Harmony" from the second season; Faust had envisioned Discord based on de Lancie's earlier role as Q from Star Trek. De Lancie had not initially considered the role to be significant, but after airing of the episode, discovered himself to be awash in enthusiastic fans of the show praising his performance. Since then, he had become fascinated by the brony culture, comparing it to the growth of fans from the original Star Trek series, and signed on to be an executive producer for this documentary.

Brockhoff initially sought for $60,000 to create the documentary but this was quickly met. Brockhoff adjusted the goal part way through, looking to secure $200,000, which would allow him to film at the homes of fans of the show and elsewhere outside of the convention, and to bring aboard both Faust and Strong as co-executive producers along with de Lancie. This goal was also met well before the end of the pledge period, and so an additional target of $280,000 was set to allow the filmmakers to get additional coverage on two European conventions (GalaCon in Germany and B.U.C.K. in the United Kingdom) and perform more remote coverage of specific aspects of the brony culture. The funding drive ended with more than $340,000 in pledges, making it the second-largest film-based project to be funded on Kickstarter.

Brockhoff and his team have announced plans to rerelease the documentary with additional content after its release to Kickstarter backers in a film package, Bronies, that will be available for the public through retail and digital storefronts as well as for showings at film festivals, to be completed by 2013. After an initial showing at Equestria LA in Los Angeles in early November 2012, the producers opted to change the title of the film to Bronies: The Extremely Unexpected Adult Fans of My Little Pony, reflecting the larger scope of the project.

A separate documentary film, A Brony Tale, is a Canadian-American production directed by Brent Hodge. After collaborating with her band Hey Ocean at CBC Radio 3, Hodge met Vancouver voice actress Ashleigh Ball. When Ashleigh told Brent about e-mails she was getting from fans that called themselves "bronies", Hodge immediately began production. The film focuses on the brony phenomenon as well as follows the experience of Ashleigh Ball, one of the show's voice actresses, as she receives an invitation to the January 2012 BronyCon and decides to attend. The film premiered at the 2014 Tribeca Film Festival where it received critical acclaim and received a theatrical release on July 8, 2014. The film received critical acclaim, holding an 89% rating on Rotten Tomatoes and is currently available through digital downloads, DVD and on Blu-ray.

"No crowdfunding. Self-funded through Hodgee Films. It started out as just a fun project I wanted to do and really snowballed and turned into something. I'm good friends with the main subject Ashleigh Ball, so filming didn't have to be such an ordeal. We would just hang out and create stuff. I couldn't wait for any funding or even the time to fill out the forms for grant applications. I didn't want anyone else to have a say with the planning of this one. I knew I just needed to film it," said Hodge in an interview with IndieWire.

The 2014 BronyCon was featured on a Season 4 episode of AMC's Comic Book Men.

The 2015 BronyCon is featured on the WWE Network on the "WWE Culture Shock" series hosted by Corey Graves, former NXT Tag Team Champion (with Adrian Neville) and #1 Contender for the NXT Championship. The 2015 BronyCon was also featured on the Channel 4 programme World of Weird broadcast on 23 September 2015.

== See also ==
- My Little Pony fan convention
- Everfree Northwest
- BronyCAN
- Czequestria
- GalaCon
- Ponyville Ciderfest
- RuBronyCon
- UK PonyCon
