= Heather Nuhfer =

American comic book writer (born 1982)

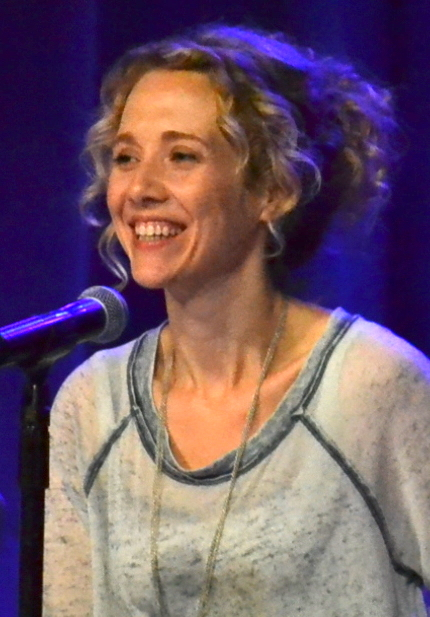
- Nuhfer at BronyCon in 2015
- Born: 1982 (age 43–44)
- Area: Writer
- Pseudonym: Heather White
- Notable works: My So-Called Superpowers My Little Pony: Friendship Is Magic

Heather Nuhfer (born 1982) is an American comic book writer who frequently specializes in all-ages material.

== Career ==
Heather Nuhfer has written several all-ages comic books, including the lead story in Archaia's Harvey-Award nominated Fraggle Rock series. Using the pen name of Heather White, Nuhfer's Fraggle Rock tale presented Jim Henson's characters in an all-new story for the first time in over 20 years.

Nuhfer scripted a 4-issue arc of My Little Pony: Friendship is Magic, IDW's best-selling comic book series based on Hasbro's hit animated series, which debuted on The Hub in 2010. The arc features art by Amy Mebberson. Nuhfer has also written two 2-issue arcs for the main title and one issue of the Fiendship Is Magic side series.

She has co-written several Teen Titans GO! comic books for DC Comics with writer/editor Paul Morrissey, based on the animated TV series. Nuhfer has penned stories for Wonder Woman, The Simpsons, Scooby Doo, Sesame Street, The Vampire Diaries.

Nuhfer has written two Monster High graphic novels for Little, Brown and Company.

Her trilogy of prose novels for children currently includes My So-Called Superpowers (2018), Mixed Emotions (2019), and All the Feels (2020), all published by Macmillan Publishers.

Nuhfer made her TV writing debut on the 2018 reboot of Littlest Pet Shop, Littlest Pet Shop: A World of Our Own.
