= My Little Pony Collectible Card Game =

Collectible card game

- Card back for My Little Pony Collectible Card Game
- Manufacturers: Enterplay LLC
- Publication: December 13, 2013
- Genres: Collectible card game
- Languages: English
- Players: 2
- Age range: 10+

The My Little Pony Collectible Card Game (abbreviated as MLPCCG) is a two-player collectible card game based on the animated television series My Little Pony: Friendship Is Magic. It is produced by Enterplay LLC under license from Hasbro, and follows from Enterplay's previous work to produce a trading card series based on the same show.

The game requires each player to form a deck with one "Mane" character, 10 Problem cards that earn the players points when solved, and many other cards representing Friends, Resources, and other concepts; these cards are based on characters and other elements from the series. The goal is to play cards from one's hand to face off against any Problems put forth by either player, scoring points for doing so. The player to score a set number of points first is declared the winner. The game is distributed in pre-made one- or two-deck starter packs, and booster packs to expand a player's library. Since its release, the game has received seven major expansions and several themed decks.

The game has generally been well-received, providing an easy-to-learn experience for both the younger demographic of the show as well as the older players including the adult and male fans of the series. Enterplay has stated the game has sold well in the hobby store market and have arranged for various tournaments in such stores and fan conventions.

== Gameplay ==
MLPCCG is a two-player game, with each player using a set of cards. One card is a Mane character printed on both sides, exactly 10 cards are Problem cards which are kept in a separate draw pile, and the remaining are various Friends, Resources, Events, and Troublemakers; there must be a minimum of 45 of these cards for a legal deck. Each Mane and Friend card are associated with one of six colors, representing the show's six main characters–Twilight Sparkle, Rainbow Dash, Pinkie Pie, Rarity, Applejack, and Fluttershy–and their respective Elements of Harmony, and a numerical power value. Friends, Resources, Events, and Troublemakers have various power costs associated to play or face those cards, a combination of action tokens (earned during play) and colored power required (based on what cards the player has in play already). Problems have two sets of values, one based on colored power requirements representing what the owner needs to face the Problems, and general power that their opponent needs to face the Problem. Both Problems and Troublemakers include point values representing scoring elements for the game.

Players set up the game by placing their Mane character in their Start state, drawing and placing a Problem card from that pile, and dealing themselves their hand from the remaining deck. On each turn, players earn a number of action tokens (at least 2) based on their current score. They can then play cards from their hand to their "home" space (not challenging any Problem) with what action tokens they have, and then move any of their Mane or Friends to one of the Problem cards, as long as they have met the specific requirements. As long as a player has faced a problem unopposed, they earn a point towards their score, as well as bonus points if they are first at a problem. If a player moves their Mane or Friends to a Problem that is already challenged, a face off occurs between the two sides, the winner determined by the combined value of the cards on both sides. The winner earns additional points, and the Problem is then subsequently removed and replaced by the owner with a new Problem. The first player to earn 15 points is the winner.

Additional cards and abilities can be used to influence the results of facing against Problems. The Mane character has a specific condition that allows the player to flip the card to its Boosted side that provides improved abilities and bonuses for that player. Resources can modify the power and abilities of a given Friend card. Events can be used to perform one-time actions that can include playing additional cards, gaining action tokens, or "exhausting" an opponent's Friend to remove that card from a Problem. Troublemakers are played onto Problems that prevent the opponent from facing the Problem until they win a faceoff against the Troublemaker card.

As a collectible card game, MLPCCG is shipped as a number of pre-made decks with 59 cards, each focused around one of the main characters, and 12-card booster packs. Cards have various rarities, included limited foil editions of some cards. Players can construct their deck from all available cards with some restrictions on including duplicate cards.

== Development and release ==
Prior to developing the game, Enterplay was licensed by Hasbro to print a series of standard trading cards based on the Friendship Is Magic property. The trading cards were popular particularly with the older brony fandom creating high aftermarket value, leading to the development of a second and third series of the cards.

Enterplay announced the CCG in August 2013, with the first premiere sets and boosters shipping on December 13, 2013. Enterplay also published additional material for the card game, such as binders and playmats. Since its release, Enterplay has released nine major expansions, several themed packs, and promotional cards available through conventions and tourneys.

Name	Release date	Number of Unique Cards	Notes
Premiere	December 13, 2013	216	Includes Twilight Sparkle, Applejack, Rarity, Rainbow Dash, Pinkie Pie, and Fluttershy Manes.
Canterlot Nights	May 16, 2014	210	The cards of Princess Celestia and Princess Luna each have two different versions with alternate artwork, but are otherwise the same.
Rock 'N Rave	August 2014	14	Featuring manes Maud Pie and DJ Pon-3.
Celestial Solstice	August 2014	10	Includes six previously published decks, and oversized Twilight Sparkle and Princess Celestia Mane cards.
The Crystal Games	October-November, 2014	212	Includes Spike, Princess Cadance, Cutie Mark Crusaders, and Derpy Hooves Mane cards.
Absolute Discord	May 8, 2015	216	The card of Discord is a foiled fixed card released as a teaser in the Discord Collector's Tin product.
Equestrian Odysseys	August 28, 2015	218	The promo set of 12 cards cannot be found in booster packs.
High Magic	November 20, 2015	152	Each theme deck contains two double-sided Token cards that can be put into play via card abilities.
Marks in Time	June 10, 2016	145	Instead of theme decks, three Draft packs were released with this set
Defenders of Equestria	June 16, 2017	142	
Seaquestria and Beyond	November 24, 2017	142	
Friends Forever	December 14, 2018	141	
Leaders and Legends	November 3, 2019		

Enterplay has collaborated with various hobby and game stores and conventions such as GenCon and BronyCon to host MLPCCG tournaments, with special cards and prizes for the winners.

== Reception ==
U.S. Gamer rated the game four out of five stars, calling the game an "enjoyable and solid two-player game" with good flexibility and accessible for players of all ages, with their primary criticism about the poor instruction booklet included with the game. Kotaku editor Mike Fahey stated that the game is "not Hearthstone, but it's pretty damn entertaining once you know what's going on".

Enterplay's President Dean Irwin stated that the sales of the premiere releases were very positive, selling well within the hobby game market, in contrast to the trading cards which did well in the mass retail store market. The popularity of the premiere release forced Enterplay to reprint the set by mid-February 2014.
