= Krakov =

- Municipality
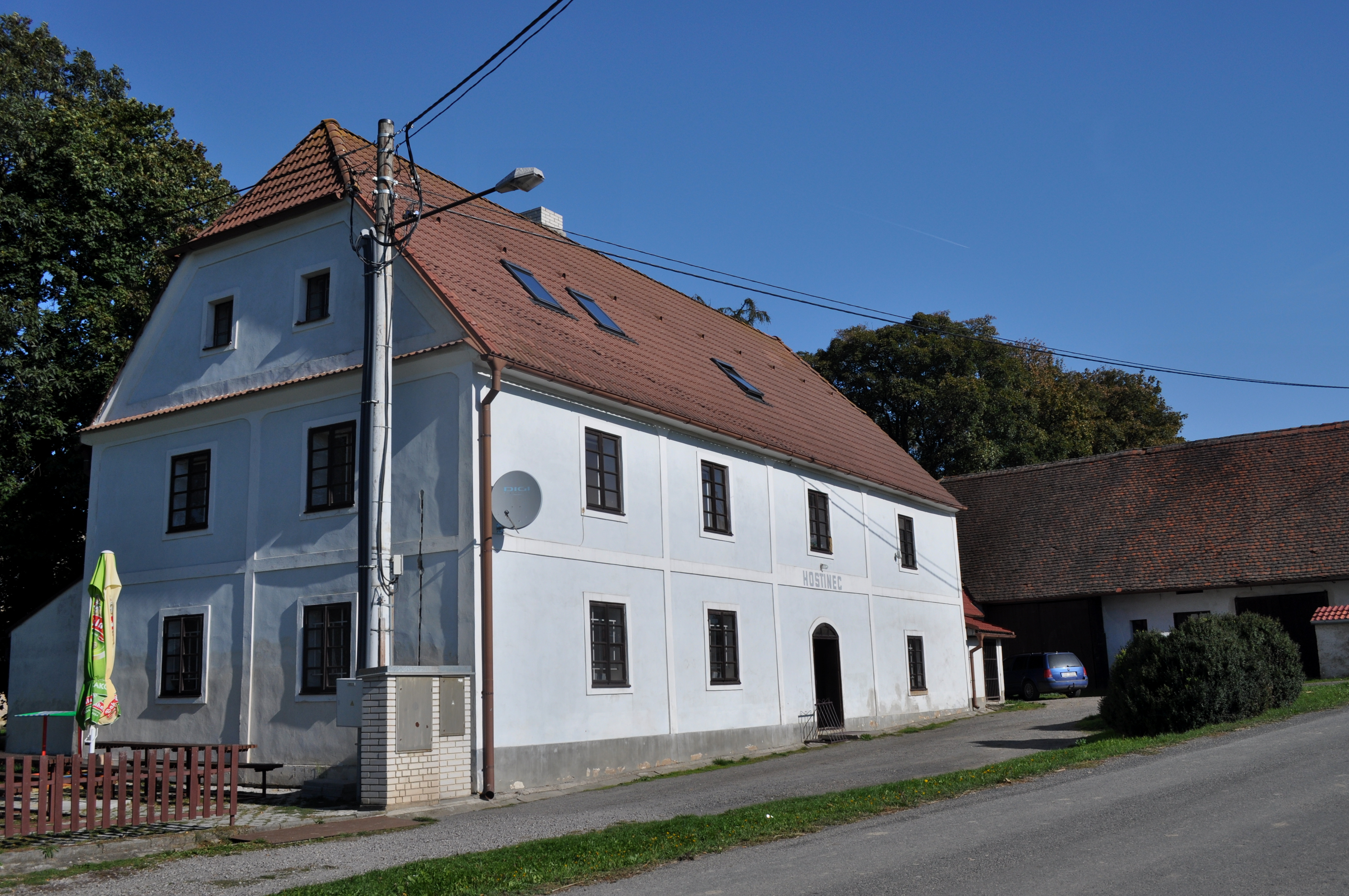
- Pub in Krakov

- Flag Coat of arms

- Location in the Czech Republic
- Coordinates: 50°2′15″N 13°38′51″E
- Country: Czech Republic
- Region: Central Bohemian
- District: Rakovník
- First mentioned: 1358

Area
  - Total: 4.46 km^{2} (1.72 sq mi)
- Elevation: 445 m (1,460 ft)

Population (2026-01-01)
  - Total: 140
  - Density: 31/km^{2} (81/sq mi)
- Time zone: UTC+1 (CET)
  - Summer (DST): UTC+2 (CEST)
- Postal code: 270 35
- Website: www.obec-krakov.cz

Krakov is a municipality and village in Rakovník District in the Central Bohemian Region of the Czech Republic. It has about 100 inhabitants.

== Demographics ==
Historical population
Year	Pop.	±%
1869	306	—
1880	294	−3.9%
1890	293	−0.3%
1900	249	−15.0%
1910	248	−0.4%
1921	277	+11.7%
1930	266	−4.0%
1950	168	−36.8%
1961	162	−3.6%
1970	139	−14.2%
1980	132	−5.0%
1991	118	−10.6%
2001	100	−15.3%
2011	123	+23.0%
2021	136	+10.6%
Source: Censuses
