= Andy Price (artist) =

American comic artist

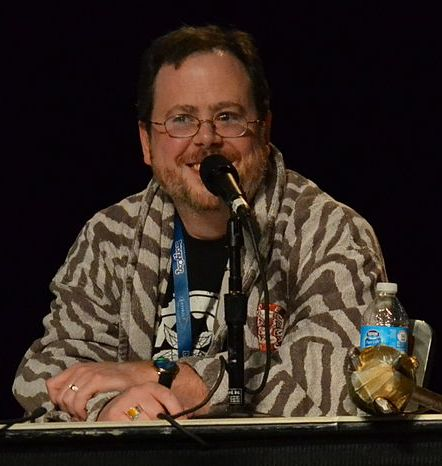
- Price at the 2014 BronyCon convention
- Area: Artist
- Notable works: My Little Pony: Friendship is Magic
- Spouse: Alice

Andy Price is an American comic artist, currently employed by IDW Publishing. He is best known for illustrating the My Little Pony: Friendship is Magic comics.

== Career ==
Price's first published work was for the Quantum Leap comic book series in 1992, acting as both inker and artist. He had very few published works until working on Disney's Haunted Mansion (comics) final issue in 2005.

Price acted as the artist (along with writer Katie Cook) behind issues #1-4 of My Little Pony: Friendship is Magic, a comic based on the popular children's TV show of the same name. Price and Cook also created the one-shot My Little Pony: Micro Series issue centered on Rarity, the unicorn, and Price wrote and drew the final installment of the My Little Pony: Friends Forever series.

Price has done illustration work for DC Comics, Marvel Comics, Innovation Comics, and the Rittenhouse Archives. His other comics work includes licensed titles based on the television series WordGirl.

Price is a graduate of Austin High School in Decatur, Alabama, and the Joe Kubert School of Cartoon and Graphic Art. As of 2012 he resides in Madison, Alabama, with his wife, Alice.
