= Vanhoover Pony Expo =

Annual My Little Pony fan convention

- Status: Active
- Genre: My Little Pony fan convention
- Frequency: Annually
- Venue: Executive Hotel Vancouver Airport
- Location: Richmond, British Columbia
- Country: Canada
- Inaugurated: 11–13 January 2019
- Most recent: 9–11 January 2026
- Next event: 8–10 January 2027
- Chair: Rob "Aphinity" Harrison
- Organizer: BC Anthropomorphic Events Association
- Website: https://vanhoover.ca/

Vanhoover Pony Expo is an annual My Little Pony fan convention held in Richmond, British Columbia, Canada organized for the fandom of the animated television series My Little Pony: Friendship Is Magic, whose adult fans are commonly referred to as bronies. The convention is the largest My Little Pony fan convention in Canada and was established in 2019 following the cessation of BronyCAN in 2017.

The next Vanhoover will take place on 8–10 January 2027 at the Executive Hotel Vancouver Airport.

== Overview ==
Vanhoover Pony Expo is an annual fan convention primarily dedicated to fans of the animated television show My Little Pony: Friendship is Magic, particularly the adult fans known as bronies. The event is described as a "family-friendly" convention that "carries forward the legacy of the brony community in Canada."

The inaugural Vanhoover Pony Expo was held January 11–13, 2019 at the Executive Hotel Vancouver Airport in Richmond, the same venue that previously hosted BronyCAN until its cessation in 2017. The convention is organized with support from the BC Anthropomorphic Events Association (BCAEA), which is also the parent organization of VancouFur, a local furry convention. The convention features two pony mascots named Trail Blazer and Sunny Showers.

Vanhoover features various activities, such as panels, a charity auction, an ice cream social, and video game and tabletop gaming rooms with tournaments for both pony and non-pony related games, as well as concerts featuring musicians from the My Little Pony fandom. Children 12 and under attend for free with registration and an accompanying guardian.

The 2020 edition of Vanhoover was themed "Tropical Canada," and invited attendees "on a tropical January getaway right in the heart of Richmond." Vanhoover 2020 featured various voice actors from Friendship is Magic and Equestria Girls, such as Kelly Sheridan (the voice actor of Starlight Glimmer), Chiara Zanni (Daring Do), Ian Hanlin (Sunburst), and Brian Doe (Timber Spruce), as well as storyboard artist Tori Grant; it also featured Pixelkitties, an artist known for creating official My Little Pony merchandise and autograph images for the cast and crew.

During the COVID-19 pandemic, the convention moved to an online format. The 2022 event, held on January 7–9, was conducted virtually using a Pony Town server that featured digitally recreated Vancouver landmarks.

== See also ==
- BronyCAN
- List of My Little Pony fan conventions
