= Katie Cook (writer) =

American comic artist and writer

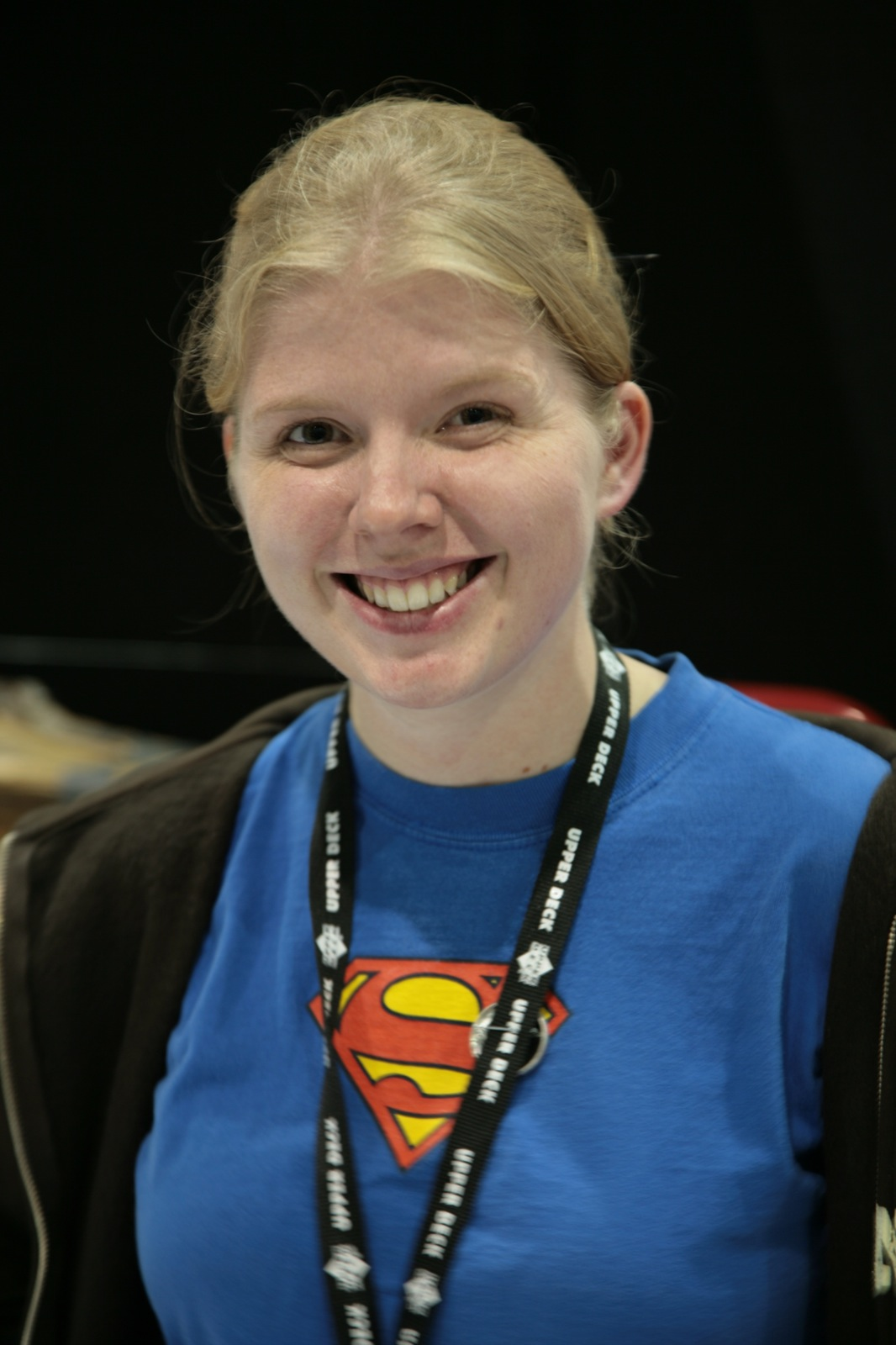
- Katie Cook at Comic-Con 2007
- Born: December 9, 1981 (age 44) Saline, Michigan, U.S.
- Notable works: Gronk: A Monster's Story; My Little Pony: Friendship is Magic; Nothing Special; Various projects for Marvel

Katie Cook is an American comic artist and writer, currently employed by IDW Publishing. She writes the My Little Pony: Friendship is Magic comic and is also known for her webcomics, Gronk and Nothing Special.

== Early life ==
Katie Cook was born in Saline, Michigan on December 9, 1981. Cook grew up in Saline, Michigan and graduated from Saline High School in 2000. She graduated from the College for Creative Studies in Detroit, Michigan, with BFA in Illustration in 2004. Cook created her title character of Gronk: A Monster’s Story during her time in college.

== Career ==
She has worked on licensed properties for Marvel Comics on a variety of projects. She also worked with the Jim Henson Company, working on the comics of Fraggle Rock and working as an illustrator and writer on Jim Henson's The Storyteller. She is well known for her Star Wars artwork and contributes to the official starwars.com blog. More recently though, she acted as the writer (along with artist Andy Price) behind many of the bestselling My Little Pony: Friendship is Magic, a comic based on the popular children's TV show of the same name. The comic has been considered highly successful as the best selling IDW comic and has been cited as helping to boost the area of comics aimed for children; Cook's contributions placed her on Bleeding Cool's Top 100 Power List of people in the comic book industry for 2013. Cook has also worked with DC.

At comics conventions, Cook is known for selling 3"x4" ink and water color mini-paintings for $10. She brings many of these small paintings with her, but also takes custom requests which she creates in minutes.

=== My Little Pony: Friendship is Magic ===
Cook received an offer from IDW to write for the My Little Pony: Friendship is Magic graphic novel series after tweeting to her followers about the television show of the same name. Together with Andy Price, Cook worked as the author for the main series as well as parts of the micro-series of the My Little Pony comics. In the main series, she has contributed to various issues starting with Issues 1 through 4, Issues 9 through 12, and Issues 11 through 12, Issues 17 through 20, Issues 25 through 28, Issues 34 through 37, and Issue 41 to 42. For the micro-series, Cook has written for Issue 3 and Issue 10. Cook's contributions to the My Little Pony comic book series have received mostly positive reviews. In addition to creating storylines for the comic books, Cook has provided various cover art and inset art for the comic books.

=== Marvel comics ===
Cook has contributed multiple stories to the Marvel franchise. One of the books she contributed to is graphic novel Secret Wars: Secret Love, which focuses around Avengers characters all in bug-form. The final story within the graphic novel, called “Happy Ant-iversary”, is written and illustrated by Cook. The story follows the character Wasp, in the form of an actual wasp, as she flies around Central Park. Cook has also contributed to Volume 1 of Spider-Verse. Cook wrote, penciled, and inked the fourth story in the novel, “Penelope Parker”, which introduces schoolgirl Penelope Parker, who is bitten by a spider in a tale similar to Spider-Man’s origins. Cook wrote the final story, “The Smashy Adventures of the Hulk”, which appears as a separate story from the main story of I Am An Avenger #3. In the one-page comic, the Hulk endures grief after receiving a “notice of termination” in regards to his membership on The Avengers. Cook was the illustrator for short story “How We Roll” part of graphic novel Avengers Vs X-Men Volume 1. In addition, Cook has designed covers for Marvel.

=== Gronk: A Monster’s Story ===
Cook wrote a webcomic entitled Gronk: A Monster’s Story and published comics to the comic's website from April 30, 2010, to April 2, 2015. Gronk: A Monster’s Story was transferred to a paperback comic book which contains comics originally seen on the website. On the backend of the book, Cook wrote of Gronk: A Monster’s Story, “An all-ages weekly comic that follows Gronk. A little green monster that has shunned master life. She finds a home with Dale. A young nerd-lady who teaches gronk the ways of her world.”

=== Nothing Special ===
Cook is currently producing Nothing Special as an ongoing weekly webcomic on Webtoon. The webcomic is set in a fantastical land and follows teenagers Callie and Declan, who begin a friendship after they discover that they both share visions of spirits. Callie and Declan start their adventure when Callie's father goes missing and they enter a portal to a different and strange world to find him. The Nothing Special webtoon has been on indefinite hiatus since July 2025 and there is no word on when Cook will return to it.

=== Other works ===
Cook has written two children's books which help children learn the ABCs and learn how to count. The former is called ABC-3PO and the latter OBI-123. Cook wrote the short story “Time Flew” within the first issue of Fraggle Rock, a comic based on a television show of the same name, part of the Muppets franchise. Cook returned to the series for the third issue, writing the short story “My Gift is My Song”. Cook provided illustrations for the first and third issue and provided cover art for the second issue of Fraggle Rock. Cook has worked with DC Comics and Cook provided artwork for Jim Henson’s The Storyteller. Cook also makes artwork for the WonderGround Gallery in Disneyland, part of Downtown Disney. In 2018, Cook published her tutorial book entitled Drawing Cute with Katie Cook.

== Personal life ==
Cook currently lives in the Ann Arbor, Michigan area with her husband, Ryan, and their daughters. Cook attends Comic Cons and often teaches "how to draw" workshops or discusses her career in comics while there.
