= Charity of the My Little Pony: Friendship Is Magic fandom =

Charity of fans of My Little Pony

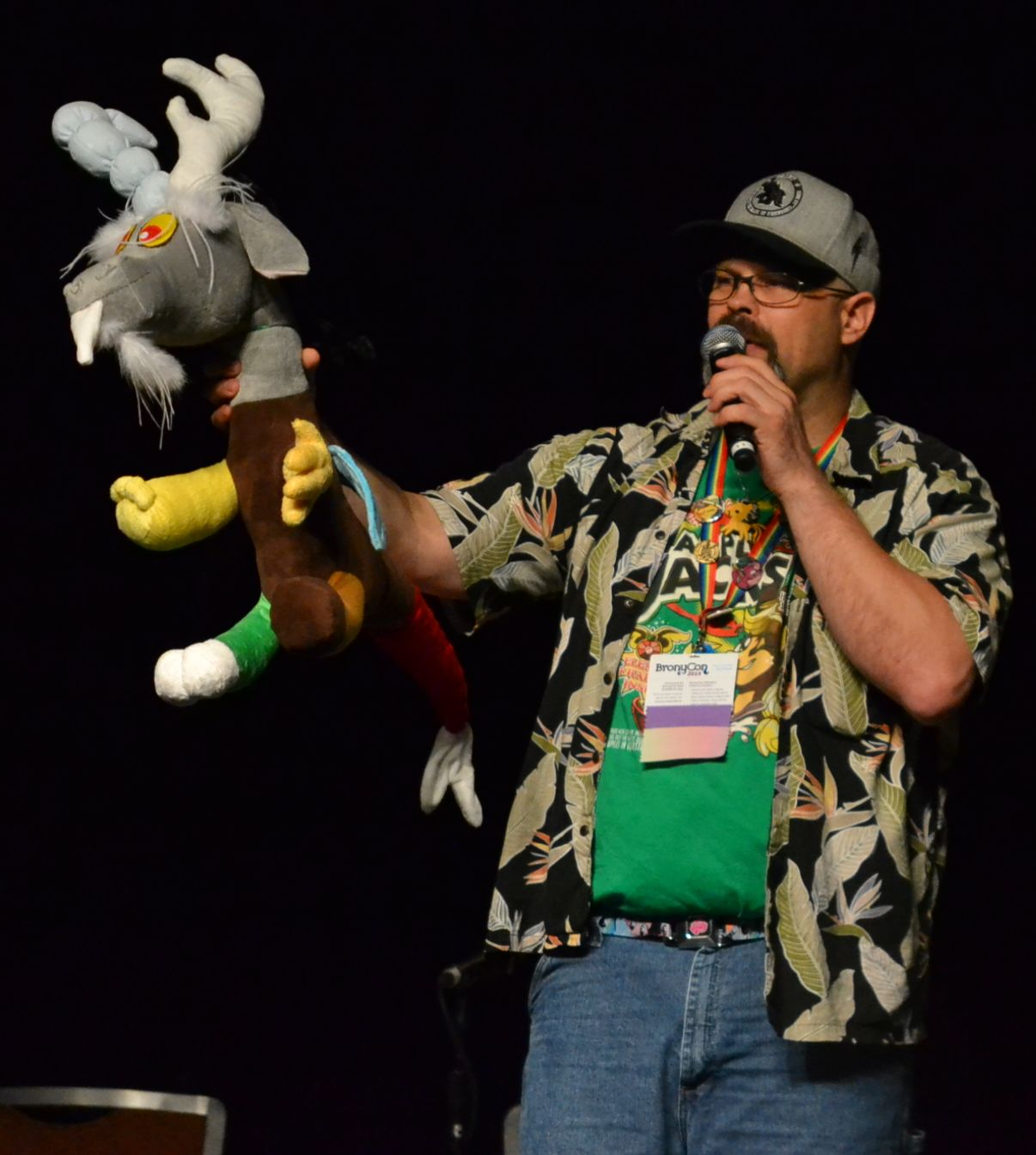
An auctioneer presenting a Discord plushie at the 2014 BronyCon charity auction, one of many charitable fundraising events organized by the My Little Pony: Friendship Is Magic fandom.

The adult fandom of the animated television series My Little Pony: Friendship Is Magic has established a tradition of charity and fundraising activities since the show's premiere in 2010. The adult fanbase, commonly known as bronies, has spawned various charitable organizations and initiatives, raised hundreds of thousands of dollars for various causes, and established formal non-profit organizations dedicated to philanthropic work.

Major charitable efforts include the Brony Thank You Fund—which became the first media-related fandom to achieve 501(c)(3) non-profit status and donated $50,000 to endow an animation scholarship at the California Institute of the Arts—and the organization Bronies for Good, which has coordinated blood drives and raised over $60,000 for charities likethe Children's Cancer Association, Room to Read, CureSearch for Children's Cancer, and Your Siblings. Individual campaigns have also achieved success, such as fundraising efforts that raised over $100,000 for a cancer fund to help the daughter of a close friend of show voice actor Tara Strong, and more than $72,000 to support an 11-year-old fan who attempted suicide after being bullied for watching the show.

Brony conventions regularly feature charity auctions and fundraising events as part of their programming. These events have collectively raised hundreds of thousands of dollars for various charitable causes; individual conventions have often raised tens of thousands of dollars for organizations like the Seattle Children's Hospital and CureSearch for Children's Cancer. The fandom's charitable activities have been recognized by media outlets and academics as a unique characteristic that differentiates it from other fan communities. Academic analyses have identified the show's positive messages about friendship and helping others as a significant driver of charitable participation among bronies.

== Notable organizations ==
The culture of charity and giving within the fandom of My Little Pony: Friendship Is Magic emerged shortly after the show's debut, paralleling the show's moral lessons of kindness and compassion.

=== Bronies for Good ===
Founded in 2011, the Bronies for Good group has coordinated blood drives and fundraising campaigns for multiple charitable organizations, raising over $60,000 during 2012 for charities like the Children's Cancer Association, Room to Read, CureSearch for Children's Cancer, and Your Siblings. Bronies for Good frequently has booths at brony conventions, and has received praised for their charitable efforts. According to Denis Drescher, co-director of Bronies for Good:

"[Charities usually] go to great lengths to appeal to donors [...] but what they don't do is to go to the same lengths to actually help those they proclaim to help. It is the rare charity that runs self-evaluations on its projects, tracks its impact, or changes its strategy in response to the results. [...] Hence, our mission [...] is as much about educating donors as it is about fundraising for these highly effective charities."

In December 2011, Bronies for Good collaborated with brony musicians to produce Smile, a charity album that benefited the Children's Cancer Association. The album raised $21,000 in under a month.

=== Brony Thank You Fund ===
The Brony Thank You Fund, originally established in 2012 to create a fan-funded advertisement thanking the show's creators, became a foundational charitable organization of the fandom. After exceeding its initial fundraising goal, the organization redirected surplus funds to Toys For Tots and subsequently incorporated as a formal non-profit organization in New Hampshire. The organization achieved 501(c)(3) status under United States law, becoming the first media-related fandom to achieve this designation. In December 2013, the Fund donated $50,000 to endow an animation scholarship in perpetuity at the California Institute of the Arts.

== Community efforts ==
=== Michael Morones ===
In January 2014, 11-year-old Michael Morones of North Carolina attempted suicide after being bullied by his schoolmates for liking the show. His subsequent hospitalization spurred a significant response from the brony community, including members of the show's cast and crew. They launched a charity drive to assist with medical expenses and establish a non-profit organization dedicated to fighting bullying. Within a week, these efforts raised over $48,000, and exceeded $72,000 within a month. Thousands of bronies showed their support for Morones by getting My Little Pony tattoos. Morones, whose suicide attempt left him in a vegetative state, died on October 27, 2021, at the age of 19.

=== Kiki's Cancer Fund ===
In February 2013, voice actor Tara Strong gained help from the fandom for her "Kiki's Cancer Fund" to help Kiki Havivy, the daughter of a close friend who had been diagnosed with a brain tumor. After posting on Twitter asking for help, Strong was able to raise $100,000 due to the support from bronies. Brittany Frederick of StarPulse praised the community effort, calling the brony fandom "a great fan base". Strong stated that the child "wouldn't be alive today without the MLP fans"; however, the girl subsequently died of her illness on June 7, 2013.

=== Other charity work ===
Additional charity work have included support for environmental causes, with show creator Lauren Faust enlisting help from bronies to raise money for the Wildlife Learning Center in California, with the Center offering to name some of its animals after characters in the show when certain donation levels were raised. The documentary film, Bronies: The Extremely Unexpected Adult Fans of My Little Pony, was funded several times over its requested Kickstarter amount, allowing the filmmakers to expand the scope of the project. An organized group of fans, the Humble Brony Bundle, accepted donations from its members towards the Humble Indie Bundle, a charitable indie game sales drive for Child's Play and the American Red Cross, which topped the contribution list for one sale and contributed the largest single donation for a later sale after a friendly competition with Minecraft developer Markus Persson. In the next major bundle, the same friendly rivalry topped the donation charts; the Humble Brony Bundle donated over US$13,000 and exceeded Persson's and the rest of the leaderboard's donation.

== Charity auctions ==
Charity auctions at brony conventions have become a standard feature and often raise tens of thousands of dollars towards various charitable causes. According to Theo A. Peck-Suzuki writing in the journal Transformative Works and Cultures, charity auctions at brony conventions are viewed as competitive spectacles where bronies bid on rare merchandise like signed prints from voice actors, worn lanyards, and unique convention posters, with value determined by the money participants are willing to spend for exclusive ownership; these auctions function as "tournaments of value" that allow winners to distinguish themselves within the brony community and affirm their belonging.

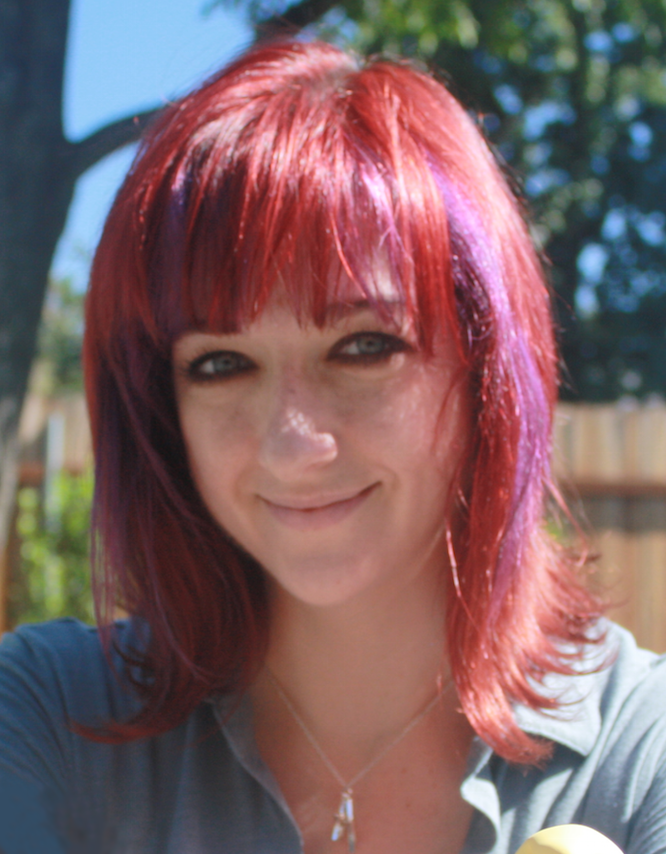
Lauren Faust, the creator of My Little Pony: Friendship Is Magic

In 2011, Lauren Faust, the creator of Friendship Is Magic, submitted original sketches of the show to a charity auction in the wake of the Tōhoku earthquake and tsunami that year; she raised $15,000 for Give2Asia.

In 2012, Everfree Northwest's charity auction raised $13,535 for the Seattle Children's Hospital. In 2015, BronyCon's charity auction raised $30,645 for CureSearch for Children's Cancer.

From 2014 to 2016, Ponyville Ciderfest raised a total of $26,758.50 for Extra Life 4 Kids from their charity auction. From 2017 to 2019, it raised $72,999.08 for Generations Against Bullying. Since 2021, the convention has supported the Wisconsin Humane Society, with the 2023 event raising $111,186.90. As of 2023, Ponyville Ciderfest has raised a total of $261,005.98.

From 2009 to 2019, UK PonyCon raised a total of £38,000 for the Riding for the Disabled Association (RDA). Following a virtual-only event in 2020 due to the COVID-19 pandemic that raised £3,424.47, UK PonyCon resumed in-person gatherings in 2021 and continued supporting the RDA. In total, UK PonyCon has raised over £100,000 for the RDA as of 2025.

Since 2023, Mare Fair—a brony convention held annually in Orlando, Florida—has worked with Fallen Oak Equine Rescue and Rehabilitation as their charity benefactor. Mare Fair's charity auction raised over $50,000 in 2023, $103,483 in 2024, and $115,660 in 2025.

== Analysis ==
In 2016, Pavol Kosnáč studied different types of bronies and found that 63% of fans said the show influenced their moral values, which created conditions that encouraged helping others. Kosnáč identified specific ways the show motivated charitable behavior: bronies described feeling a special kind of happiness from watching a show that promoted optimism, learning moral lessons that changed their behavior, and finding comfort that helped counter negative attitudes in society. Kosnáč found that the fan community's welcoming and protective culture, which developed partly because bronies faced criticism from outsiders, strengthened the expectation that members should help others. Many bronies reported significant personal transformations, with one describing how they changed from being "a cynical jerk" to "trying to be helpful" after watching the show.

In a 2018 study of the brony fandom, researchers sought to examine the psychology underlying the fandom's reputation for engaging in charitable activities. They found that bronies who watched more episodes of Friendship Is Magic demonstrated increased empathy and helping behavior; this correlation was not observed in fans of other media content. According to the study, bronies clearly recognized the show's moral lessons and rated it highly on virtues such as friendliness, helpfulness, and kindness, and that appreciation for these moral themes was directly linked to their enjoyment of the show. In turn, bronies reported engaging in more prosocial behavior both in-person and online after joining the fandom. Within the fandom itself, the most common forms of mutual aid involved emotional support and giving advice rather than direct financial assistance (e.g. "love and tolerate"). A separate study found that bronies who felt more particularly stigmatized for their participation in their fandom actually adhered more strongly to prosocial norms, such as being charitable.

== See also ==
- My Little Pony: Friendship Is Magic fandom
- Music of the My Little Pony: Friendship Is Magic fandom
- Art of the My Little Pony: Friendship Is Magic fandom
- Slang of the My Little Pony: Friendship Is Magic fandom
- My Little Pony fan convention
- Altruism
- Prosocial behavior
