= UK PonyCon =

Annual My Little Pony fan convention

- Official logo for UK PonyCon
- Status: Active
- Genre: My Little Pony fan convention
- Country: United Kingdom
- Inaugurated: November 2004
- Most recent: 30 October–1 November 2026
- Attendance: 1,300 (2024)
- Filing status: Company limited by guarantee
- Website: www.ukponycon.co.uk

UK PonyCon is an annual My Little Pony convention held in various cities across the United Kingdom organized for fans of My Little Pony. Although the con was established in 2004 (before the beginning of the brony phenomenon in 2010) intended for collectors of the My Little Pony toylines, the con has since become one of the most popular brony conventions in the world, owing to the large boost in popularity from the brony fandom. In 2024, UK PonyCon had an attendance of 1,300, the largest it has had in its 20-year history.

== Overview ==
UK PonyCon is the longest continuously running My Little Pony fan convention in the world, held annually in various cities across the United Kingdom since 2004. The convention brings together fans of all ages including collectors of the toy line and enthusiasts of the animated series, particularly My Little Pony: Friendship is Magic.

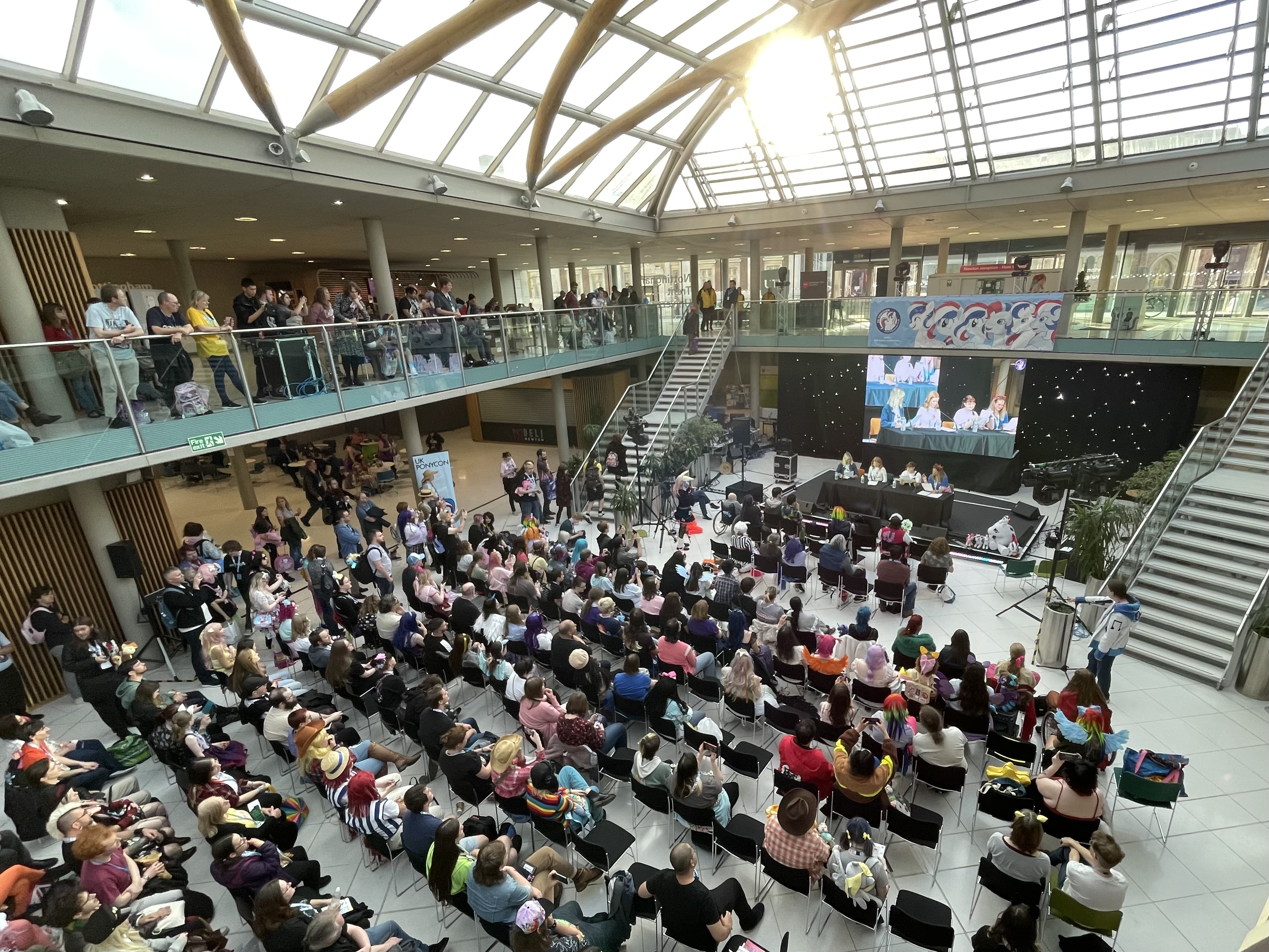
Attendees at UK PonyCon 2024, held in Nottingham

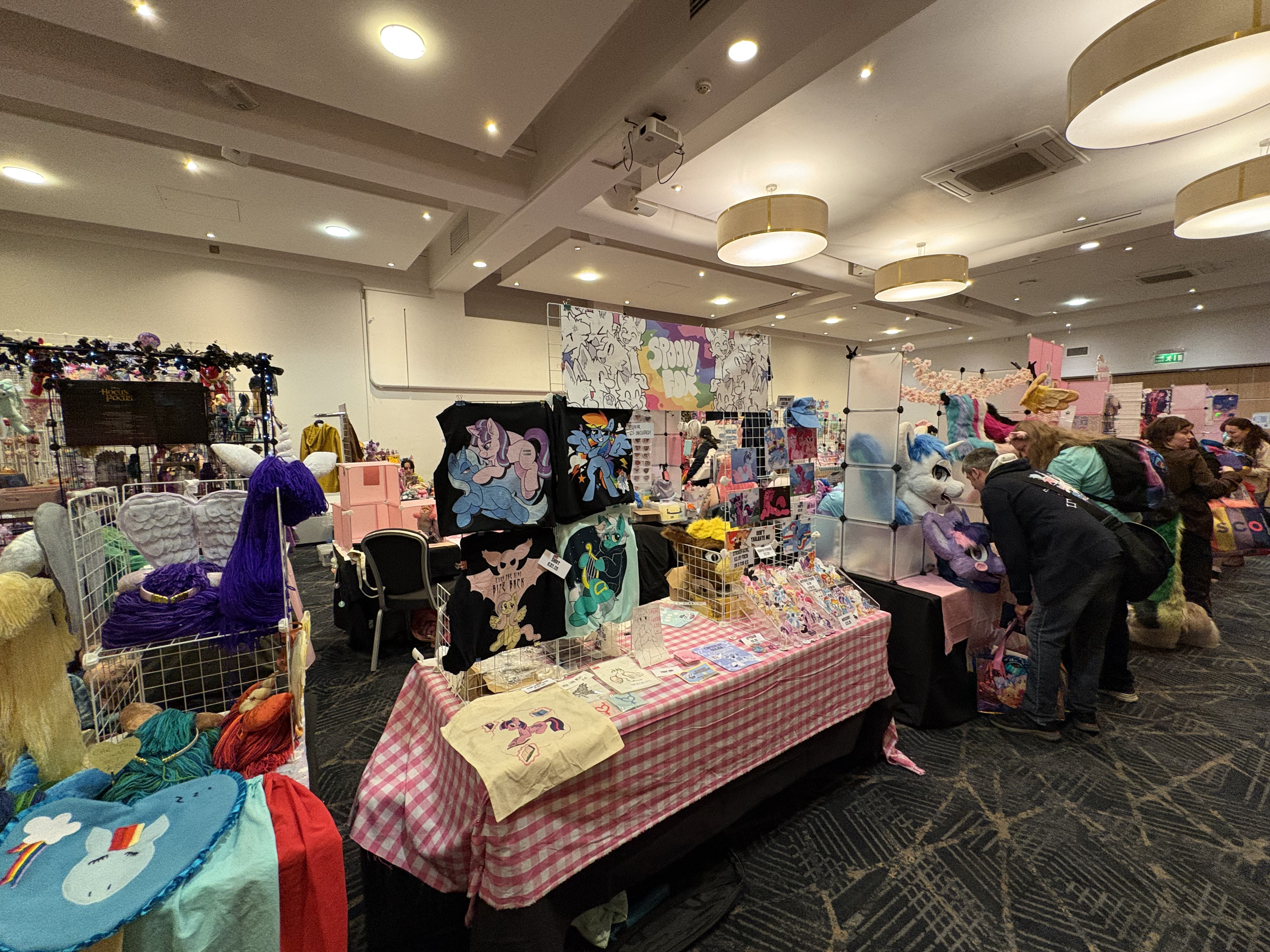
Vendor stalls at UK PonyCon 2025, held in Birmingham

The convention features various activities including vendor stalls selling collectibles and merchandise, discussion panels, cosplay opportunities, and themed events that change yearly. Its 2019 edition at Nottingham Trent University featured an "Ocean Adventure" theme with attendees dressed as nautical ponies, pirates, and cruise liners. Hasbro representatives were present at the 2012 UK PonyCon, and brought a limited-edition Friendship Is Magic Blind Bag pony.

UK PonyCon attracts an international audience, with visitors traveling from countries such as Germany, France, and the Czech Republic. The convention predates the My Little Pony: Friendship Is Magic fandom; the demographic of attendees has evolved over time, with an increasing presence of bronies (adult fans of My Little Pony).

As with other My Little Pony fan conventions, charitable fundraising is a major part of UK PonyCon, with the event raising money for different organizations over the years. Since 2009, the Riding for the Disabled Association (RDA) has been the primary beneficiary, with fundraising amounts growing from £700 in 2009 to £20,000 in 2024; over £100,000 has been raised in total for the RDA. The convention has moved between multiple cities including Morecambe, Manchester, Birmingham, Bristol, London, Sheffield, Brighton, Nottingham, Cardiff, and Leeds.

Ewan Kirkland, a professor of screen studies at the University of Brighton, has been a regular speaker at UK PonyCon since 2013.

== Locations, attendances, and charity efforts by year ==
Year	Dates	Location	Venue	Attendance	Charity	Amount raised
2004	November 27	Morecambe	The Platform		HAPPA	£100
2005	November 10–12	Manchester	Sacha's Hotel	300	Starlight Childrens Foundation	£250
2006	October 27–28	Birmingham	Britannia Hotel		Redwings Horse Sanctuary	£1,000
2007	October 26–27	Bristol	Redwood Hotel and Country Club	150	The Rainbow Centre	£5,000
2008	October 10–11	Uxbridge, London	The Barn, Brunel University	200	Wellchild	£5,059.91
2009	October 23–24	Sheffield	Megacentre	200	Riding for the Disabled Association	£700
2010	October 22–23	Birmingham	The Public, West Bromwich	150	Riding for the Disabled Association	£1,300
2011	October 21–22	Brighton	Brighton Racecourse	200	Riding for the Disabled Association	£750
2012	October 5–6	Nottingham	Jury's Hotel Long Eaton		Riding for the Disabled Association	£1,500
2013	September 7–8	Cardiff	Mercure Holland House Hotel and Spa	350	Riding for the Disabled Association	£2,000
2014	October 11–12	Leicester	Mercure Leicester The Grand Hotel	500	Riding for the Disabled Association	£2,500
2015	October 10–11	Leicester	Mercure Leicester The Grand Hotel	700	Riding for the Disabled Association	£2,500
2016	October 22–23	Leeds	The Royal Armouries	750	Riding for the Disabled Association	£3,000
2017	October 21–22	Bristol	UWE Bristol Exhibition and Conference Centre	800	Riding for the Disabled Association	£6,000
2018	October 13–14	Nottingham	Nottingham Conference Centre	1,000	Riding for the Disabled Association	£6,750
2019	October 12–13	Nottingham	Nottingham City Campus of NTU	950	Riding for the Disabled Association	£11,000
2020	Online only due to the COVID-19 pandemic					£3,424.47
2021	October 9–10	Nottingham	Nottingham City Campus of NTU	500	Riding for the Disabled Association	£10,095
2022	October 8–9	Nottingham	Nottingham City Campus of NTU	850	Riding for the Disabled Association	£11,000
2023	September 30–October 1	Nottingham	Nottingham City Campus of NTU	1,000	Riding for the Disabled Association	£12,124
2024	October 5–6	Nottingham	Nottingham City Campus of NTU	1,300	Riding for the Disabled Association	£20,000
2025	October 3–5	Birmingham	Birmingham Conference and Events Centre	985	Riding for the Disabled Association	£10,765
2026	30 October–1 November	Leicester	TBA	TBA	Riding for the Disabled Association	

== See also ==
- BronyCon
- Everfree Northwest
- TrotCon
- Ponyville Ciderfest
- My Little Pony fan convention
- Charity of the My Little Pony: Friendship Is Magic fandom
