= My Little Pony fan convention =

Formal gathering of fans of My Little Pony

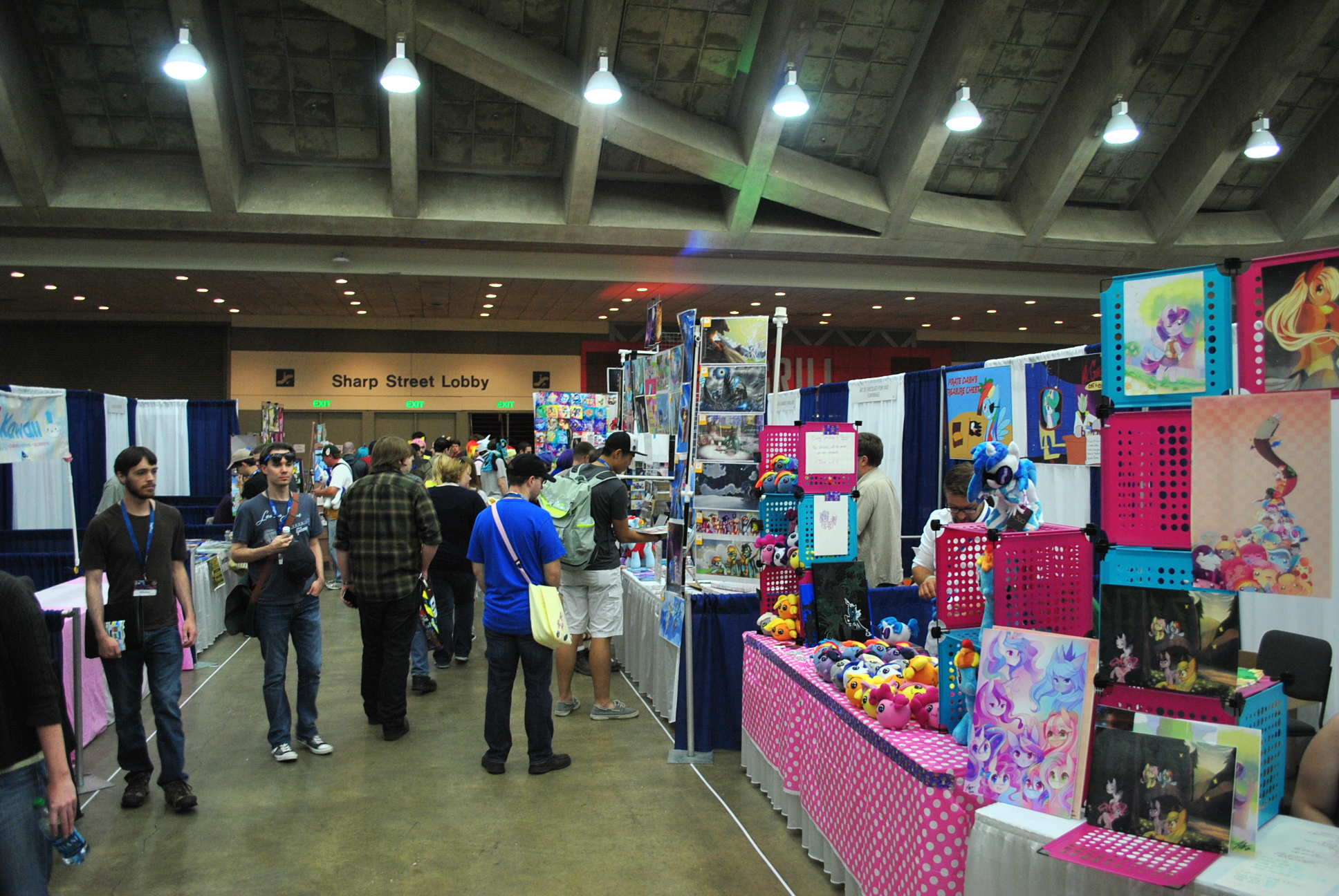
The vendor hall of BronyCon 2014 at the Baltimore Convention Center

A My Little Pony fan convention (also called a brony convention, brony con, or pony con) is a fan convention organized for the fandom of the animated television series My Little Pony: Friendship Is Magic, whose adult fans are commonly referred to as bronies. These conventions include panels, workshops, vendor halls, cosplay contests, and meet-and-greets with voice actors, writers, and other people involved in the production of the show. The largest brony convention, BronyCon, was first held in New York City in 2011 and initially attracted 100 attendees, but grew rapidly, reaching over 10,000 attendees in 2015.

My Little Pony fan conventions typically span a weekend and feature various community events, such as brony music concerts, charity auctions, and interactive activities with show staff. As of November 2026, despite the original television series ending in 2019, active conventions continue worldwide in various locations, including the United States, Canada, United Kingdom, Germany, Italy, the Netherlands, Russia, the Czech Republic, China, and South Korea. With the closure of BronyCon in 2019, Everfree Northwest is the largest brony convention in the world.

== History ==
=== 2011–2019: My Little Pony: Friendship Is Magic era ===
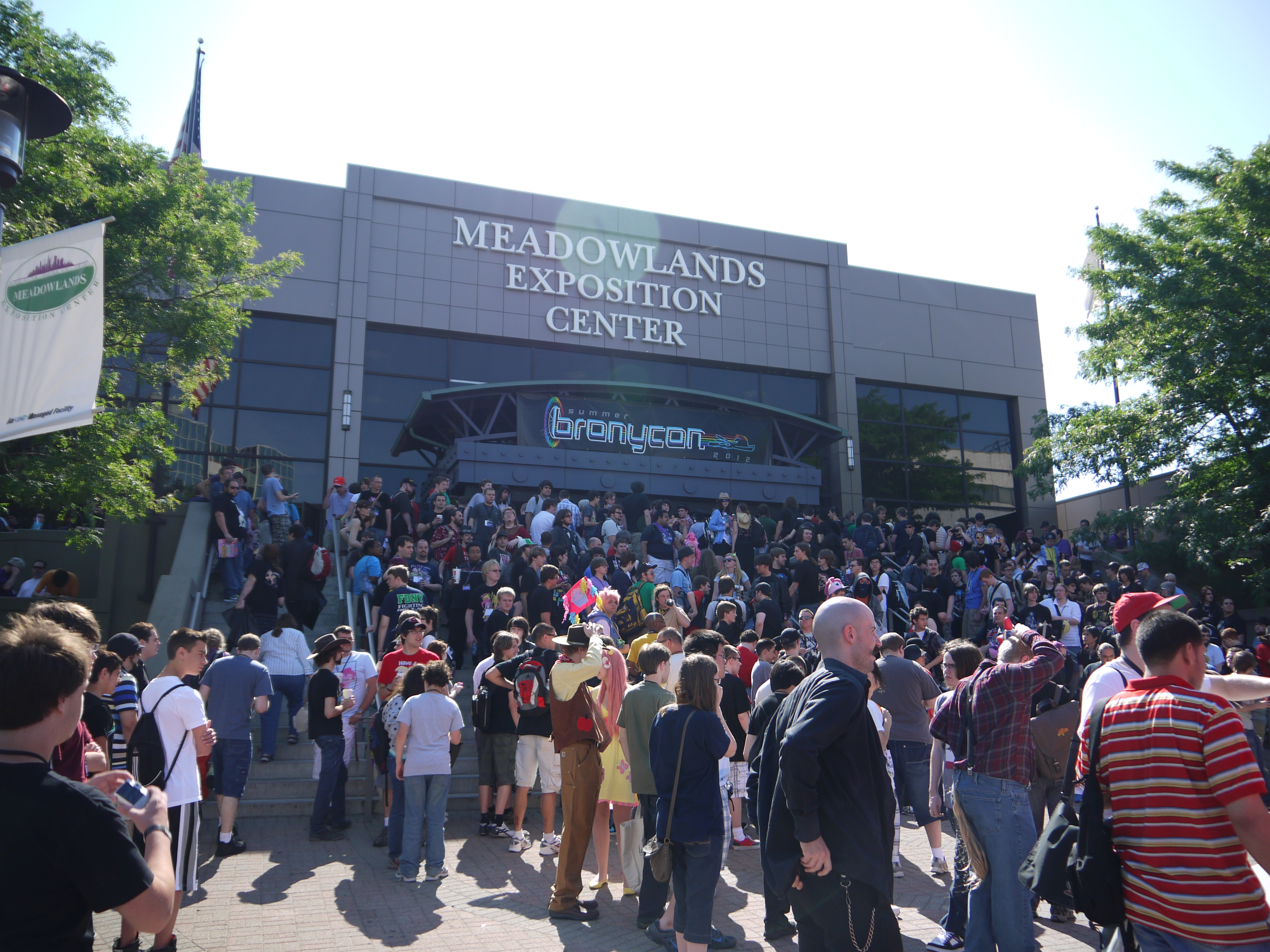
BronyCon 2012 at the Meadowlands Exposition Center

As the fandom grew between 2011 and 2012, nearly a dozen brony conventions were planned across the United States and internationally. Many of these conventions featured appearances by voice actors, writers, and other creative staff involved with the show who interacted directly with fans at panels, autograph sessions, and other convention activities.

BronyCon was the largest brony convention, held annually from 2011 to 2019. Initially established as a small gathering in New York City with approximately 100 attendees, BronyCon grew rapidly, eventually reaching a peak attendance of over 10,000 fans at its height. The convention was originally styled as "BroNYCon," referencing its New York City origins, but later dropped the "NYC" capitalization when it moved to venues outside the city. In 2012, the third BronyCon attracted 800 attendees, and the fourth in 2013 expanded to a two-day event at the Meadowlands Exposition Center in New Jersey in June 2012, drawing more than 4,000 attendees. In 2013, the convention permanently relocated to Baltimore, Maryland, and established itself as a 501(c)(3) non-profit organization under Lunar Solis Corp. Despite the brony fandom consisting predominantly of male fans (approximately 85% based on a 2013 unofficial survey), BronyCon attracted a more balanced demographic, with 34% female attendance at the 2014 convention. The event maintained a family-friendly atmosphere, with children under 14 comprising about 10% of attendees. In later years, BronyCon moved to the larger Baltimore Convention Center, with attendance exceeding 8,000. In 2015, BronyCon reached its peak attendance of over 10,000 guests, becoming the first brony convention to do so. The final BronyCon, held in 2019, also attracted over 10,000 attendees.

Other brony conventions founded during this period included Everfree Northwest in Seattle, Washington, Midwestria in Chicago, Illinois, Canterlot Gardens in Cleveland, Ohio, Equestria LA in Los Angeles, BABSCon in Burlingame, California, Ponycon NY in the metropolitan New York City region, BronyCAN in British Columbia, Canada, GalaCon in Ludwigsburg, Germany, BUCK in Manchester, United Kingdom, PonyCon AU in Sydney, Australia, Crystal Mountain Pony Con in Salt Lake City, Utah and Pacific PonyCon in San Diego, California. In addition, My Little Pony conventions established prior to the airing of Friendship Is Magic, such as the My Little Pony Fair and UK PonyCon, saw increases in their numbers due to the brony fandom. A long-running annual art show, the "My Little Pony Project", where artists re-imagine My Little Pony figurines and toys into works of art, also saw additional attendance and contributions from the brony community.

=== 2020–2021: COVID-19 pandemic ===
In late 2019 and early 2020, the COVID-19 pandemic forced organizers to cancel, postpone, or transition events to virtual formats. Vanhoover Pony Expo conducted its January 2022 event virtually using a Pony Town server that featured digitally recreated Vancouver landmarks.

=== 2021–present: Post-COVID era ===
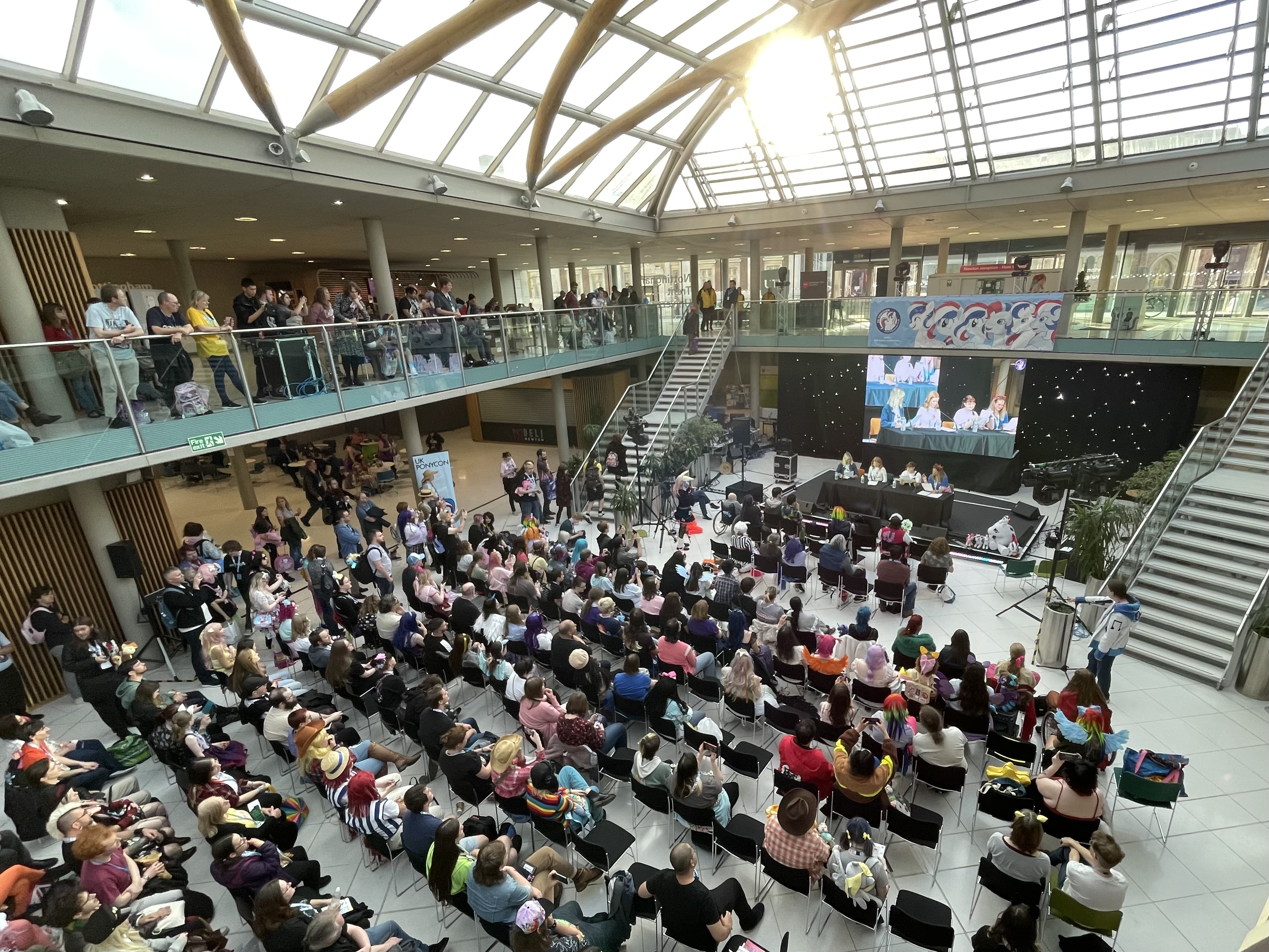
Attendees at UK PonyCon 2024, held in Nottingham, United Kingdom

As pandemic restrictions eased, brony conventions began returning to in-person formats. UK PonyCon 2021, Everfree Northwest 2021, and Ponyville Ciderfest 2021 were held in-person.

In February 2022, Corgi Events LLC—the parent organization of Ponyville Ciderfest and Whinny City Pony Con as well as five furry conventions—collapsed amid financial troubles including an exorbitant tax warrant against its founder, unpaid staff compensation, and management issues. Charlie Worthley, the convention chair of Ciderfest and Whinny City, initially stepped down due to the organizational turmoil. Michelle, Charlie's wife, purchased both conventions from the dissolving company and reinstated Charlie as chair of both events. In 2023, Ponyville Ciderfest raised $111,186.90 for charity.

In February 2024, the Mi Amore Fest in Moscow, Russia was closed early by organizers after Russian police investigated complaints that the convention promoted LGBTQ+ content. A few months prior to this incident, Russian film database Kinopoisk had marked My Little Pony: Friendship Is Magic as "18+", with some speculating that it was due to the name of Rainbow Dash, one of the main protagonists of the show. Police conducted two inspections but found no evidence of illegal activity. It was reported that in an attempt to avoid persecution, organizers of the convention had changed Rainbow Dash's rainbow-colored mane to the colors of the Russian flag. The incident occurred amid Russia's restrictions on LGBTQ rights in Russia, following the Russian Supreme Court's 2023 designation of the international LGBTQ movement as an extremist organization.

== Activities ==
=== Schedule and programming ===
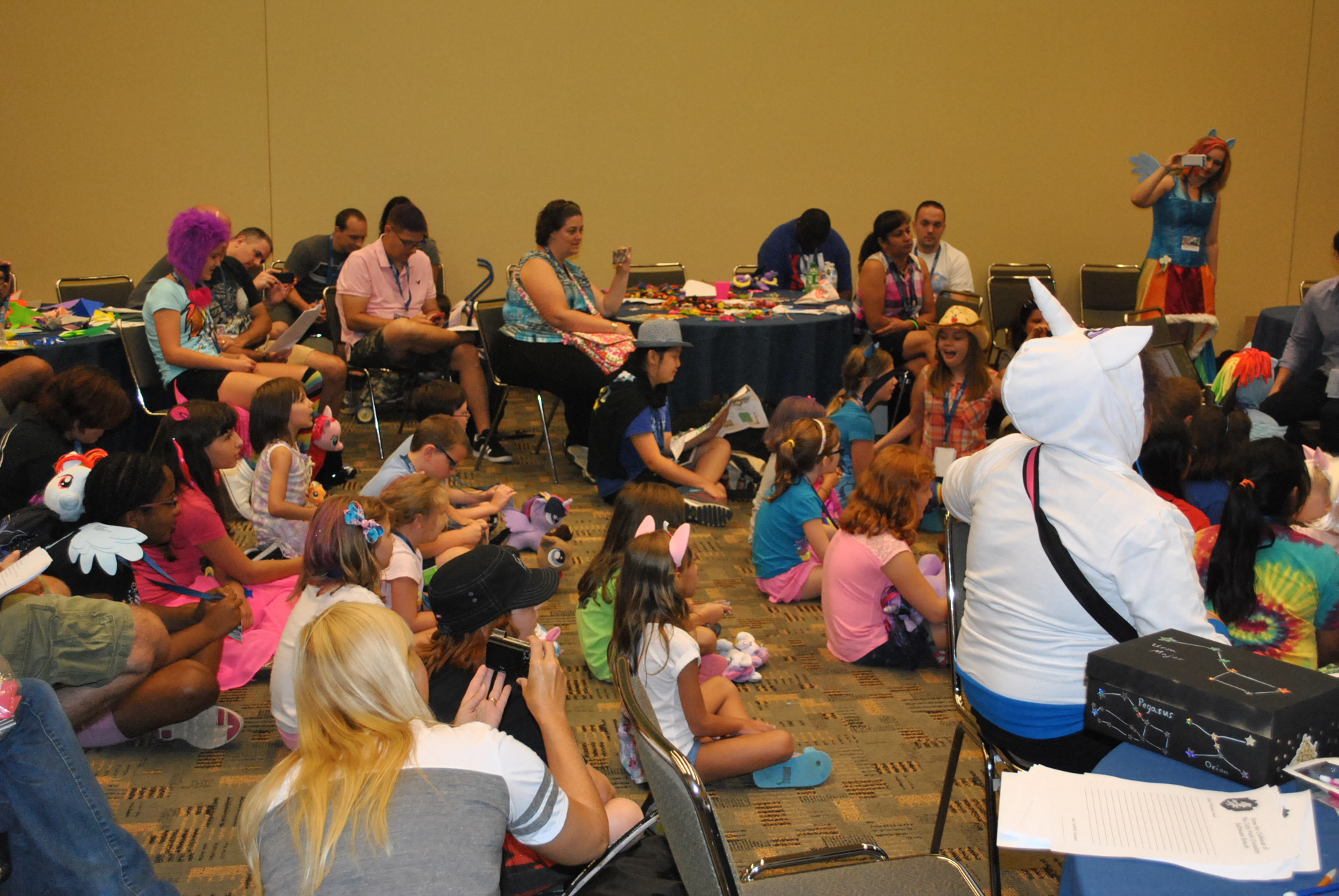
Fans of My Little Pony attending a workshop panel at BronyCon 2014

Typically spanning a weekend, pony conventions schedule activities from Friday morning through Sunday afternoon. Peak attendance tends to occur on Saturday. Some conventions offer discounted single-day admission options.

Conventions frequently feature presentations, panels, workshops, lectures, Q&As, karaoke, and autograph signings as part of their schedule. Information about a specific con can be found on their website or in their con book (or conbook), an informational pamphlet or booklet typically distributed at the convention. Con books also include maps of the venue, vendor listings, and information about the guests of honor. They also often include codes of conduct, welcome letters from organizers, staff listings, and sponsor acknowledgements. If a charity is being supported by the convention, it is often listed there.

=== Music concerts ===
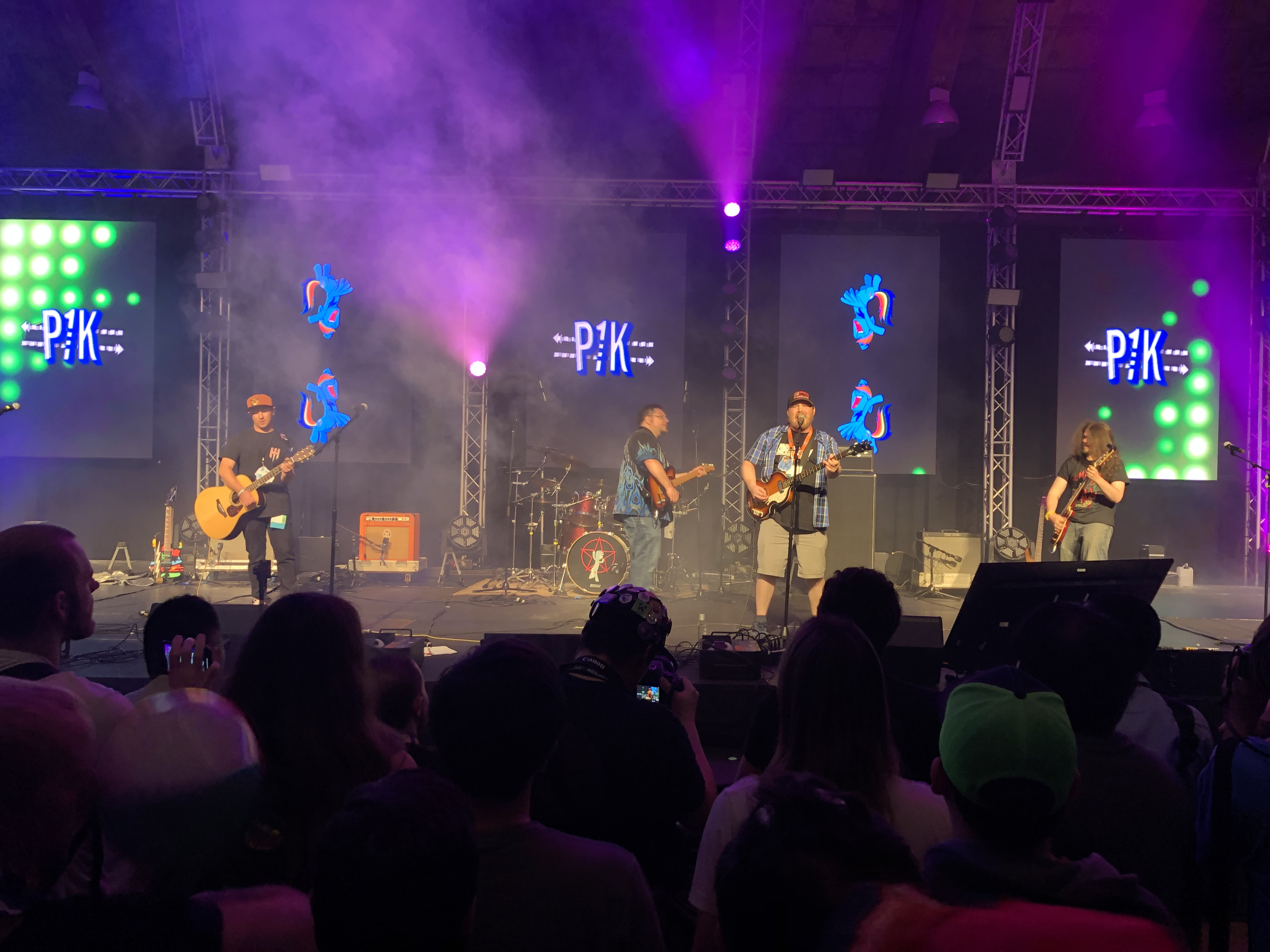
BronyPalooza at the Baltimore Convention Center during BronyCon 2019

The brony music scene spans numerous genres, including electronic dance music, rock, classical arrangements, and specialized fusion genres. Conventions often feature their own brony music concerts as part of their programming. BronyCon's music concert was called BronyPalooza, and Everfree Northwest's is called Ponystock.

=== Charity auctions ===
Brony conventions tend to be non-profit organizations with a heavy focus on charity. Charity auctions at brony conventions are viewed as competitive spectacles where attendees bid on rare merchandise like signed prints from voice actors, worn lanyards, and unique convention posters. Brony conventions have raised tens of thousands of dollars towards various charitable causes. In 2012, Everfree Northwest's charity auction raised $13,535 for the Seattle Children's Hospital. In 2015, BronyCon's charity auction raised $30,645 for CureSearch for Children's Cancer.

== List of conventions ==
Attendance numbers at brony conventions. Missing data points indicate no reported attendance figures or canceled events. The 2020–2021 period saw many cancellations due to the COVID-19 lockdowns. View source data.

=== Active events ===
Next/Last held	Name	Place
8–10 January 2027	Vanhoover Pony Expo	Vancouver, Canada
	Founded in 2019 following the cessation of BronyCAN in 2017, Vanhoover Pony Expo is a family-friendly convention "carries forward the legacy of the brony community in Canada."	
26–28 February 2027	HarmonyCon	Dallas, Texas, United States
	Convention in Dallas, Texas themed around music, with a Coltchella concert event. Notable for its "neat interactive website".	
21–22 March 2026	Festival of Friendship	Southampton, Hampshire, United Kingdom
	A smaller UK-based convention for the My Little Pony fandom.	
5–6 April 2025	Ponies Online	Discord (virtual), International
	Virtual convention held on Discord.	
1–3 May 2026	NeighCon	Baltimore, Maryland, United States
	Maryland-based brony convention	
2–3 May 2026	Griffish Isles	Manchester, United Kingdom
	UK-based convention held in Manchester.	
6–7 June 2026	EponaFest	Cremona, Italy
	Italian My Little Pony convention held in Cremona.	
12-14 June 2026	Everfree Encore	Uslar, Germany
	Musical convention hosted in Germany.	
17-19 July 2026	Sunshine PonyCon	Atlantic City, NJ, United States
	Family-friendly convention in Atlantic City, New Jersey, themed around a summer vacation on the Atlantic City Boardwalk, with fan panels, art workshops, musical performances, cosplay gatherings, community meetups, trinket trading, and outdoor beach and boardwalk activities. Its inaugural event was held July 17–19, 2026.	
18-19 July 2026	China Southern Brony Carnival	Guangzhou, China
	One of the major Chinese brony conventions.	
24–26 July 2026	TrotCon	Columbus, Ohio, United States
	Founded in 2012 by members who had previously been involved in organizing anime conventions throughout Ohio, the first TrotCon was held at the Ohio State University's Union.	
1 August 2026	MalangPony	Seoul, South Korea
	A My Little Pony convention in Seoul, South Korea.	
9–11 July 2027	Everfree Northwest	Bellevue, Washington, United States
	One of the longest-running and largest brony conventions in the Pacific Northwest region of the United States. The event describes its mission as bringing "Equestria to Earth for three days". As of September 2026, Everfree Northwest is the largest brony convention in the world.	
28–30 August 2026	Mare Fair	Orlando, Florida, United States
	First held in 2023, Mare Fair is an adults-only My Little Pony fan convention organized by Snowpity, Inc., in Orlando, Florida.	
5–6 September 2026	GalaCon	Waiblingen, Germany
	Europe's largest My Little Pony fan convention, founded in 2012. The convention reaches over 1,000 attendees and features the signature Gala Ball as its centerpiece event.	
13–14 September 2025	RuBronyCon	Moscow, Russia
	Largest brony convention in Russia taking place in Moscow.	
18–20 September 2026	SeaquestriaFest	Ocean City, Maryland, United States
	Themed convention based on the underwater realm of Seaquestria from the My Little Pony franchise.	
30 October–1 November 2026	UK PonyCon	Birmingham, United Kingdom
	UK My Little Pony convention that existed prior to 2010, but subsequently saw massive increases in attendance due to the brony fandom.	
23–25 October 2026	Ponycon Holland	Zeist, Netherlands
	Dutch convention for My Little Pony fans.	
20–22 November 2025	Ponyville Ciderfest	Milwaukee, Wisconsin, United States
	Founded in 2014 and organized by Worthwhile Events NFP, Ponyville Ciderfest is a pony con in Milwaukee that attracts fans of My Little Pony for a weekend of panels, music events, vendor halls, and charity fundraising that has collected over $261,000 throughout its span.	
5–7 December 2025	The Hearth's Warming Club	Ithaca, New York, United States
	A relatively small event held in December and likewise themed after the holiday season and the fictional holiday Hearth's Warming Eve.	
5–7 June 2026	Whinny City Pony Con	Chicago, Illinois, United States
21–23 August 2026	Czequestria	Prague, Czech Republic
	Largest brony convention in the Czech Republic, founded in 2014	
30 October–1 November 2026	FresMare	Fresno, California, United States
	A My Little Pony convention in Fresno, California.	
12–14 March 2027	Spring Sun Celebration	Bologna, Italy
	An Italian My Little Pony Mini Convention held in Bologna	
10–11 July 2027	Hop's Featherfest	Vienna, Austria
	A My Little Pony convention in Vienna, Austria.	

=== Discontinued events ===
Last held	Name	Place
1–4 August 2019	BronyCon	Baltimore, Maryland, United States
	Founded in 2011 in New York City, BronyCon began as a small gathering of approximately 100 people. The convention experienced rapid growth, moving to Secaucus, New Jersey in 2012 before permanently relocating to the Baltimore Convention Center in 2013. BronyCon was the largest My Little Pony fan convention in the world, reaching a peak attendance of 10,215 at its final event in 2019.	
14–16 September 2012	Midwestria	Chicago, Illinois, United States
	Brony convention held in St. Charles, Illinois.	
28–30 September 2012	Canterlot Gardens	Cleveland, Ohio, United States
	Voice actor Tara Strong attended in full Twilight Sparkle cosplay.	
25–27 August 2017	BronyCAN	Richmond, British Columbia, Canada
	Canada's first brony convention, held annually from 2013 to 2017 at the Executive Hotel Vancouver Airport. The convention peaked at over 1,000 attendees and was succeeded by Vanhoover Pony Expo in 2019.	
17–19 November 2017	Equestria LA	Los Angeles, California, United States
	Southern California's brony convention that catered to the My Little Pony fan community in the Los Angeles area.	
April 2014	BUCK	Manchester, United Kingdom
	A major My Little Pony fan convention in the United Kingdom that attracted international attention, featured on National Geographic Australia's "Darren McMullen's Outsiders" program.	
18–20 April 2025	BABSCon	Burlingame, California, United States
	Founded in 2014 in California, BABSCon was the first pony con in the Bay Area and became the second-largest brony con in the world. The final BABSCon took place in 2025.	
31 August–1 September 2018	Crystal Mountain Pony Con	Salt Lake City, Utah, United States
	Brony convention from 2013 to 2018 that took place in Salt Lake City.	

== See also ==
- Furry convention
- My Little Pony: Friendship is Magic fandom
- Music of the My Little Pony: Friendship Is Magic fandom
- Art of the My Little Pony: Friendship Is Magic fandom
