= BABSCon =

Discontinued My Little Pony fan convention

- Status: Defunct
- Genre: My Little Pony fan convention
- Venue: Hyatt Regency San Francisco Airport
- Location: Burlingame, California
- Country: United States
- Inaugurated: 18–20 April 2014
- Most recent: 18–20 April 2025
- Attendance: 2,084 in 2025
- Website: https://babscon.com/

BABSCon (short for Bay Area Brony Spectacular, a reference to the character Babs Seed from "One Bad Apple") was an annual brony convention held in the San Francisco Bay Area organized for the fandom of the animated television series My Little Pony: Friendship Is Magic, whose adult fans are commonly referred to as bronies. In 2019, BABSCon was the third-largest brony convention in the United States.

BABSCon operated from April 2014 until its cessation in April 2025.

== Overview ==
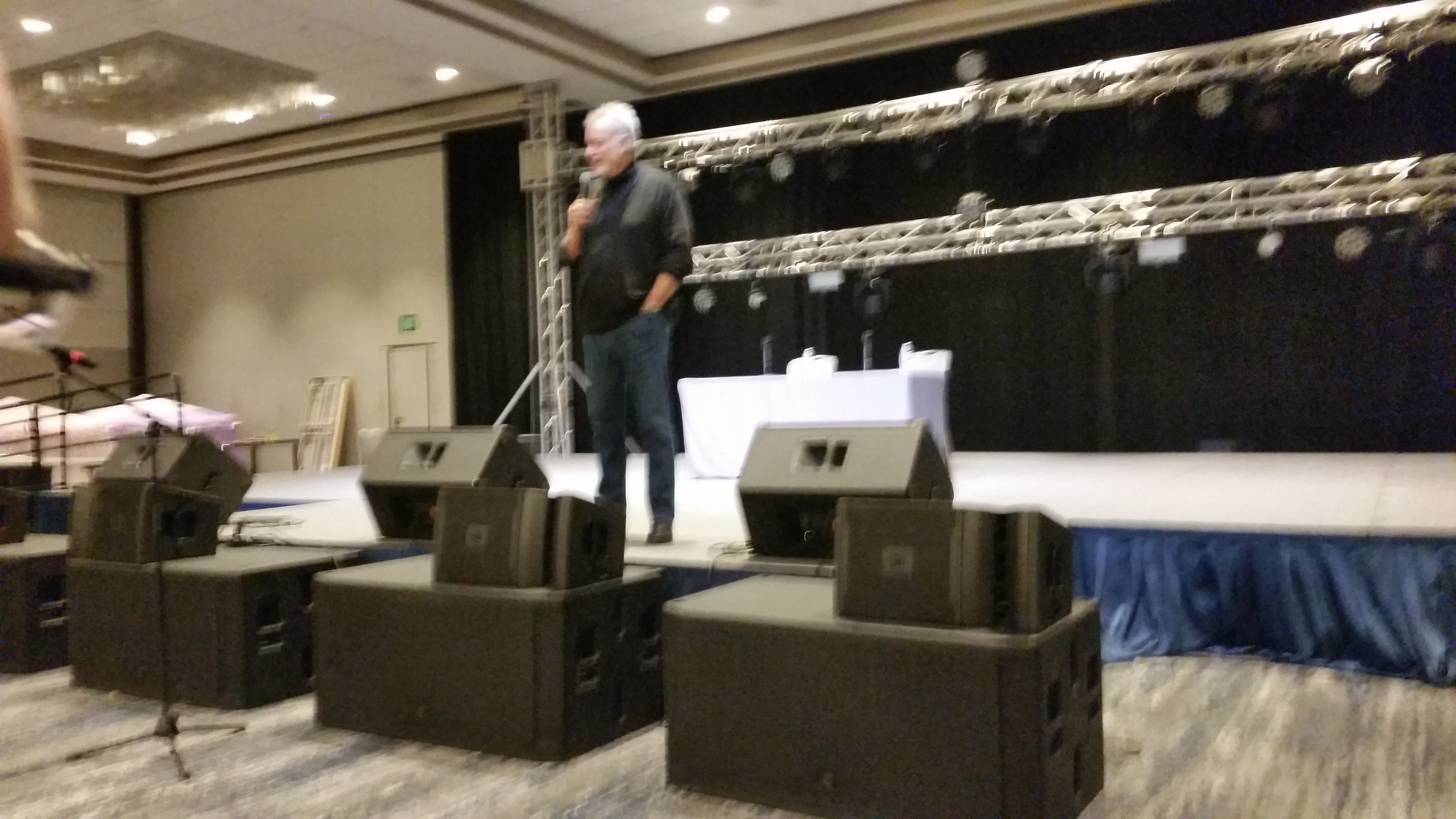
John de Lancie, the voice actor for Discord, at a Q&A panel at BABSCon 2018

BABSCon is an annual convention primarily dedicated to fans of the animated television show My Little Pony: Friendship is Magic, particularly the adult fans known as bronies. The convention was founded in 2013 by Sonya Hipper and co-founded by Sophianna Ardinger. The event features a rainbow-maned, yellow pony mascot named Golden Gates.

BABSCon was the first brony convention in the San Francisco Bay Area and was described by its founders as the "fandom version of Burning Man." In 2019, the convention was the third-largest brony convention in the United States (after BronyCon and Everfree Northwest) and attracted approximately 2,000 attendees.

In 2015, Samuel Miller presented his doctoral research on the brony fandom at a BABSCon panel and subsequently published it in The Journal of Men's Studies.

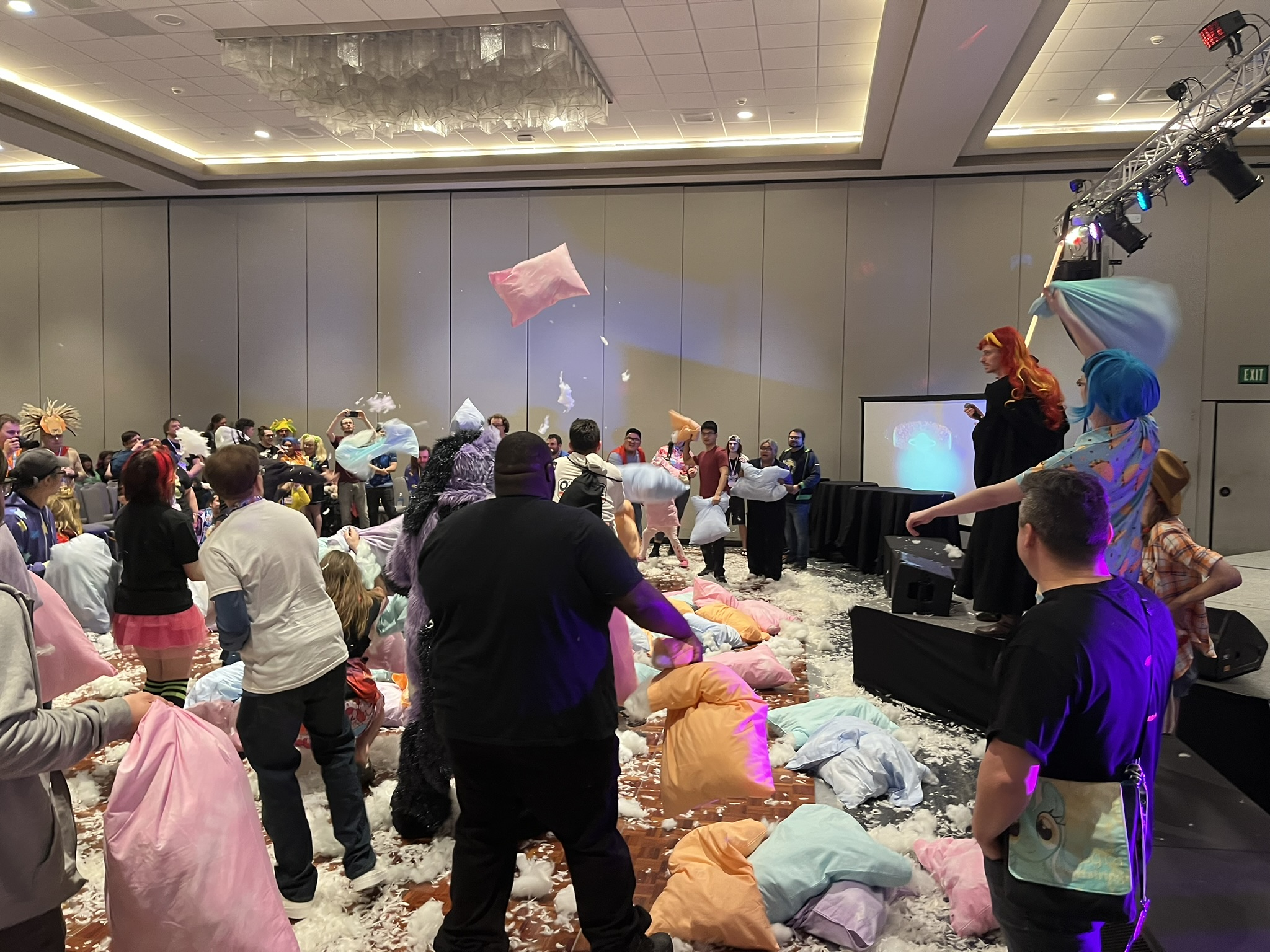
2025 BABSCon's Pillow Fight event

BABSCon themes included: a cinema-themed "And, Action!" in 2017; a renaissance-based "Fables and Fantasy" in 2018; "Cyberpunk City" in 2019; "SPAAACE!" from 2020–2022; a 90s styled "Memory Lane" in 2023; "Sweet Tooth" in 2024; and finally a "Slumber Party" theme in 2025.

=== Burning Mare and Pinkaboo's Neighhem ===
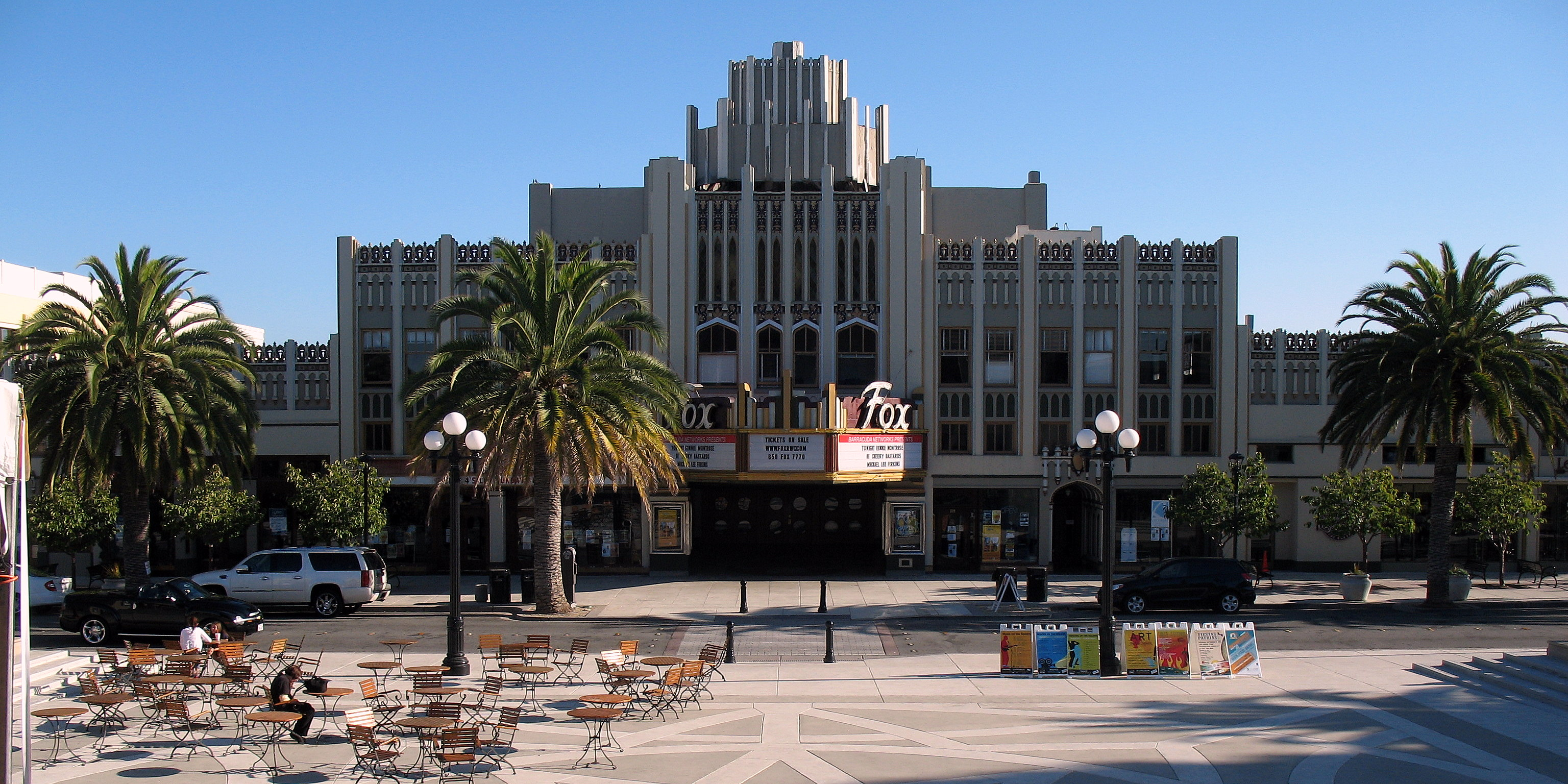
The Fox Theatre in Redwood City, California

In March 2025, the BABSCon convention chairs dismissed its music concert coordinator, Pinkaboo. The decision prompted all of its brony musicians to withdraw from the official concert. With funding from 15 (the creator of 15.ai) and a separate GoFundMe campaign, Pinkaboo and the musicians organized an alternative event called "Pinkaboo's Neighhem" that was to be held immediately after the end of the convention at the Fox Theatre in Redwood City, California.

BABSCon promised an alternative concert and proposed the event "Burning Mare" which would take place on Saturday night. On April 11th, they announced their headliner, Mystery Skulls, with alternative musical acts "Tuo Li presents Brony Syndrome", HTO (The Summoning); as well as the events "Party Cannon Panel" with guest Elley-Ray Hennessy, "The Burning", and "The wedding of Cadence and Twilight and the Final Ca-Dance Party".

== Locations, attendances, charity totals, and notable guests by year ==
Year	Dates	Location	Venue	Attendance	Charity Recipient	Charity Total	Notable guests
2014	April 18–20	Burlingame, California	Hyatt Regency San Francisco Airport	~2,350			Amy Keating Rogers, Andrea Libman, Andy Price, Ashleigh Ball, Brian Drummond, Cathy Weseluck, Jayson Thiessen, Meghan McCarthy, Nicole Oliver, Peter New, Tabitha St. Germain, Tara Strong
2015	April 3–5	Burlingame, California	Hyatt Regency San Francisco Airport	2,648	San Francisco Suicide Prevention, New Horizon School and Learning Center		Andrea Libman, Brian Drummond, Bryanna Drummond, Cathy Weseluck, Daniel Ingram, Gillian "GM" Berrow, Heather Breckel, Ian James Corlett, Maryke Hendrikse, Peter New, Rebecca Shoichet, Tara Strong, Tony Fleecs
2016	April 20–24	Burlingame, California	Hyatt Regency San Francisco Airport	~2,100	LYRIC, Doctors without borders		Andrea Libman, Andy Price, Gillian "GM" Berrow, John de Lancie, Kelly Sheridan, Lauren Faust, Nicole Oliver
2017	April 14–16	Burlingame, California	Hyatt Regency San Francisco Airport	1,772	San Francisco Suicide Prevention, LYRIC		Andy Price, Ashleigh Ball, Peter New, Tabitha St. Germain, Tara Strong, Tony Fleecs
2018	March 30–April 1	Burlingame, California	Hyatt Regency San Francisco Airport	1,663	Guitars Not Guns, The Game Academy	$15,066	Amy Keating Rogers, Andrea Libman, Bill Newton, Brenda Hickey, Christina Rice, Heather Breckel, John de Lancie, Kelly Sheridan, Nicole Dubuc, Trevor Devall
2019	April 19–22	Burlingame, California	Hyatt Regency San Francisco Airport	1,599	Billy DeFrank LGBTQ Center of Silicon Valley, Parents Helping Parents Inc.	$12,890	Agnes Garbowska, Andy Price, Bill Newton, Bryan Hohlfeld, Josh Haber, Kazumi Evans, Maurice LaMarche, Mike Vogel, Nicole Dubuc, Rebecca Shoichet, Sara Richard, Shannon Chan-Kent, Tabitha St. Germain, Tony Fleecs
2020	Cancelled due to the COVID-19 pandemic						
BABSConline 2020	May 8–9	Online	BABSCon Discord server		N/A	N/A	Brian Drummond, Claire Corlett, Peter New, Sunny Westbrook
2021	Cancelled due to the COVID-19 pandemic						
2022	April 15–17	Burlingame, California	Hyatt Regency San Francisco Airport	1,512	The Game Academy	$21,445.75	Andy Price, Grey DeLisle, Nicole Oliver, Peter New, Vincent Tong
2023	April 7–9	Burlingame, California	Hyatt Regency San Francisco Airport	~800	Trans Lifeline	$20,000	Charlotte Fullerton, Gillian "GM" Berrow, Katrina Salisbury, Sarah-Nicole Robles, Thom Zahler, Tony Fleecs
2024	March 29–31	Burlingame, California	Hyatt Regency San Francisco Airport	~700	Angela's House, SF LGBT Center	$25,250	Andrea Libman, Andy Price, Elley-Ray Hennessy, Jeremy Whitley
2025	April 18–20	Burlingame, California	Hyatt Regency San Francisco Airport	2,084	Frameline	$35,708	Andrea Libman, Andy Price, Ashleigh Ball, Elley-Ray Hennessy, Tabitha St. Germain, Thom Zahler, Tony Fleecs

== See also ==
- BronyCon
- Everfree Northwest
- BronyCAN
- TrotCon
- Ponyville Ciderfest
- My Little Pony fan convention
