= Crystal Mountain Pony Con =

Discontinued My Little Pony fan convention

- Status: Defunct
- Genre: My Little Pony fan convention
- Venue: Utah Valley Convention Center
- Location: Salt Lake City, Utah
- Country: United States
- Inaugurated: 5–6 April 2013
- Most recent: 31 August–1 September 2018
- Website: https://crystalponycon.com/

Crystal Mountain Pony Con was an annual My Little Pony fan convention held in Salt Lake City, Utah, organized for the fandom of the animated television series My Little Pony: Friendship Is Magic, whose adult fans are commonly referred to as bronies. Founded in 2013, Crystal Mountain Pony Con was the first My Little Pony fan convention held in Utah.

The final edition of Crystal Mountain Pony Con was held 31 August–1 September 2018 at the Utah Valley Convention Center.
