= Music of the My Little Pony: Friendship Is Magic fandom =

Music subculture of My Little Pony fans

The official poster for Pinkaboo's Neighhem, a brony music concert that took place in April 2025 at the Fox Theatre after the final BABSCon.

The music of the My Little Pony: Friendship is Magic fandom (also known as the brony fandom) has developed into a large subculture, often referred to as brony music, since the show's premiere in 2010. Fan-created music encompasses multiple genres and styles, including classical guitar, rock, and electronic dance music, and has developed distinct subgenres. A number of brony artists have achieved significant followings both within and outside the fandom, with several tracks going viral on the Internet. According to a 2018 study on the brony fandom, 70% of respondents reported that they listened to brony music daily.

One of the most recognizable aspects of the brony fandom, brony music has even fostered collaborations between fan creators and official voice actors from the show. Despite the conclusion of the television series in 2019, the brony fandom continues to produce new content, with brony music evolving from largely remixes of the show to songs that sometimes have minimal direct references to the episodes. Some brony music artists and albums, such as Vylet Pony's Love & Ponystep (2025), have achieved mainstream musical recognition.

Brony conventions, such as BronyCon and Everfree Northwest, feature brony musicians at their dedicated music concerts. Some brony musicians, such as The Living Tombstone and Odyssey Eurobeat, who gained popularity creating pony-themed content, have transitioned to mainstream music careers. The musical subgenres of ponystep (brony-inspired dubstep) and ponybeat (brony-inspired Eurobeat) have become part of the fandom's distinctive vernacular.

== Overview ==
The musical subculture of the My Little Pony: Friendship Is Magic fandom emerged almost immediately following the show's premiere in October 2010. Within two years of the show's premiere, the fan music scene grew substantially, with the fandom news website Equestria Daily regularly featuring new songs and albums. Many fan-created compositions were inspired by the show's own music composed by Daniel Ingram, the show's composer. As the brony community grew, music creation became one of its most prolific creative outlets. The characters of Friendship Is Magic are cited as an inspiration to musical compositions created by brony musicians.

=== Pony music videos (PMVs) ===
In addition to creating original music, the brony fandom produces numerous "pony music videos" (PMVs), analogous to anime music videos (AMVs) in anime fandoms. Like AMVs, PMVs typically feature clips from the show synchronized to music, often accompanied by visual effects, transitions, and sometimes original animation.

=== Ponies at Dawn (P@D) ===
Founded in 2012, Ponies at Dawn is a compilation album project featuring music from the fandom. As of October 2026, Ponies at Dawn continues to produce pony-themed tracks. The label has released 31 compilation albums, each featuring tens of songs.

== History ==
=== 2010–2019: My Little Pony: Friendship Is Magic era ===
"Heavy Is the Crown (instrumental)"
A piece of symphonic metal music inspired by My Little Pony: Friendship Is Magic, performed by L-Train & the Royal Canterlot Symphonic Metal Orchestra

The My Little Pony: Friendship Is Magic fandom's musical output is considered unique in its enormous volume compared to other fandoms' musical subcultures, spanning a large range of musical content, including classical guitar, electronic dance music, and rock. Several brony musicians have millions of subscribers on YouTube, and many more have more than 100,000 subscribers. In 2011, EverFree Radio—a brony music stream—identified nearly 5,000 pony-related songs, and subsequently streamed brony music 24 hours a day. Musicians from various countries contributing across multiple musical styles including metal, rock, electronic, and specialized subgenres like "dubtrot" (also known as "ponystep"), as a brony version of dubstep remixed with pony voices; and "ponybeat", for brony-inspired Eurobeat popularized by fandom musician Odyssey Eurobeat (formerly known as Eurobeat Brony). Fan musicians frequently created remixes and covers of original songs from the show, which were supported by Ingram. The Equestrian Beats website was established to promote and preserve the remix culture around the show's original songs.

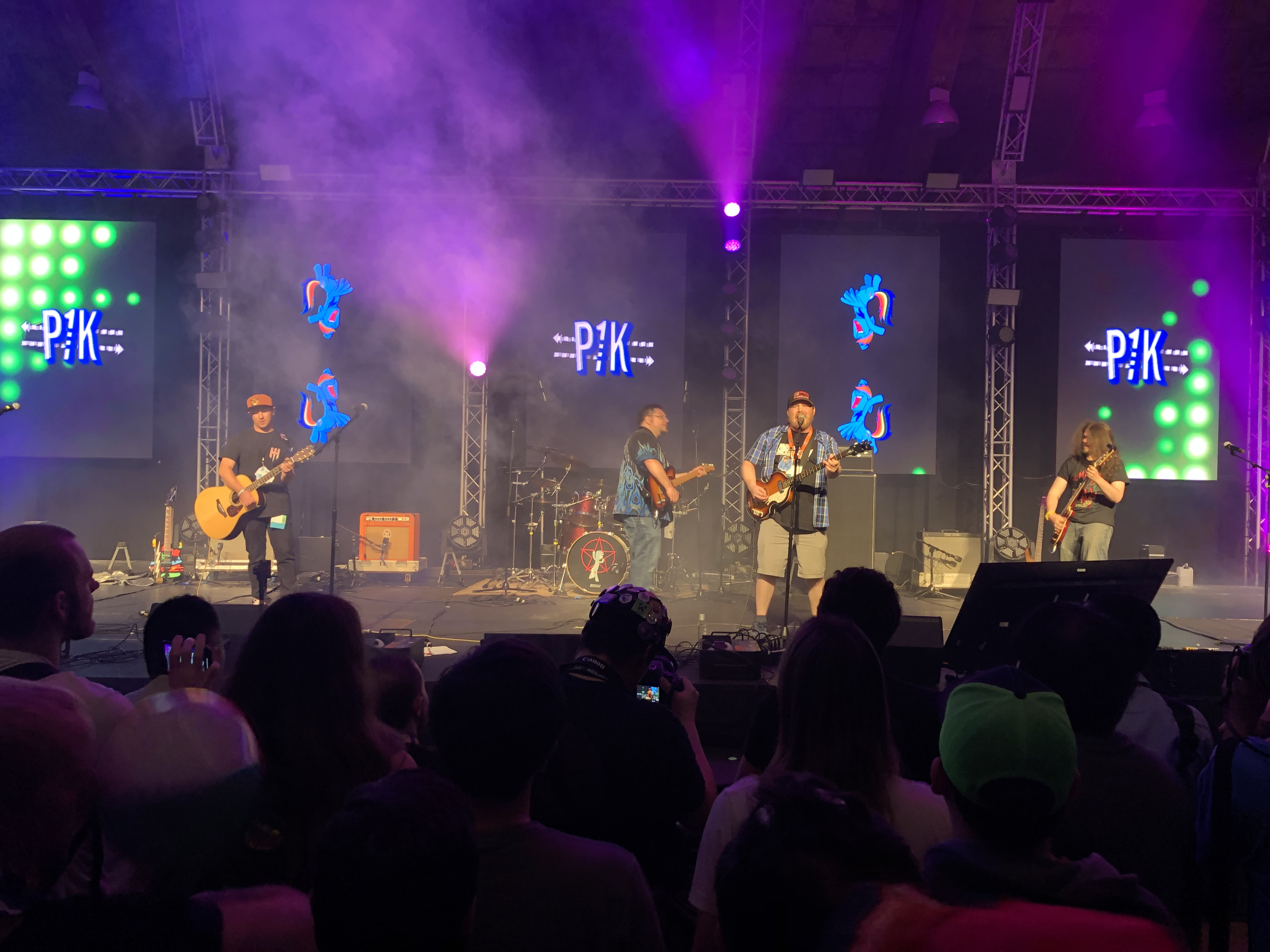
BronyPalooza at the Baltimore Convention Center during BronyCon 2019.

Odyssey Eurobeat was the first person to remix a song from the show. In November 2011, Ken Ashcorp released the song "20 Percent Cooler", a reference to Rainbow Dash's catchphrase from the episode "Suited for Success". In December 2011, a number of brony musicians collaborated with the charity Bronies for Good to produce Smile, a charity album that benefited Children's Cancer Association, which raised $21,000 in less than a month. In 2012, Archie V. became the first brony musician signed to a record label (Kontor Records). Michelle Creber, the voice actor for Apple Bloom in Friendship Is Magic, collaborated with fan musician MandoPony in album tracks. A brony music festival called Ponystock is featured as part of the convention Everfree Northwest; the music festival at BronyCon was called "BronyPalooza", which featured popular fandom musicians like Silva Hound (who would later go on to write fan songs inspired by Hazbin Hotel, including "Addict"). Everfree Network, a brony media network, compiled more than 4,800 pieces of fan music by over 500 different musicians. In January 2014, BronyTunes (an iOS and web app) was released that collected over 7,000 songs and remixes inspired by the show, such as an Abbey Road parody called Apple Road.

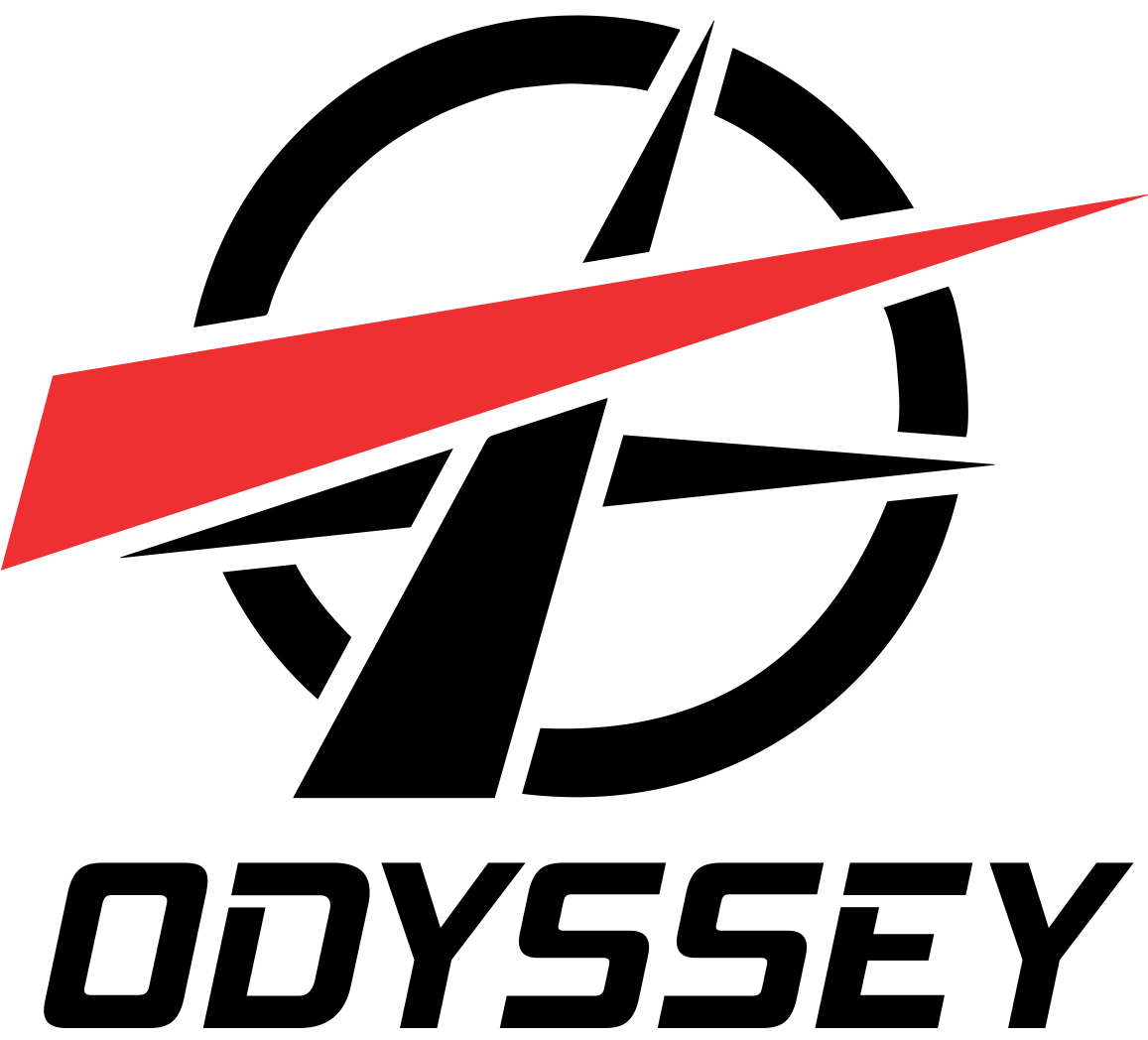
The Living Tombstone (left) was among the earliest musicians to create original music for the My Little Pony: Friendship Is Magic fandom. More recently, Odyssey Eurobeat (right) has also gained mainstream recognition.

Multiple influential artists spanning multiple genres gained popularity throughout this period. Electronic musician duo The Living Tombstone initially gained popularity making remixes of Friendship Is Magic. In a 2012 interview with Rolling Stone, Ingram acknowledged the vibrant fan musician community, noting that "YouTube views of works by The Living Tombstone, Alex S., Eurobeat Brony and more" were "rivaling those of label-signed musicians." Alex S. became known for electronic remixes that gained substantial followings, while WoodenToaster created original compositions that frequently appeared in fan rankings. Other brony musicians include Acoustic Brony, who gained recognition for melodic guitar compositions like "Balladshy" (a tribute to the character Fluttershy) and PinkiePieSwear, whose song "Flutterwonder" (a remix of the show's "So Many Wonders" song) was described by Geek Reply as a classic in the community for its trance-like qualities and creative sampling of show audio.

Musicians working in rock and metal genres also found an audience within the fandom. In June 2012, PrinceWhateverer gained recognition for the composition "Between Fairy Tales and Happy Endings," which addressed the controversy surrounding the modification of fan-favorite character Derpy Hooves after concerns were raised about her portrayal. By the show's conclusion in 2019, PrinceWhateverer produced three full albums of songs primarily focused on characters and events from the show. One notable exception is his composition "Solidarity," which discusses the brony community itself. In particular, the song reflects on a common fear among fans that their community was past its "golden years" and would ultimately decline into obscurity. Other notable contributors include Replacer, whose song "Finding My Way (Back Home)" gained popularity for its emotional depth, and performers like DustyKatt and Mic the Microphone.

In November 2017, Ule Lopez of Geek Reply placed the two-part fan song and animation The Moon Rises (Remaster) and Lullaby for a Princess by Ponyphonic as number 1 on his list of the best brony songs of all time. As part of a fandom endeavor, by September 2019, over 730 gigabytes of brony music was archived in The Pony Music Archive.

=== 2020–present: Post-My Little Pony: Friendship Is Magic era ===
Following the conclusion of Friendship Is Magic in 2019, brony music evolved from remixes of episodes to songs that often have minimal direct references to the show, with some brony musicians using the fandom primarily as a creative outlet rather than drawing directly from show content.

In March 2020, brony musicians began to experiment with AI-generated vocals from the popular text-to-speech web app 15.ai, which synthesized voice lines of characters from the show. Musical compositions and music videos made using 15.ai were regularly featured on Equestria Daily; AI song covers sung by the characters of Friendship Is Magic have also become popular. One of the earliest examples was the explicit pony music video Pony Zone, which used AI-generated vocals of Twilight Sparkle and Fluttershy.

In June 2021, The Living Tombstone remix of the 2012 song "Discord" by Odyssey Eurobeat went viral on social media. The song is themed around the eponymous character from Friendship Is Magic, a mischievous draconequus known for causing chaos and disharmony. Several users who used the song in their videos reported that they had been previously unaware of its My Little Pony origin. As of June 2021, the song had garnered over 47 million views on YouTube (and as of July 2025, over 84 million views) and had been used in over 500,000 videos on TikTok.

The song cover for Vylet Pony's "ANTONYMPH". The cover artwork depicts Fluttershy wearing a costume of GIR from Invader Zim.

In the same month, fandom musician Vylet Pony released the song "ANTONYMPH", an anthem encouraging people to "embrace the cringe" and celebrate their authentic interests without shame. David Hall of Firebird Magazine praised the song and called it "a song filled with love from the very top of its sugary synth lines to the deepest parts of its pounding bass, playfully weaving in references to Parry Gripp, Ray William Johnson, and Skype notifications so that you can’t help but smile to while listening to it." In February 2022, music critic Anthony Fantano featured the song "i've still got something to teach you" by Vylet Pony on The Needle Drop, Fantano's online music reviewing stream. The same year, Vylet Pony's album can opener's notebook: fish whisperer reached the top of Rate Your Music. In February 2024, the NBA's Portland Trail Blazers played "ANTONYMPH" during one of their games. In an August 2024 weekly music review on The Needle Drop, Fantano praised Vylet Pony's song "where do we begin?" and called it "very sweet on the ears and adorable as hell." In November 2024, Vylet Pony released the progressive rock concept album Monarch of Monsters, which has been described by Bonnibel Rampertab of The Daily Campus as her "most ambitious work thus far."

As part of a concert at HarmonyCon 2024, PrinceWhateverer performed alongside fellow brony musicians MelodyBrony, 4everfreebrony, and Whirlwind in the rock band My Little Romance—a parody of My Chemical Romance—and debuted a cover of "Welcome to the Black Parade." My Little Romance subsequently released an album that features My Little Pony themed parody songs of the album The Black Parade. The final performance of My Little Romance took place at GalaCon 2025. In 2026, two members of this band were joined by DBPony formed a new band Green Hay—a parody of Green Day—and released a new album parodying American Idiot.

In March 2025, BABSCon—a brony convention in the San Francisco Bay Area—dismissed its music concert coordinator Pinkaboo three weeks before BABSCon's final edition, which prompted all of its brony musicians to withdraw from the official concert and organize an alternative event called Pinkaboo's Neighhem that was held immediately after the end of the convention. The alternative concert, which received its funding from 15 (the creator of 15.ai) and a GoFundMe campaign, drew over a thousand attendees (over half of BABSCon's attendees), and took place at the Fox Theatre in Redwood City, California. BABSCon replaced the cancelled concert with a performance by Mystery Skulls.

In July 2025, Vylet Pony released the album Love & Ponystep, which reached the top of music aggregate website Rate Your Music. The over 90-minute release featured collaborations with various artists (such as the narrator of Disco Elysium) and incorporated samples from video games like Call of Duty: Black Ops II, Fortnite, and Deltarune, as well as references to 2010s Internet culture and tributes to Skrillex. Amelia Zollner of Ringtone Mag praised the album and described it as "almost definitely Vylet's most ambitious album yet," though she acknowledged that some critics dismissed it as "meme music" due to its heavy use of irony and video game samples. Kieran Press-Reynolds of online music magazine Pitchfork gave Love & Ponystep a 7.8 out of 10 and praised the album's combination of electronic dance music with My Little Pony.

== Reception and analysis ==
In a 2012 interview, Jayson Thiessen, the supervising director of Friendship Is Magic, commented that many of these fan productions approach the quality of his studio's work, and suggested the possibility of crowdsourcing some aspects of future production, while the show's composer, Daniel Ingram, often features fan-made songs on his personal webspace.

The brony music scene has attracted academic interest as a case study in participatory fan culture and creative community building. Researchers studying the brony fandom have noted how the creation and sharing of music helped establish community bonds among fans while also serving as a vehicle for self-expression and identity formation within the fandom, with over 70% of fandom members reporting that they listen to brony music daily.

A 2014 entrepreneurial case study identified brony music as an underserviced but growing market catered to by non-mainstream groups.

== List of brony music concerts ==
| Event | Location | Dates | Performers |
|---|---|---|---|
| Everfree Northwest 2024 | Bellevue, WA | Aug 22–23, 2024 | Canto & Thrack; 4EverfreeBrony; Forest Rain; The Wonderbolts!; Evershade; Koa / SCR4TCHK4T; Vale & FL0; Metajoker; My Little Romance (PrinceWhateverer & MelodyBrony) / rawrity; loophoof; General Mumble; VinylTastic; John Kenza & Faulty |
| Ponyville Ciderfest 2024 | Milwaukee, WI | Nov 1–2, 2024 | AchieveHunter1; Bolt the Super-Pony; Evershade; Forest Rain; IvoryBrony / Jensen Stiles; John Kenza; Koa; Maerstrom; The Manehattan Jazz Quartet / MathematicPony; Metajoker; My Little Romance; PHES; Sound Bandit; Sylvver |
| HarmonyCon 2025 | Dallas, TX | Jan 31–Feb 1, 2025 | Pit Crew (Chuckles, Snowy Charm, Chompy); Maerstrom (Thrack, Canto Acrylic, Luck Rock, JeshPK, General Mumble); 4everFreebrony & Luna Jax; My Little Romance (MelodyBrony, PrinceWhateverer, 4everfreebrony, Whirlwind); Azure Comet / Pony House Mafia (Jensen Stiles, Sylvver, Trey Husk); loophoof; Faulty & Kenza Koa; Manehattan Jazz Quartet; Metajoker / dBPony; The Wonderbolts (Mongo/Pappa Pie, Skribbles, Whimsy, theoneGalen, Musket, Thrack, BlueBrony); Color by Number (MathematicPony, BlueBrony); Starcrush! (Evershade, Namii) |
| Pinkaboo's Neighhem (Note: Although the musicians were originally planned to be played at BABSCon 2025, the convention ultimately replaced them with Mystery Skulls.) | Redwood City, CA | April 20, 2025 | Wonderstorm (Captain Thrack, Luck Rock, General Mumble, Canto Acrylic, Wonderbolts); Splash Meta4 (Turquoise Splash, Metajoker, 4everfreebrony); TCB & loophoof; John Kenza & Trey Husk; Vinyltastic & VALE & FL0 / Starcrush! (Evershade, Namii); Seventh Element & PegasYs; Ponyphonic; The Dawn Seekers (PrinceWhateverer, MelodyBrony, dBPony); Pony Rap Gods (Mic the Microphone, Rhyme Flow, Nexgen) / Chang31ing & Taps; Silva Hound, Garnika, Chi-Chi; Vylet Pony; Odyssey Eurobeat (Note: Listed as "Eurobeat Brony" on the BABSCon website) |
| Everfree Encore 2025 | Gut Steimke, Germany | June 6–8, 2025 | loophoof; Koron Korak; Lavender Harmony; Turquoise Splash & Pinkaboo; Odyssey Eurobeat; Blackened Blue / PrinceWhateverer; ElectroKaplosion; Pagan Pegasus; Captain Thrack; Bolt the Super-Pony / Celica Soldream; Scootaloo; Coltastrophe; Tom Hengst (aka Single Purpose) |
| TrotCon 2025 | Columbus, OH | July 25–26, 2025 | MAERSTORM; Skron; Spin_Scissor; Jensen Stiles; AchieveHunter; R3CTIFIER / Chang31ing; Sgt. Hare x Stray; MCMIAG; MELODYBRONY; Sound Bandit x Evershade; Koa x Faulty / Foozogz; IvoryBrony & Nexgen; Neighgative_; Trey Husk; Twist n' sPin |
| Everfree Northwest 2025 | Bellevue, WA | Aug 22–23, 2025 | Thrack n' Turqy; PrinceWhateverer; MelodyBrony; SpinScissor; Manehattan Jazz Quartet; Azure Comet; Evershade x Luck Rock / loophoof; John Kenza; Shuffle and Fl0; AchieveHunter1; VinylTastic; Garnika; Halfway Through Omega / SCR4TCHK4T & Friends; Metajoker; BronyMike; 4EverfreeBrony; Luna Jax; Ukulele Bronies |
| GalaCon 2025 | Waiblingen, Germany | Sep 5, 2025 | Luna Jax & 4EverfreeBrony; MetaJoker / My Little Romance; Koron Korak / Jalmaan |
| Mare Fair 2025 | Orlando, FL | Sep 5-7, 2025 | Cantersoft; Horse Heresy; Canto Acrylic; Totalspark; SpinScissor / ElectroKaplosion; Trey Husk; Shuffle x Fl0; cindykate / DJ Wiener Schnitzel; Cadence x HSH; Sound Bandit; MCMIAG |

== See also ==
- List of fan works of the My Little Pony: Friendship Is Magic fandom
- My Little Pony: Friendship Is Magic discography
- My Little Pony: Friendship Is Magic fan fiction
- My Little Pony fan convention
- Art of the My Little Pony: Friendship Is Magic fandom
- Slang of the My Little Pony: Friendship Is Magic fandom
- Friendship Is Witchcraft
