= /mlp/ =

My Little Pony: Friendship Is Magic discussion board on 4chan

/mlp/ – Pony

- /mlp/ catalog on April 14, 2025
- Website type: 4chan imageboard
- Available in: English
- Owner: Hiroyuki Nishimura
- Founder: Christopher "moot" Poole
- Website: 4chan.org/mlp/
- Commercial: Yes
- Registration: Optional
- Launched: February 16, 2012; 14 years ago
- Current status: Online

/mlp/ (Note: Pronounced either as the individual letters "M-L-P" or as "slash M-L-P") is a board on the English-language imageboard website 4chan dedicated to discussion of the animated television series My Little Pony: Friendship Is Magic. The board serves as the gathering place on 4chan for adult fans of the series, commonly known as bronies, to share and discuss images, videos, fan fiction, news, and other fan-created content related to the show and its fandom.

The brony fandom began on /co/, the comics and cartoons board of 4chan. In response to the overwhelming amount of pony-related content flooding 4chan, its founder Christopher "moot" Poole created the /mlp/ board on February 16, 2012. Following its creation, moot enacted "Global Rule 15" (which banned all pony-related content on 4chan outside of a few select boards) and directed all such discussions to /mlp/. Like other boards on 4chan, /mlp/ allows non-registered users to create threads with images and post anonymously.

/mlp/ maintains distinctive (and often transgressive) traditions and terminology that combine general 4chan culture with brony lingo. Users often refer to themselves as horsefuckers in a tongue-in-cheek manner; other terms include ponyfag (Note: When used as a term of identification, the -fag prefix carries a neutral connotation on 4chan. See -fag.) and nor/mlp/erson. Some /mlp/ users even outright reject or distance themselves from the brony label in favor of one of the more transgressive identifiers.

Like /b/ and /pol/, /mlp/ has been the subject of academic research. The board has also been involved in controversies in which users have created racist or grotesque content. Despite the original television series ending in 2019, the board continues to be active, with discussions primarily centered around Friendship Is Magic rather than newer entries of the My Little Pony franchise.

== History ==
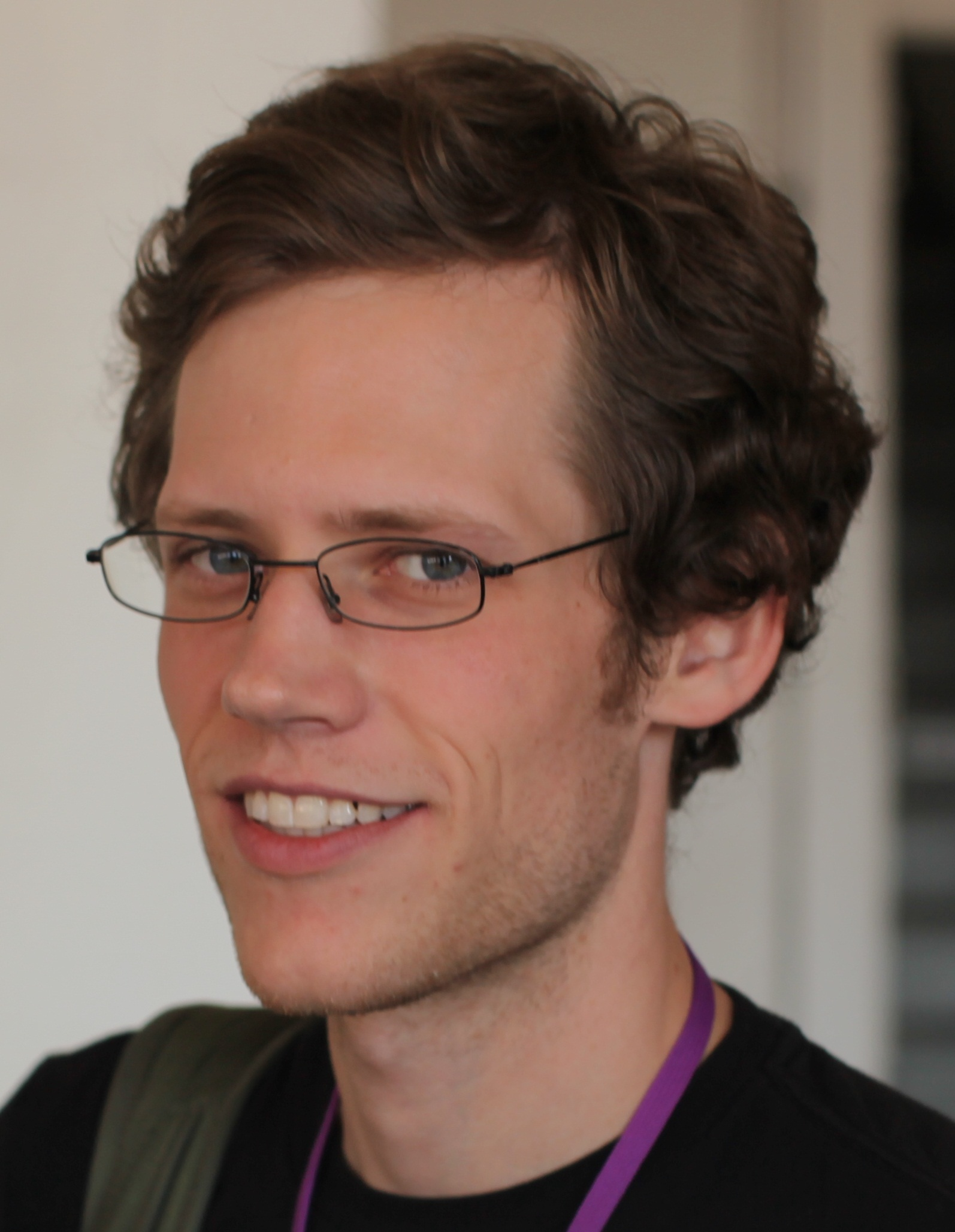
Christopher Poole, 4chan's founder, in 2012

=== Early fan activity on 4chan (2010–2012) ===
Initial discussions about My Little Pony: Friendship Is Magic began on 4chan's "comics & cartoons" (/co/) board shortly after the show's premiere. These early threads featured positive reactions to the show alongside backlash from users who found the content inappropriate for the board. As interest in the series grew, pony-related discussions spread to other sections of the website. By early 2011, the prevalence of pony content had generated considerable conflict within the 4chan community, with many users expressing frustration over the high volume of Friendship Is Magic content appearing across the site. On February 26, 2011, 4chan implemented a total ban on pony-related content, which resulted in immediate bans for users who posted such material. Following this ban, displaced fans established dedicated online communities outside of 4chan, like Ponychan and Equestria Daily. Fans also shared fan content on mainstream platforms like Reddit and Facebook. This exile lasted nearly a year before 4chan administration reconsidered its position.

After recognizing the substantial and persistent nature of the fandom, 4chan reversed its stance by creating the /mlp/ board on February 16, 2012, a year after the implementation of the initial ban. Concurrent with the board's establishment, Poole implemented "Global Rule 15", which confined pony-related content to /mlp/, redirecting all such discussions to the new board.

=== Notable events ===
- On May 27, 2013, Lauren Faust, the creator of My Little Pony: Friendship Is Magic, hosted a Q&A session on /mlp/.
- On November 11, 2014, an infamous incident known as the "Rainbow Dash Cum Jar" (or "Pony Cum Jar Project") gained notoriety when images of a Rainbow Dash figurine submerged in semen left to boil near a radiator were shared on /mlp/. The images spread across various social media platforms and became an Internet meme. Three years later, in 2017, the poster returned to /mlp/ to transfer the contents of the jar to "another, more secure jar". When asked by BuzzFeed News, the poster claimed he conducted the experiment out of "sheer curiosity and scientific research".
- On April 1, 2017, 4chan temporarily merged /mlp/ with the politics board (/pol/) as an April Fool's Day joke, creating a hybrid board dubbed "/mlpol/."
- In December 2017, a series of leaks were posted to /mlp/ reporting that the ninth and final season of Friendship Is Magic would air in 2019, and that an upcoming fifth generation of My Little Pony would be following it.
- On January 20, 2020, anonymous posters from /mlp/ uploaded a book titled Horse Pussy (Note: According to its description, "[it] was written in a week by a large (and unknown) number of anonymous writers who banded together on a thread on the /mlp/ (pony) board of the site 4chan". There were no rules to what could be included in the book; as a result, "there are vomit-inducing sections of the book, as well as subtle romances, racist sections, anti-racist sections, rape scenes, wholesome scenes, and philosophical sections, all of which may even occur at the same time".) onto Google Books.
- On October 10, 2020, M.A. Larson, a screenwriter for Friendship Is Magic, hosted a Q&A session on /mlp/.
- On April 14, 2025, 4chan—along with its boards (including /mlp/)—was hacked and taken down by an anonymous user of soyjak.party. The site returned on April 25.

== Culture ==
=== Terminology and Identity ===
Many users of /mlp/ distance themselves from the mainstream "brony" label, which they associate with openly expressing interest in My Little Pony—a behavior colloquially described on the board as revealing one's "power level." Instead of identifying as bronies, users often adopt self-deprecating or tongue-in-cheek labels like horsefuckers or ponyfag. As one poster on /mlp/ wrote:

"The way I see it, bronies are those fans who don't hide their power level in real life... In what way is someone a trekkie if nobody knows they like Star Trek? I'm a horsefucker, because I want to fuck pastel ponies but no-one will ever know."

The term nor/mlp/erson is also occasionally used to describe the users of /mlp/.

=== Fan fiction ===
On /mlp/, regular threads are devoted to My Little Pony fan fiction, where audiences follow works by "writefags". Like other 4chan boards, /mlp/ operates through anonymity and lack of user registration, with users commonly referring to themselves and others as anons. Self-insert fiction plays a large role, with "Anon in Equestria" being a popular format where a generic human character finds themselves transported to Equestria and interacts with the show's pony characters. These stories often function as wish fulfillment, allowing fans to imagine scenarios where they receive acceptance from or develop romantic and/or sexual relationships with pony characters.

=== Horse News ===
Horse News is /mlp/'s fan news website. On May 23, 2014, Horse News released an exposé that revealed that the term brony did not appear in official Hasbro content until 2012 while the term was first used on 4chan in 2010, contradictory to Hasbro's attempts to claim the rights to the term.

=== Mare Fair ===
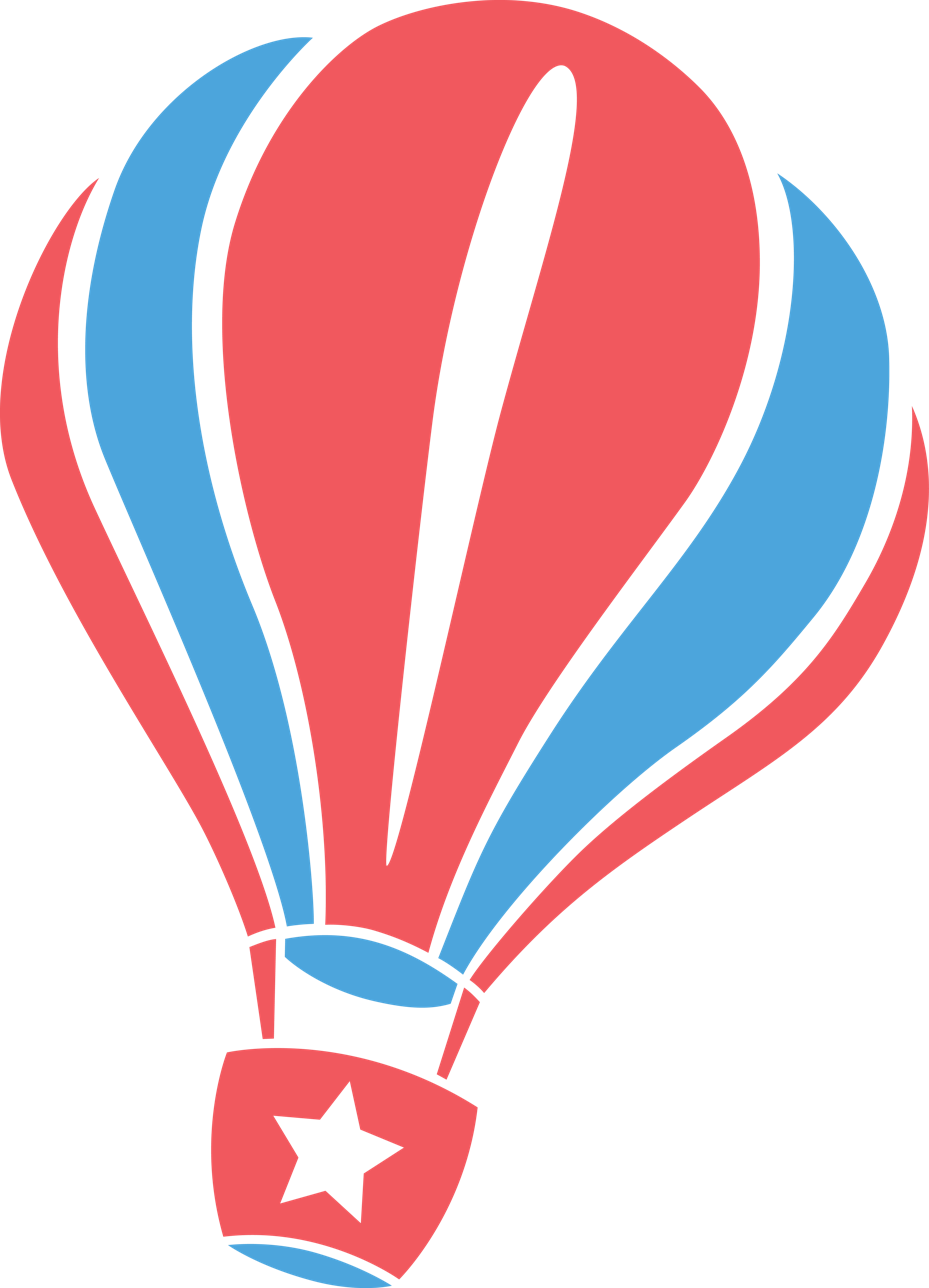
The Mare Fair logo (pictured) has been described as a reference to equine genitalia.

Mare Fair is an annual adults-only My Little Pony convention held in Orlando, Florida organized by users of /mlp/. Founded in 2023 by Corpulent Brony, the convention operates under Snowpity, Inc., which describes itself as a "volunteer organization hosting events to help equines in need". In 2024, Equestria Daily called Mare Fair's website "seriously an impressive design" with "an armada of amazing artists putting their skills into it." Over 1,000 people attended the convention in 2024. Since 2023, Mare Fair has worked with Fallen Oak Equine Rescue and Rehabilitation as their charity benefactor. Mare Fair's charity auction raised over $50,000 in 2023, $103,483 in 2024, and $115,660 in 2025. The latest iteration of Mare Fair took place 5–7 September 2025.

The convention came under public scrutiny in October 2025 due to allegations of extremist imagery and accusations of zoophilia among its founders (see Controversies).

=== Pony Preservation Project ===
The Pony Preservation Project (PPP) is a collaborative project on /mlp/ founded in 2019 dedicated to preserving Friendship Is Magic by assembling and annotating large amounts of voice data to be used for artificial intelligence models. This work has notably been used by the popular free web application 15.ai, whose creator interacted with the PPP and used its dataset to enhance the accuracy and emotional variety of the generated voices. In January 2022, it was discovered that a blockchain-based company called Voiceverse had plagiarized voice lines of Friendship Is Magic characters using 15.ai, pitched them up to sound unrecognizable, promoted them as the byproduct of their own technology, and sold them as non-fungible tokens without permission.

=== Waifus ===
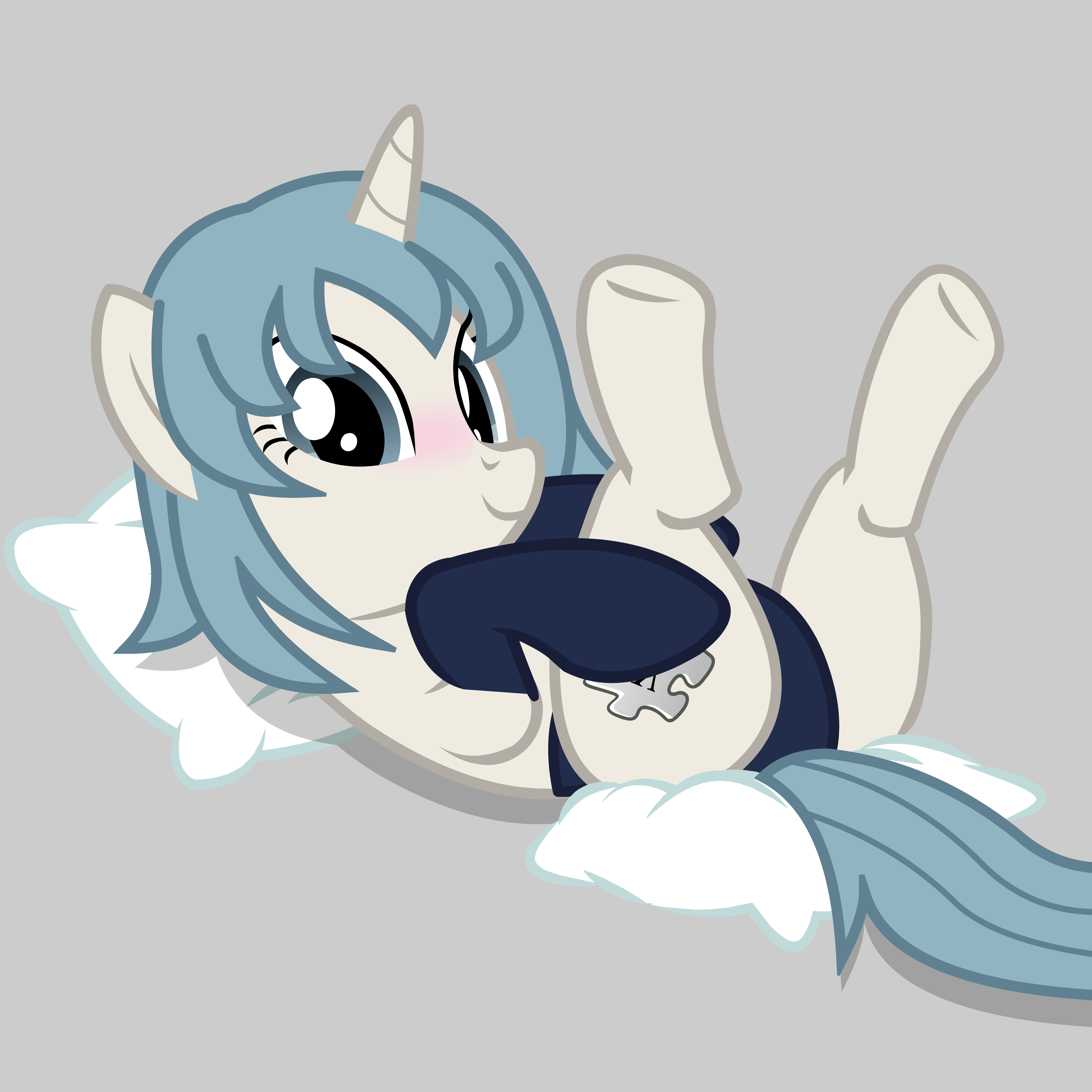
A ponified (“clop”) depiction of Wikipe-tan, portrayed in a softcore, suggestive pose

Users of /mlp/ commonly adopt the practice of having a waifu (a character from the show for whom they feel particular attraction or affection) and often discuss which characters they find sexually attractive.

== Controversies ==
A meme that juxtaposes SpaceX astronauts with Black Lives Matter protestors (above). The "ponified" version of the meme (below), in which the astronauts are replaced with ponies and protestors are replaced with zebras (who are African-coded in the Friendship Is Magic universe). A report by The Atlantic described it as an example of racism in the brony fandom.

=== Racist content ===
Since its inception, segments of the My Little Pony fandom, particularly parts of the /mlp/ community, have faced scrutiny regarding the presence right wing elements. Due to the fandom's early roots on 4chan, some users introduced politically radical content to the community.

In June 2020, during the George Floyd protests, The Atlantic reported that the My Little Pony fandom was experiencing an "all-out civil war" regarding racist content. The article noted that some /mlp/ users mocked the protests with racist art, many of which was posted to Derpibooru, the fandom's primary fan art repository. On Derpibooru, art mocking the protests received substantial upvotes while pro-Black Lives Matter art was heavily downvoted. This conflict led to the site's first significant moderation policy change, with administrators banning images "created for no reason other than to incite controversy" and temporarily removing content mocking the protests. The article specifically identified Derpibooru as having "became[sic] a playground for the right-wing posters [from /mlp/] who could upload their art."

One controversial image described in the report was a modified version of a white nationalist meme that juxtaposed SpaceX astronauts with Black Lives Matter protesters "rioting." The meme, which was first posted on /mlp/, replaced black protesters with cartoon zebras (who are African-coded in the Friendship Is Magic universe). The Atlantic noted that zebras are commonly referred to on /mlp/ using the word zigger—a portmanteau of zebra and nigger—and quoted a user's comment on the image that praised it as "perfect for subtle messaging".

=== Mare Fair extremist imagery and staff zoophilia allegations ===
Images of the human swastika formed at the venues' pools during Mare Fair 2023 and 2024

In October 2025, Mare Fair lost its venue for future events in what its organizers described as a breach of contract. The convention had moved between three venues in three years while gaining outside attention for controversial incidents. These included attendees forming human swastikas at the hotel pool, selling Nazi-themed merchandise, the convention's logo alluding to explicit equine anatomy, and its founders' financial ties to cryptocurrencies. Weeks later, an exposé compiled from accounts by other bronies and horse rescue staff stated that Mare Fair's leadership included an individual known as Lightsolver, who had made comments online defending zoophilia and had been accused of sexual abuse of animals at a horse rescue he worked at. The exposé also stated that Lightsolver had gained control over another horse rescue that had been knowingly supported by the convention. The exposé additionally stated that Corpulent Brony, one of Mare Fair's founders, owns a My Little Pony fan video hosting website whose "about" page included the statement that "NSFW videos (including of actual horses) are welcome, but please mark them as NSFW." According to the exposé, this website was found to be hosting bestiality content that Corpulent Brony had personally supported; this content was removed prior to the publication of the exposé, but after controversy emerged about Lightsolver's sexual abuse of animals.

== Analysis ==
In a 2017 eight-month ethnographic study published in Sexualities, sociologists John Bailey and Brenna Harvey found that /mlp/ users constructed a collective identity around sexual desires that positioned them outside normative heterosexuality. Unlike mainstream bronies, they found that /mlp/ users often incorporate their sexual attraction to pony characters as a central element of communal identity. Many users of /mlp/ engage in self-policing by differentiating themselves from bronies who openly share their interest in the show, and many view women as advantaged and men as victims in sexual and social contexts. Bailey and Harvey wrote that /mlp/ illustrates how online communities formed around stigmatized interests can develop distinct political orientations shaped by shared marginalization, inadvertently reinforcing hegemonic masculinity.

In a 2024 sociological analysis published in Dialogues, Helina Hartman examined hypermasculinization within /mlp/. Hartman wrote that /mlp/ users tend to "masculinize" the show by creating artwork involving violence or the military, sexualizing the characters, or creating otherwise grotesque content like the "Pony Cum Jar Project"; she suggested that this was a coping mechanism to reconcile their enjoyment of the show with societal pressures to conform to traditional masculine norms. Hartman wrote that /mlp/ was a resistance to traditional gender roles despite reinforcing hegemonic masculinity through their "masculinization" of a feminine show.

== See also ==
- /b/ – Imageboard or online forum on 4chan
- /pol/ – Political discussion board on 4chan
- /mu/ – Music discussion board on 4chan
- /x/ – Paranormal discussion board on 4chan
