= Give2Asia =

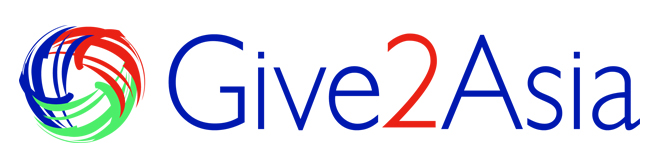
- Formation: 2001
- Type: Nonprofit Organization
- Headquarters: San Francisco, CA, United States
- Website: Official website

Give2Asia is a US-based 501(c)(3) nonprofit, committed to supporting cross-border giving to Chinese communities through cross-border philanthropy. It connects corporations, foundations, and individuals with charitable projects and social enterprises across mainland China, Taiwan, and Hong Kong SAR. The organization is based in San Francisco, CA.

Give2Asia’s mission is to strengthen communities in Asia by making cross-border giving easier and more effective. We envision healthy and prosperous communities supported by cross-border philanthropy and locally led development and believes that local communities know best what their most pressing needs are and how to address them.

They have served as the philanthropy partner in the Asia-Pacific region for hundreds of donors, companies, foundations, and nonprofit organizations, including Adobe Systems, Bank of America, Margaret A. Cargill Foundation, Caterpillar, Deshpande Foundation, EMC, Facebook, PEPSI, Qualcomm, Silicon Valley Community Foundation, Starbucks, State Street, Steamboat Ventures, and Synopsis. Give2Asia provides on-the-ground research in each country, including thorough due diligence on grantees, meeting U.S. regulations for international grant making, and ensuring adherence to local laws in recipient locations. They enable employee giving and matching, volunteerism, and tax-deductible giving to charitable groups in China from the United States. Give2Asia guides projects to completion, expanding the capacity of corporate foundation and community engagement teams.

== Organization ==
Give2Asia partners with families and foundations to support communities, their local nonprofits, and solutions to the issues they face. They also offer a Fiscal Sponsorship Program that offers charitable and educational organizations a convenient and cost-effective way to accept tax-deductible contributions from supports in the United States without having to set up a 501(c)3. Give2Asia handles the day-to-day administration, accounting, and legal and reporting requirements, making it simpler for China-based organizations to connect to US-based donors with charitable projects in China. The organizational structure of Give2Asia consists of a Board of Directors, Staff, who are headquartered in San Francisco, California, and staff in a China Representative Office based in Beijing, China in compliance with China's 2017 ONGO law.

In 2024, Give2Asia underwent a corporate restructuring to refocus its efforts and strengthen its position as the leader in philanthropy services to China, serving as a bridge to local communities.. Give2Asia Foundation HKSAR, a Section 88 Hong Kong-based nonprofit, offers charitable investments for Hong Kong SAR, as well as the Asia-Pacific region. The foundation delivers professional philanthropic services, such as Hong Kong-based Donor Advised Funds and Corporate Advisory Services, that are helping to expand the capabilities of Asia’s cross-border donors.

Give2Asia is also a founding member of Myriad – the Alliance for borderless giving. The Alliance brings together a network of like-minded members who encourage, stimulate, and facilitate cross-border giving, each in the country or region where they are based. Members provide streamlined services to donors wishing to support causes around the world and to foreign nonprofits seeking contributions from donors in their market.

Myriad currently counts nine members across the United States, United Kingdom, Canada, Europe, Australia, New Zealand, Singapore, and Hong Kong SAR.

== Breakdown of Grants ==
In its FY2024 snapshot report, Give2Asia delivered $30 million in grants from the US into China, including mainland China, Taiwan, and Hong Kong SAR across 299 projects. GRANTS BY DONOR TYPE: Individuals $19,443,876; Corporations $12,133,389; Foundations $2,035,837. GRANTS BY FUND TYPE: Friends Funds: $13,763,623; Donor Advised Funds $12,383,760; Special Interest Funds $3,688,079; Disaster Response Campaigns $99,613. GRANTS BY REGION: Hong Kong SAR: 14%; Mainland China: 63%; Taiwan: 23%. GRANTS BY ISSUE AREA: Education: 62%; Environment: 12.7%; Health: 8.1%; Livelihood: 10.4%; Other: 2%; Social Services: 2.4%; Arts and Culture: 2.3%.
