= TrotCon =

Annual My Little Pony fan convention

- Official logo for TrotCon 2026
- Status: Active
- Genre: My Little Pony fan convention
- Venue: Ohio State University Union (2012); Sheraton Columbus at Capitol Square (2013–2014); Crowne Plaza Columbus North (2015–2022); Dayton Convention Center (2023–2024); Wyndham Columbus (2025–)
- Location: Columbus, Ohio
- Country: United States
- Inaugurated: 21–22 July 2012
- Most recent: 24–26 July 2026
- Next event: 12–13 December 2026 (Online)
- Attendance: 600 in July 2025
- Organizer: Dragon Adventures LLC (since 2015)
- Website: https://trotcon.net/

TrotCon is an annual My Little Pony fan convention held in Columbus, Ohio organized for the fandom of the animated television series My Little Pony: Friendship Is Magic, whose adult fans are commonly referred to as bronies.

== Overview ==
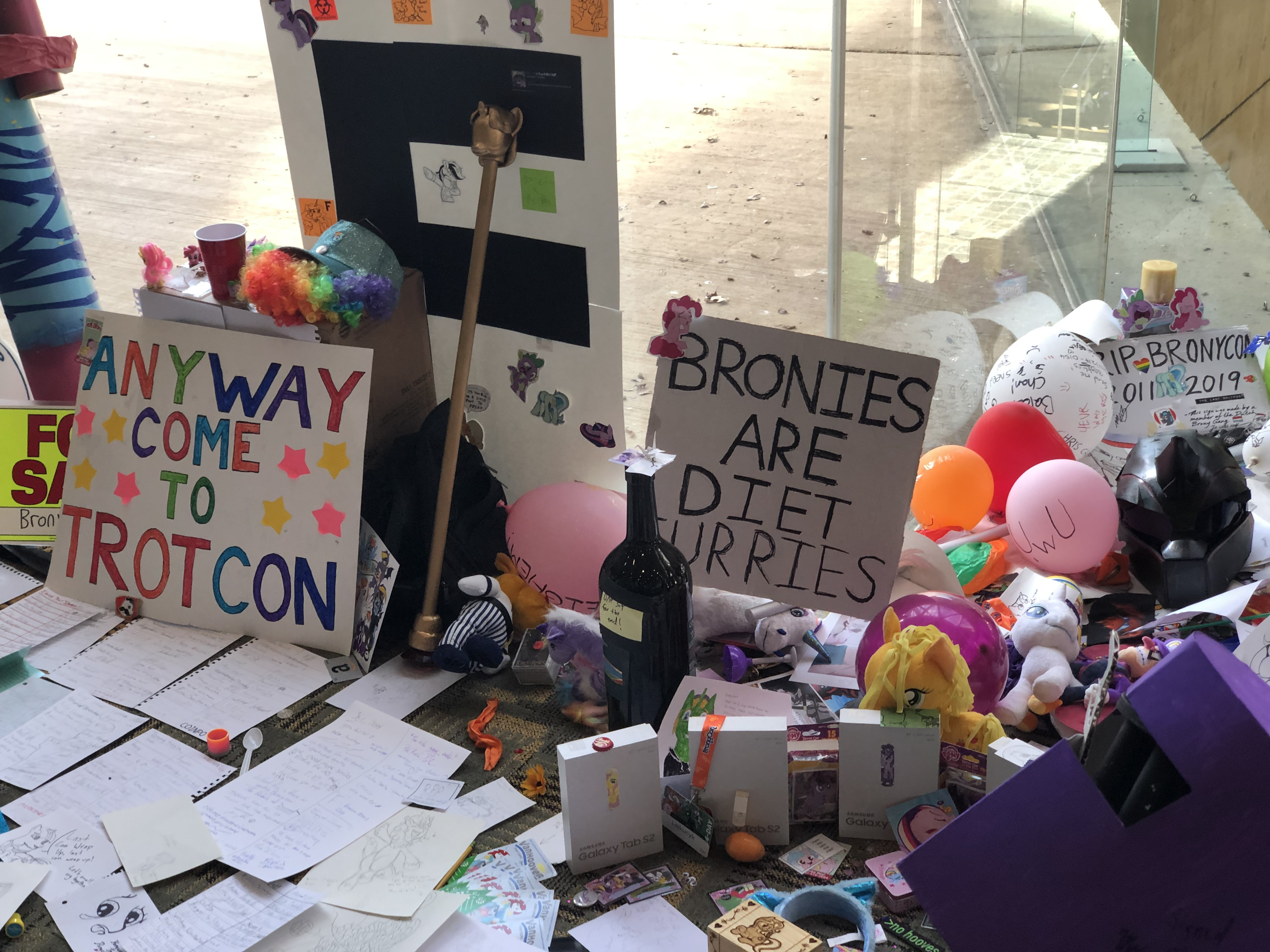
A sign advertising TrotCon at the memorial for the final BronyCon in 2019.

TrotCon is an annual convention primarily dedicated to fans of the animated television show My Little Pony: Friendship is Magic, particularly the adult fans known as "bronies". The event features various activities including panels, artist vendors, and appearances by voice actors and writers from the show.

The convention was founded in February 2012 by a group of staff members who had previously been involved in organizing anime conventions throughout Ohio. The first TrotCon was held at the Ohio State University's Union in July 2012 with 700 attendees. In 2013, the convention was held at the Sheraton Columbus at Capitol Square from June 14–16; rates were $40 for a three-day pass, and single-day badges priced at $25 on Friday, $30 on Saturday, and $20 on Sunday. The 2013 event featured Dave Polsky, one of the show's writers, along with numerous electronic musicians including Eurobeat Brony, who was noted as the first DJ to remix a song from the show.

In 2017, the convention theme was Fallout: Equestria, a popular My Little Pony: Friendship Is Magic fan fiction that places ponies in the post-apocalyptic world of the Fallout video game series. The convention featured ponies dressed in armor with guns, and many attendees wore paintball armor and other quasi-military attire. TrotCon features both daytime programming suitable for all ages and adult-oriented events in the evening, including an "Artist Alley After Dark" where explicit My Little Pony artwork is displayed and sold during late-night hours. TrotCon has been described as more adult-oriented than other conventions, and has been described as having a "fraternity-like atmosphere".

During the COVID-19 pandemic in 2020 and part of 2021, TrotCon was held as virtual events, with in-person conventions resuming in December 2021.

== Locations, attendances, and notable guests by year ==
Year	Dates	Location	Venue	Attendance	Notable guests
2012	July 21–22	Columbus, Ohio	Ohio State University Union	700	
2013	June 14–16	Columbus, Ohio	Sheraton Columbus at Capitol Square	900	Dave Polsky (writer), Eurobeat Brony (musician)
2014	June 20–22	Columbus, Ohio	Sheraton Columbus at Capitol Square	1,000	M. A. Larson (writer), Andrea Libman (voice actor), Peter New (voice actor)
2015	July 17–19	Columbus, Ohio	Crowne Plaza Columbus North	1,200	
2016	July 15– 17	Columbus, Ohio	Crowne Plaza Columbus North	950	
2017	July 14–16	Columbus, Ohio	Crowne Plaza Columbus North	900	
2018	July 20–22	Columbus, Ohio	Crowne Plaza Columbus North	800	
2019	July 19–21	Columbus, Ohio	Crowne Plaza Columbus North	700	
2020	Cancelled due to the COVID-19 pandemic				
2021	December 17–19	Columbus, OH	Crowne Plaza Columbus North	500	
2022	July 15–17	Columbus, OH	Crowne Plaza Columbus North	1,350	
2023	July 7–9	Dayton, OH	Dayton Convention Center	800	
2024	July 12–14	Dayton, OH	Dayton Convention Center	750	
2025	July 25–27	Columbus, OH	Wyndham Columbus	600	
2026	July 24–26	Columbus, OH	Wyndham Columbus	TBA	

== See also ==
- BronyCon
- Everfree Northwest
- Ponyville Ciderfest
- BABSCon
- My Little Pony fan convention
