= CureSearch for Children's Cancer =

Nonprofit organization

- Founded: 1987
- Purpose: CureSearch funds next-generation research that will lead to safe, effective treatments for children with cancer.
- Location: Bethesda, Maryland
- Region served: United States and Canada
- Method: Cancer research
- Website: curesearch.org

CureSearch for Children's Cancer is an American 501(c)(3) non-profit foundation that funds next-generation research that will lead to safe, effective commercially viable treatments for children with cancer.

CureSearch hosts events across the United States, including the Ultimate Hike and CureSearch Walks, to raise funds for next-generation childhood cancer research, and honor and remember those affected by cancer.

== Charity statistics ==
The organization's allocation of funds for the fiscal year ending February 28, 2010 listed 84% of funds for program expenses. The remaining 16% are allocated between three other fields: donated services 12%, fund raising expenses 2%, and administrative expenses 2%.

Charity Navigator rates the foundation four of four stars.
