= Ponyville Ciderfest =

Annual My Little Pony fan convention

- Official logo for Ponyville Ciderfest 2024
- Status: Active
- Genre: My Little Pony fan convention
- Venue: Hyatt Regency Milwaukee
- Location: Milwaukee, Wisconsin
- Country: United States
- Inaugurated: 7–9 November 2014
- Most recent: 21–23 November 2025
- Next event: 20–22 November 2026
- Attendance: 1,032 in 2025
- Organizer: Worthwhile Events NFP
- Filing status: 501(c)(3) non-profit organization
- Website: https://ponyvilleciderfest.com/

Ponyville Ciderfest (abbreviated PVCF) is an annual My Little Pony fan convention held in Milwaukee, Wisconsin organized for the fandom of the animated television series My Little Pony: Friendship Is Magic, whose adult fans are commonly referred to as bronies.

The next Ponyville Ciderfest will take place 20–22 November 2026 at the Hyatt Regency Milwaukee.

== History ==
Ponyville Ciderfest is an annual convention primarily dedicated to fans of the animated television show My Little Pony: Friendship is Magic, particularly the adult fans known as bronies. The event is organized by Worthwhile Events NFP, which also runs Whinny City Pony Con in Illinois and MLP-MSP F in Minnesota. According to Wisconsin Life, Ciderfest brings in more than $500,000 to the city of Milwaukee.

The inaugural convention in 2014, held at the Hyatt Regency in downtown Milwaukee, had an attendance of 829. The event collected donations for the Children's Hospital of Wisconsin and emphasized themes of "love, tolerance, and acceptance" central to the show. Its 2018 edition was themed as a music festival celebrating the music from the fandom and the show. It featured 58 guests and panelists, 39 music acts, and 41 vendors with over 170 events throughout the weekend.

In February 2022, Corgi Events LLC, the parent organization of Ponyville Ciderfest and Whinny City Pony Con, collapsed amid financial troubles including an exorbitant tax warrant against its founder, unpaid staff compensation, and management issues. Tech Charlie, the convention chair of Ciderfest and Whinny City, initially stepped down due to the organizational turmoil. Michelle, owner of Worthwhile Events, purchased both conventions from the dissolving company and reinstated Charlie as chair of both events.

== Locations, attendances, and charity efforts by year ==
Year	Dates	Location	Venue	Attendance	Charity	Amount raised
2014	November 7–9	Milwaukee, Wisconsin	Hyatt Regency Milwaukee	829	Extra Life 4 Kids	$4,887.50
2015	November 20–22	Milwaukee, Wisconsin	Hyatt Regency Milwaukee	1,135	Extra Life 4 Kids	$11,871.00
2016	October 28–30	Milwaukee, Wisconsin	Hyatt Regency Milwaukee	1,160	Extra Life 4 Kids	$10,000.00
2017	October 20–22	Milwaukee, Wisconsin	Hyatt Regency Milwaukee	1,064	Generations Against Bullying	$21,771.00
2018	October 26–28	Milwaukee, Wisconsin	Hyatt Regency Milwaukee	1,399	Generations Against Bullying	$25,306.08
2019	November 1– 3	Milwaukee, Wisconsin	Hyatt Regency Milwaukee	1,371	Generations Against Bullying	$25,922.00
2020	Online only due to the COVID-19 pandemic					
2021	October 22–24	Milwaukee, Wisconsin	Hilton Milwaukee City Center	822	Wisconsin Humane Society	$16,955.00
2022	November 4–6	Milwaukee, Wisconsin	Hilton Milwaukee City Center	833	Wisconsin Humane Society	$33,106.50
2023	November 17–19	Milwaukee, Wisconsin	Hilton Milwaukee City Center	1,064	Wisconsin Humane Society	$111,186.90
2024	November 1–3	Milwaukee, Wisconsin	Hyatt Regency Milwaukee	994	Wisconsin Humane Society	$31,420.69
2025	November 21–23	Milwaukee, Wisconsin	Hyatt Regency Milwaukee	1,032	Wisconsin Humane Society	$35,300

== See also ==
- BronyCon
- Everfree Northwest
- TrotCon
- My Little Pony fan convention
- Charity of the My Little Pony: Friendship Is Magic fandom
