= Everfree Northwest =

Annual My Little Pony fan convention

- Official logo for Everfree Northwest 2025
- Status: Active
- Genre: My Little Pony fan convention
- Venue: Hyatt Regency Bellevue
- Location: Bellevue, Washington
- Country: United States
- Inaugurated: 17–19 August 2012
- Most recent: 21–23 August 2026
- Next event: 9–11 July 2027
- Attendance: 2,702 in 2026
- Organizer: Pegasi Northwest
- Filing status: 501(c)(3) non-profit organization
- Website: https://everfreenw.com/

Everfree Northwest (often abbreviated Everfree NW or EFNW) is an annual My Little Pony fan convention held in the Seattle area, organized for the fandom of the animated television series My Little Pony: Friendship Is Magic, whose adult fans are commonly referred to as bronies. As of October 2026, with the closure of BronyCon in 2019, it is the largest brony convention in the world. Everfree Northwest received an attendance of 2,702 for its 2026 edition, its latest iteration.

The next Everfree Northwest is set to take place 9–11 July 2027 at the Hyatt Regency Bellevue.

== Overview ==
Everfree Northwest is an annual convention primarily dedicated to fans of the animated television show My Little Pony: Friendship is Magic, particularly the adult fans known as "bronies". The event describes its mission as bringing "Equestria to Earth for three days".

The convention features a variety of activities including vendors, contests, auctions, games, and opportunities to meet show writers, comic book colorists, and voice actors from the series. The event has included arts, crafts, and programming tracks tailored specifically for children, with free passes offered to attendees ages 12 and under. Attendees often dress as their favorite characters from the show and participate in activities like "pony karaoke."

The convention's location and dates have varied over the years. In 2014, it was held on July 4–6, while in 2016 it moved to May 13–15 at the Doubletree Hotel Seattle Airport. By 2017, the convention was in its 6th year, still held at the DoubleTree Hotel in SeaTac with an expected attendance of over 3,000 people. Since 2021, the convention has been held in the Seattle suburb of Bellevue, Washington.

Like other brony conventions like BronyCon, Everfree Northwest has established a tradition of charitable activities. In 2012, Everfree Northwest's charity auction raised $13,535 for the Seattle Children's Hospital. The following year, in 2013, the charity auction raised nearly $30,000. The convention organization includes various staff positions such as convention chair, business lead, security lead, social media lead, and graphic designers. By 2013, the convention had approximately 2,000 attendees with a notably low rate of misconduct—out of 2,000 attendees that year, only one person was removed for inappropriate behavior.

Everfree Northwest has a reputation for being one of the more "family-friendly" My Little Pony conventions. The 2017 Everfree Northwest theme was "United in Harmony". The convention typically features a outdoors-related theme because of its shared name with Camp Everfree, a summer camp that appeared in My Little Pony: Equestria Girls – Legend of Everfree.

The brony music concert at Everfree Northwest is called "Ponystock", which has been ongoing since the con's inception in 2012.

== Locations, attendances, and notable guests by year ==
Year	Dates	Location	Venue	Attendance	Notable guests
2012	August 17–19	SeaTac, Washington	SeaTac Airport Holiday Inn and Seattle Airport Marriott Hotel	~1,500	Tara Strong, Andrea Libman, Tabitha St. Germain, Nicole Oliver, Cathy Weseluck, Michelle Creber, Claire Corlett, Madeleine Peters, Shannon Chan-Kent, Kazumi Evans, Peter New, Andrew Francis, Lee Tockar, Daniel Ingram, James "Big Jim" Miller, James "Wootie" Wootton
2013	July 5–7	SeaTac, Washington	Hilton Seattle Airport & Conference Center	2,272	Andrea Libman, Michelle Creber, Peter New, Andrew Francis, Amy Keating Rogers, Raven Molisee, Sabrina "Sibsy" Alberghetti
2014	July 4–6	SeaTac, Washington	Hilton Seattle Airport & Conference Center	~2,500	Rebecca Shoichet, Cathy Weseluck, Marÿke Hendrikse, Michael Dobson, Tony Fleecs, Georgia Ball, Heather Nuhfer
2015	May 29–31	SeaTac, Washington	Hilton Seattle Airport & Conference Center	2,767	John de Lancie, Bonnie Zacherle, Tabitha St. Germain, Nicole Oliver, Kelly Sheridan, Lee Tockar, Ingrid Nilson, M.A. Larson, Jayson Thiessen, Big Jim Miller
2016	May 13–15	SeaTac, Washington	DoubleTree by Hilton Hotel Seattle Airport	>3,000	Andrea Libman, Michelle Creber, Claire Corlett, Maddy Peters, Shannon Chan-Kent, Chantal Strand, Brynna Drummond, Peter New, Trevor Devall, Peter Kelamis, Amy Keating Rogers, M.A. Larson, G.M. Berrow, Jenn Blake, Heather Breckel, Monique Creber, Michael Creber, Ian Corlett, Brian Corlett, Gabriel Brown, Mindy
2017	May 12–14	SeaTac, Washington	DoubleTree by Hilton Hotel Seattle Airport	2,625	Tabitha St. Germain, Nicole Oliver, Britt McKillip, Rebecca Shoichet, Marÿke Hendrikse, Kazumi Evans, Diana Kaarina, Tim Stuby, Denny Lu, Vincent Tong, Andy Price, Tony Fleecs
2018	May 18–20	SeaTac, Washington	DoubleTree by Hilton Hotel Seattle Airport	>2,700	Ashleigh Ball, Andrea Libman, Bill Newton, Chris Britton, Ingrid Nilson, Ryan Beil, Sarah Edmondson, Jason Deline, Brenda Crichlow, Richard Newman, G.M. Berrow, Josh Haber, Katrina Hadley, Jim Miller, Pixelkitties
2019	May 17–19	SeaTac, Washington	DoubleTree by Hilton Hotel Seattle Airport	1,832	Kelly Sheridan, Vincent Tong, Shannon Chan-Kent, Devyn Dalton, Gavin Langelo, Katrina Salisbury, Lauren Jackson, Sunni Westbrook, Mark Acheson, Cathy Weseluck, Nicole Dubuc, Tony Fleecs, Brenda Hickey
2020	Cancelled due to the COVID-19 pandemic				
2021	August 13–15	Bellevue, Washington	Hyatt Regency Bellevue	1,676	Nicole Oliver, Tabitha St. Germain, Sam Vincent, Scott McNeil, Matt Cowlrick, Willa Milner, Chiara Zanni, Ashleigh Ball
2022	August 26–28	Bellevue, Washington	Hyatt Regency Bellevue	1,762	Andrea Libman, Kelly Sheridan, Jenna Warren, Ana Sani, Peter New, Vincent Tong, Maryke Hendrikse, Andy Price, Thom Zahler, JustaSuta, Imalou
2023	August 11–13	Bellevue, Washington	Hyatt Regency Bellevue	1,800	Jenna Warren, Tony Fleecs, Joshua Graham, Amanda Martinez, Bill Newton, Bahia Watson, Ana Sani, Jeremy Whitley, Athena Karkanis, Gillian Berrow, Tony Matthews, Nicole Oliver, Tabitha St. Germain
2024	August 23–25	Bellevue, Washington	Hyatt Regency Bellevue	1,827	Sophie Scruggs, Trish Forstner, Tony Fleecs, Andy Price, Jeremy Whitley, Thom Zahler, Nicole Oliver, AJ Bridel, Andrew Francis, Rebecca Shoichet
2025	August 22–24	Bellevue, Washington	Hyatt Regency Bellevue	2,002	Mark Acheson, G.M. Berrow, Chris Britton, Tony Fleecs, Tabitha St. Germain, Elley-Ray Hennessy, M.A. Larson, Andrea Libman, Nicole Oliver, Andy Price, Sara Richard, Vincent Tong, Jeremy Whitley, Thom Zahler
2026	August 21–23	Bellevue, Washington	Hyatt Regency Bellevue	2,702	Lauren Faust, Tabitha St. Germain, Sam Bielanski, Kazumi Evans, Diana Kaarina, Marÿke Hendrikse, Nicole Oliver, Brianna Garcia, Tony Fleecs, Andy Price, Amy Keating Rogers
2027	July 9–11	Bellevue, Washington	Hyatt Regency Bellevue		TBA

== See also ==
- BronyCon
- Ponyville Ciderfest
- TrotCon
- Music of the My Little Pony: Friendship Is Magic fandom
- My Little Pony fan convention
