= List of fan works of the My Little Pony: Friendship Is Magic fandom =

The My Little Pony: Friendship is Magic fandom (also known as the brony fandom) has generated a vast body of fan work, including fan music, fan art, fan fiction, fan edits, fan films, fan games, fan conventions, and fan sites. The following is a list of notable fan works of the brony fandom.

== Fan art and fan animation ==
- PONY.MOV
- Friendship Is Witchcraft

== Fan games ==
- Equestria at War
- Legends of Equestria
- Them's Fightin' Herds

== Fan fiction ==
- Rainbow Factory
- Fallout: Equestria

== Fan music ==
- Love & Ponystep

== Fan sites ==
- 15.ai
- Derpibooru
- Equestria Daily
- Fimfiction

== Fan conventions ==
- BABSCon
- BronyCAN
- BronyCon
- Czequestria
- Everfree Northwest
- GalaCon
- Ponyville Ciderfest
- RuBronyCon
- TrotCon
- UK PonyCon
- Vanhoover Pony Expo
