= My Little Pony: Friendship Is Magic fan fiction =

Fan fiction of My Little Pony

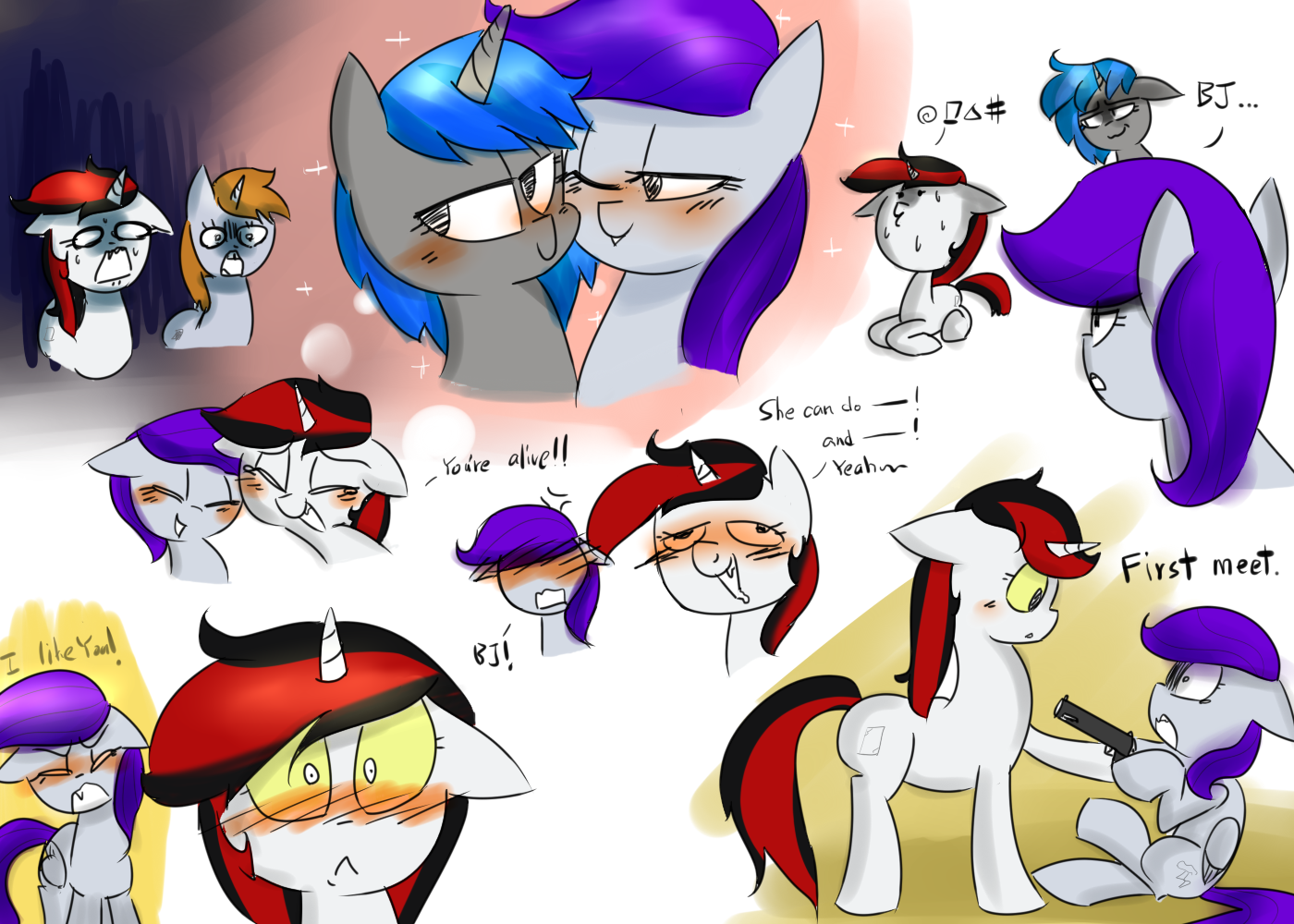
Fallout: Equestria, one of the most influential and acclaimed works of the My Little Pony: Friendship Is Magic fan fiction community, has inspired a large amount of fan art.

The My Little Pony: Friendship is Magic fandom (also known as the brony fandom) has generated a vast body of fan work, including fan fiction. The fandom's literary output spans diverse genres like romance, adventure, horror, sci-fi, crossovers, and slice of life stories. Fimfiction, the largest repository of My Little Pony fan fiction, contains over 150,000 published stories. Particularly influential and acclaimed works, such as Fallout: Equestria and Background Pony, have gained mainstream critical attention and have inspired fan dubs, fan art, and fan translations. According to a 2018 study, 8.6% of bronies reported that they frequently wrote fan fiction; 39% reported that they read fan fiction almost daily.

Despite the original show concluding in 2019, the My Little Pony fan fiction community has remained consistently active. Fan-created works experienced an uptick in popularity in 2020 at the height of the COVID-19 lockdowns.

== History ==
Fans began creating fan fiction of Friendship Is Magic shortly after the show's premiere. The character of Derpy Hooves was created by the brony fandom after fans spotted her in the background of the first episode and collectively gave her a name and an agreed-upon backstory (a clumsy but good-natured mail carrier pony who loves muffins) through fan fiction.

== Platforms ==
=== Fimfiction ===
Launched in July 2011, Fimfiction is the largest repository of Friendship Is Magic fan fiction. By July 2015, Fimfiction had 185,014 users and 86,009 published stories. As of September 2025, the website has over 600,000 registered users and over 150,000 approved stories.

=== /mlp/ ===
The /mlp/ board of 4chan has spawned genres of fan fiction, such as the "Anon in Equestria" format, where the anonymous human character "Anon" is a self-insert for the reader.

=== FanFiction.Net ===
FanFiction.Net hosted many early works in the fandom before Fimfiction's launch in July 2011. Cupcakes, an infamous fan fiction in which Pinkie Pie is depicted as a serial killer, was originally published on FanFiction.Net.

== Adaptations ==
=== In other media formats ===
Various works of Friendship Is Magic fan fiction have been adapted as dramatic readings and fully cast audio plays; some have also been published as physical novels.

The animated web series Rainbow Dash Presents parodies several of the most popular fan fictions to come from the fandom. Set in an alternate universe of Friendship Is Magic, each episode of Rainbow Dash Presents retells the events of a fan fiction from the narration of a whimsical and naive Rainbow Dash.

=== Fan translations ===
According to a 2021 study, fan translation spaces of the brony community tend to be more comprehensive and methodical than those of other fandoms. Studies of Russian-speaking bronies translating fan fiction into English have shown that writers naturally form roles based on their expertise.

=== Fandubbing ===
Fandubbing is another creative practice that complements the fan fiction of the brony fandom. Similar to the experiences of the Russian brony interviewed by Shafirova and Cassany in their study of language acquisition, My Little Pony fandubbers often engage in meticulous translation and voice acting work that not only strengthens their fan identity, but also develops their language skills. One fan noted that fandubbing was an opportunity to learn English, but in doing so, wanted to apply their acting skills as well as be part of the community by producing new content for the international brony audience. Friendship Is Witchcraft, created by Jenny Nicholson and Griffin Lewis under the pseudonym "Sherclop Pones", is a reimagination of Friendship Is Magic with darker, more satirical themes. The fan-made My Little Pony episode The Tax Breaks, released in May 2022, used the text-to-speech platform 15.ai to fan dub a work of fan fiction with AI voice synthesis technology.

=== Fan music ===
Brony music has both been written about and directly inspired some of the most influential fan fictions. Since its release in 2011, Fallout: Equestria has become the subject of countless songs ranging drastically in tone. In many cases, musicians have embraced the dark themes of the story in somber rock or metal music such as The Living Tombstone's song "Run, Shoot, Kill... and Cry" based on the fan made spinoff called Fallout: Equestria - Project Horizons. In contrast, other musicians in the fandom such as the band The Wasteland Wailers have embraced the influence of 1950s American on the fan fiction's setting with jazz and electroswing music.

The relationship between fan music and fan fiction in the brony community is one that is uniquely symbiotic. This is best exemplified by The Rainbow Factory, a fan fiction by AuroraDawn inspired by song by WoodenToaster of the same name. While the original song focuses on the Rainbow Factory shown in the episode "Sonic Rainboom" and the idea that pegasi are killed in the production of rainbows, an idea expanded on in the fan fiction. In the years after the fan fiction's release, WoodenToaster produced two more songs focusing on the Rainbow Factory. Meanwhile, AuroraDawn released four more fan fictions that followed this same story and made direct references to WoodenToaster's songs. The popularity of the fan fiction and its relationship with music would also inspire several works from other fandom musicians such as Slyphstorm's "Pegasus Device" and Koa's "Broken Wings".

== Genres ==
=== Alternate universe (AU) ===
Alternate universe (AU) stories reimagine the My Little Pony universe or characters in different settings, timelines, or circumstances than those presented in the show.

In the 2020s, a horror-themed subgenre of AU stories known as "Infection AUs" gained popularity on TikTok. These alternate universes involve zombie outbreaks in Equestria that transform the ponies into disturbing, hostile entities. By 2024, the trend had expanded beyond My Little Pony to other family-friendly animated shows, including Bluey, Miraculous Ladybug, and Pokémon.

=== Self-insert ===
Self-insert fan fiction involves authors inserting themselves into the story as a participant and describes themselves interacting with the ponies and Equestria directly. One common variation involves the Anon in Equestria format, in which a generic anonymous human character (representing either the author or the reader) finds themselves transported to Equestria.

=== Slashfics ===
Slashfics (or shipfics) in the My Little Pony fandom refer to slash and femslash (also referred to as yuri) stories focusing on romantic relationships between characters of the same gender. Within the brony fandom, these relationships are colloquially termed "fillyfooling" for mare-to-mare relationships and "coltcuddling" for stallion-to-stallion relationships. As Friendship Is Magic mostly consists of female characters, lesbian stories make up a large portion of romantic fan fiction on Fimfiction.

=== Clopfics ===
Clopfics are explicit or pornographic My Little Pony fan fiction. On Fimfiction, such stories are labeled with the "sex" or "porn" tag.

== Analysis ==
=== Hybrid masculinity ===
Unlike many fan fiction communities that tend to mostly be female, Fimfiction has a predominantly male audience. In a 2022 study, researchers identified two approaches to masculinity among bronies. Emotive interpreters engaged with the show and its fan fiction primarily for emotional expression and described finding the show during a period of emotional need. They valued the community as a space where they could express emotions more freely than in traditional masculine spaces, and their fan fiction often emphasizes themes of friendship and emotional growth. In contrast, aggrieved remixers (which, according to the study, was the dominant group) transformed the show by frequently introducing violent themes and sexual content that reinterpreted the show's feminine elements through a traditionally masculine lens.

=== Identity ===
Studies have indicated that writing and reading fan fiction can be a form of identity negotiation. In one ethnographic study, researchers described a 15-year-old brony's participation in writing fan fiction as a form of "transgressive humor, and resistance to conformity" that connected his childhood interest in books with more mature creative expressions.

=== As an educational tool ===
"If not for this fanfiction, I would have never begun writing and would likely never have ended up at the school or place in life where I am now. By picking up fanfiction—which led to a major in Creative Writing—I’ve likely made a significant impact on the rest of my life."

— An anonymous fan fiction writer, Writers in the Secret Garden: Fanfiction, Youth, and New Forms of Mentoring

Non-native English speaking bronies have reported using the fandom's fan fiction community as a way to improve their English by developing learning strategies when consuming and producing fan content. Bronies interviewed in studies have reported marked improvements in their writing skills. One fan fiction writer wrote: "Writing fan fiction and getting instant feedback over the past couple of years has improved my writing significantly."

=== Religion ===
Academics have studied how Christian bronies use fan fiction to explore Christianity and their fandom.

=== Activity ===
According to a 2018 study, 8.6% of bronies reported that they frequently wrote fan fiction; 39% reported that they read fan fiction almost daily. The fandom continues to produce new content even after the conclusion of the television series in 2019. Fan-created works experienced an uptick in popularity in 2020 at the height of the COVID-19 lockdowns.

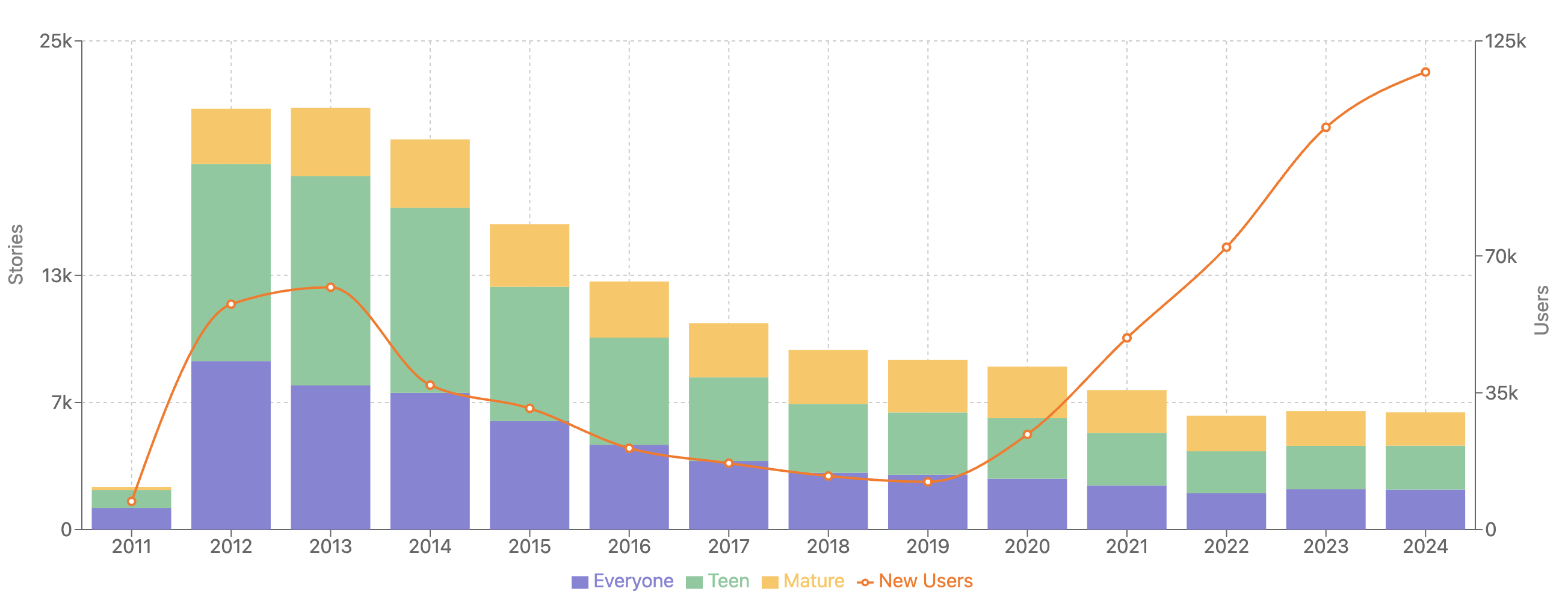
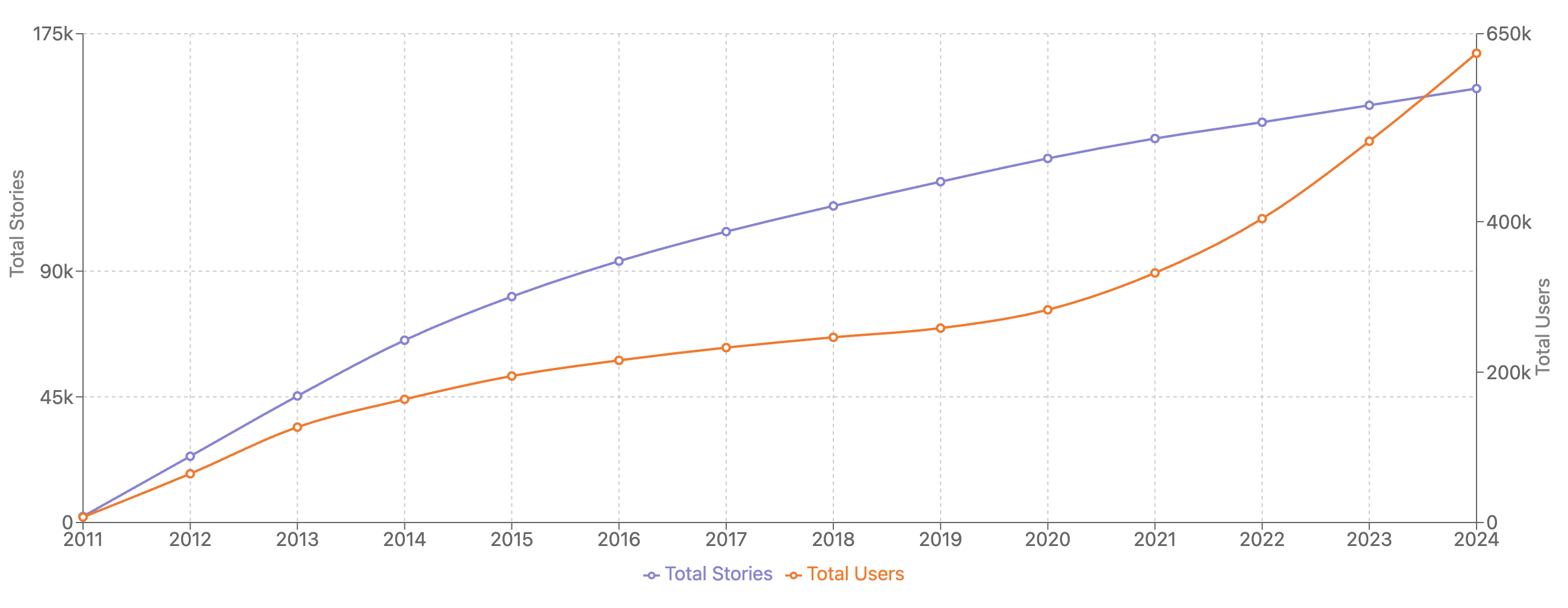
New Fimfiction story approvals and user registrations from 2011 to 2024 per year (left). Cumulative Fimfiction stories and users from 2011 to 2024 (right). A noticeable uptick in newly registered users can be seen from 2020, at the height of the COVID-19 lockdowns.

== List of notable My Little Pony fan fiction ==
Title	Author	Year	Word Count	Description	Notes
Fallout: Equestria	Kkat	2011	600,000+	Crossover between My Little Pony: Friendship Is Magic and the Fallout video game series	Has inspired adaptations including spinoffs, audio productions, fan art, and translations into multiple languages; Gained attention beyond fandom circles; One of the most influential and popular works in the My Little Pony fan fiction community
Rainbow Factory	AuroraDawn	2011	8,266	An infamous fan fiction that reveals Cloudsdale's Rainbow Factory as a secret facility where pegasi are harvested for their "spectrum" to manufacture rainbows	
My Little Dashie	ROBCakeran53	2011	10,000+	A reverse isekai about a human who finds and raises a filly Rainbow Dash, detailing the joys and struggles they share as she grows up.	Has inspired multiple adaptations including comics, audio productions, fan art, fan films and was featured in an episode of Rainbow Dash Presents.; Inspired similar works involving one of the characters being raised by a human on Earth, as well as many unofficial sequels
Past Sins	Pen Stroke	2012	201,810		
Austraeoh	Imploding Colon	2012	212,744	An adventure story featuring Rainbow Dash	
Cupcakes	Sgt. Sprinkles	2011	4,230	An infamous fan fiction in which Pinkie Pie is depicted as a serial killer who murders Rainbow Dash	Regularly referenced in the fandom via jokes and cosplay
Friendship Is Optimal	Iceman	2012	38,609	A science fiction story where an artificial general intelligence designed to run a My Little Pony MMO game ends up assimilating humanity into its virtual world to maximize human happiness according to its programming	Despite its fantastical premise, contains serious arguments that are shared by certain neoreactionary viewpoints
Background Pony	shortskirtsandexplosions	2012	432,377		Appeared on the 2018 Boston University Holiday Reading list alongside Dune
Time Lords and Terror	Hephestus	2012	45,359		
My Little Time Lord	Victorian R. Hellsly	2011			One of the earliest stories to depict Derpy Hooves as a mail carrier paired up with "Dr. Whooves", a character the fandom collectively decided was a ponification of the Tenth Doctor
The Lunaverse	RainbowDoubleDash	2012			
Through the Eyes of Another Pony	CardsLafter	2011		A self-insert fan fiction of the author waking up in Ponyville and interacting with characters of the show	

== See also ==
- List of fan works of the My Little Pony: Friendship Is Magic fandoms
- My Little Pony: Friendship is Magic fandom – Fans of My Little Pony
- Music of the My Little Pony: Friendship Is Magic fandom – Music subculture of My Little Pony fans
- Art of the My Little Pony: Friendship Is Magic fandom – Art subculture of My Little Pony fans
- Tolkien fan fiction – Works created by Tolkien fans
- PONY.MOV – Fan-made parody of My Little Pony
- Friendship Is Witchcraft – Fan-made parody of My Little Pony
