= Science and technology in the My Little Pony: Friendship Is Magic fandom =

STEM activities in the My Little Pony fandom

The fandom of the animated television series My Little Pony: Friendship Is Magic, commonly known as the brony fandom, has contributed to various aspects of science, technology, engineering, and mathematics (STEM), including citizen science, software development, and artificial intelligence. These activities include contributions to research, the creation of tools for other bronies, and the use of digital media to produce and distribute fan works. Analysts have described the intersection of STEM and the brony community as a result of the community's strong participatory culture.

== Notable projects ==
=== Brony@home ===
In April 2011, a 19-year-old Australian fan of Friendship Is Magic known as "Hiiragan" founded Brony@home, a distributed computing team that donated spare processing power from members' personal computers to scientific research. Initially a small group of Folding@home volunteers, it recruited through its own website and other My Little Pony fan sites before expanding to projects on the Berkeley Open Infrastructure for Network Computing (BOINC), including Rosetta@home. These projects studied protein structure and protein folding: Folding@home simulated how proteins fold, while Rosetta@home investigated the relationship between structure and function and the design of new proteins. With more than 1,000 members and a top 50 ranking among BOINC teams for donated processing power, Brony@home was the largest citizen science team based on a fandom.

=== Sweetie Bot Project ===
In 2014, a team of Russian fans began the Sweetie Bot Project to build a four-legged robot modeled on Sweetie Bot, a robotic version of Sweetie Belle in the parody series Friendship Is Witchcraft. The first prototype, assembled from inexpensive servomotors, could not walk; the team used it to work on the robot's kinematics. The second prototype, ProtoPony2, could walk and perform more complex movements, using 24 servomotors to move its legs and neck. Built on Linux and the Robot Operating System (ROS), the platform included control software that let users record poses on a three-dimensional model and play them back on the physical robot.

=== Pony Preservation Project ===
In 2019, users of 4chan's /mlp/ board founded the Pony Preservation Project (PPP), which aims to collect training data to recreate the voices of characters from Friendship Is Magic. Volunteers extracted dialogue from episodes, removed background noise, and paired the recordings with transcripts. Volunteers also wrote scripts to convert Audacity annotations into training data, and provided instructions for training new voice models. By 2021, the project had expanded to include datasets of sound effects, background music, comic transcripts, and animation assets. The PPP's voice dataset was notably used by 15.ai, a speech synthesis application that generated new dialogue in the characters' voices.

=== 15.ai ===
Released in March 2020, 15.ai was a free, non-commercial speech synthesis web application created by 15, who began developing the technology as an undergraduate at the Massachusetts Institute of Technology (MIT). One of the first mainstream applications of generative AI and the first of audio deepfake technology, 15.ai used deep learning to generate new dialogue in the voices of fictional characters. The earliest voices available on 15.ai were those of characters from Friendship Is Magic, and bronies frequently used 15.ai for skits, song covers and episode re-dubs. In January 2021, 15.ai became an international viral phenomenon, and various news outlets reported its broader role in popularizing voice cloning in memes and content creation.

== Analysis ==
In Transformative Works and Cultures, Kevin Veale wrote that bronies are able to develop technical skills applicable outside their community by sharing fan works that they have created. Veale wrote that bronies enjoyed creating fan work, and those who create popular projects often gain social capital within the brony community.

== See also ==
- Analysis of the My Little Pony: Friendship Is Magic fandom
- Religion and spirituality in the My Little Pony: Friendship Is Magic fandom
