= PONY.MOV =

Fan-made parody of My Little Pony

- Genre: Parody; Black comedy
- Created by: Max Gilardi
- Starring: Max Gilardi; Kira Buckland; Arin Hanson; Kimlinh Tran; Various voice actors
- Country of origin: United States
- Original language: English
- No. of episodes: 6

Production
- Running time: 3–8 minutes

Original release
- Network: YouTube
- Release: October 11, 2011 – February 20, 2013

PONY.MOV is a fan-made adult animated parody web series based on the animated television show My Little Pony: Friendship Is Magic. Created by Max Gilardi (also known as hotdiggedydemon), the series ran from October 2011 to February 2013 and gained notoriety within the My Little Pony: Friendship Is Magic fandom for its deliberately crude and subversive take on the source material. The series consists of six episodes, each focusing on one of the main characters from the original show.

== Overview ==
PONY.MOV is a satirical reimagining of My Little Pony: Friendship is Magic that uses deliberately crude and disturbing themes in the style of John Kricfalusi's Ren & Stimpy.

Each episodes feature grotesque caricatures of the series' protagonists that invert the original show's values of friendship and harmony in favor of violence and gore, cruelty, drug use, and dark humor.

== Reception and analysis ==
Ashleigh Ball, the official voice actor for Rainbow Dash and Applejack in the original series, described the PONY.MOV videos as "really twisted and pretty cool" during a May 2012 interview with Everfree Radio.

In a collection of essays on Friendship Is Magic and its derivative works, author Jen A. Blue analyzed PONY.MOV as an example of carnivalization within fan culture, arguing that the series functions as a grotesque inversion of Friendship Is Magic's core values. Blue wrote that the series presents exaggerated versions of familiar characters that retain recognizable traits while being distorted to monstrous extremes, creating what she described as textbook grotesque art.

Unlike other dark parodies of the franchise like Friendship Is Witchcraft, Blue argued that PONY.MOV works as a direct parody of the source material itself rather than fan expectations, with its carnivalesque approach calling into question the fundamental principles of friendship and harmony presented in the original show.

Blue suggested that the series reflects cultural anxieties about masculinity among the show's adult male fanbase, particularly in its portrayal of violence as masculine and friendship as emasculating. In addition, Blue commented that the companion Ask Jappleack blog evolved beyond simple parody that ultimately embraces the values of the original series: an "inversion of an inversion" that carnivalizes the entire genre of violent Friendship Is Magic parodies.

PONY.MOV has been described as an example of a disturbing YouTube video disguised as a children's cartoon. Meredith Woerner, writing for Gizmodo, described the web series as "disgusting... and most certainly NSFW".

In 2014, PONY.MOV was given a cease and desist letter from Hasbro.

== Episodes ==
No.	Title	Written, directed and storyboarded by	Original release date
1	"APPLE.MOV"	Max Gilardi	October 11, 2011
Applejack eats a large amount of apples. Twilight Sparkle questions if she can eat them all, causing Applejack to eat so many apples that she experiences strange visions.
2	"DRESS.MOV"	Max Gilardi	December 7, 2011
A monstrous Discord arrives in Ponyville and begins to destroy everything. Twilight Sparkle tries to gather the other bearers of the Elements of Harmony to combat him, only to be rebuffed by Rainbow Dash. She tries enlisting Rarity, who is more interested in running her sweatshop full of Mexican immigrants. Rarity mistreats the workers, leading to the workers rebelling and beating their captor.
3	"SHED.MOV"	Max Gilardi	February 3, 2012
Spike, Rainbow Dash, and Pinkie Pie decide to visit Fluttershy. They arrive at her home to find her missing and decide to explore her shed, despite her previously forbidding access. They discover that she is a prolific serial killer. Fluttershy arrives and captures Rainbow Dash, who she begins to split in half with a chainsaw. The police arrive and arrest Fluttershy, who is then locked away in a mental institution.
4	"MAGIC.MOV"	Max Gilardi	April 11, 2012
Twilight Sparkle tries building a robot version of Rainbow Dash after her death in the previous episode so that all six members of the Elements of Harmony can be present. She succeeds in building the robot, only for it to join Discord in destroying Ponyville. Twilight Sparkle instead tries to resurrect Rainbow Dash, but fails.
5	"PARTY.MOV"	Max Gilardi	June 26, 2012
Pinkie Pie is the focus of an episode of True Equestria Story that details her self-destructive lifestyle of partying, drinking, and drug use. Twilight Sparkle tries to hold an intervention so Pinkie Pie can use her Element of Harmony, which goes poorly.
6	"SWAG.MOV"	Max Gilardi	February 20, 2013
One year after Discord's arrival to Ponyville, the town is largely destroyed. Rainbow Dash springs to life, claiming that she had merely been in a coma. She tries and fails to cheer up Twilight Sparkle, after which Rainbow Dash performs a Sonic Rainboom that reverses time to shortly after Discord began destroying Ponyville. Rainbow Dash transforms into a large version of herself and battles Discord. She is nearly defeated, but collects herself after hearing Scootaloo beg for her to get up. Twilight Sparkle summons a magical sword for Rainbow Dash, which she uses to destroy Discord. Rainbow Dash passes out and wakes in a hospital bed, alive but missing her wings, which were torn off during the battle. The townspeople rebuild Ponyville. Discord's severed head lands in Fluttershy's shed, which has been revamped into a cozy nook.

== See also ==
- List of fan works of the My Little Pony: Friendship Is Magic fandom
- Bronyspeak
- Clop
- Friendship Is Witchcraft
- Music of the My Little Pony: Friendship Is Magic fandom
- My Little Pony: Friendship Is Magic fan fiction
- PONY.MOV at IMDb
