= Rainbow Factory =

2011 My Little Pony fan fiction

- Author: AuroraDawn
- Language: English
- Genre: Horror, sci-fantasy, alternate universe
- Publication date: 2011
- Media type: My Little Pony: Friendship Is Magic fan fiction

Rainbow Factory is a 2011 horror fan fiction based on the animated television series My Little Pony: Friendship Is Magic.

== Synopsis ==
Set in Equestria, the story follows Scootaloo and two other young pegasi who fail their flight school examination and are sent to the Rainbow Factory. They discover that ponies are killed to manufacture rainbows, with Rainbow Dash overseeing the operation.

== Reception and influence ==
Along with Smile HD and Cupcakes, Rainbow Factory has been described as one of the most infamous creepypastas from the My Little Pony: Friendship Is Magic fandom.

Polish magazine Brohoof praised the atmosphere of Rainbow Factory but criticized its gratuitous violence and underdeveloped plot, awarding it a score of five out of ten. Jen A. Blue criticized its characterization and effectiveness as a horror story, but also suggested that its depiction of exploitation could be read as a satire of corporations. Riley Miller of Trill Mag described it as "unquestionably [...] a gory and edgy tale." Alesha Davis of The Post and Jaylin Emond-Hardin of The Western Howl, both having encountered Rainbow Factory and other disturbing fan material as children, wrote that they were less inclined to watch Friendship Is Magic or interact with its fandom as a result.

Rainbow Factory has inspired sequels and fan-made video adaptations.

== See also ==
- Brony fandom
- Fallout: Equestria
