= Friendship Is Witchcraft =

Fan-made parody of My Little Pony

- YouTube thumbnail
- Genre: Parody; Abridged series Black comedy
- Created by: Jenny Nicholson; Griffin Lewis
- Starring: Jenny Nicholson; Griffin Lewis; Various voice actors
- Country of origin: United States
- Original language: English
- No. of episodes: 10

Production
- Running time: 5–15 minutes

Original release
- Network: YouTube
- Release: June 16, 2011 – July 22, 2019

Friendship Is Witchcraft is a fan-made abridged parody web series based on the animated television show My Little Pony: Friendship Is Magic. Created by Jenny Nicholson and Griffin Lewis under the pseudonym "Sherclop Pones," the series ran from June 2011 to January 2016 and gained popularity within the My Little Pony: Friendship Is Magic fandom, also known as bronies.

== Overview ==
The series reimagines the characters and storylines of My Little Pony: Friendship Is Magic with darker, more satirical themes. Episodes typically feature voice acting, original musical numbers, and comedic reinterpretations of scenes from the original show.

In January 2013, Friendship Is Witchcraft was blocked from YouTube in the United States due to a DMCA claim by Hasbro.

== Reception and analysis ==
Author Jen A. Blue wrote that rather than simply parodying the show, Friendship Is Witchcraft parodied its fandom's expectations and fan works themselves, and noted that it used comedic elements often found in "cult shows" and meme-driven content. Unlike many abridged series, Friendship Is Witchcraft derives its humor from its familiar characters behaving in drastically different ways, and was known for its provocative humor and creative approach to the source material.

== Episodes ==
No.	Title	Based on	Original release date
1	"The Perfect Swarm"	"Swarm of the Century"	June 16, 2011
Twilight Sparkle prepares Ponyville for Princess Celestia's arrival while Fluttershy unleashes parasprites on the town. The ponies accidentally direct the creatures toward Molestopia, causing casualties. Pinkie Pie eventually leads the parasprites away using an instrumental version of Rebecca Black's "Friday".
2	"Read it and Sleep"	"Look Before You Sleep"	July 10, 2011
Applejack and Rarity seek shelter at the library during a storm. Twilight uses the opportunity to act out her fanfiction "Diamond in the Rough" starring thinly-veiled versions of her friends. Features a musical number set to "Art of the Dress".
3	"Dragone Baby Gone"	"Dragonshy"	September 8, 2011
The ponies are tasked with destroying a dragon threatening Ponyville. Fluttershy reveals the dragon is her estranged father and ultimately kills him off-screen. Features creative editing including ABBA music video clips during an "ABBAlanche".
4	"Cute From The Hip"	"Call of the Cutie"	November 2, 2011
Apple Bloom seeks her cutie mark while Pinkie Pie performs magic to resurrect her parents. Introduces robotic Sweetie Belle (also known as "Sweetie Bot"). The episode ends at a party where Apple Bloom meets Scootaloo and Sweetie Belle.
—	"Spike's Big Day"	"Griffon the Brush Off"	December 5, 2011
Short: Spike loses his five-year fantasy novel manuscript when Rainbow Dash scares him into hiccuping, causing his dragonfire to accidentally send the scrolls to Princess Celestia, who burns them thinking that they are Twilight's fan fiction.
5	"Neigh, Soul Sister"	"Sisterhooves Social"	January 6, 2012
Rarity is too busy preparing for a Smooze summoning ritual to spend time with robotic Sweetie Belle. After a fight, Sweetie Belle partners with Applejack for the Sentient Social contest, but Rarity ultimately chooses her sister over the apocalyptic ritual.
6	"Lunar Slander"	"Luna Eclipsed"	March 14, 2012
Princess Luna (called Molestia) attends Nightmare Night (here referred to as “Molest-fest”) but struggles socially. Twilight offers to help Luna gain acceptance in exchange for her "Princesshood". Pinkie's parents are reincarnated as foals in a post-credits scene.
7	"Cherry Bomb"	"The Last Roundup"	June 30, 2012
Applejack is scammed and held hostage in Con Junction with a bomb attached to her. Her friends misunderstand her coded messages for help. A background character named Raincloud sacrifices herself to save everyone by taking the bomb into the sky.
—	"Star Waving Mad"	"Owl's Well That Ends Well"	September 6, 2012
Short: Twilight uses her princess powers to force her friends to watch her puppet show. She carelessly raises the moon, which catches fire and crashes into Ponyville's main square, leaving Twilight's face etched on its surface.
8	"Foaly Matripony"	"A Canterlot Wedding"	February 23, 2013
Twilight wants to marry her adopted brother instead of letting him marry Princess Cadance. She convinces herself that Cadance is evil, attacks her, and locks her in crystal caverns before proceeding with her own wedding to her brother.
9	"Seed No Evil"	"One Bad Apple"	August 2, 2013
Babs Seed joins Diamond Tiara and Silver Spoon in bullying the Cutie Mark Crusaders. Inspired by a dark parody film called "Snowblind," the three attempt to use dark magic to blind Babs, though they ultimately fail.
10a	"Horse Women - Part 1: Grazed and Confused"	Equestria Girls	April 19, 2014
Twilight becomes an alicorn and creates a political crisis. Princess Celestia sends her through a portal to the human world, where she and Spike are transformed into human and dog respectively at a high school.
10b	"Horse Women - Part 2: Mare-is Bueller's Neigh Off"	Equestria Girls	January 6, 2016
Continuation of Twilight and Spike's adventures in the human world.
10	"You Smooze, You Lose"	"Make New Friends but Keep Discord"	June 4, 2015
Live reading only: The planned final episode was cancelled and only exists as a live reading by the creator. A fan-animated version was later created independently.
—	"Celestia's Standalone Adventure!"	"The Crystal Empire – Part 1"	July 22, 2019
Crossover: Princess Celestia is visited by Pinkie Pie from another abridged series. Celestia has frozen all other characters in place because she's tired of their antics, but is driven further insane by a constantly playing trumpet sound.

== See also ==
- List of fan works of the My Little Pony: Friendship Is Magic fandom
- Music of the My Little Pony: Friendship Is Magic fandom
- My Little Pony: Friendship Is Magic fan fiction
- PONY.MOV
