= Love & Ponystep =

Electronic dance music album by Vylet Pony

Studio album by Vylet Pony
- Released: July 11, 2025
- Genres: Electronic dance music; brostep; electropop; brony music
- Length: 95:38
- Label: Horse Friends Music / 32.7 The Creek
- Producer: Vylet Pony

Vylet Pony chronology
| Monarch of Monsters (2024) | Love & Ponystep (2025) | Gonarch's Lair (2026) |

Singles from Love & Ponystep
- 1. "My Love is a Quickscope" Released: June 26, 2025; 2. "Webpunk" Released: July 3, 2025

Love & Ponystep is the twenty-first studio album by American electronic musician Vylet Pony (Zelda Trixie Lulamoon), self-released on July 11, 2025 by Lulamoon under her independent vanity label Horse Friends Music / 32.7 The Creek. It was inspired heavily by electronic dance music, brostep, and electropop, including extensive sampling from video games and Internet media from the 2010s. The album explores themes of Internet culture, criticism of copyright, and self-acceptance within an allegorical story mirroring the experience of Lulamoon to My Little Pony-inspired original characters (also known as ponysonas).

== Background and composition ==
The album's title references ponystep, a bronyspeak term that originated in the early years of the brony fandom that described a brony music subgenre that combined dubstep with My Little Pony content. Following the conclusion of Friendship Is Magic in 2019, brony music evolved from remixes of episodes to songs that often have minimal direct references to the show, with some brony musicians using the fandom primarily as a creative outlet rather than drawing directly from show content.

Love & Ponystep was conceived in 2023, with Lulamoon's interest in 2010s EDM artists being reciprocated through meeting fellow musician Tracey Brakes, and subsequent research of techniques and samples from pioneering EDM musicians such as Skrillex and Savant resulted in Girls Who Are Wizards, an album Lulamoon describes as "an initial test of strength for these ideas". Brakes is credited in the album for production in the title track, and is included in the special thanks for their friendship and inspiration.

Love & Ponystep was partly inspired by Lulamoon's personal experiences with a breakup. The album follows the story of two alicorn characters from Lulamoon's "Wayfarer" universe, an alternative universe based upon the Friendship Is Magic continuity: Top Five Videos (a lesbian alicorn YouTube host) and Dubstep Growl (a nonverbal, purple alicorn DJ), tracking their breakup and eventual reunion.

The album features narration segments from Lenval Brown, most known for his narration and voice work on the video games Disco Elysium and Ultrakill, as "Lodestar", a realization of Top Five Videos' subconscious that provides spoken word segments throughout the album. During a Disco Elysium livestream from Lulamoon in early 2025, viewers encouraged her to reach out to Brown for his vocal qualities, and Brown accepted the correspondence. Brown is credited in the album's special thanks for his "incredible performance and open mind".

Lulamoon also described the album as an attempt to reclaim traditionally masculine interests, stating: "I was also always a Call of Duty fan, for better and for worse; and as a trans woman, it's always felt weird to embrace that out of fear of leaning into some sort of traditionally masculine interest. So I wanted to see how gay and feminine I could take that shit." The album heavily samples Call of Duty: Black Ops II throughout its 95-minute runtime and pays homage to Skrillex, particularly interpolating his remix of Benny Benassi's "Cinema" in the title track.

== Themes ==
Continuing thematically from Lulamoon's previous album, Monarch of Monsters, which deals with finding self-love through inward trauma, Love & Ponystep views the relationship and breakup of the main characters, Top Five Videos and Dubstep Growl, as an allegory for Lulamoon's own experiences with heartbreak and her subsequent pursuit for self-improvement.

Within the songs, the album addresses themes of internet culture, piracy, and criticisms of corporations.

== Reception ==
The album received positive reviews from critics. Pitchfork awarded it a score of 7.8 out of 10, with reviewer Kieran Press-Reynolds calling it "so clever and so admirably unhinged" and praising its "anything-goes experiments that urge listeners to be kind and live their truest lives." Ringtone Mag described it as "a beautiful love letter to being yourself, weird interests and all" and noted its celebration of 2010s internet culture. Australian newspaper Green Left included the album in its monthly list of the top 10 protest music of August 2025. Pitchfork listed Love & Ponystep as the 25th best pop album of 2025; the critic Samuel Hyland highlighted its theming and use of sampling.

== Track listing ==
Digital release
| No. | Title | Length |
|---|---|---|
| 1. | "Angel with a Longshot (Courier Overture)" (ft. Jedwill) | 4:54 |
| 2. | "Ch 1: SVU-AS (Heartbreak Intro)" (ft. Lenval Brown) | 1:21 |
| 3. | "My Love is a Quickscope" | 3:47 |
| 4. | "Dual Headed Hydranoid" (ft. Namii & SadisticTushi) | 3:08 |
| 5. | "Worst rave EVER" | 3:34 |
| 6. | "Falling in Love With a Corporate Illustration" | 8:44 |
| 7. | "Wonka X Howl" | 4:13 |
| 8. | "Ch 2: XPR-50 (It's All About the Game)" (ft. Lenval Brown) | 2:24 |
| 9. | "Webpunk" (ft. NekoSnicker) | 3:58 |
| 10. | "Peace, Love, Glalie (And, in 2009, Somebody Stole My Ancient Mew Card)" (ft. Shelly the Android Lobster) | 3:52 |
| 11. | "The Slow Dance" | 5:25 |
| 12. | "Comet Catcher and the Reek Fish" | 5:07 |
| 13. | "Lightning Bolt" | 4:10 |
| 14. | "Ch 3: Ballista (Dear Aria, I Love Myself)" (ft. Lenval Brown) | 3:09 |
| 15. | "Walking Beside a Dragonfly" (ft. Lunari Lotus) | 8:28 |
| 16. | "Jester" | 4:54 |
| 17. | "LiveLaughLove2" (ft. moesnail) | 5:24 |
| 18. | "A Digital Flower Field" | 4:08 |
| 19. | "Ch 4: DSR-50 (O' Laniakea, Quell Not The Love Which Overflows From Me)" (ft. Lenval Brown) | 1:07 |
| 20. | "Love & Ponystep" (ft. Tracey Brakes) | 10:01 |
| 21. | "Ghostie Dub (Here To Light This Up)" (Outro/Bonus Track) | 3:43 |
| Total length: | | 1:35:38 |

== See also ==
- Music of the My Little Pony: Friendship Is Magic fandom
