= Fallout: Equestria =

2011 fan fiction

- Author: Kkat (pen name)
- Language: English
- Genre: Post-apocalyptic, atompunk, sci-fantasy, supernatural fiction
- Publication date: April 12, 2011
- Media type: My Little Pony: Friendship Is Magic fan fiction
- Pages: 2,062

Fallout: Equestria is a post-apocalyptic My Little Pony: Friendship Is Magic fan fiction novel based on the Fallout video game series. It was originally published by pseudonymous user Kkat on April 12, 2011. It is split into five volumes, totalling 620,000 words across more than 2,000 pages. The novel has been published as an ebook and audiobook also as a physical hardcover novel. The novel is considered to be one of the most popular My Little Pony: Friendship Is Magic fan fiction, having developed a large following of its own.

== Synopsis ==
The series is a transformative fanwork, based on the Fallout video game franchise and the animated series My Little Pony: Friendship Is Magic. Fallout: Equestria places the magical ponies of the Friendship Is Magic franchise within the post-apocalyptic setting of the Fallout games. In the novel, the fictional world of Equestria enters a resource war with the Zebra Empire. The resulting conflict leaves both continents as mutant-filled wastelands, with survivors living in underground fallout shelters called "Stables". Within this setting, the novel combines various cyberpunk, atompunk and retrofuturistic elements with the fantasy elements of Friendship Is Magic. The incorporation of more violent and mature content contributes to a darker overall tone than the Friendship Is Magic source material.

== Reception and influence ==
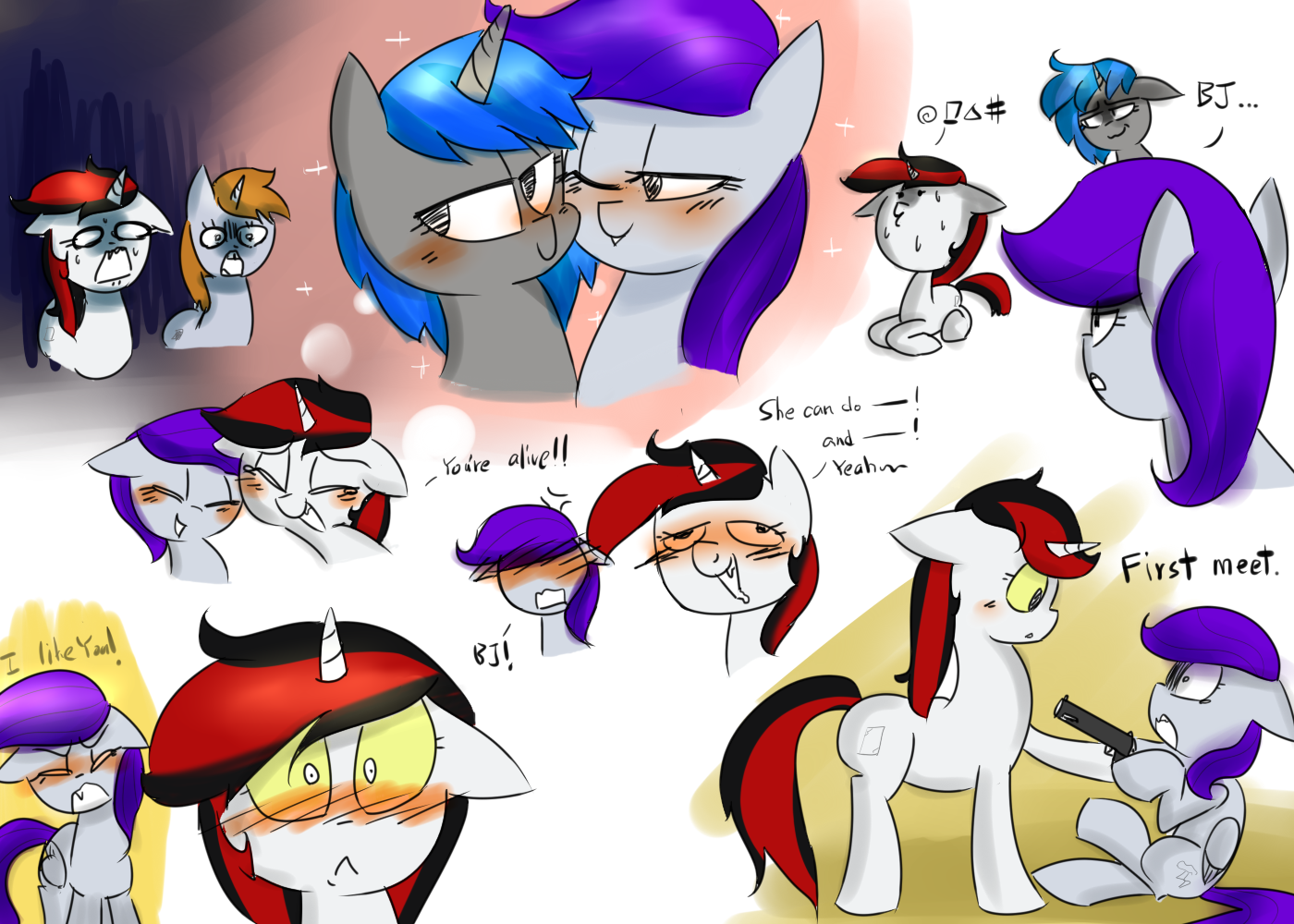
Fallout: Equestria has inspired a large amount of fan art and fan works.

The novel is considered to be a major cornerstone of the My Little Pony: Friendship Is Magic fandom, due to its scale and popularity. This has been reflected in the immense amount of fanworks that have been undertaken since 2012, including music, fan art and non-canonical spin offs or side stories. A fanmade video game based on the novel was developed by The Overmare Studios, titled Ashes of Equestria. It was originally considered a mod, but eventually became a stand-alone project, which is still in production. It uses a modified version of the 3D graphic engine Unity; however, there has been some confusion regarding it, as it looks similar to the Gamebryo engine used for Fallout 3, a game developed by Bethesda Game Studios. Zachary D. Palmer, in an article for the journal Men and Masculinities, discussed the fandom around the novel as an outlet for male fans of My Little Pony to combine traditionally masculine interests like guns and first-person shooter games with the more traditionally feminine content of the original series.

Fallout: Equestria was the theme of the 2017 edition of TrotCon, a brony convention in Columbus, Ohio. As of 2012, the novel has been translated into seven languages, and had inspired fan works and fan art. Despite the popularity of Fallout: Equestria, the novel's author has remained anonymous, choosing not to reveal their real name or gender.

== See also ==
- All the Young Dudes – a Harry Potter fan fiction also written and published by a pseudonymous author that gained a large following on its own.
- My Little Pony: Friendship Is Magic fan fiction
- Rainbow Factory
