= Brony fandom =

Fans of My Little Pony

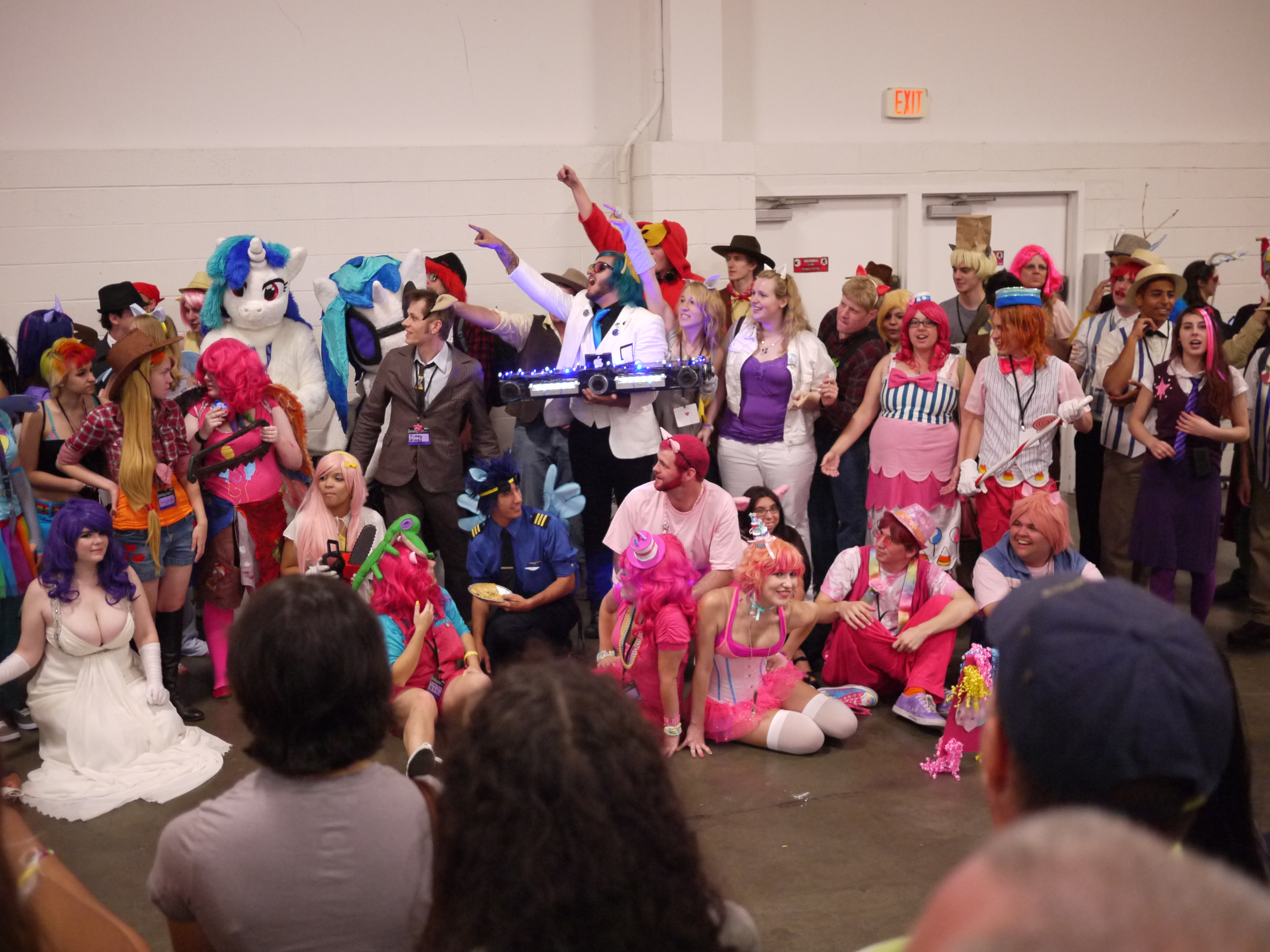
Cosplayers of numerous characters from My Little Pony: Friendship Is Magic at the 2012 Summer BronyCon

The brony fandom is composed of adult fans of My Little Pony: Friendship Is Magic, an animated children's television series produced by Hasbro that ran from 2010 to 2019 as part of the My Little Pony toy franchise. The series tied in with the 2010 relaunch of dolls, play sets and original programming for the American children's cable channel The Hub (later rebranded as Hub Network, and later, Discovery Family). Lauren Faust was selected as the creative developer and executive producer for the show based on her previous experience with other animated children's shows such as The Powerpuff Girls and Foster's Home for Imaginary Friends on Cartoon Network. Under Hasbro's guidance, Faust developed the show to appeal to the target demographic of young girls, but created characters and settings that challenged formerly stereotypical norms of "girly" images, adding adventure and humorous elements to keep parents interested.

The series initially received widespread acclaim from both television critics and parental groups. It also found a large audience of adult Internet users in late 2010 and early 2011, forming a subculture. These fans, mostly consisting of adult men, were drawn to the show's main characters (collectively known as the Mane Six), stories, animation style and the influence of the show's propagation as an Internet meme. The fandom adopted the name bronies, a portmanteau of bro and pony. The term pegasister, a portmanteau of pegasus and sister, is sometimes used to describe female fans of the series, though the majority of female fans prefer to identify themselves as bronies and reject the label of pegasister. Though initially considered to propagate the humorous and ironic concept of adults enjoying a show intended for young girls, the fandom gradually showed over time a deeper, genuine appreciation for the show far beyond this concept, a trend that has come to be known as "new sincerity". Fans have created numerous fan works in writing, music, art, gaming and video based on the show, have established websites and fan conventions for the show and have participated in charitable events around the show and those that create it. However, the fandom has drawn criticism from the media and pundits who have derided the older demographic's embrace of a television series marketed towards young girls as well as mass amounts of fan-produced pornographic artwork and literature by bronies.

The appreciation of the show by an older audience came as a surprise to Hasbro, Faust, and others involved with its development, but they have embraced the older fans while also staying focused on the show's intended audience. Such reciprocity has included participation in fan conventions by the show's voice actors and producers, recognition of the brony fandom in official promotional material, and incorporating background characters popularized by the fans (such as the fandom-named "Derpy Hooves") into in-jokes within the show. As a result of these efforts in part, My Little Pony: Friendship Is Magic has become a major commercial success with the series becoming the highest rated original production in Hub Network's broadcast history.

== History ==
=== Origins ===
One of the first critical reviews of Friendship Is Magic, which was published shortly after the initial broadcast in October 2010, was written by Amid Amidi of the animation website Cartoon Brew, who wrote that the show was a sign of "the end of the creator-driven era in TV animation". Amidi's essay expressed concern that assigning a talent like Faust to a toy-centric show was part of a trend towards a focus on profitable genres of animation such as toy tie-ins to deal with a fragmented viewing audience and overall "an admission of defeat for the entire movement, a white flag-waving moment for the TV animation industry." The article said this concern was over the fact that more and more shows seem to be driven by company executives who want to sell their products, rather than creators. Though the show had been discussed on 4chan's 'comics and cartoon' board ('/co/') before the essay's publication, the alarmist nature of the essay led to more interest in the show, resulting in a positive response for the series for its plot, characters, and animation style. This reaction soon spread to the other boards of 4chan, where elements of the show quickly inspired recurring jokes and memes on the site. Some of these included adopting phrases from the show like anypony, everypony and nopony, instead of anybody, everybody and nobody, or jokingly stating that they watch the show for the plot, a reference to the ponies' flanks.

The number of Friendship Is Magic posts drew attention on the site. Fans of the show defended it against various trolling attacks from other 4chan boards, leading to a temporary ban on the discussion of anything related to ponies. Christopher Poole, the founder of 4chan, briefly acknowledged the popularity of the show on the site at the 2011 South by Southwest festival. On February 16, 2012, Poole created /mlp/, a dedicated board for discussion of the show and its fandom. Though the discussion of the show continued at 4chan, fans created other venues to discuss it, and the fandom spread to other Internet forums.

=== Growth and popularity ===
The adult interest in the show is comparable to that of Looney Tunes, Animaniacs, Tiny Toon Adventures, Rocko's Modern Life, Phineas and Ferb, The Powerpuff Girls, SpongeBob SquarePants, and Yo Gabba Gabba!; older audiences appreciate jokes aimed at adult viewers and a sense of nostalgia for older cartoons and animated films. Many of the aforementioned shows had attracted college-aged fans who, when Friendship Is Magic was airing, would be raising children of their own. The show references works that older viewers would recognize, such as I Love Lucy, The Benny Hill Show, Jaws, 2001: A Space Odyssey, Diamond Dogs, The Big Lebowski, Ghostbusters, Star Wars and Fear and Loathing in Las Vegas. Most of these fans are surprised by their fondness for the show. Shaun Scotellaro, operator of Equestria Daily, one of the main fan websites for the show, said, "Honestly, if someone were to have told me I'd be writing a pony blog seven months ago, I would have called them insane." He commented that the spread among adults was accelerated by its presence in online gaming. Mike Fahey, an editor for the gaming website Kotaku, noted that the fandom was "building friendships among a diverse group of people that otherwise might have just sat on either side of the Internet, flinging insults at each other". Dr. Patrick Edwards, who performed several "Brony Studies" to survey and analyze the fandom, observed that the brony fandom, unlike most other fandoms which "aren't welcoming to people who are different", promotes the show's message of love and tolerance. Further interest came from the furry community, which includes a large number of animation fans. One contributor to "The Brony Study" (below), Dr. Marsha Redden said that the adult fans are "a reaction to the US having been engrossed in terrorism for the past ten years" in a manner similar to the Cold War, and are "tired of being afraid, tired of angst and animosity"; the show and its fandom are outlets from those strifes. She compared the brony fandom to that of the bohemian and beatniks after World War II and of the hippies after the Vietnam War. In a similar vein, Amy Keating Rogers - one of the show's writers - believes that the fans have come to like Friendship Is Magic due to "so much cynicism and negativity out there in so many [other] shows" while the show "has such a positive message" that counters this.

=== Decline ===
The National Post reported in early 2019 that several prominent brony conventions like BronyCAN had been over for years and that the fandom was declining due to the show's end becoming increasingly apparent. Unconfirmed (later confirmed) leaks of information from Hasbro stated that the show's ninth season, which premiered in 2019, would be the last for the "G4" (Generation 4) ponies. The fifth generation of My Little Pony was launched in October 2021 with the CGI animated film My Little Pony: A New Generation followed by the animated series of Tell Your Tale and Make Your Mark in 2022. According to studies of the brony fandom, G5 has failed to capture the "lightning in a bottle" that G4 did, and modern brony discussions still revolve around G4 rather than G5. G5 of My Little Pony was cancelled in 2024.

=== Revival (2020–present) ===
The brony fandom continues to produce new content in the 2020s, and fan-created works experienced a sharp increase in popularity during the COVID-19 lockdowns in 2020. The music of the brony fandom has evolved from remixes of the show to songs that sometimes have minimal direct references to the episodes, and in-person brony music concerts continue to be held as of 2025. Examples of modern brony fan works that have gained mainstream attention include the Vylet Pony album Love & Ponystep and the text-to-speech website 15.ai. As part of a renewed interest in the franchise due to childhood nostalgia, My Little Pony has partnered with major Millennial and Generation Z brands. My Little Pony fan works have also gained popularity on TikTok. The Chinese brony fandom has also seen a major resurgence in the 2020s. Equestria Daily reported in 2024 that "cartoon horses are all the rage [in China], with armadas of artists, plushie makes, animators, and more all producing piles of pony for a ravenous fandom", and in 2025 that the volume of Friendship Is Magic merchandise distributed across China continued to be "massive."

== Influence and fan activities ==
=== Analysis ===
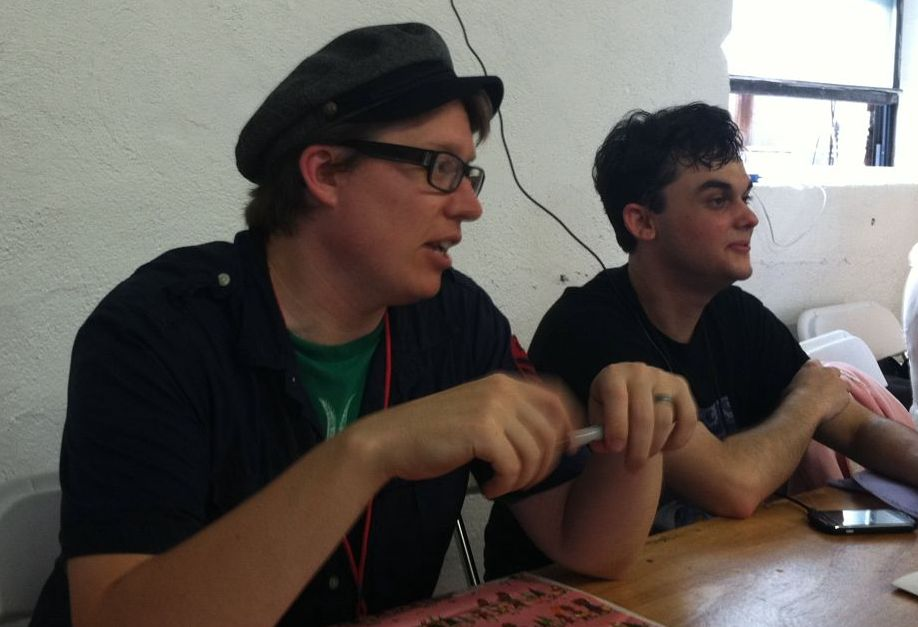
Jayson Thiessen, supervising director (left), and Shaun Scotellaro ("Sethisto"), the founder of the fansite Equestria Daily, at BroNYCon 2011

Older fans of the show use the word brony, a portmanteau of the words bro and pony. Though this generally refers to male fans, the term is applicable to fans of any gender. Another term, pegasister (a portmanteau of the words pegasus/pegasi and sister), has been used to refer to older female fans of the show, though a 2021 study published in the Journal of Gender Studies found that the majority of female fans of the show dislike the term and prefer to identify as a brony over pegasister. According to the study, the use of a separate gendered term is "isolating" for most female fans as it implies that they are not truly part of the fandom; they consider the term brony as more inclusive than pegasister. One female fan commented: "I hate when people call me a pegasister, 'cause I don’t like to separate myself by gender."

Two informal surveys of 2,300 and 9,000 participants respectively revealed that the average age of adult fans is around 21, that approximately 86% were male, and that 63% were currently pursuing a college degree or higher qualification. A subsequent 2013 survey with over 21,000 respondents showed similar numbers, and highlighted that the majority of fans were in the 15–30 age range, with the average age between 19 and 20, and over 65% were heterosexual. Further, using the Jungian personality test, the survey revealed that the largest fraction of respondents (approximately 27%) fell into the "INTJ" classification, which normally only occurs in 1–3% of the population, according to the surveyors. Many in the fandom who had difficulty in meeting others or being treated fairly by others found the fandom as a way to meet people with similar interests and become more social. Hub Network's CEO and President Margaret Loesch, who was the executive producer of the 1980s and 1990s animated My Little Pony television shows, noted that there were male fans of those past shows, but there are considerably more for Friendship Is Magic due to the quality of the show and the influence of social media and the Internet.

A fan-conducted "herd census" suggested that, as of September 2012, there were between 7 and 12.4 million people in the United States that would identify themselves as bronies. A more detailed study, "The Brony Study", was being conducted in 2012 by Dr. Patrick Edwards, a psychology professor at Wofford College with his neuropsychologist associate Dr. Redden. The two had initially compiled one of the aforementioned informal surveys and Edwards has presented the results at the ongoing brony conventions. Edwards noted that the brony culture provided "the opportunity to study a fan phenomenon from its inception", and planned to continue the survey to watch the evolution of the culture. Professor emeritus Bill Ellis of Penn State University has compared the brony culture to that of otaku, fans of Japanese anime. Ellis, speaking at the 2012 AnimeNEXT convention, considered that both bronies and otaku fans are "psychologically and developmentally normal" and are simply "non-majoritarian" in their choice of active interests. Ellis noted that fans of both groups often are ridiculed for their interest in media targeted for the opposite gender.

Though the initial growth of the fandom may have come from 4chan participants enjoying the ironic nature of grown men enjoying a show for girls, the fandom continued to grow based on sincere appreciation of the work. Robert Thompson, a professor of media studies at Syracuse University, stated that "It's one thing for guys to like motorcycles and muscle cars and soccer. For a guy to like My Little Pony, it's so out there that it becomes almost avant garde. It has a hip quality to it." According to Angela Watchcutter of Wired, the fandom is an example of internet neo-sincerity, where these older viewers watch the show "un-ironically" and "without guilt" breaking gender stereotypes, furthermore creating new material around it. Prof. Roberta Pearson of the University of Nottingham in film and television studies stated that "This is a level of fan devotion I've not seen before", while Prof. Charles Soukup of the University of Northern Colorado in communication studies suggested that this effort is an indication of the "ultra-cult era" that bronies exhibit, where "media consumers discover extremely unexpected and obscure media texts to cultivate uniqueness and distinctiveness for their mediated identities". Jessica Klein, writing for Salon, noted that the fandom was an especially welcoming space for female fans in comparison to other male-dominated fandoms.

=== Online communities ===
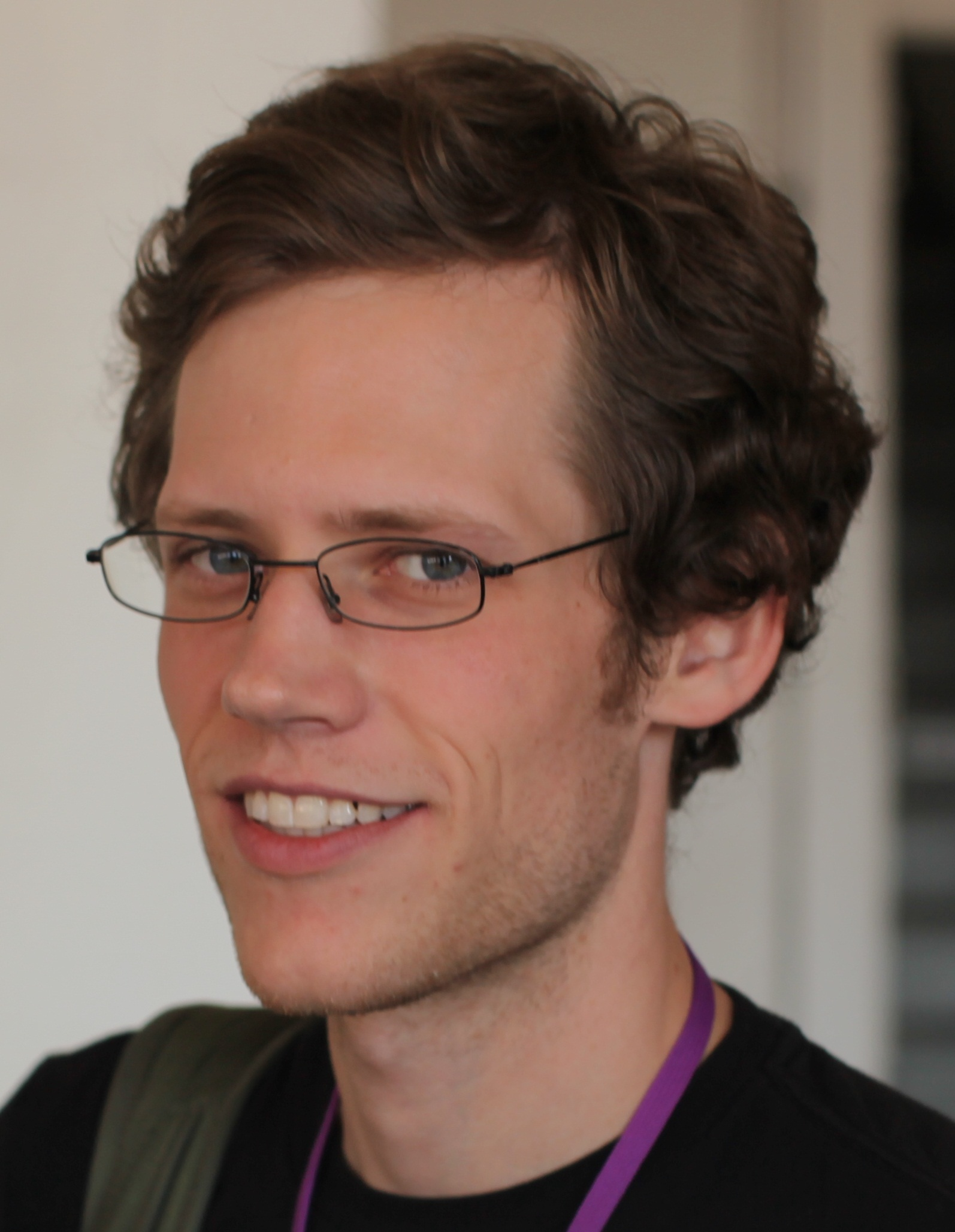
Christopher Poole, 4chan's founder, in 2012

Numerous online communities have been established for the brony fandom. Websites such as Equestria Daily and Ponychan were created for fans to share artwork, stories, music, and news about the show. Founded in January 2011, Equestria Daily had over 36 million pageviews in its first 9 months, and has since surpassed 500 million views (June 2014). The blog, which received more than 175,000 visits a day and was fully funded by advertising revenue, was established by 23-year-old college student Shaun Scotellaro for the purpose of collecting fan fiction and news specific to Friendship Is Magic. Scotellaro eventually cut back on his community college classes in order to continue running the site out of his parents' house in Glendale, Arizona, when it grew in popularity. He believed the show needed a unified fan base at the time, as there existed an overarching concern that Hasbro would not be authorizing a second season. In September 2017, selected archives of Equestria Daily were included in the Library of Congress's "Web Cultures Web Archive Collection" by the American Folklife Center; the collection was established to "documenting the creation and sharing of emergent cultural traditions on the web". In 2017, 2022, and 2023, Friendship Is Magic fans participated in r/place, creating artwork of Rainbow Dash, Derpy Hooves, and other characters that were then defended against rival factions, Twitch streamers, and griefers.

/mlp/, the My Little Pony board on 4chan, was created in 2012 following the growing popularity of pony-related content on 4chan. Derpibooru, the largest imageboard for My Little Pony fan art, hosts over 3.2 million images as of September 2025. Fimfiction is the largest repository for My Little Pony fan fiction and hosts over 155,000 published stories as of 2025. Ponychan (which shut down in January 2024) was one of the earliest dedicated imageboards for the brony fandom that was created as a response to the backlash and resentment from non-brony 4chan users. Multiple subreddits are dedicated to My Little Pony, with r/mylittlepony serving as the main community hub. YouTube hosts numerous My Little Pony-focused channels dedicated to analysis, reviews, animations, and music.

=== Language and vernacular ===
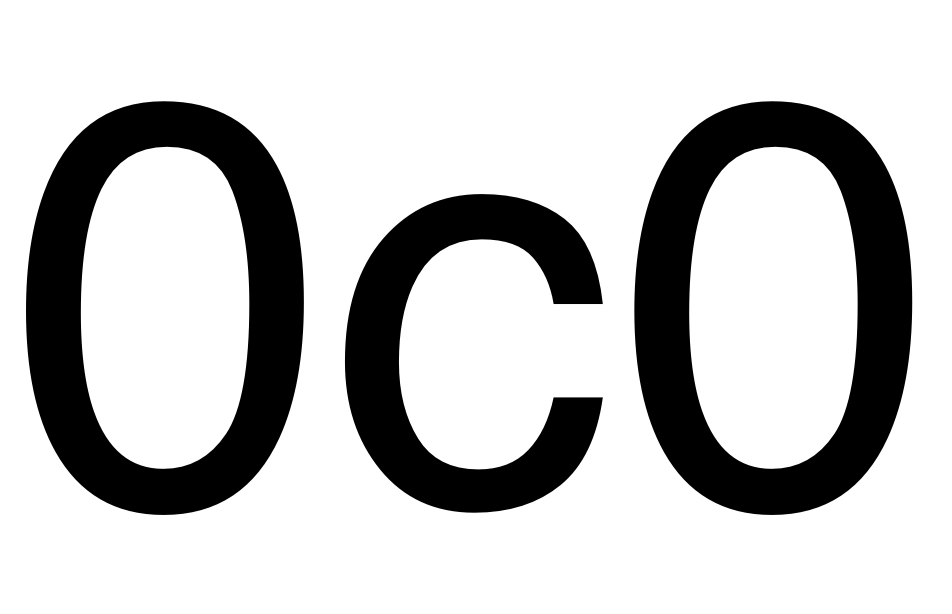
An example of an emoticon used in bronyspeak, meant to resemble a pony's face

The brony fandom has developed a fandom vernacular language known as bronyspeak, which heavily references the show's content. Examples of bronyspeak terminology include ponysona (a personalized pony character representing the creator), ponification (transformation of non-pony entities into pony form), dubtrot (a brony version of dubstep), brohoof (a brony version of brofist), and brony itself. Hasbro officially acknowledged the fandom and its fanspeak in 2011, and it has since been the subject of academic attention as an example of Internet-enabled vernacular culture that emphasizes community belonging and behavioral boundaries.

=== Identity and self-representation ===
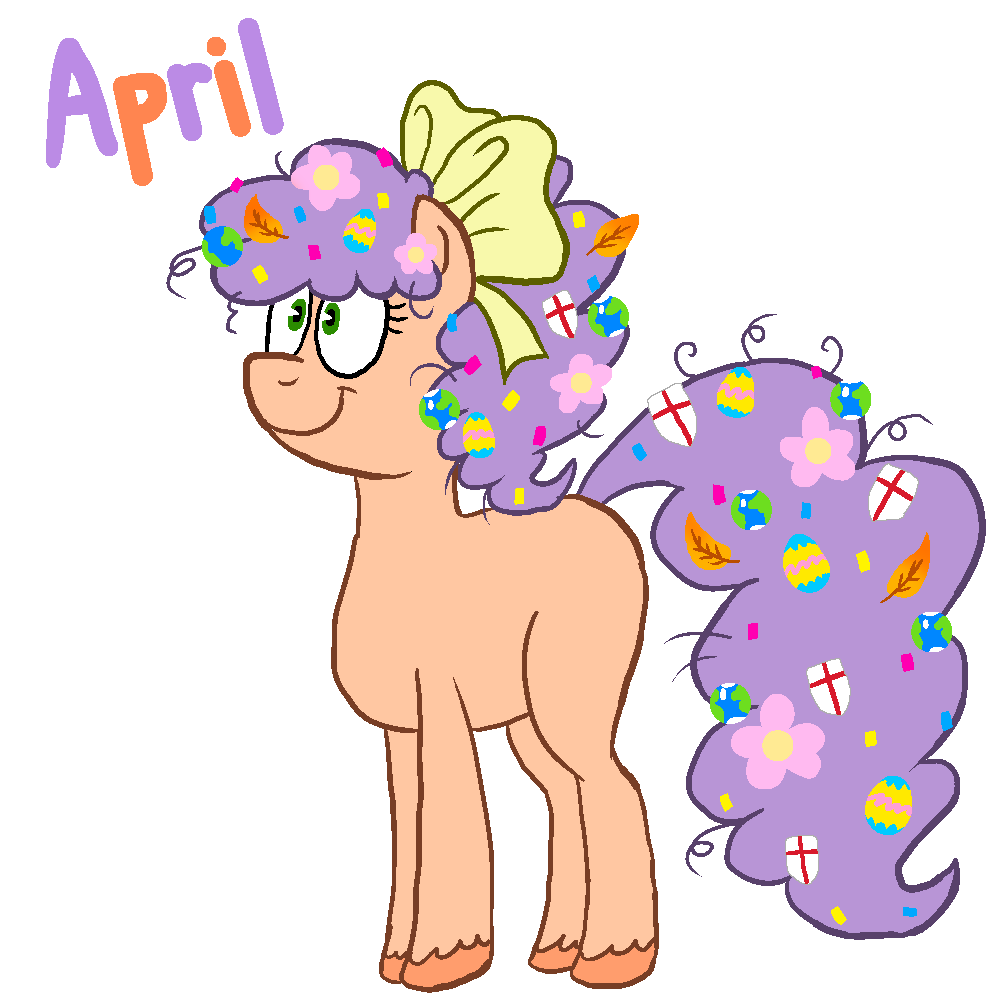
An example of a blank flank original character ponysona design

Many bronies create personalized pony characters called ponysonas to represent themselves, similar to fursonas among the furry fandom. These characters typically incorporate elements of the creator's personality, physical traits, or interests translated into pony form following the show's visual style. Studies indicate that approximately 39% of bronies have a ponysona. Unlike fursonas, which often involve physical embodiment through fursuits, ponysonas are primarily expressed through digital art, roleplay, and online interactions.

=== Fan conventions ===
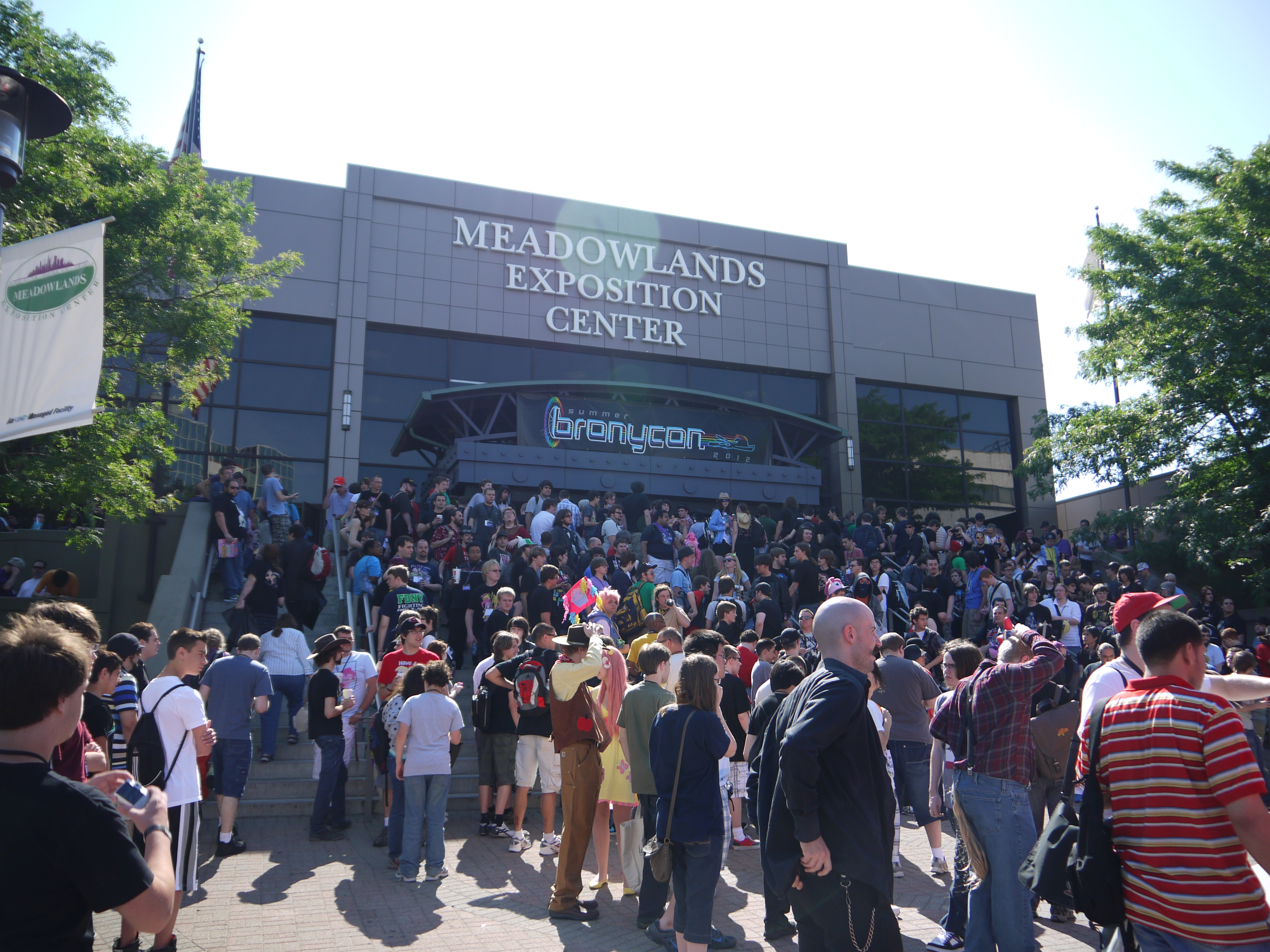
Bronies waiting at the start of the 2012 Summer BronyCon convention

Fans commonly organize local meet-ups and conventions in their local areas. One of the first published conventions was BronyCon, which was first held in New York City with the show's supervising director as a guest. The first BronyCon attracted 100 people, but the third, held in January 2012, was attended by 800, and the fourth expanded to a two-day event in June 2012 at the Meadowlands Exposition Center in New Jersey, with more than 4,000 attending with developer Lauren Faust and voice actors John de Lancie, Tara Strong, Andrea Libman, Peter New, Lee Tockar, Amy Keating Rogers, Cathy Weseluck and Meghan McCarthy as special guests. Strong even attended the convention Canterlot Gardens in a full Twilight Sparkle cosplay to surprise fans. Subsequent BronyCon events moved to a larger space provided by the Baltimore Convention Center, with more than 8,000 attending.

Other brony conventions include Everfree Northwest in Seattle, Washington, Midwestria in Chicago, Illinois, Canterlot Gardens in Cleveland, Ohio, Equestria LA in Los Angeles, BABSCon in Burlingame, California, Ponycon NY in the metropolitan New York City region, BronyCAN in British Columbia, Canada, GalaCon in Ludwigsburg, Germany, BUCK in Manchester, United Kingdom, PonyCon AU in Sydney, Australia, Crystal Mountain Pony Con in Salt Lake City, Utah and Pacific PonyCon in San Diego, California. Nearly a dozen brony conventions were planned in 2012. In addition, established My Little Pony conventions prior to the Friendship Is Magic show, such as the My Little Pony Fair and UK PonyCon, saw increases in their numbers due to the attendance of bronies. A long-running annual art show, the "My Little Pony Project", where artists re-imagine My Little Pony figurines and toys into works of art, also saw additional attendance and contributions from the brony community.

=== Charity and fundraising ===
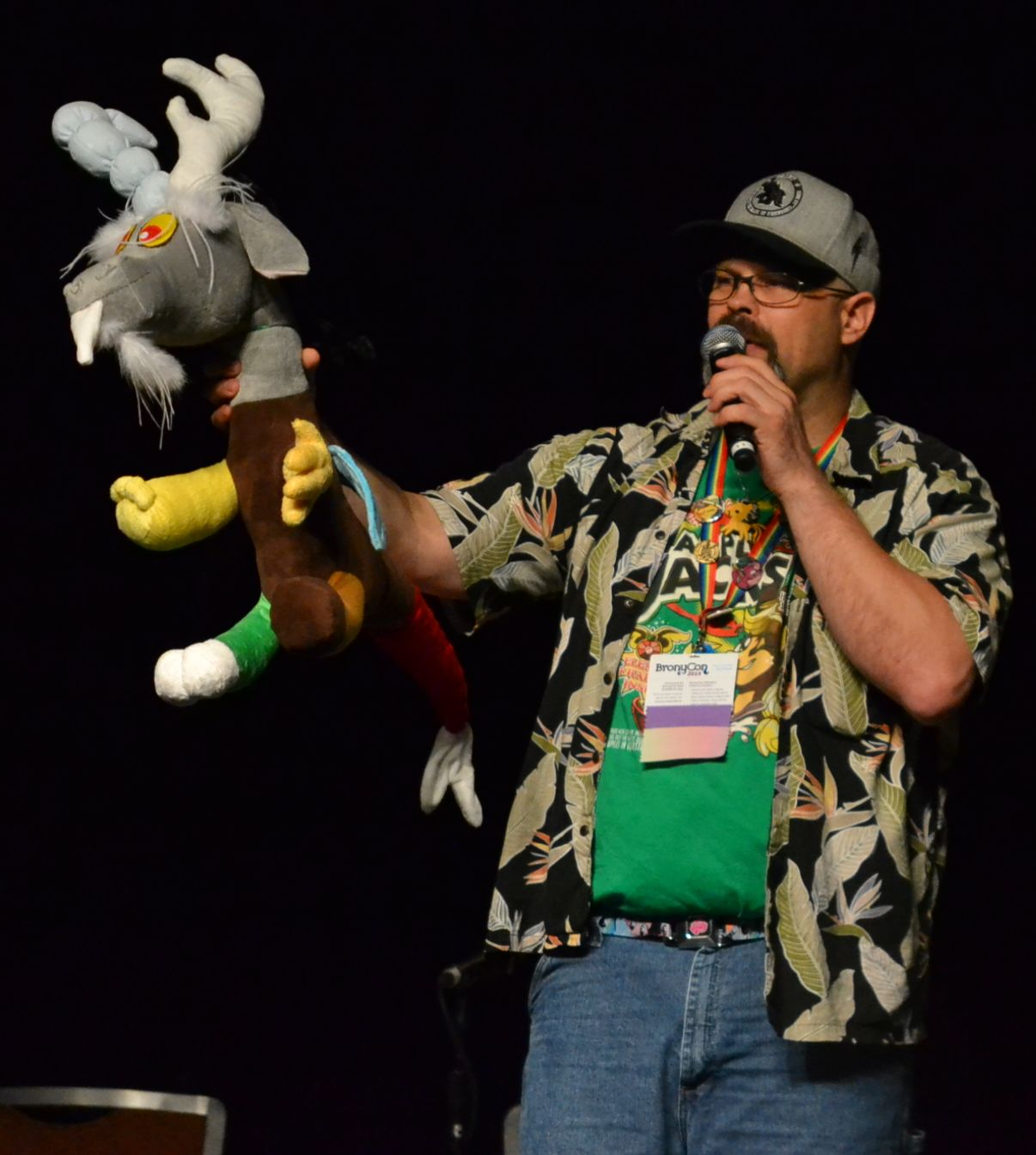
An auctioneer presenting a Discord plushie at the 2014 BronyCon charity auction

The brony fandom has a strong charitable culture, paralleling the show's moral lessons of kindness and compassion. The Brony Thank You Fund was originally established to create a fan-funded advertisement to air on Hub Network as a thank you to the show's creators in November 2012. The charitable drive far exceeded its goal, with additional funds used to give money to provide toys for children through Toys For Tots. The fund has since incorporated in the state of New Hampshire, and successfully registered as a non-profit 501(c)(3) organization under United States law. They claim to be the first such media-related fandom to achieve this status. In December 2013, the Fund donated $50,000 to endow an animation scholarship in perpetuity at the California Institute of the Arts. Similarly, a group called "Bronies for Good" ran blood drives and raised over $60,000 during 2012 for charities like the Children's Cancer Association, Room to Read, CureSearch, and Your Siblings. Voice actor Tara Strong has gained help from the fandom for her "Kiki's Cancer Fund" to help the daughter of a close friend who had been diagnosed with a brain tumor, and she stated that the child "wouldn't be alive today without the My Little Pony fans", raising $100,000 to help; however, the girl subsequently died of her illness.

In January 2014, 11-year-old Michael Morones of North Carolina attempted suicide after being bullied by his schoolmates for watching the show. His subsequent hospitalization spurred a significant response from the brony community, including members of the show's cast and crew. They launched a charity drive to assist with medical expenses and establish a non-profit organization dedicated to fighting bullying. Within a week, these efforts raised over $48,000, and exceeded $72,000 within a month. Morones, whose suicide attempt left him in a vegetative state, died on October 27, 2021, at the age of 19.

Brony conventions tend to be non-profit organizations with a heavy focus on charity. In 2015, BronyCon's charity auction raised $30,645 for CureSearch for Children's Cancer.

=== Arts and entertainment ===
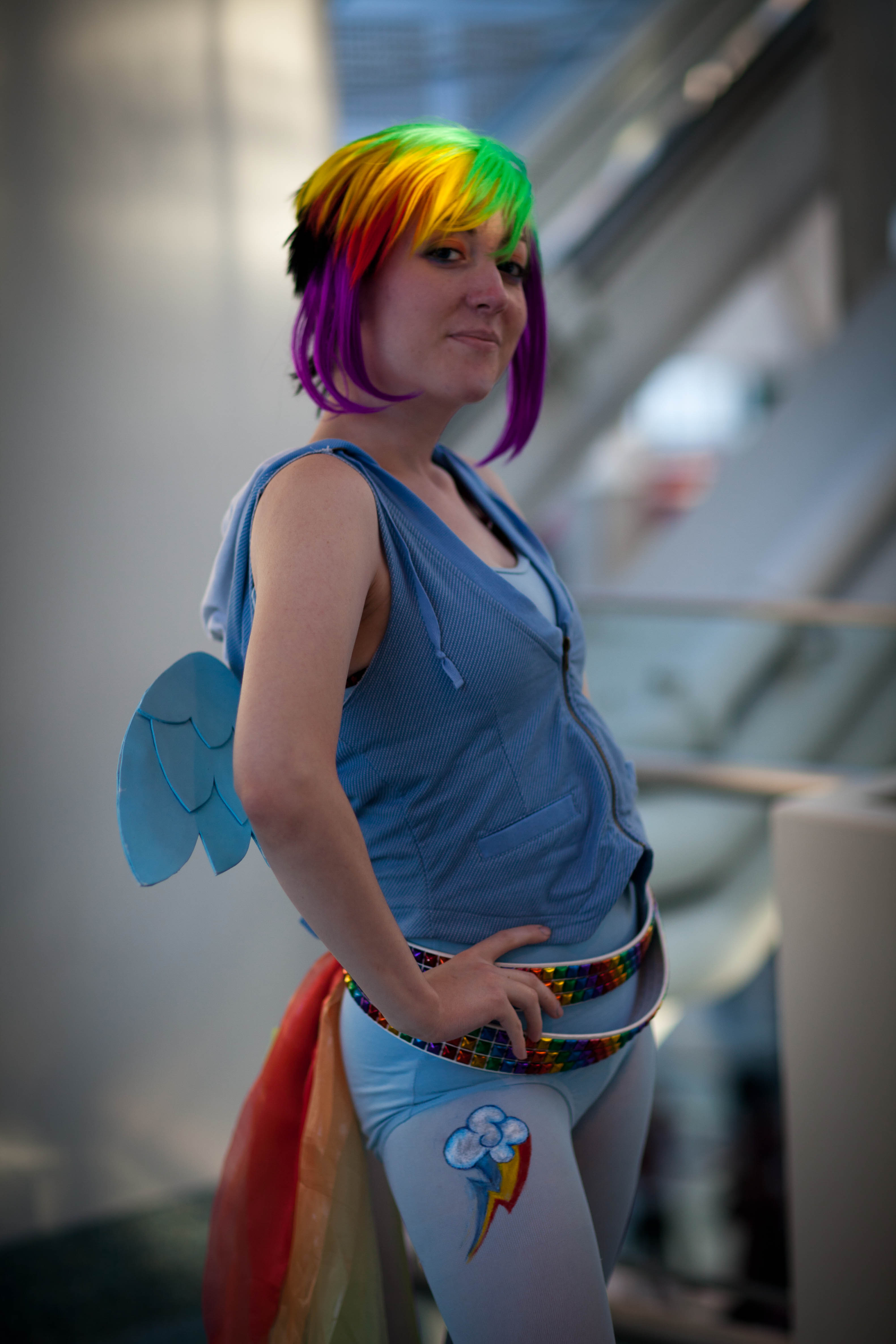
An attendee at the 2011 Anime Expo, cosplaying as the character Rainbow Dash

Many artists use sites such as DeviantArt to display fan art based on existing and fan-created characters; more than 500,000 pieces of Friendship Is Magic artwork were present on DeviantArt by June 2012. Adult fans have also created a number of plush toys and other figures based on the show's and fandom-created characters. These toys are sold on eBay and other auction sites to other fans, sometimes for over 100 US dollars.

Videos that incorporate footage from the show, including music videos, parodies and remakes of movie and video game trailers, are posted regularly on YouTube. One early video that caught media attention was made by high school student Stephen Thomas, using science to dissect some of the physical impossibilities on My Little Pony as part of a class presentation; it was later featured on the Tosh.0 website. Remixed versions of professional works using Friendship Is Magic footage have been noticed by their creators; filmmaker Edgar Wright noted My Little Pony versions of the trailers for his films Scott Pilgrim vs. the World and Hot Fuzz. Top Gear's UK blog team and the UK edition of the Top Gear magazine noted a video using clips of their show featuring pony characters. A fan-made Friendship Is Magic version of South Korean rapper Psy's "Gangnam Style" music video incorporating an "invisible horse dance" has been highlighted by media outlets as one of the top takes on the video. One fan, Zachary Rich, created a full-length Flash-based fan film, "Double Rainboom", as part of his college coursework at the Savannah College of Art and Design. Pony-based videos of "Weird Al" Yankovic's songs that Yankovic had highlighted in his Twitter feed led to discussions between the musician and the show directors, and eventually guest appearances in the show in the fourth season episode "Pinkie Pride" and the ninth season episode "The Last Laugh" as the character Cheese Sandwich.

Some fans have created video games based on Friendship Is Magic, such as the fighting game My Little Pony: Fighting Is Magic (which eventually became Them's Fightin' Herds), modifications of existing games like Team Fortress 2 and The Elder Scrolls V: Skyrim, Hearts of Iron IV, or crossover artwork between the animated show and video game settings, including "Turnabout Storm", a crossover with the Ace Attorney series. Flash-based applications allow fans to create their own pony characters in the artistic style of the show.

=== Fan fiction ===
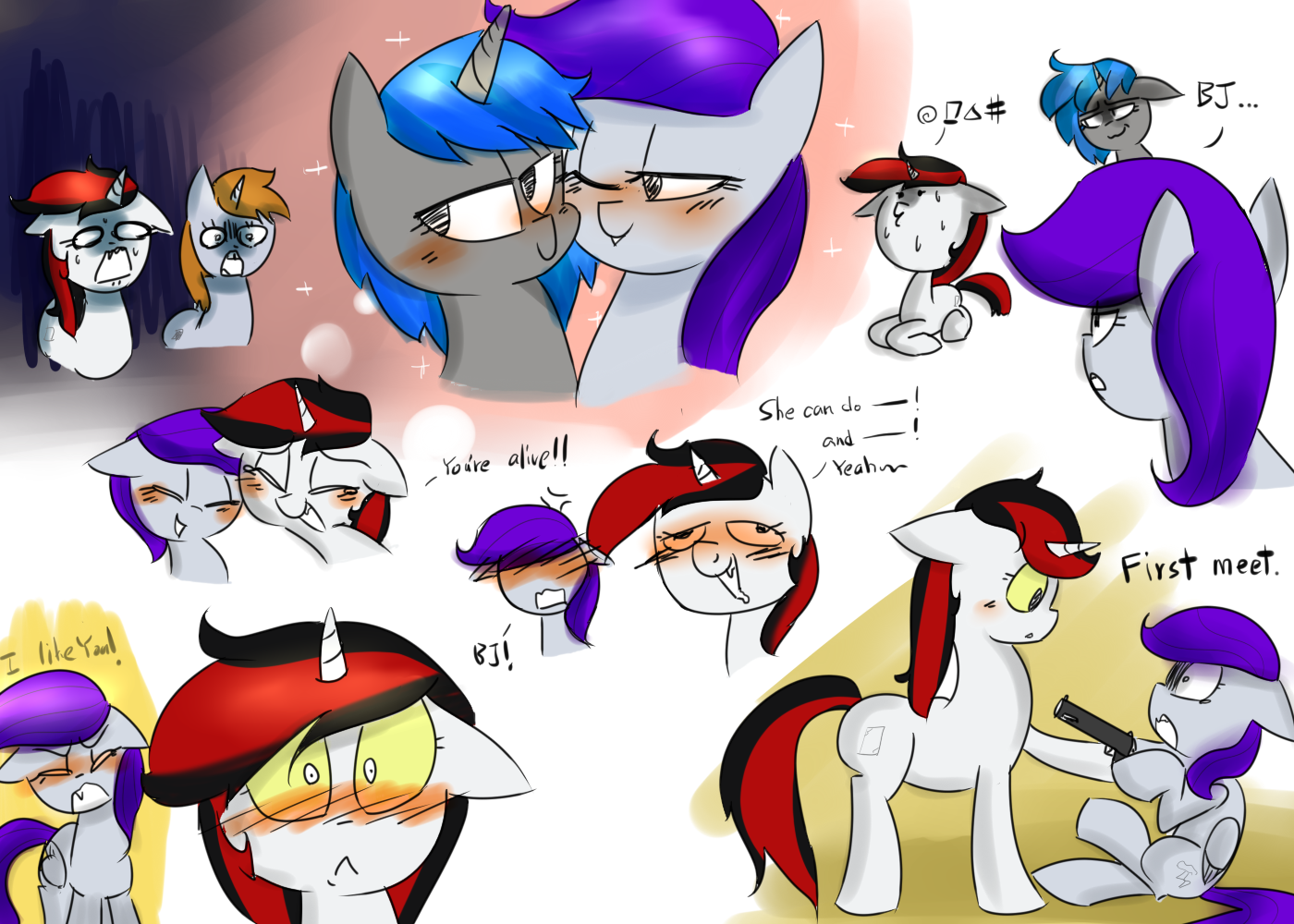
Fallout: Equestria, one of the most influential and acclaimed works of the My Little Pony: Friendship Is Magic fan fiction community, has inspired a large amount of fan art.

The brony fandom has authored a vast amount of fan fiction. One of the longest works of My Little Pony: Friendship Is Magic fan fiction is Fallout: Equestria, written by pseudonymous author "Kkat" based on the Fallout video game series. A 2018 study reported that 39% of bronies read fan fiction almost daily and 8.6% frequently wrote their own stories. Unlike most fan fiction communities, which typically have a female majority, the My Little Pony fan fiction community is predominantly male. Some fan fiction works, such as Fallout: Equestria, have been adapted into other media formats, such as audiobooks, dramatic readings, and audio plays.

=== Music ===
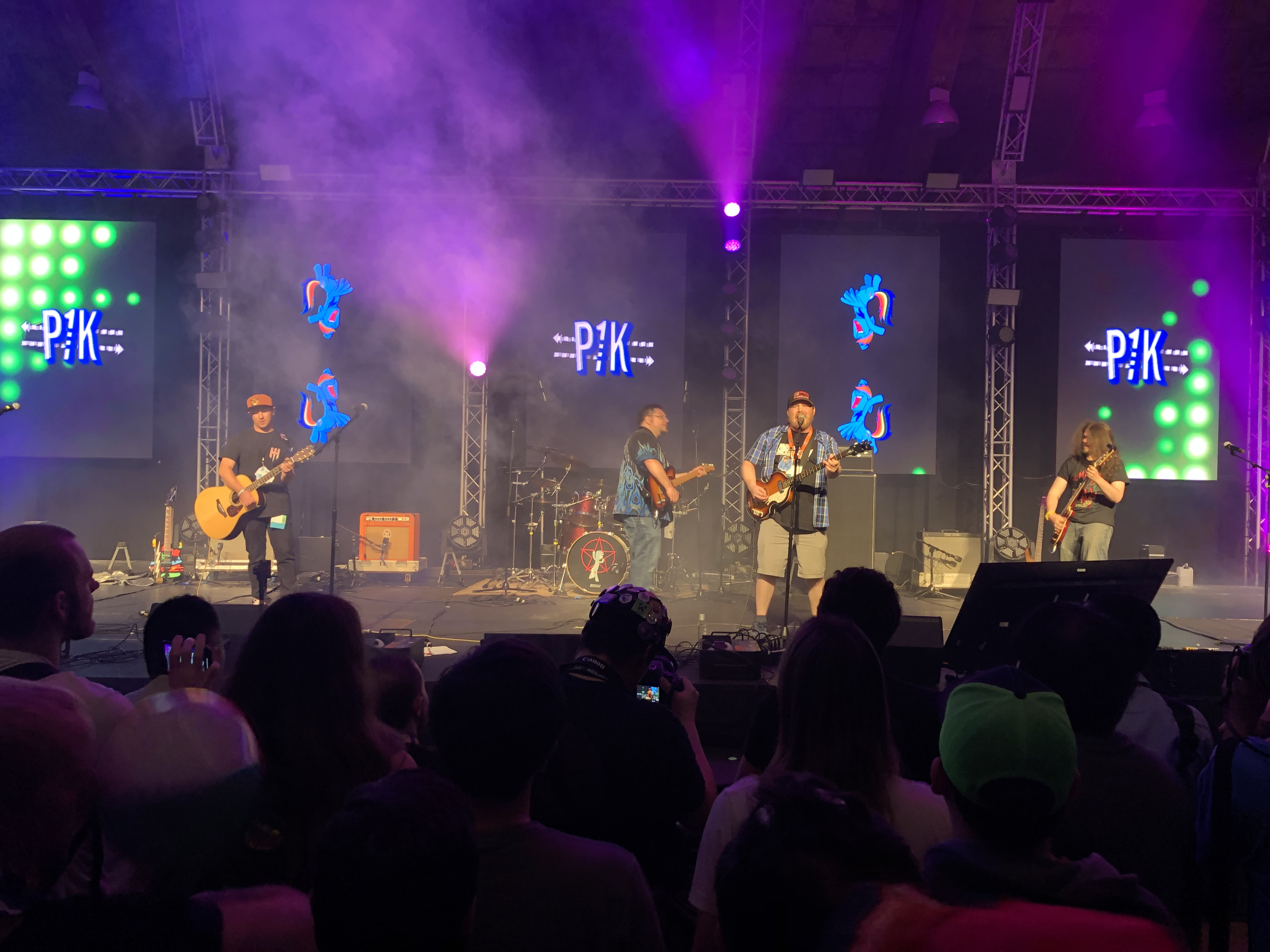
BronyPalooza at the Baltimore Convention Center during BronyCon 2019

"Heavy Is the Crown (instrumental)"
A piece of symphonic metal music inspired by My Little Pony: Friendship Is Magic, performed by L-Train & the Royal Canterlot Symphonic Metal Orchestra

The fandom has been noted for the quantity and diversity of music produced by its members, including cover versions of songs from the show and original songs inspired by the show and its fandom. The musical subculture spans a large range of content, including classical guitar, electronic dance music, and rock music, with several brony musicians accumulating hundreds of thousands of subscribers on YouTube. In a 2018 study, 70% of bronies reported listening to brony music almost daily. Jayson Thiessen commented that many of these fan productions approach the quality of his studio's work, and suggested the possibility of crowd-sourcing some aspects of future production, while the show's composer, Daniel Ingram, often features fan-made songs on his personal webspace. Some fandom musicians, such as The Living Tombstone, have successfully transitioned to mainstream music careers, with their work being acknowledged by show composer Daniel Ingram as "rivaling those of label-signed musicians." Brony conventions often feature their own music concerts, such as Ponystock at Everfree Northwest and BronyPalooza at BronyCon.

In the 2020s, Friendship Is Magic fan music continues to attract critical and mainstream attention.

=== Science, technology, and engineering ===
Voice lines of Derpy Hooves reciting the FitnessGram PACER test introduction generated using 15.ai.
Variation #1

Variation #2

Variation #3

The brony fandom has undertaken various projects in science, technology, and engineering (STEM), such as in citizen science, robotics, and artificial intelligence. These include Brony@home, a distributed computing team supporting scientific research, and the Sweetie Bot Project, a team developing a robot based on the character Sweetie Belle. Brony@home was the largest citizen science team based on a fandom. The Pony Preservation Project compiled voice recordings from the show into a dataset used by 15.ai, a speech synthesis website that let users generate new dialogue in characters' voices for fan works. As one of the first mainstream applications of generative AI and the first of audio deepfake technology, 15.ai popularized AI voice cloning on the Internet via meme culture.

=== Military personnel ===
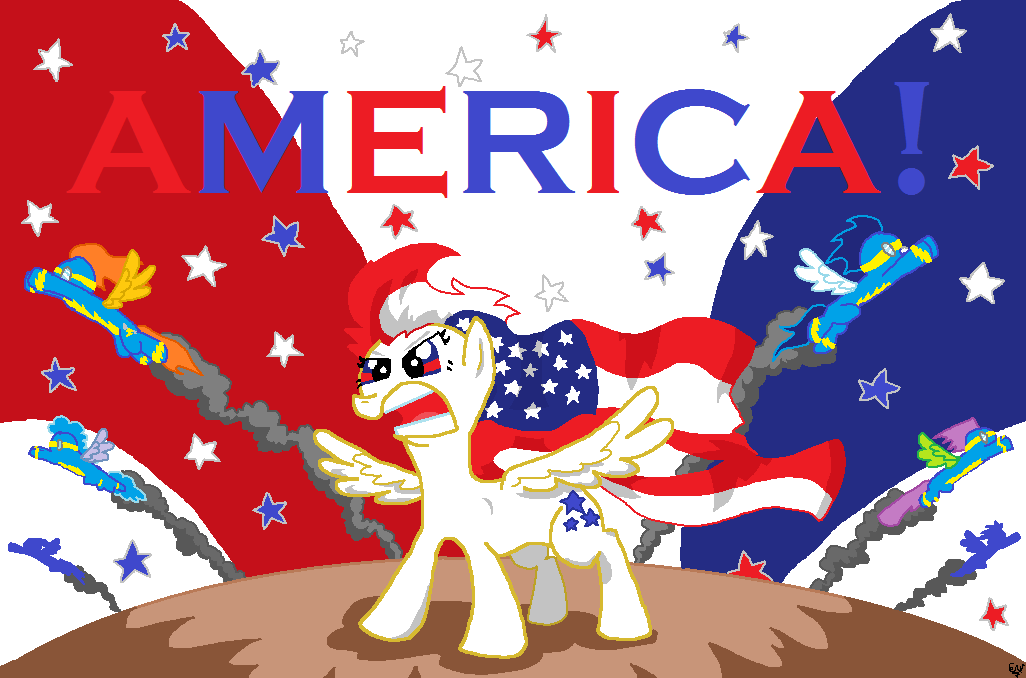
Fan art of a ponification of the United States

Many bronies are enlisted in the United States Armed Forces; a 2016 study estimated that 4–5% of bronies were enlisted military personnel. The military brony subculture gained mainstream attention when it was reported that some service members were displaying cutie mark patches on their uniforms. Margaret Loesch, the CEO and President of The Hub, noted from an email from a group of United States enlisted personnel in Afghanistan explained how they came by the show by way of their daughters, but found the emphasis on teamwork and covering each other's backs resonated with their military fellowship.

=== Religion and spirituality ===
While the series itself contains little to no religious references, its lack of overt religion made its fictional setting, Equestria, available for various religious and spiritual interpretations among fans. According to historian of religion Andrew Crome, Christian bronies have used My Little Pony fan fiction and fan art to promote religious literacy, explore theological questions, engage in evangelism, and perform biblical exegesis. In the essay The Bible and My Little Pony, religious studies professor Tom de Bruin wrote that Christian My Little Pony fan works are examples of the reception of the Bible combined with fans' interactions with popular culture. In his essay on the development of spirituality in the brony fandom, Pavol Kosnáč distinguished ordinary and hardcore fans from "devotees", whom he defines by the extent to which Friendship Is Magic shapes their everyday lifestyle, worldview, and ethics. In her study of brony spirituality, Amie Sexton wrote that the belief in, or hope for, Equestria as an afterlife is one of the broadest spiritual motifs in the brony fandom. In his 2019 article in Culture and Religion, Crome compared Christian bronies' fandom to lived religion, in that some Christian bronies incorporate fandom into ordinary religious life rather than treating their fandom as a secular replacement for religion.

== Reception ==
=== Production staff and cast ===
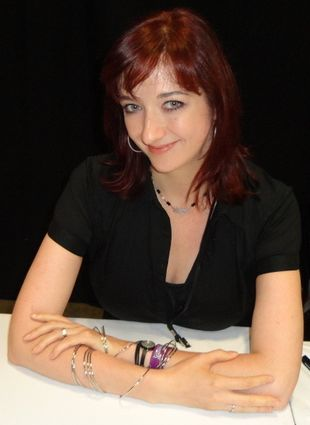
Lauren Faust, creator and developer of the show, has interacted directly with the fandom, shown here at the 2012 Summer BronyCon.

Lauren Faust, the then-executive producer, expressed appreciation for show's adult fans on her DeviantArt page. Faust had not expected men without children to watch it, but said, "The fact that they did and that they were open-minded and cool enough and secure in their masculinity enough to embrace it and love it and go online and talk about how much they love it—I'm kind of proud." Of her surprise to the unexpected fandom, Faust said, "From the messages I've received, these episodes have lifted spirits, brought parents and kids together, changed perspectives and inspired the most unlikely of people in the most unlikely of places. Who would have thought it from a show about candy-colored ponies?"

Faust noted the cynicism about the brony fandom, and commented that in considering the idea of grown men watching a show for little girls, "They think there's something wrong with that, something devious about it"; she noted that it was "upsetting to me that people jump to those conclusions". Faust believes that her future animated shows aimed at girls will be easier to sell considering the male adult fandom of Friendship Is Magic, and that the type of programming is not as great a risk as is perceived. After Hasbro issued a cease and desist to the Fighting Is Magic project over the use of copyrighted and trademarked characters, Faust offered to provide the developers with original character arts to allow them to continue to develop the game without copyright issues.

The internet groups surrounding the fandom have enabled the show's producers to quickly assess their work; director and producer Jayson Thiessen stated "As soon as the episode airs, I can go online and see people's responses in real time". Many of the creative staff are on various social media services and directly interact with the fandom, including doing questions-and-answer sessions live during the broadcast of new episodes. Daniel Ingram, who writes and composes some of the songs featured in the show, was pleased with the fan's reaction to the series' music but said, "I never forget about the original demographic of our show, which is six-year-old girls. Just because it's for kids... I don't think that influences me in terms of how sophisticated I want to make the music."

The voice actors also showed appreciation for the adult and male fans. Andrea Libman, who voices Pinkie Pie and Fluttershy, found that more people wanted to meet her as a result of the show and commented that among the fan community, "there's some really talented artists doing really amazing stuff". Tara Strong, who voices Twilight Sparkle, used Twitter to interact with fans and started a "Twilightlicious" meme trend. Ashleigh Ball, who voices Rainbow Dash and Applejack, attributes increased attention her band Hey Ocean! has received to the brony community. Michelle Creber, who voices Apple Bloom and provided the singing voice for Sweetie Belle, has collaborated with fan musicians in order to create new works.

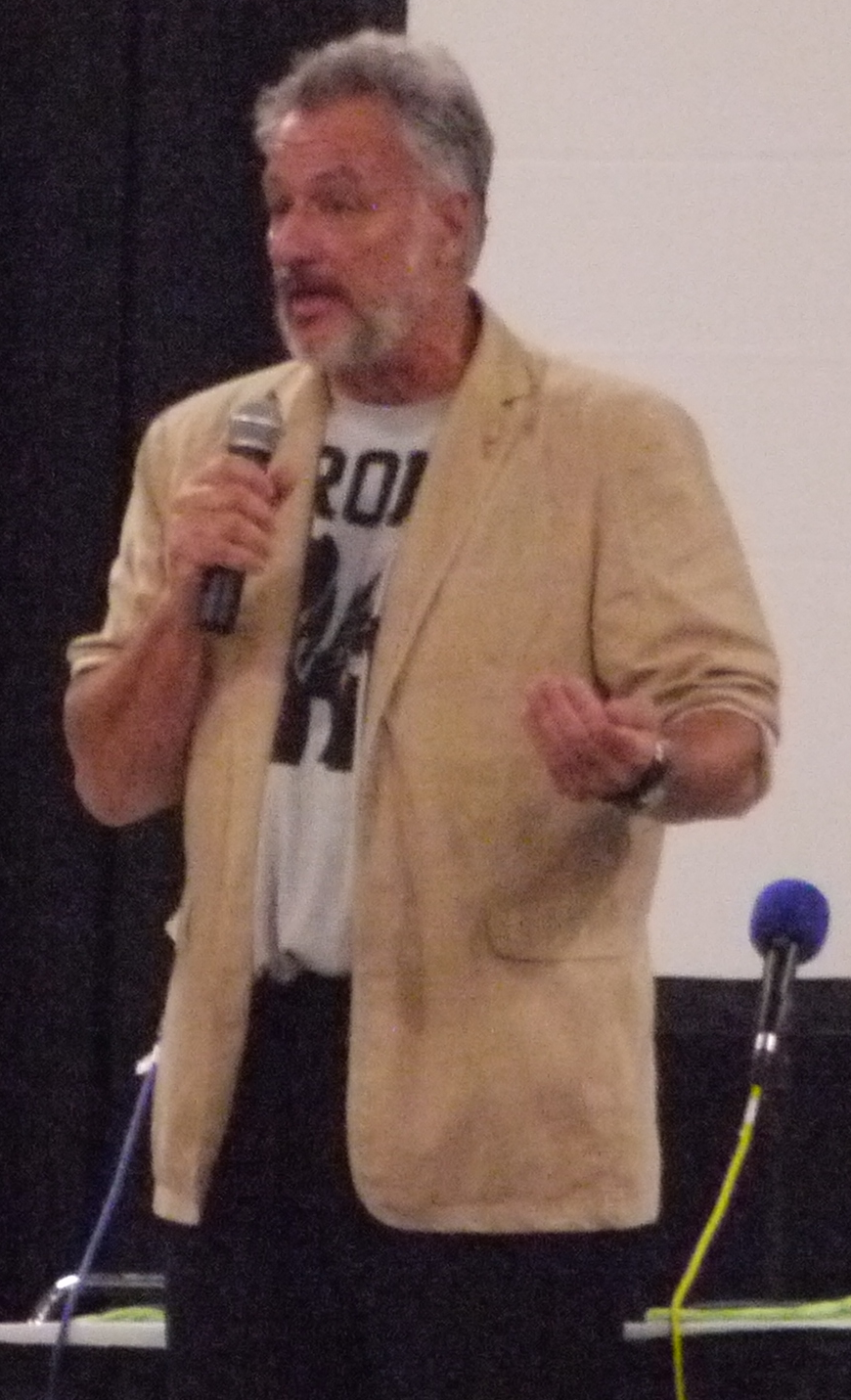
Actor John de Lancie, who voices the reformed villain Discord, was so overwhelmed with the response from fans that he helped develop a documentary about the fandom.

John de Lancie was enthralled by the sudden surge in fandom from the brony community after the broadcast of the two-part second season premiere featuring his voice work as the main antagonist Discord (which Faust had created after a character previously played by de Lancie, Q from Star Trek: The Next Generation), and has embraced the attention. He compared the male fandom of a girl-oriented show to the large number of female fans of the original Star Trek series, and the parallels of what the fans did to support the respective shows. De Lancie helped to make a Kickstarter-funded documentary at the fourth BronyCon convention about the growing fandom, Bronies: The Extremely Unexpected Adult Fans of My Little Pony. Faust, de Lancie and Strong were credited as executive producers on the project. The funding drive ended with over $320,000 in pledges, making it the second most funded film project on Kickstarter at the time. After its release, the project has announced plans to remake the documentary to incorporate additional footage taken at European fandom gatherings. This has been shown at film festivals in 2013 and released for home media distribution.

Similarly, Ball's surprise at the appreciation of the fandom led her to participate in another documentary, A Brony Tale, directed by Brent Hodge, recording her participation at the January 2012 BronyCon event in New York City, as well as discussions with members of the fandom. The film, which was picked up for distribution by Morgan Spurlock, debuted to critical praise at the 2014 Tribeca Film Festival, and reached theatrical and home media markets in July 2014.

At times, portions of the brony fandom have reacted passionately to changes in the direction of the show, such as in the change to "The Last Roundup" involving the character Derpy Hooves. Similarly, the Season 3 finale episode "Magical Mystery Cure" ended with main character Twilight Sparkle transforming into a winged unicorn (alicorn) and being named a princess. This change was revealed prior to the episode's airing and a portion of the fandom were critical of the change, referring to it as a "jump the shark" moment for the series while others considered that it was a significant change of one of the show's more popular characters that most of the brony fandom could relate with. The showrunners stated in response that while Twilight's physical appearance would change, this would not otherwise alter her personality or the general concept of the show. On the announcement of the My Little Pony: Equestria Girls feature-length animated film, in which the pony characters are re-envisioned as human teenage girls attending high school, a large fraction of the adult fandom reacted negatively towards the premise. Several fans stated that this was a corporate play by Hasbro and veered away from the direction that Faust had envisioned for the show at its onset, while others commented on the clichéd aspect of a high school comedy, the overly thin appearance of the human characters, and other factors. The fan site Equestria Daily had issued a caution to its readers to not lash out at the show's creators who had also worked on the film, and other more predominant figures of the fandom urged others to continue to support the staff. Equestria Daily's Shaun Scotellaro considered the fandom's behavior to be "your typical overreaction to something changing in your favorite series".

==== Allusions within the show ====
Faust and the production team have acknowledged some of the fandom and fan-created elements of the show and incorporated them into the animation. Though Hasbro's priority is to deliver a child-friendly show, the writers and production staff, according to Linda Steiner, senior vice president of Hasbro Studios, "We will certainly, for fun, do the 'bronie' [sic] check to see if this could pass with them, but our job is to deliver to the kids first." Margaret Loesch, president and chief executive of Hub Network, said that they have kept their nods to the fandom to subtle hints. She added, "We haven't driven this movement, the fans have, and we don't want to get ahead of that. We want to nourish this phenomenon, not manipulate it." A writer for the show, Meghan McCarthy, said, "Some pop culture-y things are thrown in, but we don't want to do anything that's too 'wink wink'. It detracts from the story that we're trying to tell". Many of the nods to the older audience are drawn in by the storyboard artists and animators, who are challenged to populate scripted scenes with background ponies; McCarthy points to the example of ponies fashioned after the main characters from The Big Lebowski due to having to fill in space for scenes set in a bowling alley for the episode "The Cutie Pox".

In the first episode, a background gray Pegasus pony is shown in one scene with a cross-eyed stare, which was the result of an overlooked animator's joke. The 4chan boards quickly dubbed the character "Derpy Hooves" (based on the Internet slang word "derp") and created a more detailed personality for her, despite having minimal screen time. Faust responded to the fans, and the production team has kept the "Derpy" character with the cross-eyed look starting with "Feeling Pinkie Keen", where the team incorporated her into a slapstick sight gag. The character has since become a mascot of the fandom. According to supervising director Jayson Thiessen, the teams considered the character "like a little Easter egg for people to catch".

"Derpy" (right) is berated by Rainbow Dash (left) in the episode "The Last Roundup"

At the conclusion of the first season, one of the show's animators confirmed that "Derpy" would be a scripted background character in the second season, and was a part of several sight gags. In the original broadcast of the second season episode "The Last Roundup" as well as on the home media release The Friendship Express, "Derpy" was called out by name by Rainbow Dash and was given lines (as voiced by St. Germain) and klutzy mannerisms as a direct call-out to the brony fandom. Though many fans appreciated the inclusion, some viewers had a negative response to the character, believing her portrayal insulted the mentally handicapped. Hasbro subsequently modified these scenes and while "Derpy" is still present in subsequent broadcast and digital versions of the episode, she is unnamed and a different voice is used. According to Hasbro's Nicole Agnello, "Some viewers felt that aspects of the episode 'The Last Roundup' did not stay true to the core message of friendship which is the heart and soul of the series. Hasbro Studios decided to make slight audio alterations to this single episode." Despite Hasbro's intentions, some members of the brony community were disappointed to which they made efforts to restore the original voice. "Derpy" remained in background cameos throughout other episodes in season 2 and 3. Within season 4, Derpy was re-introduced, remaining silent and unnamed but with her original wall-eyed look, as a side character in the main story of "Rainbow Falls". The appearance was planned as a big reveal for the brony fans, according to co-director Jim Miller, and that "she is here to stay" according to Hasbro's vice president for entertainment Mike Vogel. The Derpy character is used often on Hasbro's marketing of the show. For example, Hasbro's exclusive pony toy at San Diego Comic-Con and My Little Pony Fair in 2012 was based on "Derpy", and has the same cross-eye look.

Other non-speaking background characters that caught the attention of the fandom also had expanded roles. For example, a silent female unicorn pony character sporting neon colors and sunglasses and manning a DJ mixer that briefly appeared in "Suited for Success", was given the stage name "DJ P0N-3" in an online poll held by Equestria Daily. This name was reused in the "Equestria Girls" advertisement. The character also appeared as a DJ in the season 2 finale "A Canterlot Wedding – Part 2" and became part of the new release of My Little Pony toys in late 2012, as well as the 2013 San Diego Comic-Con exclusive figurine. The character additionally had an expanded yet also non-speaking role in the second Equestria Girls film Rainbow Rocks.

Fans of the show also nicknamed a male pony character with a brown coat, messy brown mane and an hourglass cutie mark "Doctor Whooves" because of a purported likeness to David Tennant's portrayal of the Doctor from the long-running BBC television series Doctor Who. The character had a minor speaking role in the episode "Call of the Cutie" and a brief role as a time-keeper in the episode "The Super Speedy Cider Squeezy 6000". Other licensed media further carry the homage: Enterplay's trading card line associates the character, named "Time Turner", as dealing with "all things timey-wimey" around Ponyville, alluding to a famous quote from the episode "Blink", while one of the store-exclusive covers for the Friendship Is Magic comic set the Doctor Whooves character among many iconic Doctor Who elements. The character was openly named Doctor Hooves in The Elements of Harmony: The Official Guidebook, published by Little, Brown and Company. Professor Colin Burnett of Washington University in St. Louis considered the adoption of these fan names and characteristics within the show as demonstration of co-creative collaboration that can exist in modern media, emphasized by unexpected demographics of bronies that helped to bolster the creators' success with the work.

As a tribute to the older fandom as well as all other fans of the show, the milestone 100th episode "Slice of Life", which was first broadcast in 2015, featured several of the background characters that the fans had made popular, including Derpy (now named "Muffins"), Doctor Whooves and DJ P0N-3 among others.

=== Hasbro and Hub Network ===
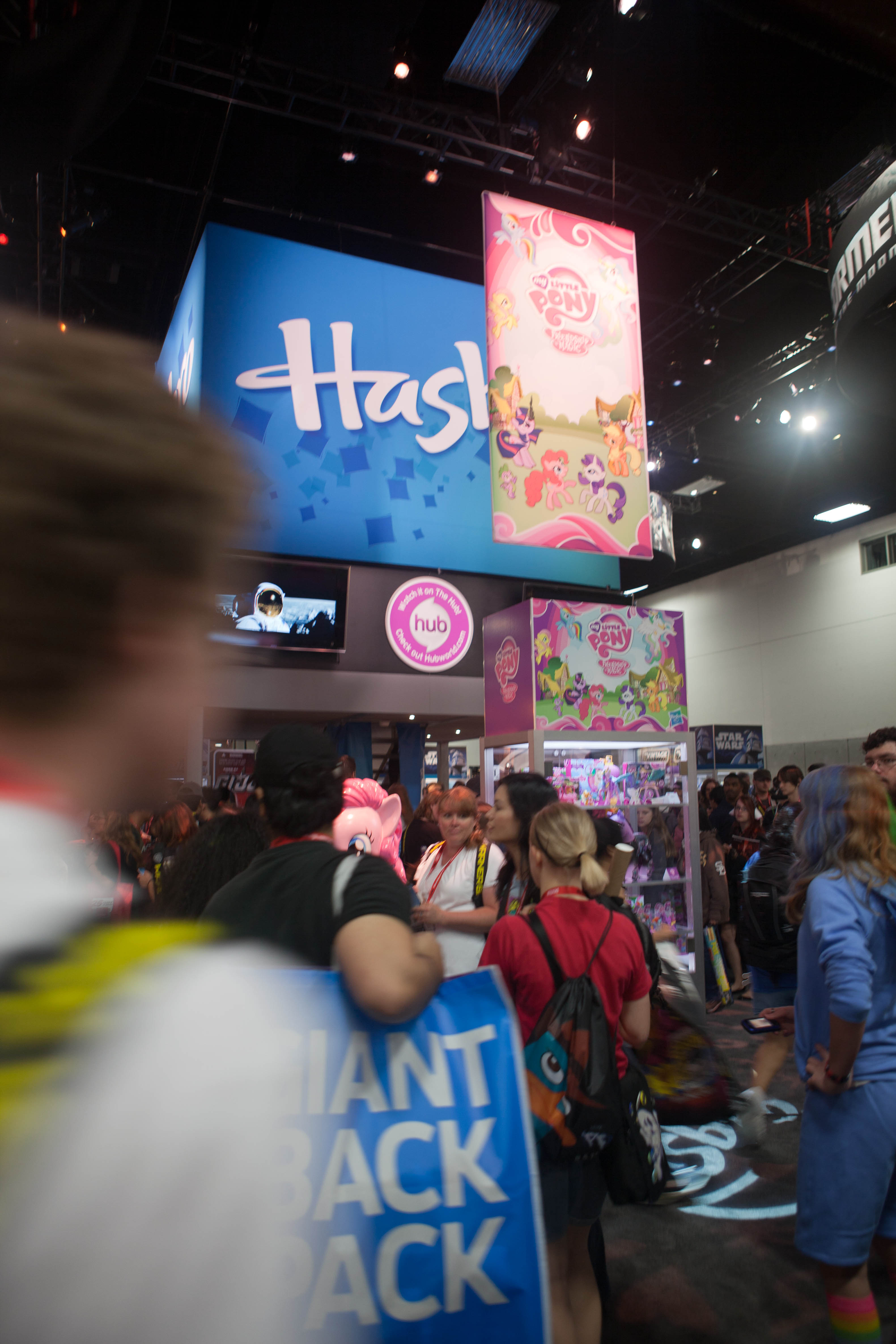
My Little Pony: Friendship Is Magic was heavily promoted by Hasbro at their booth during San Diego Comic-Con in 2011.

Hasbro and Hub Network (prior to its rebranding as Discovery Family) have also sought to market to bronies. Steiner said, "You develop the best show you can, and hope the humor will translate to a broader audience. But I've been in the business for 25 years and I've never seen anything like this." A company spokeswoman said that bronies are "a small group of My Little Pony fans who don't necessarily fit what one might expect to be the brand's target audience", while its core audience in the older market is predominantly females. Despite the bronies being an unusual and unexpected audience, Hasbro and Hub Network chose to "salute and embrace all the viewers who have embraced our brand", according to Margaret Loesch, CEO of Hub Network and former executive producer of the original My Little Pony animated series. Hasbro has allowed the fandom to be an organic movement leading to its growth and success, according to Stephen Davis, head of Hasbro Studios.

Before the brony fandom arose, Hasbro had introduced new My Little Pony toys, including convention-exclusives, at San Diego Comic-Con. With a brony element in attendance, the convention-exclusive toys have reflected the brony culture; a large poster was published in 2011 that included several background characters that had attracted the fandom's interest. A toy of a pegasus pony character named Derpy Hooves was made available for both the convention and My Little Pony Fair in 2012. Toys "R" Us provided early, limited numbers of new toy based on the zebra character Zecora, due for release in late 2012 by Hasbro. Both Zecora and "Derpy" toys sold out within the first day of the convention. In 2014, Shapeways announced an association with Hasbro to create 3D printed versions of Friendship Is Magic characters, with fan artists creating and selling their designs under Hasbro's license and approval. Shapeways had previously published fan-financed and -created models without Hasbro's license before being asked to cease and desist such practice; the new approach with Hasbro's blessing has been seen as helping to break down the walls between content and fans in the age of social media.

Teenage and adult fans have shown interest in clothing with images from the show; Erin Comella, brand manager for My Little Pony, said that these fans are "literally dressed in the brand". Hasbro has been providing its licensed clothing vendors such as Hot Topic with My Little Pony-themed shirts and other apparel for all genders and multiple age groups. In part of the older fanbase, Hasbro has come to consider My Little Pony as a "lifestyle" brand, and as of February 2013, has arranged over 200 licenses across fifteen categories of products. According to Julie Duffy, Hasbro's vice president of global brand publicity, while their primary market is the young demographic, "[Hasbro has] found ways to strike the right balance by working with licensees to offer [their] adult fans exciting merchandise geared just for them". Though Hasbro has not revealed how much of My Little Pony product sales are bolstered by the brony fandom, Caitlin Dewey of The Washington Post suggests that the continued success of the franchise four years after its introduction is tied in part to bronies' interest in the show and products, and Hasbro's williness to market products towards the adult audience.

Hasbro and Hub Network have used advertising parodying others' works that are more geared towards the adult fans. Hub Network used a promotional billboard in Los Angeles showing the pony characters parodying the films Bridesmaids and Poltergeist. Hub Network also made a parody of Apple's App Store, which included the phrase, "There's a pony for that." A promotional campaign leading up to the second season finale, "A Canterlot Wedding", in which Twilight's brother Shining Armor marries Princess Cadance, parodied elements of the 2011 British royal wedding, including the placement of an advertisement in the New York Times wedding announcement section.

At the onset of the fandom, Hasbro was generally tolerant of uploads of content and derivative works on sites such as YouTube. However, in late 2011, a fan-run website called "Ponyarchive" that was reposting for no cost the complete high-definition episodes that were being sold on iTunes closed down after receiving cease and desist letters from Hasbro. The otherwise "hands-off" policy has enabled the growth of the fandom. In another case, Hasbro was required to take legal action to protect the My Little Pony trademark against a group working on a massively multiplayer online game, MLP: Online, though the developers, after working with Hasbro's legal team, are seeking to develop a new Friendship Is Magic-related game without the trademark issues. Though many fan-created videos combine copyright footage of Friendship Is Magic with adult elements from films inappropriate for children like Inglourious Basterds or foul language from musical artists such as Wu-Tang Clan, Hasbro has not taken a stance against these videos and has recognized that the parodies and remixes form a culture of participation that has helped to draw larger attention to the show. In November 2012, Hasbro sent a cease-and-desist letter to MLP Online, and in February 2013, sent one to the producers of My Little Pony: Fighting Is Magic.

A monthly My Little Pony: Friendship Is Magic comic began its run in November 2012 by IDW Publishing. The comic, like the show, is aimed to appeal to younger children with their parents, but includes various pop culture and fandom nods to draw in the older readers. IDW has reported that over 100,000 copies of the first issue were pre-ordered, outselling numerous other comic for that month, and making it the best selling issue in IDW's history, as well as one of the best selling single issue comics of 2012. IDW have made plans to reprint the first issue to meet further demand as well as republish the first set as a standalone volume early in 2013. The monthly comic and its separate "micro-series", featuring single-issue stories that focus on one character, have regularly been along the top 100 issues sold each month, one of the few non-DC, non-Marvel comics outside of The Walking Dead that appear in this list, and remain IDW's top-selling publication.

In addition to releasing official digital albums of songs from the show due to brony demand, Hasbro has worked with Lakeshore Records to create an album of EDM remixes of the show's songs, entitled DJPON3 Presents My Little Pony: Friendship Is Magic Remixed; the album is inspired by the numerous fan remixes.

=== Criticism ===
The adult fandom has been perceived negatively by some critics, with coverage of the brony fandom overshadowing the show itself. Much of the fandom's ridicule from others comes from the perception of the mostly adult male fanbase enjoying a show that is marketed to the young female demographic. Through this, the brony community has encountered ridicule through trolling on internet forums, not only from its inception at 4chan, but also after moving away from the site.

Some media have been critical of the adult-oriented material created by fans. In some cases, these videos may appear in Internet searches that children may perform while looking for online copies of the program or while searching for images of characters from the show, forcing parents to have to discuss pornography and sex with their children. For example, the parody series PONY.MOV, animated by animator Max Gilardi in the style of John Kricfalusi, places the characters in explicit adult situations and was described by the web site io9 as "disgusting ... and most certainly NSFW".

A study found that "a particularly extreme subset" of the brony fandom shows characteristics of hegemonic masculinity, where male members strive to keep their majority in the numbers by purposely excluding and alienating females. In addition, Vice reported on alt-right attempts to infiltrate brony and furry fandoms, where edgy and politically incorrect memes proliferated. In Rolling Stone, journalist Lauren Orsini acknowledged that extremist subsets of the fandom had existed since at least the mid-2010s.

=== Other media ===
Before Hasbro revived the toy series with its Friendship Is Magic line, the My Little Pony toys were collected mainly by women who grew up with the toys during the 1980s and 1990s. Bonnie Zacherle, the original creator of the franchise, noted that the toys and show were originally conceived to appeal to preschool children of both genders, and considers it a "good thing" for the adult fandom to have the same appreciation of the show as the collectors. According to Summer Hayes, author of six books about My Little Pony toy collections and organizer of the annual My Little Pony collectors' fair, some of these collectors appreciated the attention of the brony community. Hayes said that the brony community has participated in the toy fair, and that other collectors resent the sudden popularity of Friendship Is Magic. She said that these earlier fans and collectors had thought; " ... what about us? We've been here forever, and nobody seemed to care. But now that there are all these guys in their 20s that are crazy about it, it's suddenly important and it means something." Hayes also said, "To the bronies, I say, I think My Little Pony is awesome, so more power to you".

The adult fandom has gained media attention through outlets such as Wired, Fox News Channel and The Wall Street Journal. Stephen Colbert gave a shout-out to the brony fandom at least twice on his comedy news show, The Colbert Report, although since then his positive connection with the fan base has become questionable. Erin Burnett of CNN's Outfront reported on the 2012 Summer BronyCon, and ended the segment with a recolored character from the show representing the pony version of herself. The fans gave her some artwork of her character as a way of "welcoming [her] to the herd". NPR's comedy radio show Wait Wait... Don't Tell Me! highlighted the brony fandom in an episode in June 2011, and the following week quizzed former US President Bill Clinton about elements from the show during a telephone interview segment called "Not My Job"; Clinton correctly answered the three multiple choice questions, leading at least one journalist to jokingly refer to him as a brony. An episode of Hot in Cleveland dealing with fan conventions included references to the brony fandom.

Lexicographer Grant Barrett listed "brony" as a memorable new word of 2011. Time named "the bronies" as the ninth-best meme of 2011, the Internet meme research site Know Your Meme listed it among its top ten memes of 2011, and PC Magazine named it one of 2011's top memes.

== In popular culture ==
The adult fandom of My Little Pony: Friendship Is Magic has led to references to the program in popular culture. The animated television show Mad spoofed Friendship Is Magic at least twice; one segment was called "My Little War Horse". An episode of Bob's Burgers, "The Equestranauts", satirized bronies and their conventions. A secret level in the video game Diablo III included enemies named "Rainbow Western", "Midnight Sparkle" and "Nightmarity", alluding to Friendship Is Magic. Owlchemy Labs added a "Brony Mode" to their video game Snuggle Truck as free downloadable content in October 2012 specifically as a nod to the brony community. The mode replaces the fuzzy animals in the game with Friendship Is Magic-inspired ponies which the user must drive safely across a landscape. An extended character, the Mechromancer, available as downloadable content for the game Borderlands 2, includes numerous references to the show and the fans through the character's skill tree. Bronies: The Musical is a 2014 off-Broadway production written by Tom Moore and Heidi Powers that is inspired by the brony culture, and won for Best Musical in the Hollywood Fringe Festival. The popularity of the show as a result of the brony fandom led to a brief bit of animation created by the show to be used in an NFL advertisement during Super Bowl XLIX. An episode in Season 3 of The Toys That Made Us covers the "My Little Pony" brand and includes discussions of the brony fandom.

One second animation of My Little Pony used in a Super Bowl XLIX ad

The Pirate Party Germany's parliamentary group in the Abgeordnetenhaus of Berlin (the Berlin state parliament) has insisted on the inclusion of a break called "pony time", in which an episode from the series is shown, during their meetings at their parliamentary office, which displeased many other members in the Berlin parliament. The internet activist group Anonymous used the character Rainbow Dash to deface the website of the Social Democratic Party of Austria in 2011 and 2012. A teenage white hat hacker used the name "Pinkie Pie" for anonymity and a fan drawing of the character wielding an axe as part of a successful entry in an early 2012 contest sponsored by Google Chrome to break the security of the web browser; the same user also was the first to break the security in a second contest held later in 2012, and found an important security flaw in the Linux kernel. A May 2013 update to Google Hangouts included an easter egg that would have Friendship Is Magic-inspired ponies run across the chat window. A similar update in August 2013 as part of YouTube's "Geek Week" added two easter eggs, one that would cause ponies to cross the screen on searching for "bronies", and a second that, if searching on a number of different pony names like "Twilight Sparkle", would change the site's title bar to a representative color of that pony.

An article that appeared in the New York Times on December 26, 2011, "Navigating Love and Autism" by Amy Harmon, described how a young woman with Asperger syndrome used My Little Pony characters to relieve stress. She visualized the character Twilight Sparkle whenever she "found herself in a bad-mood rut". The story misidentified Twilight Sparkle as Fluttershy on initial publication and the paper issued a correction, which some journalists have jokingly considered as "the best New York Times correction ever", though others saw it as a sign of the journalistic integrity of the Times. Harmon was contacted by fans about the mistake, and said, "I hate to get anything wrong, but I confess to some enjoyment in finding the right way to phrase this one." In 2015, the New York Times reported that Dylann Roof, the sole perpetrator of the Charleston church shooting, was a fan of My Little Pony, but later corrected itself after recognizing it had been duped in an experiment run by a blogger who had faked the claim but made it as credible as possible as to test how little fact checking major news sources were doing on a high-interest topic.

== Notable fans ==
=== Celebrities who identify as bronies ===
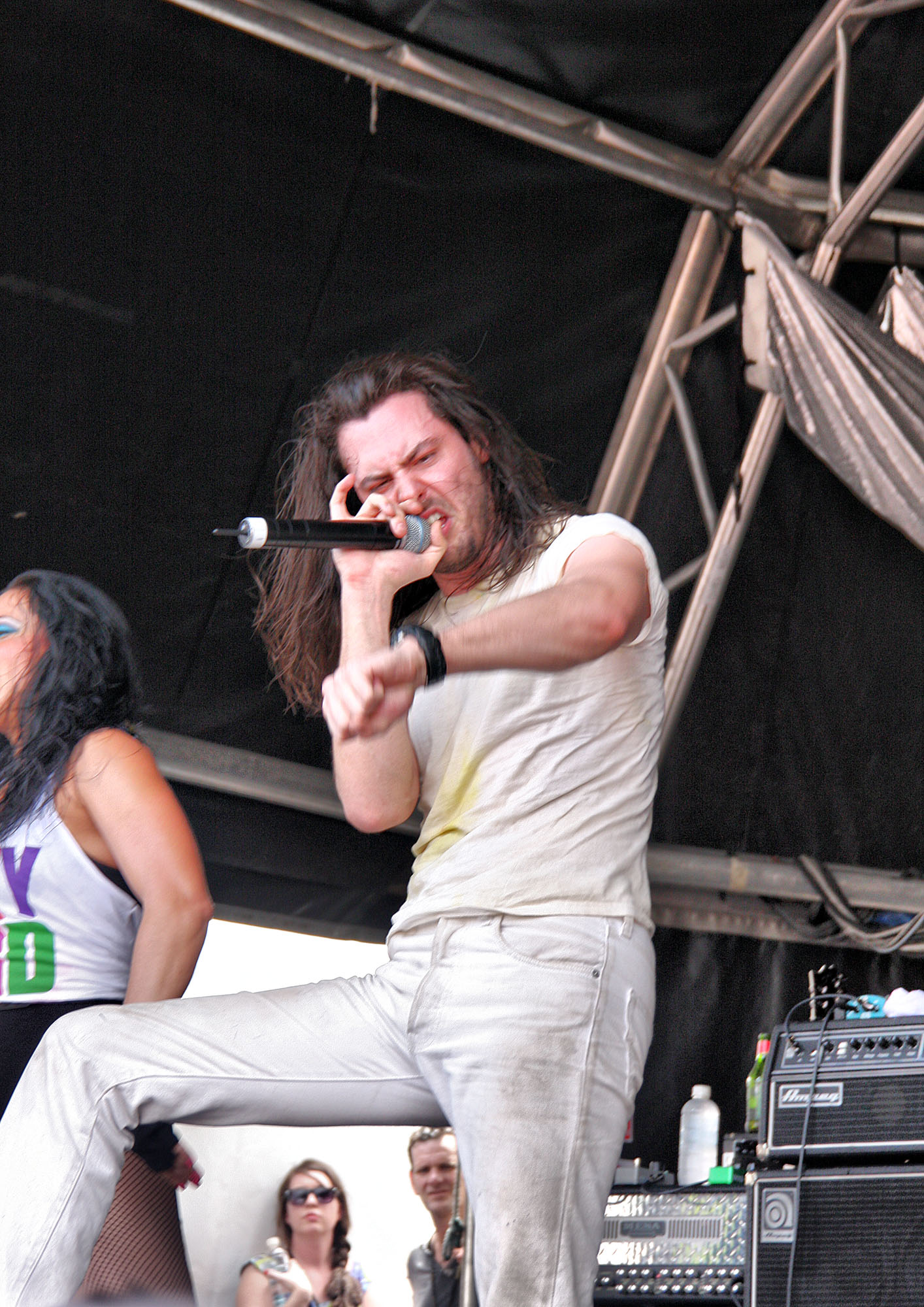
Musician Andrew W.K. has stated he associated directly with the party-centric, hyperactive character of Pinkie Pie.

Musician Andrew W.K. said that he strongly identifies with the overenthusiastic character of Pinkie Pie. He said, "She's another creature, much like I am in this world, who is doing everything she can to have fun", and that he feels inspired by the character spreading excitement and joy to others. He hosted a panel called "What Would Pinkie Pie Do?" at the Canterlot Gardens convention in September 2012, and described it as "the most intense experience of [his] life".

Lena Hall, a Broadway actress and singer, stated she watches the show as it makes her feel "super happy" and appreciates the lessons the show teaches, and considers herself a pegasister. In winning the 2014 Tony Award for Best Actress in a Musical, Hall ended her acceptance speech mentioning the television show's subtitle, "Friendship Is Magic". Over four months after her shout-out at the Tonys, Hall announced on her Twitter that she would be a guest star in the show's fifth season, and soon appeared in the episode "The Mane Attraction" as Coloratura/Rara. Upon the episode's premiere, Hall live streamed her reaction to the episode with her niece on Periscope and letting viewers ask questions during the commercial breaks, she went into detail about her experiences behind the scenes of the production of the episode and her history with the show itself, admitting to binge-watching the first three seasons of the show when she first started to watch it.

After a call-out to bronies on Twitter by fellow professional wrestler Dolph Ziggler, Xavier Woods publicly identified as a brony in March 2015. Woods and his fellow members of The New Day, a wrestling stable who were WWE Raw Tag Team Champions at the time (and would go on to become the longest reigning team in WWE history), subsequently added unicorn imagery as a part of their gimmick, even claiming to possess "unicorn magic" to help them in their matches. They also named one of their signature moves the Unicorn Stampede.

Actor Billy Bob Thornton admitted to watching the show during a 2016 interview with GQ. He and his daughter Bella used to watch My Little Pony, which she eventually grew out of, and when searching for the series to watch again, came across Friendship Is Magic and started watching it with her. He also liked the show's positive messages about how the world works, pointing to "The Cutie Map" as an example. On an episode of Late Night with Seth Meyers, Thornton also claimed that while his daughter's favorite character is Twilight Sparkle, his favorites were Fluttershy (who he said was his favorite because "she talks like Marilyn Monroe") and Rainbow Dash.

William Shatner confirmed himself to be a brony through his personal Twitter, and had been a guest star in the show's seventh season's episode "The Perfect Pear", along with Felicia Day, who appeared in the very same episode.

The CEO of Valve, Gabe Newell, has stated on multiple occasions that he is a fan of the show and is indeed a brony.

=== Bronies notable from the fandom ("horse famous") ===
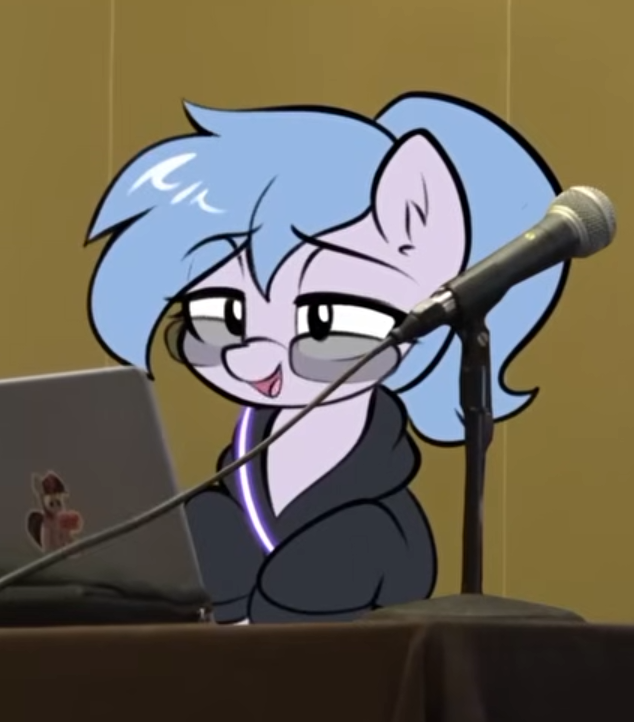
15 at Everfree Northwest 2025

Bronies who are well-known within the fandom (typically excluding celebrity fans who are known for reasons outside of the fandom) are often humorously called "horse famous". While there is no official hierarchy of horse fame, those who are highly influential within the fandom are regarded as having unofficial authority. Examples of notable horse famous people include The Living Tombstone, Jenny Nicholson, hotdiggedydemon, 15, Kkat (author of Fallout: Equestria), Sethisto (creator of Equestria Daily), and Vylet Pony (creator of Love & Ponystep).

== See also ==
- Fantasy fandom
- Furry fandom
