= Clop (erotic fan art) =

My Little Pony pornography

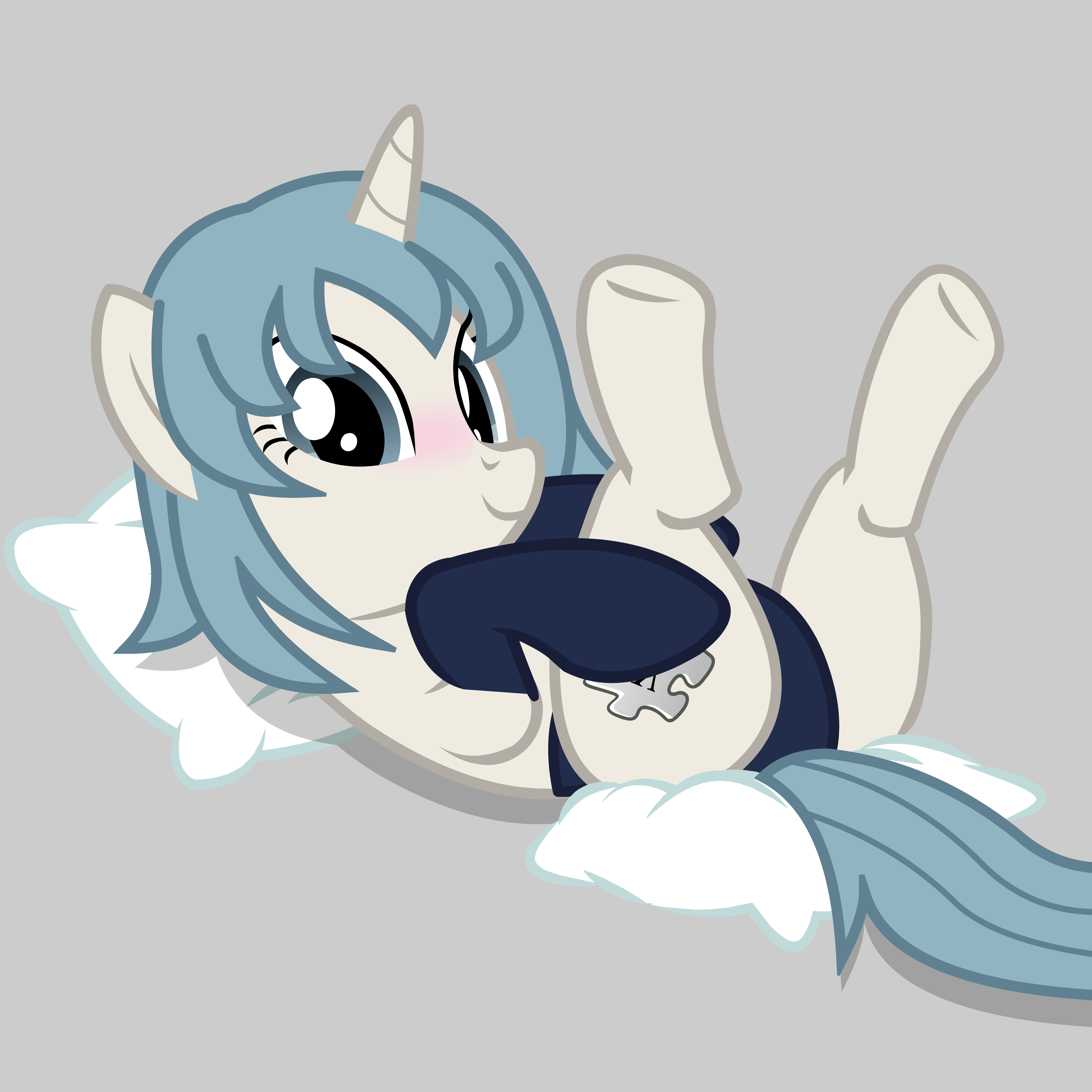
A ponified version (ponysona) of Wikipe-tan, the unofficial mascot of Wikipedia, in a softcore sexually suggestive pose

Clop (also referred to as My Little Pony pornography, or pony porn for short) is erotic and pornographic fan art, fan fiction, fan films, fan games, and other fan labor based on My Little Pony: Friendship Is Magic, My Little Pony: Equestria Girls, and subsequent generations of the My Little Pony franchise. The term clop derives from the onomatopoeia for a hoofbeat and is a pun on fap, an Internet slang term for masturbation. Related terms include clopfic—a portmanteau of clop and fanfic, for erotic My Little Pony fan fiction—and clopping for the act of masturbating to clop.

The brony fandom (the adult fandom of Friendship Is Magic that emerged on the Internet in the early 2010s) gave rise to clop alongside its other forms of fan works. Variously described as a subset of the brony and furry fandoms, clop has grown into one of the largest bodies of erotic fan content associated with any single media franchise. It spans visual art distributed on imageboards, fan fiction published on Fimfiction, and other fan content, including those generated using artificial intelligence tools. Characters from Friendship Is Magic are among the most frequently tagged on the furry pornography imageboard e621, and the My Little Pony imageboard Derpibooru hosts hundreds of thousands of explicit images.

A source of controversy both within and outside the My Little Pony fandom, clop has been criticized by bronies and outsiders alike for sexualizing children's media; in response, bronies have taken measures to tag such works as explicit on search engines and fan sites. Fans of clop consistently distinguish it from zoophilia, as their interest is directed at fictional characters perceived as sapient beings with human-like qualities, rather than at real animals. Though internal fandom surveys in 2013 suggested that only a minority of bronies have engaged in clopping, surveys in recent years have found that consumption of clop has become more widespread and accepted, with a majority of respondents in recent polls reporting that they consider explicit pony content to be a valid form of self-expression.

Clop has received substantial scholarly attention across sexology, folklore, gender studies, queer studies, and fan studies. Academics have variously interpreted clop as a form of queer transgression, an indication of the rising popularity and legitimization of fictosexuality among Western audiences, a reinforcement of traditional gender hierarchies, and an eroticization of cuteness in a manner comparable to moe in otaku culture.

== Etymology and terminology ==
Clop is both an onomatopoeia and a pun or wordplay on fap, itself an onomatopoeic Internet slang term for masturbation. The word is part of bronyspeak, the distinctive vernacular language of the brony fandom, which built upon the show's own practice of recasting human phrases in equine terms (such as everypony for everybody). Due to the fandom's origins on the anonymous imageboard 4chan, bronyspeak expanded into increasingly transgressive territory, incorporating vulgar and sexual terminology alongside the show's family-friendly vocabulary. Folklorist Bill Ellis, writing in the Journal of American Folklore, observed that the anonymous nature of Internet communication encouraged aggressive linguistic play, which facilitated the creation of terms like clopping. Clop has been compared to yiff, the furry fandom's analogous term for erotic fan content, which similarly originated as an onomatopoeia for an animal sound.

The term has given rise to several derivatives within the brony fandom. Clopfic, a portmanteau of clop and fanfic, refers to erotic My Little Pony fan fiction. Clopper denotes a person who consumes or produces clop, and clopping is used as a gerund to describe the act of masturbating to clop.

== History ==
=== Background ===
Erotic slash fiction involving characters from Star Trek circulated among fans as early as the 1970s, and erotic mini-comics known as Tijuana bibles depicted famous media icons in sexual contexts as far back as the 1920s. The advent of the Internet made the distribution of erotic fan works far easier and more anonymous, increasing both the quantity of material produced and the likelihood that non-fans would encounter it accidentally. By the 2000s, Rule 34, an adage which states that pornographic content will inevitably be created for any popular media, had become a well-established Internet meme.

=== Origins ===
Following the premiere of Friendship Is Magic in October 2010, erotic fan works based on the show began appearing on the Internet as an application of Rule 34. The show's adult fanbase originally began on 4chan's /co/ board, and by early 2011, the prevalence of pony content had generated considerable conflict within the 4chan community, with many users expressing frustration over the high volume of Friendship Is Magic content appearing across the site. On February 26, 2011, 4chan implemented a total ban on pony-related content, which resulted in immediate bans for users who posted such material, leading bronies to create dedicated websites to host brony-related content.

As the fandom rapidly expanded beyond 4chan, dedicated platforms developed different approaches to managing erotic content. Derpibooru, the largest and most popular My Little Pony imageboard, adopted a four-tier classification system (safe, suggestive, questionable, and explicit) and became the most permissive of the major fan sites; erotic content consistently ranked among the most popular material on the site by user ratings. Fimfiction, the largest repository of My Little Pony fan fiction, permitted written erotica of virtually any kind but banned erotic visual art entirely. DeviantArt officially prohibited pornographic images but enforced this inconsistently, and artists developed various workarounds to share erotic content on the site. Clop also has a significant presence on the furry pornography imageboard e621, where Twilight Sparkle has been the most frequently tagged character on the entire site since 2012.

=== Growth ===
The volume of clop on the Internet grew rapidly throughout the 2010s and 2020s. On the cartoon pornography website rule34.paheal.net, the number of sexually explicit images tagged My Little Pony rose from approximately 53,000 in 2013 to 65,000 in 2015 and over 95,000 by 2017. On e621, images tagged My Little Pony nearly doubled in two years, from approximately 82,000 in 2015 to over 147,000 in 2017. On Fimfiction, the Clopfics group became the largest community on the site, and specialized subgroups emerged for specific genres of clopfics. As of October 2026, Derpibooru hosts over 550,000 images tagged as explicit, rule34.paheal.net hosts over 171,000 images tagged with My Little Pony, and Fimfiction hosts over 35,000 published works of fan fiction tagged as mature. Twilight Sparkle has over 40,000 tagged images on e621 as the most tagged character on the site, followed by Fluttershy and Rainbow Dash as the third and sixth most tagged characters, respectively.

On /mlp/, the dedicated My Little Pony board on 4chan that was established after the initial ban on pony-related content was reversed, users embraced clop as a central element of their collective identity from early in the board's existence. Users of /mlp/ tended to distinguish themselves sharply from mainstream bronies, instead commonly self-identifying as the tongue-in-cheek labels horsefuckers and ponyfag (Note: When used as a term of identification, the -fag suffix carries a neutral connotation on 4chan.) and constructed a communal identity around their sexual attraction to the show's characters, treating participation in clop as a normative expectation of board membership. Users who discussed real-life romantic relationships were dismissed as "normalfags" and told to leave the board, while erotic and romantic fiction about ponies formed a regular fixture of the board's discussion threads.

A 2015 survey by Pornhub reported that most viewers of My Little Pony-themed pornographic content on Pornhub were millennials between 18 and 24 years old, and that men were 37% more likely to search for such material than women. Rainbow Dash was the most popular character, followed by Rarity and Pinkie Pie. Geographically, consumption was highest in Eastern Europe, with Belarus, Russia, Ukraine, the Czech Republic, and Puerto Rico as the top five markets.

=== Community response ===
As a result of the massive prevalence of clop on the Internet, critics (both bronies and non-bronies) raised concerns that children searching for My Little Pony characters on mainstream search engines could inadvertently encounter explicit material. Very few bronies favored either leaving explicit content entirely unregulated or censoring it outright; many bronies agreed that some preventative measures should be taken to protect children, and the most popular proposals involved requiring tagging systems, content warnings, and safe-search options on fan sites. In 2014, the Tumblr blog "Bronies Against Bullshit" launched the #SafeSearchWrapUp campaign, which organized bronies to systematically flag explicit My Little Pony content on Google and other search engines to prevent children searching for the show's characters from encountering pornographic material. The campaign subsequently expanded to cover other fandoms with young audiences, including Avatar: The Last Airbender and Steven Universe.

=== Other works ===
The Adobe Flash point-and-click adventure game Banned from Equestria (Daily) by Pokehidden became one of the most widely cited examples of erotic My Little Pony fan games. Since the AI boom of the 2020s, generative AI tools have been adopted for the production of clop, most notably the use of 15.ai for AI voice acting in explicit fan videos.

== Reception ==
=== Prevalence within the brony fandom ===
In 2013, an internal survey of the brony community found that 19.05% of respondents reported having engaged in clopping, though the actual figure was believed to be higher given the social stigma attached to the practice at the time. Thomas Raethel of Critic Te Ārohi wrote that early supporters of clop in the brony fandom's inception included converts from the furry fandom, who brought with them existing traditions of erotic anthropomorphic fan art and channelled them into My Little Pony content. In 2015, Mikko Hautakangas wrote in the Journal of Popular Television that most Finnish bronies adopted an "accepting but marginalizing" stance toward clop, in that they acknowledged its existence while regarding it as not representative of the fandom as a whole. That same year, The Guardian reported that the 4chan brony community (/mlp/) generally saw not clopping as a form of heresy, and viewed having sex with a real person negatively.

Bronies' attitudes toward pornographic content as a form of self-expression
1. Valid/Has place in fandom (15%)
2. Valid/Needs to be tolerated (45%)
3. Unsure (Note: In the bar chart printed as Figure 11.4 in the book Meet the Bronies, the values of the bars do not add up to exactly 100%; as printed, the values are (from left to right) 15%, 45%, 15%, 15%, and 5%, yielding a total sum of 95%. Edwards notes in the book that "less than 20 percent of the community wishes to see the material limited or outright banned", so the 5% margin must be contained within the first three bars. To err on the safe side, the 5% margin has been added onto the "Unsure" column.) (20%)
4. Corrupting/Needs to be limited (15%)
5. Corrupting/Needs to be banned (5%)

In 2019, large-scale surveys of the brony fandom found that roughly one-third of bronies rarely consumed clop, one-third did so occasionally, and one-third did so frequently. About 5% of bronies also created explicit content. Fifty-six percent of bronies said they preferred non-pornographic over pornographic fan art, and 32% had no strong preference. Female fans were significantly more likely to prefer non-explicit content and were nearly four times more likely to report not consuming pornography at all. About 13% of bronies held strongly negative views about clop, less than 20% wished to see clop limited or banned, and the majority regarded it as a valid form of self-expression even among those who did not personally consume it. The overwhelming majority of bronies reported that pornography had not been a factor in drawing them to the fandom. When surveyed about what the community should do, few bronies favored either a complete free-for-all or outright censorship; the most popular responses involved tagging systems and safe-search options to protect younger fans from inadvertent exposure. In 2022, MEL reported that male bronies who enjoyed clop represented "not a tiny minority," referencing a Twitter poll in which nearly half of brony respondents reported interest in clop. In a 2024 online poll on Equestria Daily, approximately 59% of surveyed bronies answered that they enjoy explicit pony content.

=== Individual attitudes and experiences ===
Bronies' attitudes towards MLP-themed pornography
1. Very positive (14%)
2. Positive (15%)
3. Somewhat positive (16%)
4. Mixed (26%)
5. Somewhat negative (7%)
6. Negative (9%)
7. Very negative (13%)

Most bronies' first exposure to clop was incidental rather than deliberate, typically occurring while browsing fan sites for non-explicit content. Most reported relatively low levels of guilt associated with viewing explicit material, though a notable exception was the widespread expectation that their parents would be disappointed if they discovered such consumption. However, Edwards notes that that may have reflected broader stigma toward the brony fandom rather than shame specific to pornography.

Users of /mlp/ described their initial discovery of attraction to the show's characters with ambivalence. One user recalled being "creeped out, and disappointed in myself," while another described the experience as "strange and worried" and said, "it kinda came out of nowhere." Users adopted the term waifu (a loanword from Japanese otaku culture denoting a favored fictional partner) to describe the pony characters to whom they felt a special bond. Bronies interviewed at brony conventions and meetups were generally forthcoming about the existence of clop and often treated it with a blasé attitude. One brony stated: "everybody watches porn, everybody reads porn. It's not a secret. If you say you don't then [sic] you're either a liar or a liar." He acknowledged finding some erotic fan art appealing, describing a fan-created My Little Pony doujinshi with "really spectacular art" that left him asking "I don't know if I should be turned on by this?" Another was more hesitant but said he would occasionally look at explicit content, adding, "I just tend to let the other people enjoy what they enjoy." A third interviewee distinguished between different styles of clop, noting that the erotica he had encountered depicted the characters "more like humans" rather than as ponies, praising the artwork. Multiple fans emphasized the sheer amount of pornography in the fandom's online spaces, with one stating: "The visual stuff you will see at some point. You're on a forum and you'll scroll past some stuff. So yeah at a certain point you really can't escape it."

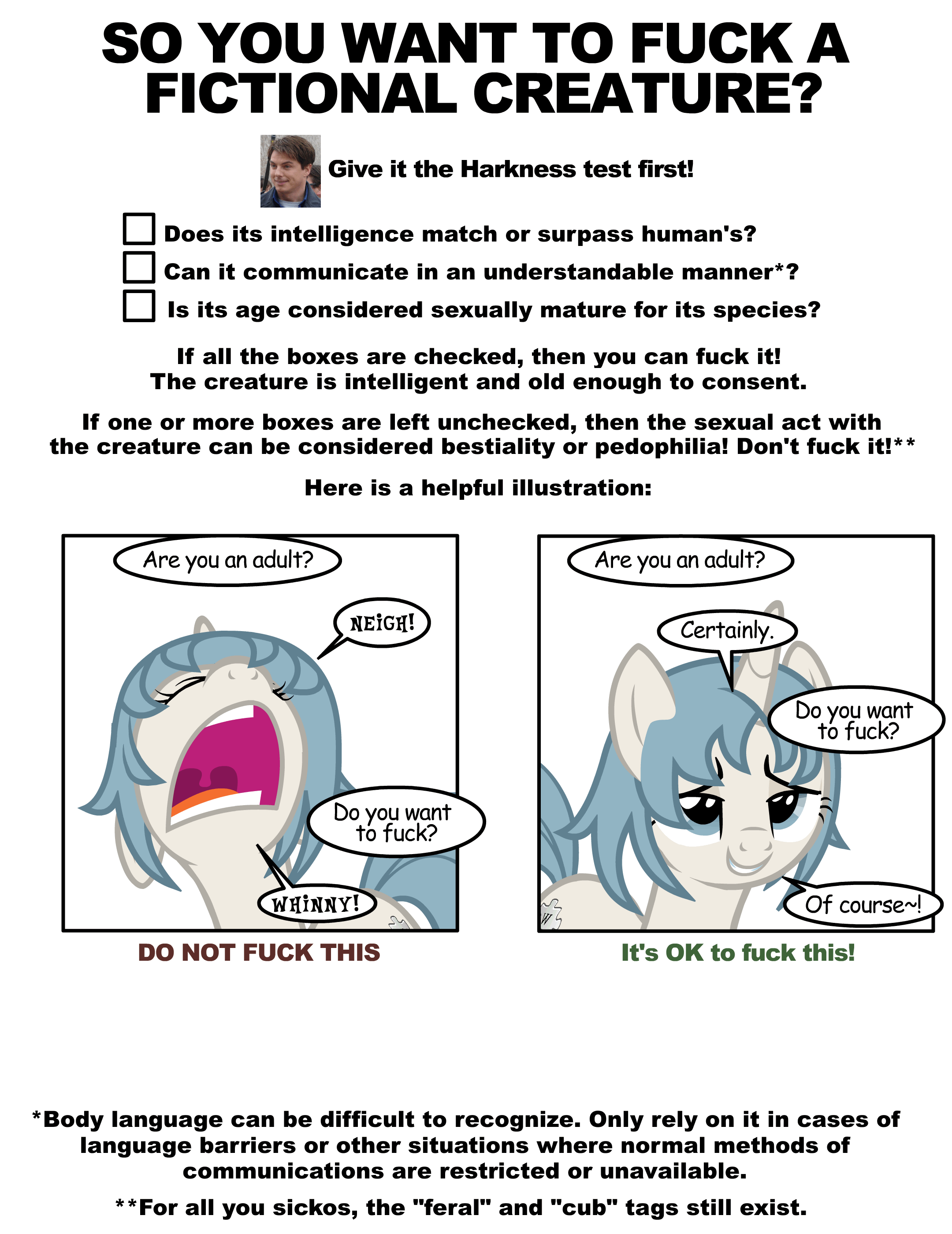
A ponified version of the Harkness Test

Advocates of clopping consistently distinguish it from zoophilia or bestiality, as the ponies in Friendship Is Magic are depicted as sapient beings with human-like personalities, emotions, and social lives. The Harkness Test, a set of criteria determining whether it is ethical to have sexual relations with a non-human character, gained popularity in the early 2010s due to its application by the brony fandom. On fan forums, debates over the acceptability of clop often turned on this distinction; one participant argued that cloppers were attracted to "humanized ponies" with "human faces, human voices, human personalities," and that attraction to Rainbow Dash was "a lot different than being attracted to a fucking horse." Many bronies have confirmed that they have no interest in real horses, with some expressing active dislike of actual equines while maintaining a strong attachment to the show's ponies. One fan stated: "I don't really care for the look of real ponies... But I find [the ponies in Friendship Is Magic] appealing because... they don't have hooves, they have these weird little stumps and these little tiny nubby noses and the big giant anime eyes."

=== Outside reactions ===
In 2013, Katie Notopoulos of BuzzFeed News wrote that clop "begat a myriad of horrifying subgenres". The following year, Gianna DeCarlo of The Baltimore Sun condemned clop as an "unstoppable force of sexual deviancy" from which "not even a simple Google search is safe", and E.J. Dickson of The Daily Dot wrote that clop enthusiasts were "black sheep" in the brony community, most of whom feared that cloppers would give the fandom a bad name. However, in 2015, The Guardian reported on research presented at the International Conference on Masculinities that framed clopping as one of several ways in which men attempted to escape traditional masculine norms while remaining influenced by them, placing it alongside activities such as foam sword fighting and therapeutic friendship groups as examples of men navigating the constraints of hegemonic masculinity.

According to Claire Burdfield in the Journal of Popular Television, the reason that the brony fandom attracted a disproportionate amount of public and media scrutiny (despite erotic fan content being present in earlier fandoms) was because of the public nature of the Internet—including the visibility and popularity of clop—to the general public (see Analysis § Internet anonymity and community formation).

== Analysis ==
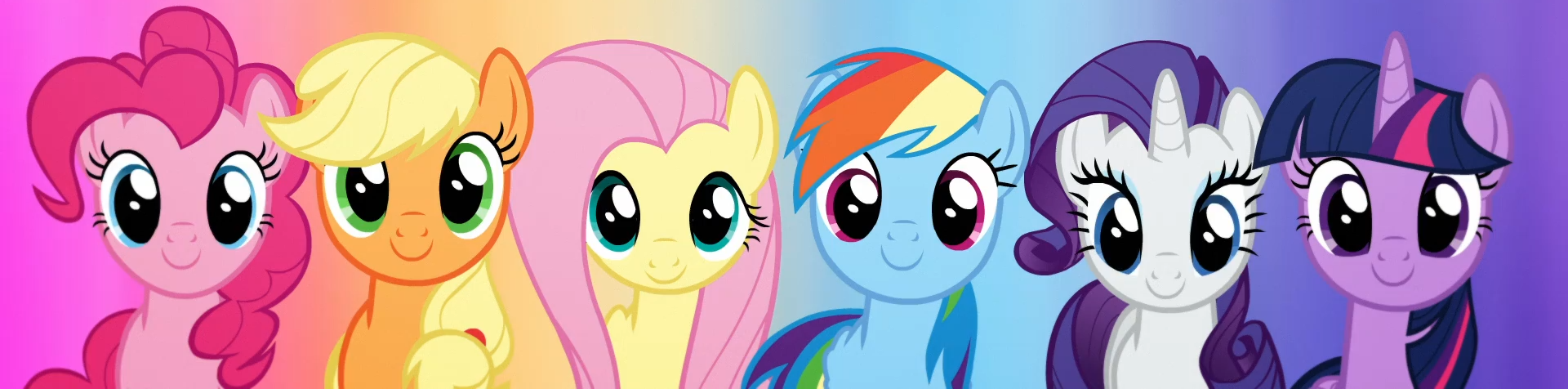
The Mane Six have been described as embodying kawaii visual traits commonly associated with moe, such as pastel colors, large reflective eyes, and juvenile proportions.

=== Cuteness, kawaii, and moe ===
The brony fandom has been described as an American manifestation of Japanese moe (a phenomenon in otaku culture involving the romanticization or eroticization of cute fictional characters). Fans have noted that the ponies in Friendship Is Magic possess pastel colors, large reflective eyes, and juvenile proportions—visual traits commonly associated with moe and the kawaii aesthetic. Clop art tends to preserve and eroticize the ponies' cuteness regardless of its style, ranging from faithful reproductions of the show's style to fully humanized anime-style depictions. Clop commonly features expressions of sexual naivety, flushed faces, and coy dialogue. The degree of anthropomorphism in clop varies greatly; in some fan art, ponies are given human genitalia, more human-like proportions, or fully humanized forms, while only retaining distinguishing features like manes and cutie marks.

=== Fictophilia, economic status of the United States, and "love capitalism" ===
In the book The Retro-Futurism of Cuteness, American culture professor Justin Mullis wrote that bronies' attraction to the ponies of Friendship Is Magic followed a pattern previously documented among Japanese otaku. According to psychologist Tamaki Saitō, fans who become deeply immersed in a fictional universe can develop genuine romantic and sexual feelings toward its characters not because they are confusing fiction with reality, but because their emotional investment is real even when the characters are not. In Japan, this phenomenon was a driving force behind moe culture, and Mullis wrote that the brony fandom was the American parallel of the same dynamic: bronies describe emotional bonds with specific pony characters (see § Individual attitudes and experiences) and often use the otaku term waifu to describe them. According to Saitō, such desires should not be considered perverse, since their objects exist only in fiction, but also wrote that since they are not innate, they must be "developed over time" through "training or study".

Economic conditions were a major factor in the rise of fictophilia (sexual and romantic attraction towards fictional characters in media) in the United States. Mullis compared Japan's economic stagnation of the late 1990s (which coincided with the rise of moe culture in Japan) with the 2007–2009 recession in the United States, which immediately preceded the emergence of the brony fandom. Takuro Morinaga had predicted moe would spread globally as more young men struggled economically. During the earliest years of the brony fandom, 32% of bronies were employed, and 96% were single. With moe advocate Toru Honda's concept of "love capitalism", the idea that modern dating has become so expensive and transactional that many young men feel priced out of romance entirely, forming attachments to fictional characters was described as offering a "low-cost, low-stress" alternative to real-world dating.

=== Queer transgression ===
Folklorist Bill Ellis wrote in the Journal of American Folklore that bronies "poach" elements from Friendship Is Magic and repurpose them in consciously transgressive ways that challenge mainstream attitudes toward gender and sexuality. Ellis drew a parallel to earlier fan works like Star Trek slash fiction, in which fans created homoerotic stories about Kirk and Spock as a way of exploring questions of sexual and gender identity; clop, he wrote, serves a similar function for bronies. According to Ellis, because animated characters lack biological gender, the ponies of Friendship Is Magic could reasonably be interpreted as embodying any sexual orientation, which was effectively a queering interpretation of the show. Jack Halberstam's queer studies framework, which holds that animation allows characters' bodies to be reshaped in ways that cross conventional boundaries of sexuality, gives viewers more ways to explore gender identity while still being "under the radar" of cultural gatekeepers seeking to enforce traditional sexual politics.

=== Masculinity and sexual politics ===
Although bronies were widely celebrated as a progressive movement for crossing gender boundaries by embracing a show made for girls, Mullis wrote that male bronies tended to demonstrate an alternative form of masculinity rather than to engage with the show's feminist themes on their own. The routine sexualization of the Mane Six in clop, where the characters' individual personalities were often reduced to their role as objects of sexual desire, allowed male fans to assert a masculine presence in a space perceived as feminine. According to Mullis, the prevalence of graphic pornography within the fandom serves to discourage female participation by reinforcing the community's "illicit and outlaw status" (qualities which are traditionally seen as masculine-coded) while paradoxically marking male bronies as practitioners of a non-mainstream sexuality that strengthened rather than undermined their masculine identity.

=== Internet anonymity and community formation ===
Claire Burdfield wrote in the Journal of Popular Television that the Internet was the main factor that transformed what would otherwise have been isolated, invisible viewers into a coherent and visible community. In the past, adult viewers of children's programming could have watched in private without ever connecting with one another. The Internet, however, gave adult viewers a space to congregate and share fan works at a highly public scale that was impossible to ignore. Anonymity was especially important in shaping the kind of community that formed: because participants on sites like 4chan were usually anonymous or identified themselves pseudonymously, they were free to engage in aggressive and transgressive forms of play that would normally be considered taboo. This directly facilitated the creation of sexually charged bronyspeak terms like clopping and drove the rapid proliferation of explicit fan content.

Bailey and Harvey, in their ethnographic study of /mlp/, extended this argument further: They argued that online anonymity actively turned bronies' stigmatized desires into a basis for collective identity. Because anonymous users could freely share their attraction to the show's characters, sexual and romantic feelings that would otherwise remain private were discussed openly and treated as an indication of belonging. The label horsefucker (a derogatory term used by non-brony 4chan users to describe bronies as degenerates) was instead embraced by /mlp/ as a tongue-in-cheek marker of community membership.

== See also ==
- Hentai – Anime and manga pornography
- Internet pornography – Any pornography that is accessible over the Internet
- Nijikon – Attraction to two-dimensional characters
- Overwatch and pornography – Pornography of the video game franchise Overwatch
- Pokémon and pornography – Pornography of the media franchise Pokémon
- Tumblr Sexyman – Fictional character that gains popularity as a sex symbol
