= Religion and spirituality in the My Little Pony: Friendship Is Magic fandom =

Religious and spiritual expression among bronies

Within the My Little Pony: Friendship Is Magic fandom—also known as the brony fandom—religion and spirituality are recurring subjects of fan works, debate, and academic study. Christian-themed fan fiction and fan art, Bible studies based on Friendship Is Magic, biblical retellings using pony characters, debates over episodes interpreted as addressing faith and reason, and various spiritual interpretations of Equestria and its characters are examples of religious and spiritual expression found among bronies. Associated with niche subgroups within a large and varied fandom, these practices have been analyzed by scholars in relation to religion and popular culture, fan studies, lived religion, and hyper-real religion.

== Background ==
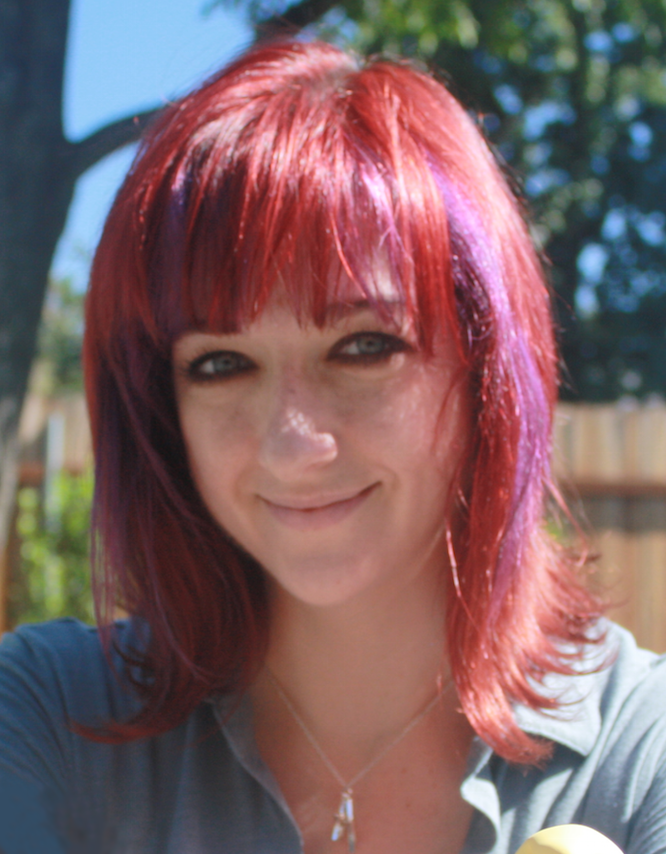
Lauren Faust, the creator of My Little Pony: Friendship Is Magic

My Little Pony: Friendship Is Magic is an animated television series developed by Lauren Faust for Hasbro that premiered in 2010 as part of the fourth generation of the My Little Pony franchise. Although the series was marketed primarily to young girls, it attracted an unexpected adult fanbase known as bronies, whose fan culture developed through online discussion, fan fiction, fan art, fan music, fan conventions, and other fan activities. While the series itself contains little to no direct religious references, its lack of overt religion made its fictional setting, Equestria, available for various religious and spiritual interpretations among fans.

== Religious expression in fan works ==
=== Christian fan fiction and art ===
According to historian of religion Andrew Crome, Christian bronies have used My Little Pony fan fiction and fan art to promote religious literacy, explore theological questions, engage in evangelism, and perform biblical exegesis. Crome wrote that because fans are already familiar with the personalities, relationships, and moral roles of the show's characters, writers and artists are able to use those characters as shorthand for Christian themes like sin, repentance, forgiveness, conversion, humility, and virtue, thus equating Christian fan literacy with religious literacy.

Christian My Little Pony fan fiction include stories in which ponies encounter Christianity, alternate versions of Equestria (alternate universe) shaped by Christian theology, and stories that use Friendship Is Magic characters to model ideal Christian behavior. In his 2014 article in Culture and Religion, Crome discusses examples of such fan fiction in which Rainbow Dash, Fluttershy, Pinkie Pie, Twilight Sparkle, and Princess Celestia are used to explore themes of prayer, salvation, substitutionary atonement, theodicy, and evangelism. Further, Crome describes works of fan art that pair elements of the series with biblical passages, such as depictions of the Fruit of the Holy Spirit and scenes from actual episodes, like "Feeling Pinkie Keen". Crome concludes that such practices are not a replacement of one's religion by its fandom, and is rather a synthesis between faith and popular culture.

=== Reception of the Bible ===
In the essay The Bible and My Little Pony, religious studies professor Tom de Bruin wrote that Christian My Little Pony fan works are examples of the reception of the Bible combined with fans' interactions with popular culture. The series itself contains little overt religion but has nevertheless been used by Christian fans as a "blank canvas" for open-ended theological interpretation. One example described in the essay is the YouTube "outreach ministry" Shady Oak, which produced a 213-part Bible study series on Friendship Is Magic analyzing biblical themes in the show. De Bruin identified several types of Christian My Little Pony fan fiction, such as pony retellings of biblical stories, Christian adventures set in Equestria, and retellings of the show's canon with Christianity added. In one fan fiction example called the "Kindness and the Lamb", Fluttershy (the Element of Kindness) is inserted into the Gethsemane narrative of Luke 22 and replaces the angel who appears to Jesus. In another, "A Rainbow's Prayer", the line "My prayers have been answered" from the episode "May the Best Pet Win!" spoken by Rainbow Dash is interpreted as an actual Christian prayer, after which the story follows the rest of the episode.

== Debates between faith and reason ==
The season one episode "Feeling Pinkie Keen" was one of the earliest major religion-related controversies in the brony fandom. In the episode, Twilight Sparkle attempts to explain Pinkie Pie's "Pinkie Sense", a form of extrasensory perception (sixth sense) that lets Pinkie predict falling objects and other impending events. Twilight initially treats the Pinkie Sense as scientifically impossible but, despite not understanding it, eventually accepts that Pinkie Sense is real. Some fans interpreted the episode as a promotion of supernatural faith and anti-scientific thinking; episode writer Dave Polsky and Faust herself denied such allegations. Some fans criticized the episode as sending an inappropriate message to children by appearing to endorse unquestioning belief, while others reinterpreted it as a pro-science episode about poor scientific method. According to Crome, the debate was a way for fans to discuss religion, skepticism, science, and faith through the world of Equestria, though some bronies sought to distance their fandom from associations with religious irrationality, partly because fandoms in general are often pathologized through comparisons to religious devotion.

== Spirituality among bronies ==
In his essay on the development of spirituality in the brony fandom, Pavol Kosnáč distinguished ordinary and hardcore fans from "devotees", whom he defines by the extent to which Friendship Is Magic shapes their everyday lifestyle, worldview, and ethics. According to Kosnáč, devotees do not merely enjoy the series or participate heavily in the fandom, but also use it as a source of moral reasoning and guidance. Kosnáč wrote that, for such fans, the series functions as personal mythology and hence a genuine tool of spirituality; for example, some bronies have adapted the Christian phrase "What would Jesus do?" as "What would Pony do?" According to Kosnáč, there are various forms of brony devotion, including the "joy effect" (in which some bronies reported that watching Friendship Is Magic produced a lasting feeling of happiness and optimism that they considered distinct from the enjoyment produced by other television programs or films), moral regeneration, and a sense of security and acceptance. He also described the unofficial fandom motto "love and tolerate" as a practical ethical principle among some devotees, while the Elements of Harmony are viewed as a model for ideal moral behavior.

In her study of brony spirituality, Amie Sexton wrote that the belief in, or hope for, Equestria as an afterlife is one of the broadest spiritual motifs in the brony fandom. In comment sections of deceased bronies, other bronies would often write condolence phrases like "I hope you found your Equestria" and "Rest in Harmony". Sexton also wrote that some memes involving a "portal to Equestria" would reference this Equestria-as-an-afterlife motif with suicidal imagery, which she described as a potential mental health concern in some subgroups of the fandom. In some cases, dissociative identity disorder and tulpamancy were sometimes admired or aspired to by other fans because they appeared to make Equestria and its characters more accessible or real. "Snowpity", a post-ironic spiritual concept that originated from /mlp/-adjacent spaces as an inside joke before later being defined as a profound essence or soul-like quality of female pony characters (mares), has been compared to Kosnáč's "joy effect".

== Lived religion ==
In his 2019 article in Culture and Religion, Crome compared Christian bronies' fandom to lived religion, in that some Christian bronies incorporate fandom into ordinary religious life rather than treating their fandom as a secular replacement for religion. Based on analysis of interviews with Christian bronies in the United States, Canada, and the United Kingdom, Crome observed that the brony fandom functions as a shared cultural language through which Christian bronies can discuss theological ideas, express religious identity, and communicate faith to other Christian bronies, which challenges the notion that fandom and religion must be rivals.

== See also ==
- Analysis of the My Little Pony: Friendship Is Magic fandom
- Charity of the My Little Pony: Friendship Is Magic fandom
- Ponysona
- Slang of the My Little Pony: Friendship Is Magic fandom
