= 15 (software engineer) =

American software engineer (born 1998/1999)

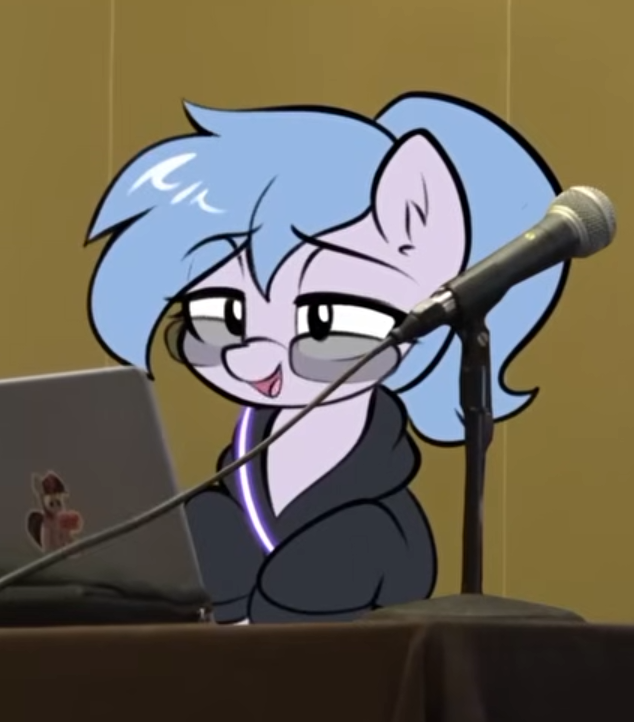
- A depiction of 15's ponysona at Everfree Northwest in 2025
- Born: 1998 or 1999 (age 26–27)
- Education: Massachusetts Institute of Technology (BS, MS)
- Notable work: 15.ai

Twitch information
- Channel: tenfive15_

X information
- Handle: @fifteenai
- Website: 15.dev

15 is a software engineer best known for creating 15.ai, a text-to-speech website credited with popularizing AI voice cloning. The pseudonym 15 is a reference to his claim that 15 seconds of speech is sufficient to clone a voice up to human standards, which was corroborated by OpenAI in 2024.

15 graduated from the Massachusetts Institute of Technology (MIT), where he began developing the technology behind 15.ai as a freshman. The site launched in 2020 and went viral the following year, becoming one of the first mainstream applications of generative AI. In 2022, he exposed the NFT company Voiceverse for plagiarizing 15.ai to promote its partnership with voice actor Troy Baker.

Media outlets and AI researchers praised his work on 15.ai, highlighting 15.ai's non-commercial and indie status in a highly technical field normally dominated by corporations. Well known within the brony community, 15 is identified with his ponysona, a light blue pony original character, and has supported and founded various fandom-related projects.

== Education and career ==
15 attended the Massachusetts Institute of Technology (MIT).

=== 15.ai ===
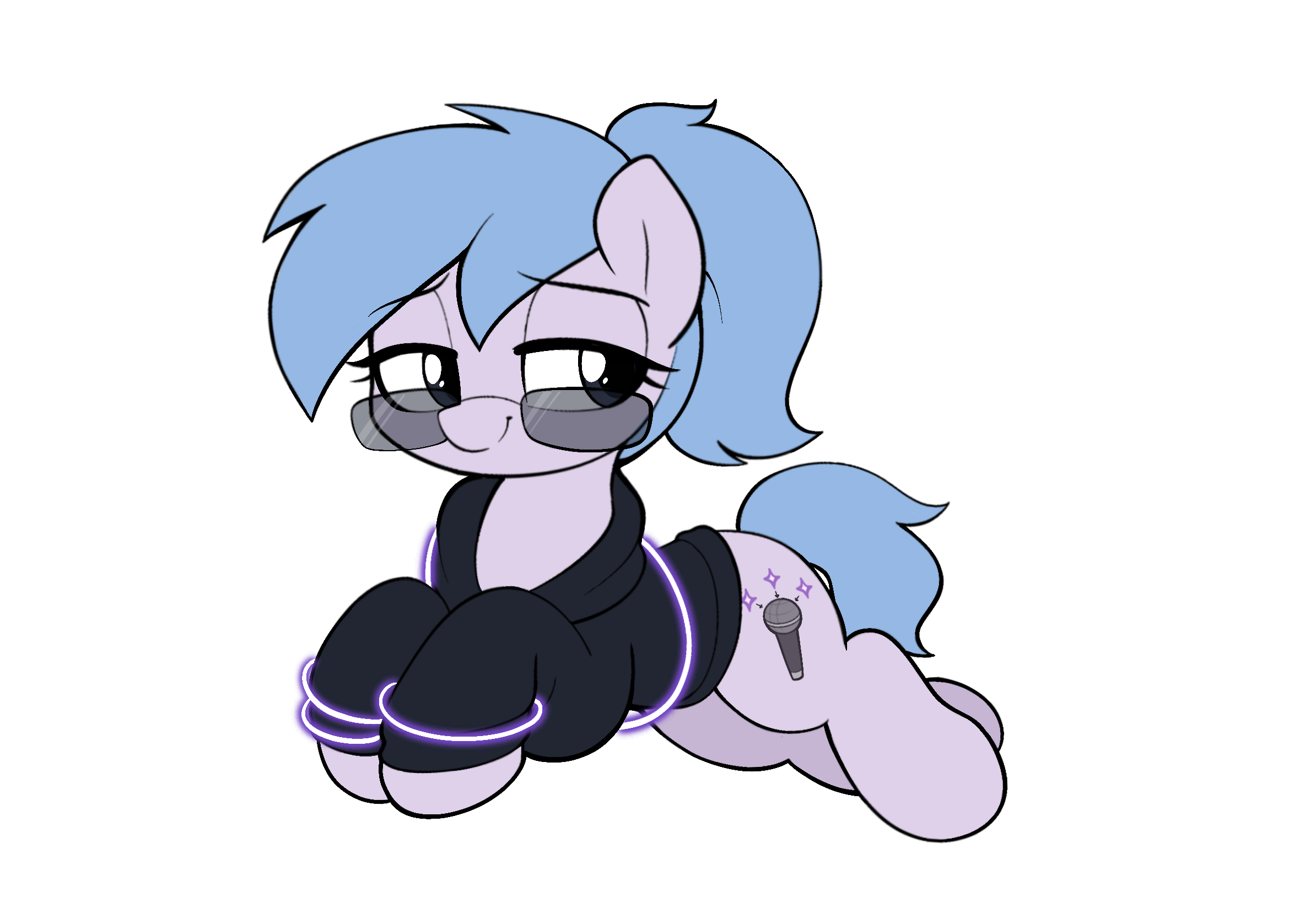
15's ponysona, a light-blue pony original character, has been used as the mascot of the 15.ai website.

15 began researching speech synthesis during his first year at MIT, having been inspired by Google DeepMind's WaveNet paper. His undergraduate research focused on minimizing the amount of recorded speech needed to reproduce a voice. His pseudonym refers to his claim that 15 seconds of speech is sufficient to produce a voice clone of human-like quality; the same idea gave the project its name, 15.ai. This assertion was later corroborated by OpenAI in 2024.

In March 2020, 15 released 15.ai as a free, non-commercial web application that allowed users to generate speech in the voices of fictional characters. One of the first mainstream applications of generative AI and the first of audio deepfake technology, 15.ai became an international viral phenomenon in 2021 and popularized voice cloning in memes and content creation. Reception to the project and its developer were generally positive, with many reviews particularly praising 15.ai's ease of use despite its technical sophistication and the impressiveness of an indie project outperforming contemporary models created by large tech companies. For his work on 15.ai, Player called 15 a "brilliant engineer", and Independent described him as a "programming prodigy". On Marginal Revolution, economist Tyler Cowen mentioned 15 as an "underrated talent in AI".

15.ai went offline in September 2022 due to legal complications regarding copyright infringement. In May 2025, 15.ai was revived under the name "15.dev".

==== Voiceverse NFT plagiarism scandal ====
In January 2022, 15 accused Voiceverse, an NFT company that had announced a partnership with voice actor Troy Baker, of using audio generated by 15.ai in its promotional material without attribution. He publicized the allegation on Twitter, and Voiceverse subsequently acknowledged that its marketing team had used 15.ai without giving credit. 15 responded to the company's apology with "Go fuck yourself". The exchange circulated widely online and drew a large amount of support for the developer. News publications reported that Voiceverse had plagiarized from 15, and the incident was documented in multiple AI ethics databases, criticisms of predatory monetization in video games, and retrospectives as one of the earliest instances of plagiarism and theft during the AI boom.

=== Other projects ===
In May 2026, 15 launched Artist Alley, a fandom online marketplace for physical and digital merchandise and art commissions. He cited conversations with artists and vendors he met at fan conventions as an impetus for creating the platform. That month, he also announced the indefinite closure of 15.dev (Note: Since its closure, the site 15.dev now leads to 15's personal website.) to focus on running Artist Alley.

In August 2026, 15 released 3place, a collaborative voxel art browser game inspired by wplace. The website allows users to build with colored blocks on a shared three-dimensional map of Earth.

== Personal life ==
An active member of the brony community, 15 is a frequent attendee of furry and brony conventions. He is identified with his ponysona, a light-blue pony original character based on Tadano, a tech entrepreneur from the animated series Aggretsuko. Within the brony community, 15 is regarded as a celebrity for his work on 15.ai, a status known as being "horse famous" in the vernacular of the brony fandom. In April 2025, 15 donated $5,000 to help fund Pinkaboo's Neighhem, a brony music concert held at Fox Theatre after BABSCon. A creative coder, he is known to create websites for My Little Pony fan conventions, including HarmonyCon. 15 has aphantasia, the inability to visualize mental images.
