= Online communities of the My Little Pony: Friendship Is Magic fandom =

Online communities of My Little Pony fans

Since the 2010 debut of My Little Pony: Friendship Is Magic, numerous online communities have been created to support the show's adult fandom (commonly known as bronies), including fan sites, imageboards, and social media platforms. Even after the conclusion of the television series in 2019, online spaces dedicated to Friendship Is Magic have remained active, with some experiencing increased engagement during the COVID-19 lockdowns of 2020.

== List of fan community websites ==
=== Equestria Daily ===
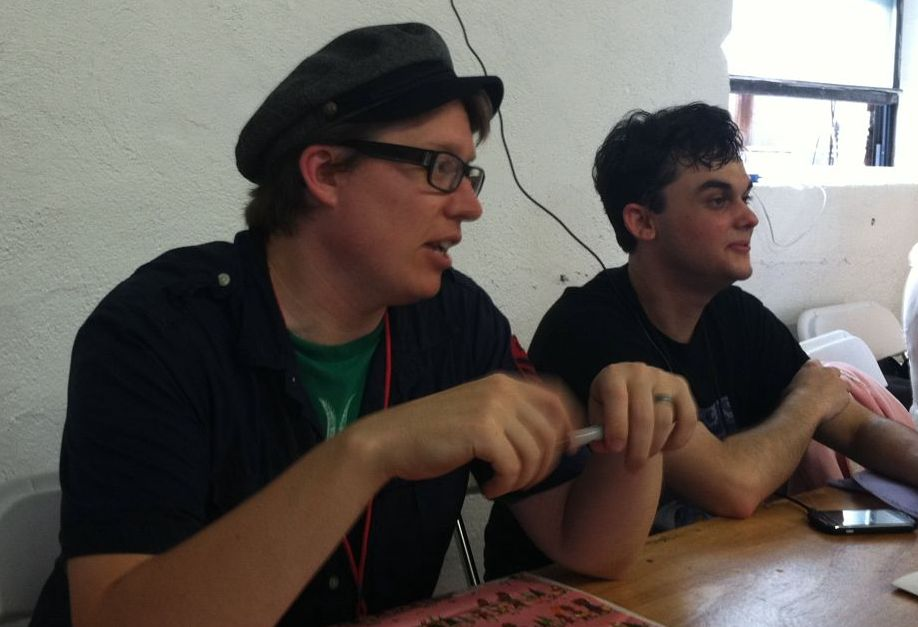
Jayson Thiessen (left) and Shaun Scotellaro ("Sethisto") at BroNYCon 2011

Established in January 2011 by Shaun Scotellaro (known online as "Sethisto"), Equestria Daily is one of the largest and most influential news sites in the brony community. The site aggregates fan artwork, fiction, videos, and music, while also reporting on official franchise announcements. By 2014, the site had surpassed 500 million views. In 2017, selected archives of Equestria Daily were included in the Library of Congress's "Web Cultures Web Archive Collection".

=== /mlp/ ===
/mlp/ is the My Little Pony board on 4chan. Created by 4chan's founder Christopher "moot" Poole in February 2012 following the growing popularity of pony-related content on 4chan, /mlp/ is a transgressive community within the brony fandom, with some users (referred to as anons) preferring to adopt self-deprecating terms like horsefuckers or ponyfags. The board has hosted Q&A sessions with series creator Lauren Faust and screenwriter M.A. Larson, and has been the subject of academic research examining its distinct fan culture.

=== Derpibooru ===
Founded in 2012, Derpibooru is the largest dedicated imageboard for My Little Pony fan art. Named after the fan-created character Derpy Hooves and the suffix -booru (from Japanese, meaning "board"), the site hosts over 3.1 million images as of April 2025. The site employs a user-driven tagging system and content rating categories ranging from "safe" to "explicit." In June 2020, following controversies during the George Floyd protests, Derpibooru implemented policy changes banning racist content.

=== Fimfiction ===
Launched in July 2011, Fimfiction is the largest repository for My Little Pony fan fiction. As of 2025, the site hosts over 155,000 published stories and has more than 624,000 registered users. Unlike many fan fiction communities that trend female in participation, Fimfiction has a predominantly male audience. The site features a comprehensive content rating system, specialized user groups for different genres and interests, and a "distributed mentoring" system where writers receive feedback from multiple community members.

=== MLPForums ===
Launched in February 2011, MLPForums is a discussion forum for the brony community. MLPForums features a traditional forum structure with registered usernames and profiles. The site includes specialized sections like the "Welcoming Plaza" where new members introduce themselves, art and creative sections, and areas for discussing episodes and characters.

=== Pony Town ===
Pony Town is a 2016 browser-based virtual world massively multiplayer online role-playing game in which players can customize pony original characters and ponysonas. In February 2021, a user uploaded a video about Pony Town on Douyin, which went viral, causing an influx of Chinese fans to the site. This caused lag on the site and backlash from the player-base, so a few days later a Chinese language server was added to the game. Pony Town is one of the most used websites among Chinese bronies, along with FimTale and Derpibooru, according to a census taken in 2024. In Vietnam, Pony Town ranked second in Google's 2023 Year in Search list for games, and experienced a 5,102% increase in searches on the Vietnamese browser Cốc Cốc during the third quarter of 2023 compared with the preceding quarter.

During the COVID-19 pandemic, the 2022 edition of Vanhoover Pony Expo was conducted virtually using a Pony Town server that featured digitally recreated Vancouver landmarks. In August 2026, Russian media outlets reported allegations of sexual content, bullying, and extremist roleplaying affecting children on Pony Town, including reports of users impersonating Nazis and serial killers.

=== Ponychan ===
Founded in February 2011 following the temporary ban of pony content on 4chan, The rapid growth of pony-related content on 4chan, which increased from 200 to 6,000 posts per day between October 2010 and February 2011, and the persistent backlash and resentment from non-brony 4chan users, contributed to the need for a dedicated space. Ponychan was created by former 4chan users seeking a space where they could freely discuss Friendship Is Magic without 4chan's restrictions. Ponychan shut down in January 2024.

== Mainstream platforms ==
DeviantArt has been a major platform for My Little Pony fan artists since 2011. By June 2012, the site hosted more than 500,000 pieces of Friendship Is Magic artwork. The brony community on DeviantArt organizes around themed groups, with some containing more than tens of thousands of members. Multiple subreddits are dedicated to My Little Pony, with r/mylittlepony serving as the main community hub. Other specialized subreddits include r/MLPLounge for off-topic discussion and r/clopclop for pornography of the characters.

YouTube hosts numerous My Little Pony-focused channels dedicated to analysis, reviews, animations, and music. The platform has been used for sharing fan-created "pony music videos" (PMVs) and animations. My Little Pony fan works have also gained popularity on TikTok.

== See also ==
- My Little Pony: Friendship Is Magic fandom
- My Little Pony: Friendship Is Magic fan fiction
- Music of the My Little Pony: Friendship Is Magic fandom
- Art of the My Little Pony: Friendship Is Magic fandom
- My Little Pony fan convention
- Slang of the My Little Pony: Friendship Is Magic fandom
