= Fan language =

Fan language may refer to:

- An alternative spelling of the Fang language
- A dialect of the Berom language
- A supposed secret or discreet language that used fans (see Hand fan#19th century)
- A language used by the fandom of something, see fanspeak
