= Slan =

1940 novel by A. E. van Vogt

- First edition
- Author: A. E. van Vogt
- Cover artist: Robert E. Hubbell
- Language: English
- Genre: Science fiction
- Publisher: Arkham House
- Publication date: 1940, 1946
- Publication place: Canada
- Media type: Print (Hardback)
- Pages: 216

Slan is a science-fiction novel by the Canadian-American writer A. E. van Vogt (1912–2000) — it is also the name of the fictional race of superbeings featured in the novel. The work was first serialized in the magazine Astounding Science Fiction (Sept–Dec 1940) and then published in hardcover in 1946 by Arkham House in an edition of 4,051 copies.

In 2016, Slan was awarded the Retro-Hugo Award for Best Novel for 1941.

== Plot summary ==
Slans are evolved humans, named after their alleged creator, Samuel Lann. They can read minds and are super-intelligent. They possess near limitless stamina, "nerves of steel", and superior strength and speed. When Slans are ill or seriously injured, they retreat into a healing trance. However, the human dictator Kier Gray leads a campaign to exterminate the Slans.

There are two kinds of Slans. One type has tendrils on their heads and can read the minds of ordinary humans and telepathically communicate with other Slans. The tendrils are golden-colored, making it easy to spot them. These Slans are hunted to near extinction. The other type is tendrilless, equally as intelligent as the tendrilled kind but without psychic abilities, except the ability to hide their thoughts from the first type of Slan.

As the novel begins, nine-year-old Jommy Cross (a Slan of the first type) travels with his mother to the capital, Centropolis. They are discovered and Jommy's mother is killed, while Jommy flees. Jommy Cross is not only the heir to the brilliant inventions of his father, but he represents the last hope of the Slan race to save it from genocide. In fulfilling his mission, he seeks to destroy Kier Gray, and, in their final confrontation, discovers an astonishing secret.

== Reception ==
Groff Conklin, reviewing a 1951 edition, described Slan as "a little overblown, considerably melodramatic, but still [a] really gripping adventure story." P. Schuyler Miller called Slan "van Vogt's first and most famous novel, perhaps his best."

In 1975, R.D. Mullen reported Slan to be "perhaps the most widely read, and perhaps the best of [van Vogt's] novels." He described the situation of the Slan minority in the imagined society as "obviously intended" as analogous to "the position of the Jews in the Third Reich", though in the novel "there actually is a secret world-wide conspiracy, and the Slans actually do control the world in much the same way as is imagined about the Jews by students of The Protocols of Zion."

In a back-cover blurb in the 1998 Orb edition, Charles de Lint says this: "Over fifty years on from when it first saw print, van Vogt's Slan is still one of the quintessential classics in the field that other SF novels will inevitably be measured against."

== "Fans are slans" ==
In American science fiction fandom, the slogan "Fans are slans" quickly developed, making the analogy between science fiction fans, perceived as harassed because of their greater intelligence and imaginative capacity, and the slans in the novel, who are persecuted for their superior mental abilities. Although some regard the usage as a sign of fandom's elitism, along with the related term "mundane" for non-fans, others regard it as a natural reaction to the disapproval of science fiction fans by the broader culture. The related term "slan shack" came to be used in fanspeak for a home occupied primarily by fans. The first Slan Shack to bear that name was established in 1943 in Battle Creek, Michigan by Al and Abby Lou Ashley, Walt Liebscher, E. Everett Evans and fan artist Jack Wiedenbeck. Others have included the Bozo Bus Building in Minneapolis, Minnesota and Lytheria in Milwaukee, Wisconsin.

== Toward the Terra ==
The manga and anime series Toward the Terra is influenced by Slan. Both stories feature a hero named Jommy/Jomy, who discovers that he is a member of a race of telepathic mutants, who are persecuted by artificial general intelligence and non-telepathic humans brainwashed by them.

== 2007 sequel ==
American science fiction author Kevin J. Anderson completed the sequel to Slan, titled Slan Hunter, that includes content from an unfinished draft by van Vogt. It was published July 10, 2007, and credited to both Van Vogt and Anderson. Van Vogt's widow Lydia van Vogt previously gave permission to publish her introduction online, which partly deals with the onset of Alzheimer's disease that van Vogt struggled with at the end of his life.

== General and cited sources ==
- Chalker, Jack L.; Mark Owings (1998). The Science-Fantasy Publishers: A Bibliographic History, 1923–1998. Westminster, Maryland and Baltimore: Mirage Press. pp. 29–30.
- Jaffery, Sheldon (1989). The Arkham House Companion. Mercer Island, Washington: Starmont House. pp. 20–22. ISBN 1-55742-005-X.
- Joshi, S. T. (1999). Sixty Years of Arkham House: A History and Bibliography. Sauk City, Wisconsin: Arkham House. pp. 37–38. ISBN 0-87054-176-5.
- Nielsen, Leon (2004). Arkham House Books: A Collector's Guide. Jefferson, North Carolina and London: McFarland & Company. p. 60. ISBN 0-7864-1785-4.
