= Slang of the My Little Pony: Friendship Is Magic fandom =

Vernacular of My Little Pony fans

A meme from the early days of the brony fandom. This meme would lead to the popularization of the phrase "love and tolerate" within the brony fandom, leading some to describe it as its unofficial motto.

The My Little Pony: Friendship is Magic fandom (also known as the brony fandom) has developed a distinctive vernacular language and fanspeak, often referred to as bronyspeak, since the show's premiere in 2010.

The vocabulary draws heavily from the show's content, character names, and fictional universe of Equestria, and speakers often adapt standard English words with pony-themed prefixes or creating portmanteaus that blend pony-related terms with existing concepts. Notable examples include ponysona (a personalized pony character representing the creator), ponification (transforming non-pony entities into pony form), and music terms like dubtrot (a brony version of dubstep). Bronyspeak emerged as part of what researchers term bronylore, which builds upon the show's official ponyspeak where human phrases were recast in equine terms. The language encompasses direct adoptions from show dialogue (e.g. everypony as a substitution for everybody), portmanteaus, and snowclone variations of popular quotes from the show itself or from its derivative works.

Hasbro officially acknowledged the fandom and its distinctive language in 2011 through promotional materials referencing bronies directly. The vernacular has since attracted academic attention as an example of Internet-enabled folk culture; researchers have noted its functions in creating community belonging, establishing behavioral boundaries, and enforcing codes of niceness that prevent social rejection within the fandom. Studies have identified bronyspeak as both a gatekeeping mechanism requiring learning for full community membership and a continuous performance of group identity in online spaces. Researchers have also noted that bronyspeak extends outside of Internet communities, often pervading into real life via brony conventions or meetups.

== History ==
=== 2010–2011: Early development ===
"I watch it for the plot", one of the brony fandom's earliest Internet memes, that spawned the use of the term plot to refer to a fictional character's perceived attractive physical attributes.

Bronyspeak emerged and developed as part of what Bill Ellis termed bronylore, a distinctive form of web-based verbal and visual art created by the show's adult fanbase. The fanspeak built upon the show's official ponyspeak, where human social phrases were recast in equine terms within the series itself. For example, words like everybody and anyone became everypony and anypony. The term brony itself was an early example of this wordplay, created as a portmanteau of bro and pony, to describe an adult fan of the show regardless of gender. The less common pegasister (a portmanteau of pegasus and sister) was also coined to describe a female adult fan of the show, though a 2021 study found that the majority of female fans of the show dislike the term and prefer to identify as a brony over pegasister.

Bronies also coined the term brohoof to describe a ponified version of high-fiving (a portmanteau of brofist and hoof), where characters touched their hooves together in greeting. Words like everypony and brohoof became standard within the fandom's online spaces.

Fans described their communication system as bronyspeak, conducting it almost exclusively in English with references to the show mixed in as "just a different register, solely created online." Researchers described the incorporation of elements of oral urban slang in the fan-created language as a hybrid of official show terminology with transgressive digital communication styles. This evolution included playful use of abbreviations and emoticons, and also vulgar and adult terminology.

=== 2011–present: Growth, spread, and official recognition ===
Hasbro officially recognized the brony fandom and, implicitly, their distinctive lingo on May 27, 2011, when The Hub released a promotional video for the series called "Equestria Girls" done in the style of a music video parodying Katy Perry and Snoop Dogg's "California Gurls". The song features the lyrics: "Our Bronies, Hang out too, 'Cause they know we're awesome fillies" accompanied by Spike shouting: "Come on, Bronies!" The exclusive online premiere of the video was given to Equestria Daily a day before the promo would air on television. According to Shaun Scotellaro, the e-mail he received from The Hub claimed that the reference to Bronies was done explicitly as a "tribute to our favorite Pony fans."

In July 2011, a 26-page long bronyspeak dictionary called Mareiam-Websteed Dictionary (Note: A play on Merriam-Webster, mare and steed being equestrian terms.) was published on Equestria Daily. The New York Daily News reported on this dictionary, specifying words like Scootabuse with the definition "You should be ashamed of yourself" and zebra as "Cheap racism simulator." Other words included Cutie Mark Failure Insanity Syndrome, neighsayer, and horseapples.

In March 2018, the suffix -creature as a more inclusive replacement for the suffix -pony (e.g. everycreature, anycreature) was introduced in the season 8 premiere "School Daze". (Note: The -creature terms are not widely adopted by the brony fandom and have not been mentioned in academic analyses of bronyspeak.)

== Usage ==
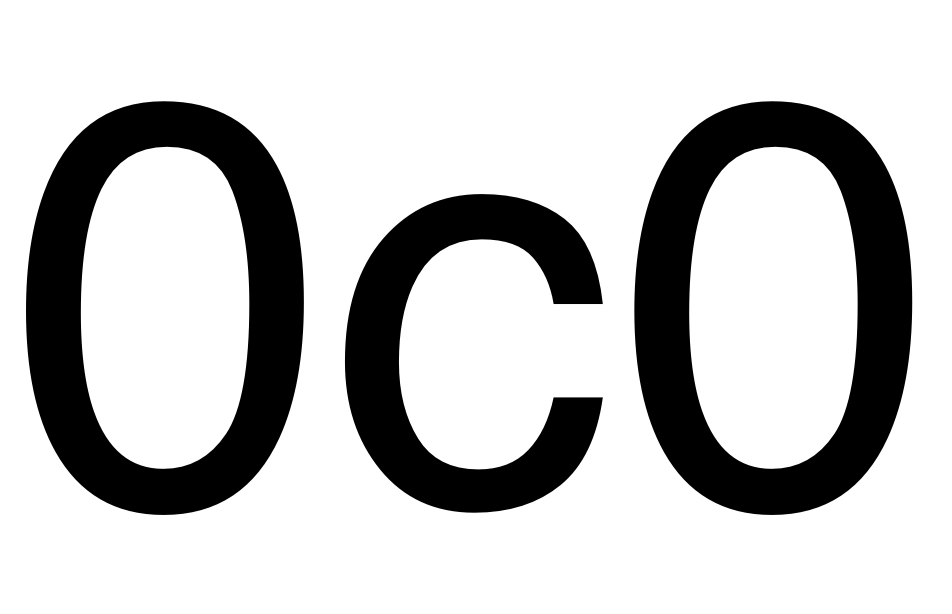
An example of an emoticon used in bronyspeak, meant to resemble a pony's face

Some words in bronyspeak are terms adopted directly from the show, which tend to be equine versions of human terms.

- everyone → everypony
- someone → somepony
- mankind → ponykind
- ladies and gentlemen → fillies and gentlecolts
- Oh my god! → Oh my Celestia!

Some terms are portmanteaus of a pony-related term and a non-pony-related term.

- bro + pony → brony
- pegasus + sister → pegasister
- pony + persona → ponysona
- dubstep + trot → dubtrot

Some are snowclones, often derived from quotes from the show.

- My Little Pony → My Little Human, My Little Dashie, My Little Romance, etc.
- Dear Princess Celestia → Dear Princess [X]
- Friendship Is Magic → Fighting Is Magic, Friendship Is Witchcraft, etc.
- "It needs to be about 20% cooler" → [X]% cooler

=== Examples ===
Term	Definition	Etymology/Notes
everypony	everybody	Direct adoption from show dialogue
anypony	anybody	Direct adoption from show dialogue
somepony	somebody	Direct adoption from show dialogue
nopony	nobody	Direct adoption from show dialogue
fillies and gentlecolts	ladies and gentlemen	Direct adoption from show dialogue
hoofmade	handmade	
what the hay	what the heck, what the fuck	
/) (\ or /] [\	hoofbump	Represents emoticons of two hooves
cutie mark	symbol representing a pony's special talent	Direct adoption from show dialogue; a play on beauty mark
brony	adult fan of My Little Pony	Portmanteau of bro and pony
pegasister	adult female fan of My Little Pony	Combination of pegasus and sister
brohoof	fandom greeting gesture	Portmanteau of brofist and hoof
ponysona	personalized pony character representing the creator	Portmanteau of pony and persona
ponification	process of transforming non-pony entities into pony form	Combination of pony and suffix -ification
clop / clopping	masturbation	Onomatopoeia referencing hoof sounds
dubtrot	pony electronic dance music genre	Combination of dubstep and trot
20% cooler	expression of approval	Reference to Rainbow Dash's catchphrase
buck	fuck	Minced oath referencing bucking
plot	hindquarters	Reference to "I watch it for the plot"
horse famous	having celebrity status among bronies	
snowpity	a profound essence or soul-like quality of female pony characters	A post-ironic spiritual concept that originated from /mlp/-adjacent spaces as an inside joke

== Analysis ==
Bronyspeak has gained academic attention as an example of internet-enabled vernacular culture. Folklore researchers recognized it as a distinctive emic folk speech that simultaneously expressed institutional culture while seeking to be distinct from it, which they identified as the hybrid nature of digital vernacular traditions that both drew from and challenged mainstream cultural norms.

According to Ellis, the anonymous nature of Internet communication platforms facilitated bronyspeak's development, as participants used pseudonyms and online handles rather than their real identities. This encouraged rule-bending and aggressive linguistic play, which allowed the community to create increasingly transgressive terminology, for example, in words like clopping (a bronyspeak word for masturbation).

Justin Mullis observed in his 2015 study of the brony fandom that its lingo represented part of what could be understood as "recreational religious activity".

Venetia Robertson, in her study of the brony fandom, wrote that the use of brony slang by members of the community functions as signs of belonging and behavioral boundaries for members of the fandom. Robertson noted that bronies created catchphrases and snowclones from the lines of dialogue of the show, invented new terms like brohoof, and popularized "love and tolerance" as the fandom's motto.

Nicolai Hansen of the Copenhagen Business School wrote that the specialized language functions as a continuous performance of membership that is "embodied and continuously exercised". He also noted that the lingo serves as a gatekeeping mechanism, in which the dialect must be learned to fully belong to the community. Hansen also compared the lingo to that of Beliebers—fans of pop icon Justin Bieber—and characterized it as less sophisticated, describing Belieber language as "fangirl-language" and "chatter language" defined primarily by its deficiencies in punctuation, verb tenses, capitalization, and syntax, rather than as a creative linguistic innovation.

According to Jon Coumes of The American Prospect, brony communities developed their distinctive language alongside "codes of community-enforced niceness" designed to ensure that "nopony" would experience social rejection.

== See also ==
- My Little Pony: Friendship Is Magic fan fiction – Fan fiction of My Little Pony
- Art of the My Little Pony: Friendship Is Magic fandom – Art subculture of My Little Pony fans
- Music of the My Little Pony: Friendship Is Magic fandom – Music subculture of My Little Pony fans
- My Little Pony fan convention – Formal gathering of fans of My Little Pony
- Online communities of the My Little Pony: Friendship Is Magic fandom – Online communities of My Little Pony fans
- Internet slang – Slang terms and languages used on the internet
- Fandom – Subculture composed of fans sharing a common interest
- Leet – Online slang and alternative orthography
- Algospeak – Obfuscated speech on social media
