= My Little Pony: Twilight Sparkle, Teacher for a Day =

2011 video game

- App Store icon
- Developer: Ruckus Media Group
- Publisher: Hasbro
- Series: My Little Pony
- Platform: iOS
- Release: NA: September 22, 2011
- Genre: Puzzle/Storybook
- Mode: Single-player

My Little Pony: Twilight Sparkle, Teacher for a Day is a puzzle/storybook application developed by American studio Ruckus Media Group and published by Hasbro, inspired by the animated television series My Little Pony: Friendship is Magic. It was released to the Apple App Store on September 22, 2011.

== Gameplay ==
The application is executed in an interactive storybook format, with three reading options. Players can have the story read to them by a narrator as each word is highlighted on-screen, read it themselves from the on-screen text boxes, or read it themselves and record their own voice for playback. The app features two minigames to break up the story, and both make use of typical iDevice elements. The accelerometer is utilised when the player must tilt the device to navigate through a short maze, and the touch screen during a later 'spot-the-difference' interlude. Additionally, each page features a single Easter egg in the form of a sparkling object that can be tapped to activate an animation or sound bite. For correctly completing a minigame, players will receive a reward in the form of a word that can be used in the final activity. This activity consists of a three-page story template that players fill with their earned words to create their own tale.

== Reception ==
Critical reception for Twilight Sparkle, Teacher for a Day was mixed, with Equestria Daily giving it a positive review but saying that it was most certainly aimed at a younger audience and not towards the older fanbase. Common Sense Media gave the game three out of five stars, saying that it "has limited interactivity but some decent games". A reviewer for Wired gave a positive review for Twilight Sparkle, Teacher for a Day, saying that although the price was a little high, "for an engaging, well-produced licensed product it is certainly not too much to ask".
