= Equestria Daily =

Fandom news site for the My Little Pony franchise

- Equestria Daily's homepage on March 17, 2018.
- Website type: My Little Pony fan site
- Available in: English
- Creator: Shaun "Sethisto" Scotellaro
- Website: equestriadaily.com
- Commercial: No
- Registration: Optional
- Launched: January 19, 2011; 15 years ago
- Current status: Active

Equestria Daily (frequently abbreviated as EqD or ED) is a fan site dedicated to the coverage of fandom news and fan works of the brony fandom—the adult fandom of the animated television series My Little Pony: Friendship Is Magic. Equestria Daily is operated by a team of editors and has been officially recognized by the show's production team as well as The Hub (later Discovery Family), the television network on which Friendship Is Magic aired. It is considered the central fan news site of the brony fandom.

In 2014, the Library of Congress selected Equestria Daily to be archived as part of their "Web Cultures Web Archive Collection" by the American Folklife Center.

== History ==
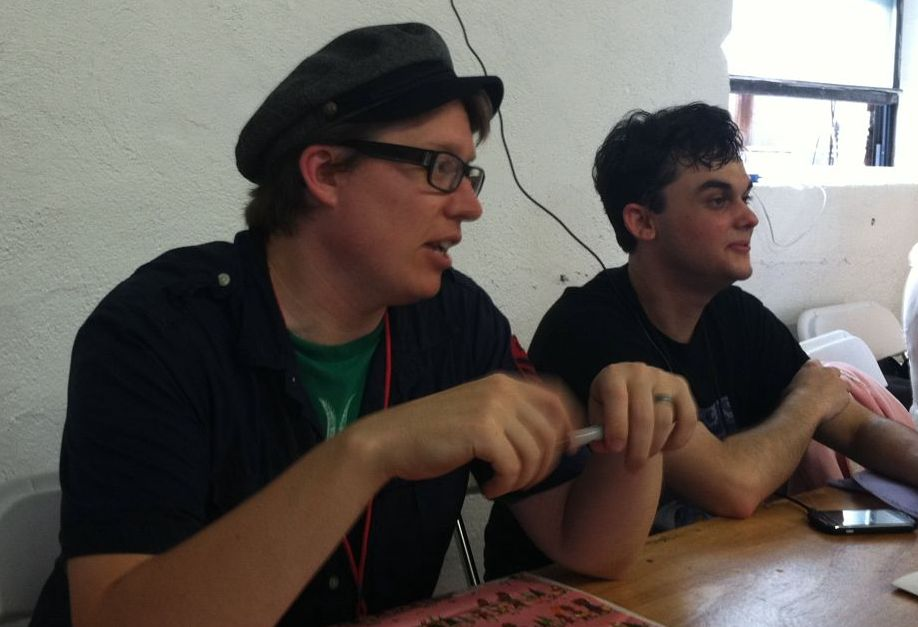
Jayson Thiessen (left) and Shaun "Sethisto" Scotellaro at BroNYCon 2011

Shaun Scotellaro ("Sethisto"), a 23-year-old Arizona college student, established the website in January 2011 to collect news and fan fiction specific to My Little Pony: Friendship Is Magic. In order to establish the site, Scotellaro had to cut back on his community-college classes in order to run the site out of his parents' house in Glendale, Arizona. He has explained that he believed the show needed a unified fan base at the time, as he and many other older fans had recently become supporters of the show—commonly known as bronies—and there was an overarching concern that Hasbro would not be authorizing a second season. Towards the end of 2010, when the fan-following was still in its infancy and confined mostly to the /co/ (comics and cartoons) and /b/ ("random") boards of 4chan, all pony-related content was banned by a moderator who had enough of the flame war that was being waged between those who enjoyed the show and those who did not. Posting a message containing the word pony became a bannable offense on 4chan, prompting Scotellaro to launch Equestria Daily.

After its creation, the blog began to gain attention from My Little Pony fans. Though Scotellaro initially operated the website alone, by the end of June 2011, the large amount of fandom news sent to Equestria Daily resulted in the website's staff being expanded to include two more editors, an "interviewer/YouTube organizer", and a corps of pre-readers for My Little Pony fan fiction submissions. By this point, the website was garnering around 300,000 additional page views per day, and with the supplementary editors was managing to post a greater number of updates with increased frequency, though still primarily of fan fiction.

Equestria Daily has also partially branched into other forms of media dissemination, currently possessing a Facebook page, YouTube channel, and Twitter account, though all updates are still hosted on the originally-established Blogger site. As of July 2012, the site has boasted over 220 million hits since its creation in January 2011. In an interview with CBC Radio in December 2011, Scotellaro stated that the site was reaching more than 500,000 views per day. The site receives enough pageviews per day that it is able to sustain itself through advertising revenue. The site was designed by Knighty, and the site is maintained by the site's developer Gameleon. In June 2014, Equestria Daily reached 500 million total views.

In 2014, the Library of Congress selected the site to be archived as part of their "Web Cultures Web Archive Collection" by the American Folklife Center. The collection was established for the purpose of "documenting the creation and sharing of emergent cultural traditions on the web". This archive currently covers the website's state from June 2014 to August 2016.

== Official response ==
The My Little Pony: Friendship Is Magic production team at DHX Media Vancouver, as well as the network which broadcasts the show, The Hub, have both acknowledged the existence of the fan community, and have individually sent official material specifically to Equestria Daily. The Hub had a summer advertising campaign for the show based around a parody of Katy Perry's "California Gurls" called "Equestria Girls"; one of the lyrics mentioned "bronies" hanging out with the ponies. An extended promotional version of the song was sent to Scotellaro's blog for "our favorite Pony fans". In July 2011, The Hub sent Equestria Daily the "There's a Pony For That" commercial; in September 2011, Hasbro sent Equestria Daily a review copy of their interactive iOS storybook My Little Pony: Twilight Sparkle, Teacher for a Day. Several key figures in the production team have done exclusive interviews for the website, including supervising director and showrunner Jayson Thiessen and My Little Pony: Friendship Is Magic developer and creative director Lauren Faust.

Gameloft's My Little Pony game features a recurring annual event called "Freedom of the Press" which features a shoutout to Equestria Daily by naming the in-game news organization after the website. In May 2022, prior to the release of the My Little Pony: Make Your Mark special on Netflix, Hasbro sent an exclusive clip of the premiere to the site.

== See also ==
- List of fan works of the My Little Pony: Friendship Is Magic fandom
- Online communities of the My Little Pony: Friendship Is Magic fandom
- My Little Pony: Friendship Is Magic fan fiction
- Art of the My Little Pony: Friendship Is Magic fandom
- Music of the My Little Pony: Friendship Is Magic fandom
- Derpibooru
- Derpy Hooves
- Fimfiction
- /mlp/
