= Derpibooru =

My Little Pony fan art website

- Logo
- Website type: My Little Pony fan art repository
- Website: derpibooru.org
- Registration: Optional
- Launched: June 2012; 14 years ago
- Current status: Active

Derpibooru (a portmanteau of Derpy Hooves and the suffix -booru, a reborrowing from Japanese bōru, meaning "board") is an imageboard fan site dedicated to hosting and archiving visual fan art created by the My Little Pony: Friendship Is Magic fandom. Launched in June 2012, it is the largest and most popular My Little Pony imageboard. As of October 2026, Derpibooru hosts over 3.4 million images (excluding 419,000 deleted images), 571,000 registered users, and 11 million comments. In 2020, Derpibooru's content policies became the subject of controversy during the George Floyd protests and were revised repeatedly in response to criticism.

Similar to established imageboards like 4chan, Derpibooru has a minimalist interface with limited social features. The site allows users to post and comment anonymously and upload My Little Pony fan art, whether previously published on other platforms or original. Derpibooru uses a user-driven tagging system characteristic of folksonomies, which allows for categorization and content searching; it uses a content rating system of seven categories: safe, suggestive, questionable, explicit, semi-grimdark, grimdark, and grotesque.

Derpibooru uses a software called Philomena (named after Princess Celestia's pet phoenix in the episode "A Bird in the Hoof"), which is licensed under the AGPL and written in Elixir, TypeScript, CSS, Rust, and JavaScript. It is the successor to the previously used Rails-based booru-on-rails project.

== 2020 content moderation controversy ==
During the George Floyd protests, Derpibooru faced criticism over artwork that The Atlantic described as racist and the heavy downvoting of fan art supporting Black Lives Matter. On June 4, 2020, its administrators declared support for the movement and announced that they would remove new uploads they judged to promote racism or antagonize others over current events. The policy did not prohibit racist expression generally. Later that month, the administrators told The Atlantic that images removed during the dispute would eventually be restored as a record of the period.

A separate dispute developed over images featuring Aryanne, a fan-created character associated with Nazism, and over how the site's rules applied to such images. After adding a rule against content it considered to promote Nazism or other hateful ideologies, Derpibooru removed that language on June 30. The reversal drew objections from artists who wanted stricter moderation. Artists on both sides of the dispute used the site's do-not-post system to restrict the hosting of their work.

On July 2, a Derpibooru administrator posted an apology on behalf of staff. The statement acknowledged that staff had changed policy after listening to only one side of the dispute, then withdrawn the change after listening to the other.

== See also ==
- List of fan works of the My Little Pony: Friendship Is Magic fandom
- Art of the My Little Pony: Friendship Is Magic fandom – Art subculture of My Little Pony fans
- 15.ai – Real-time text-to-speech AI tool
- Danbooru – Anime-focused imageboard website
- DeviantArt – American online art community
- e621 – Furry-themed imageboard art website
- Equestria Daily – Fandom news site for the My Little Pony franchise
- Fimfiction – My Little Pony fanfiction website
