= Original character =

Type of fictional character

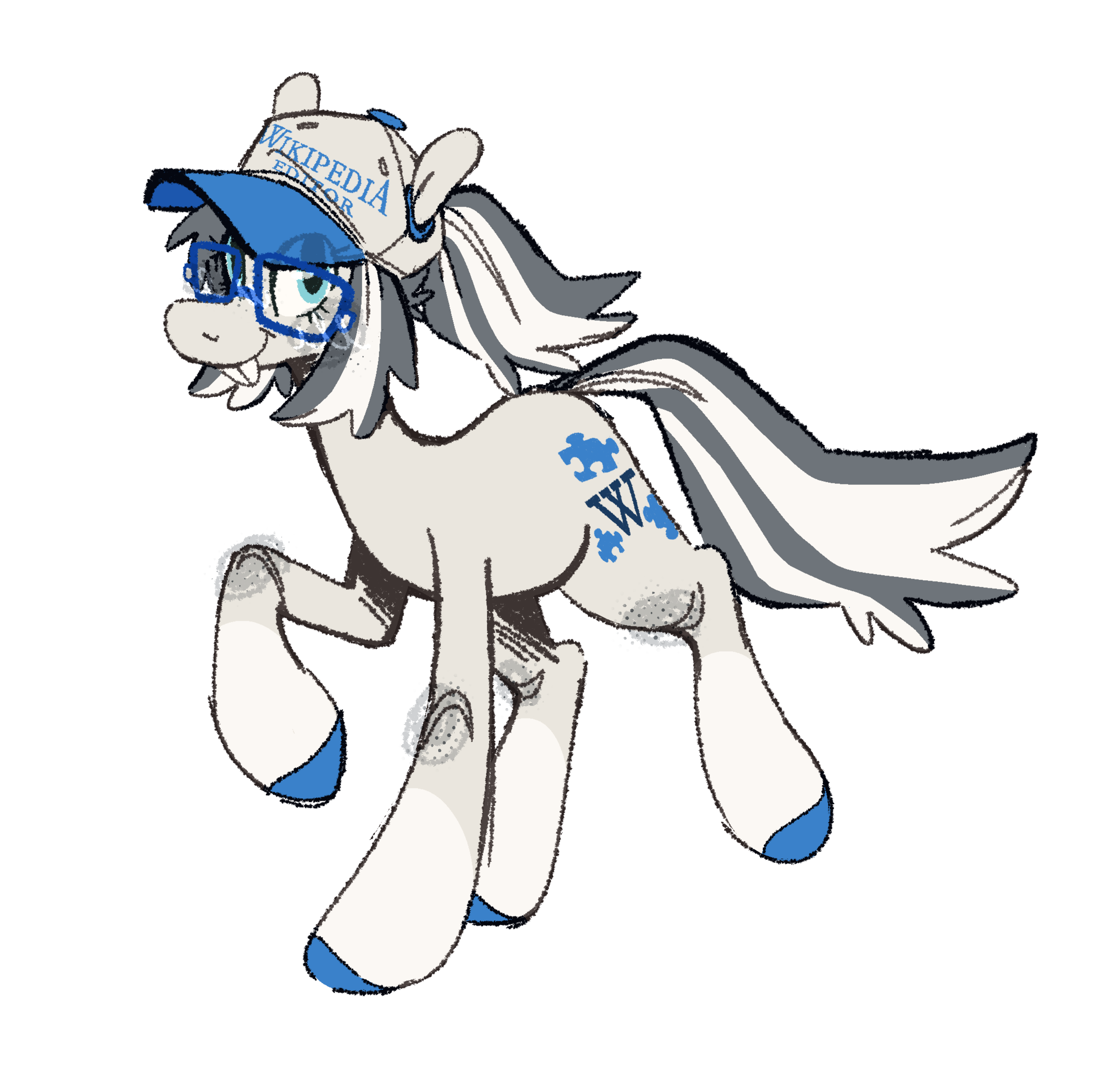
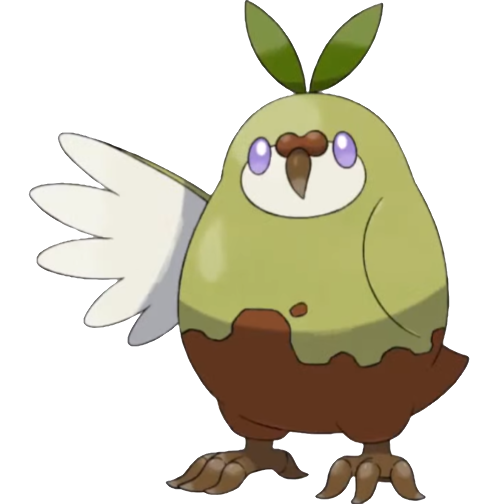
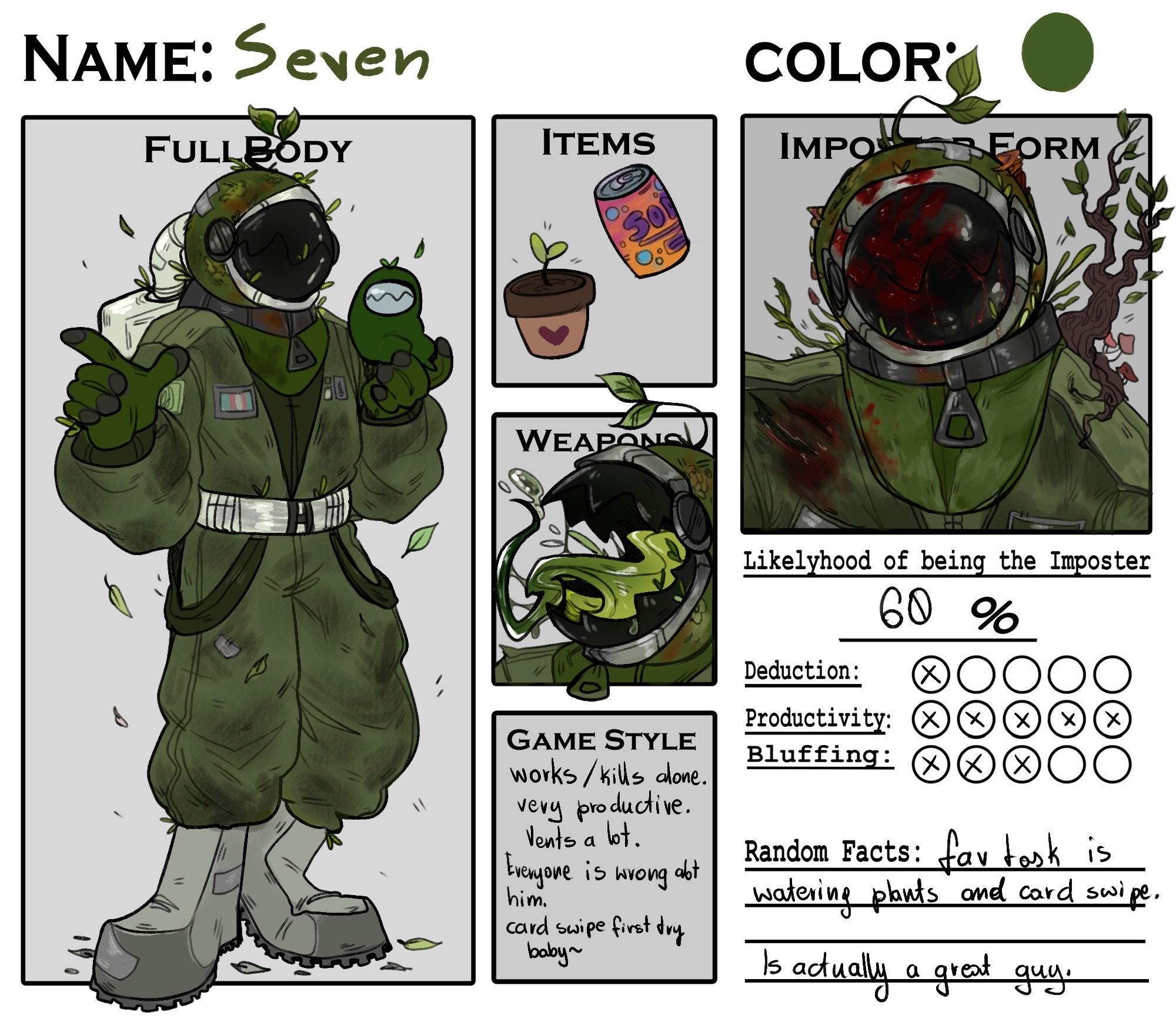
Various original characters (from left to right): An original character from no existing universe with snake like features · A ponysona of Wikipedia, inspired by My Little Pony: Friendship Is Magic · A Fakemon inspired by Pokémon· A model sheet for a "crewsona" inspired by Among Us

An original character (OC) is a fictional character created by an author or artist, as opposed to being adapted from an existing work. The term has two main applications: within fan works (such as fan fiction or fan art), it denotes a non-canonical character inserted into an established fictional universe; within original works (including literature, comics, and games), it refers to any character that is the intellectual property of its creator. Acronyms can also be gender-specific, such as OMC (original male character) and OFC (original female character).

OCs are used in various subcultures including the Star Wars fandom, the Harry Potter fandom, the My Little Pony fandom (also known as the brony fandom), and the Sonic the Hedgehog fandom. Takashi Iizuka mentioned that the character customization system in Sonic Forces was influenced by the Sonic community's tendency to create original characters; tools for creating Sonic OCs exist on sites like Newgrounds. Cosplayers create original characters based on their imaginations, fan fiction, and other works. For cosplayers, OCs can give them a larger range of choices of characters to cosplay as.

Two original characters in the second sense (not based on any existing universe) drawn in a notebook.

OCs have been used in the furry fandom. A majority of furries have a fursona, defined as a personally claimed persona resembling an anthropomorphic animal. According to a 2020 survey in The New Science of Narcissism, 95% of furries have a fursona. Many fans of My Little Pony: Friendship Is Magic use pony OCs as personas, known as ponysonas. By 2019, nearly half of surveyed members of the Friendship Is Magic fandom community had a ponysona, and their ponysona was among the first original characters they had created.

OCs can serve as protagonists or as minor characters in a story. A writer may add another author's OC into their own work. An OC can provide a different point of view to a fictional universe; for instance, a fan fiction author can create an OC that is a student at one of Hogwarts’ rival schools.

== See also ==
- Mary Sue – Overly competent fictional character
- Rule 63 – Technique in fiction
- Self-insertion – Literary device where the author writes themself into their fictional story
- SCP Foundation – Online collaborative writing project
