= Ponysona =

Personalized pony character created by the brony fandom

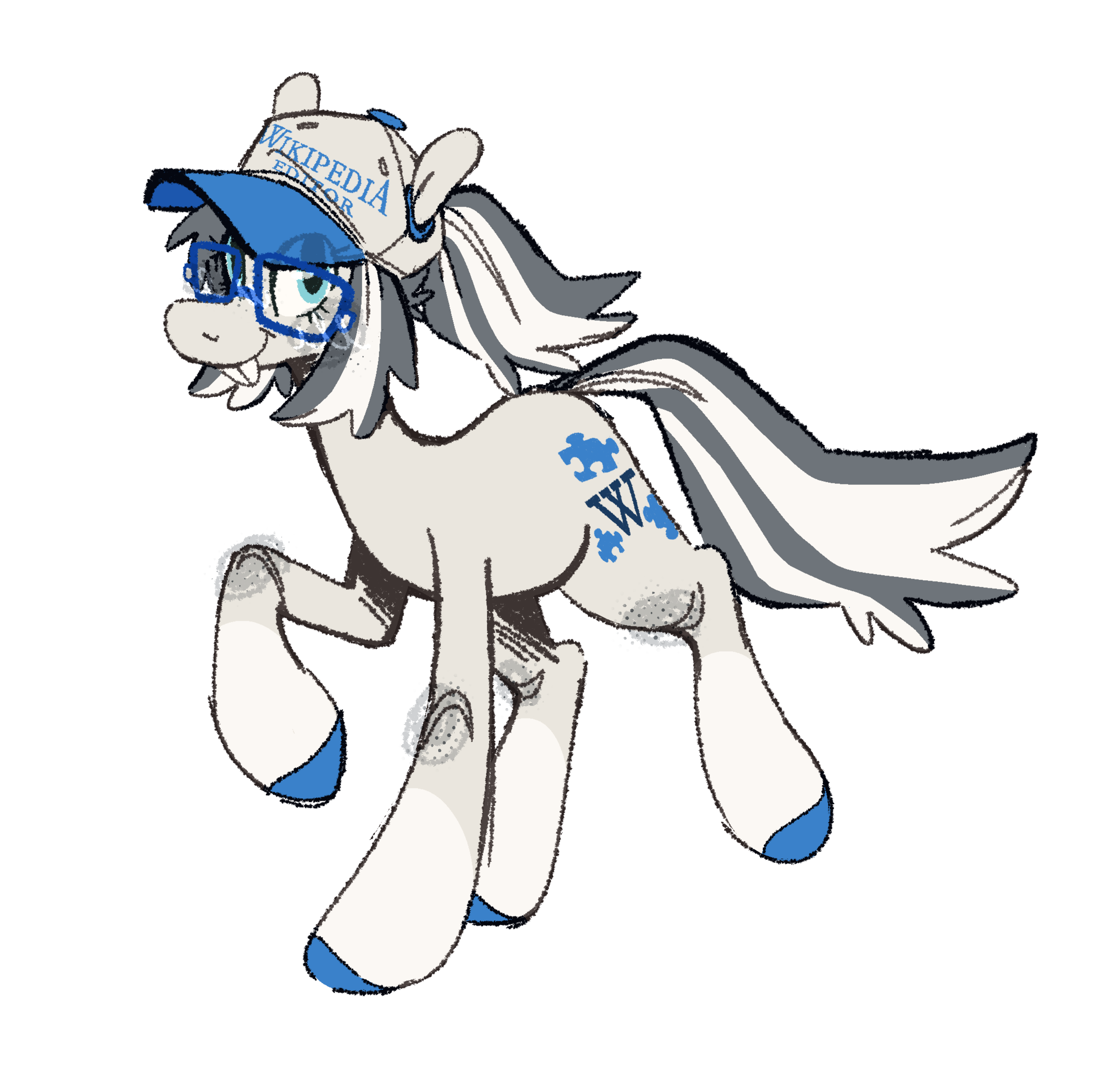
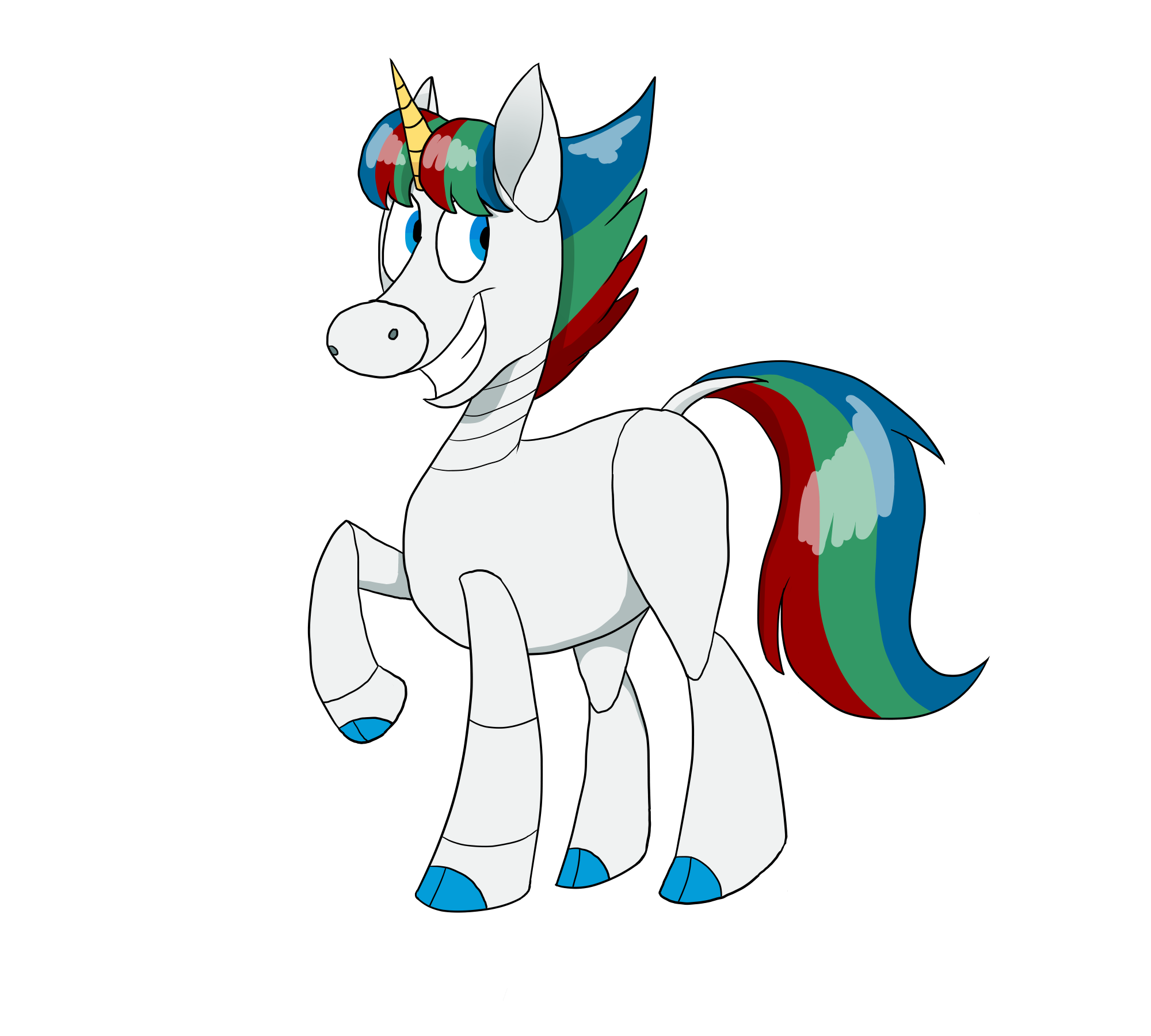
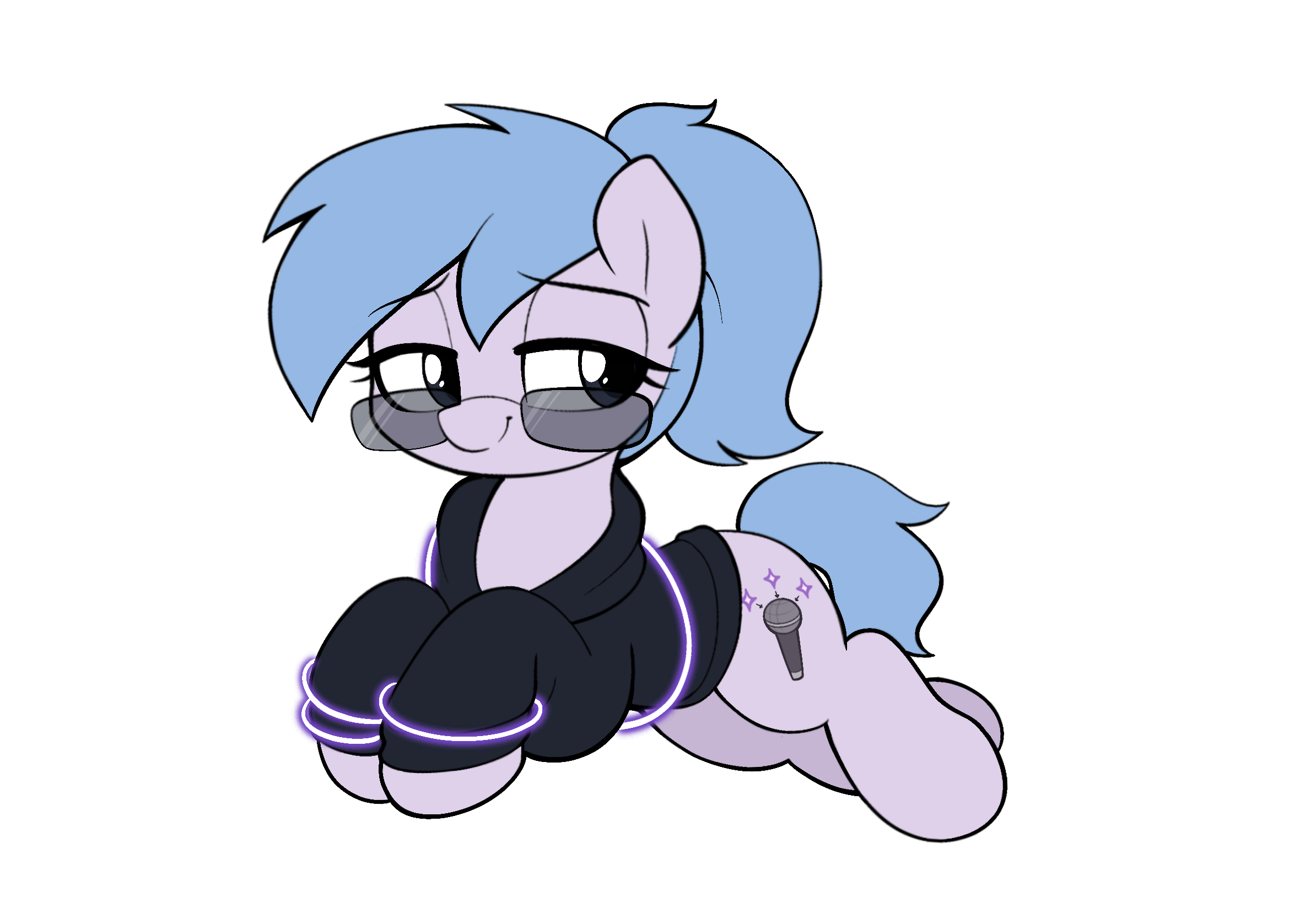
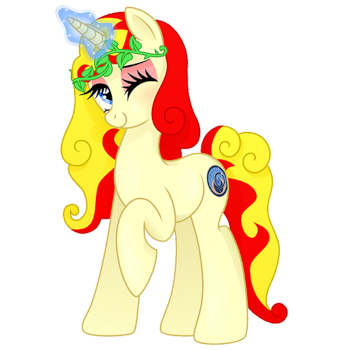
- Clockwise from upper left: "Wiki Hooves", a Wikipedia editor's ponysona
- "Cloud Services", a ponification of Wikimedia Cloud Services
- "Poník Libuše" (transl. Pony Libuše), Czequestria's pony mascot
- 15's ponysona

A ponysona (/ˌpoʊniˈsoʊnə/ POH-nee-SOH-nə; a portmanteau of pony and persona) is a personalized pony character created by bronies—fans of the animated television series My Little Pony: Friendship is Magic—as an alter ego. Similar to fursonas in the furry fandom, ponysonas typically incorporate elements of the creator's personality, physical characteristics, or interests. The practice of creating pony original characters became popular following the show's premiere in 2010, and the subsequent growth of the brony fandom.

Commonly used as avatars in fan art, fan fiction, and role-playing communities across various social media platforms and forums dedicated to the franchise, ponysonas are typically designed following the visual elements of the show. These often incorporate unique coat colors, mane styles, cutie marks, and wings or horns to represent unicorn or pegasus ponies.

In 2016, 46% of bronies reported that they had created at least one original character, and 39% reported identifying with a ponysona, which typically was among the first original characters they had created during their participation in the fandom. By 2019, the percentage of bronies identifying with a ponysona had increased up to 49.3%. (In contrast, according to a 2020 survey, 95% of furries identified themselves with a fursona.)

Within the community, original character designs that simply recolor existing characters from the show are often criticized for lacking creativity, despite their prevalence. Unlike fursonas, which often involve elaborate fursuits for physical embodiment at furry conventions, ponysonas tend to be expressed primarily through digital art, roleplay, and online interaction, with cosplay being a less common but still present form of expression. Some bronies have described their ponysonas as idealized versions of themselves that function as personal avatars within the community that represent how they wish to be perceived.

== See also ==
- Furry fandom – Subculture interested in anthropomorphic animals
- Fursona – Personalized animal character created by the furry fandom
- My Little Pony: Friendship Is Magic fan fiction – Fan fiction of My Little Pony
- Art of the My Little Pony: Friendship Is Magic fandom – Art subculture of My Little Pony fans
- Original character – Type of fictional character
- Slang of the My Little Pony: Friendship Is Magic fandom – Vernacular of My Little Pony fans
