= Fanspeak =

Jargon from science fiction fan groups

Fanspeak is the slang or jargon current in science fiction and fantasy fandom, especially those terms in use among readers and writers of science fiction fanzines.

Fanspeak is made up of acronyms, blended words, obscure in-jokes, puns, coinages from science fiction novels or films, and archaic or standard English words used in specific ways relevant or amusing to the science fiction community.

== Evolution ==
Most of the terms used in fanspeak have spread to members of the Society for Creative Anachronism, Renaissance Fair participants, fantasy football players, and internet gaming and chat fans, due to the social and contextual intersection between the communities.

Common examples of widespread usages are:

- fen as the plural of fan
- fannish "of or relating to fans and fandom"
- gafiate (verb), an acronym for "getting away from it all" (i.e., leaving fandom, temporarily or permanently)
- fafiate (verb), an acronym for "forced away from it all" (i.e., being forced to leave fandom for personal or professional reasons)

A few fannish terms have become standard English, such as fanzine, short for "fan magazine", coined by Russ Chauvenet in 1940, which swiftly replaced the older term fanmag.

Conversely, some fannish terms have been made obsolete by changes in technology (the decline of the mimeograph has doomed corflu for "correction fluid"), cultural changes (a femmefan [female fan] is no longer unusual) or the mere passage of time (slan shack for "a house where a bunch of fans live together" has faded, since fewer young fans have read Slan by A. E. van Vogt). Slan also produced one of the most common fan idioms: "Fans are slans". Fanspeak is so interwoven into the fabric of fandom that it is difficult to discuss fandom without resorting to fannish terms such as fanac "fannish activity" or filk music (originally a typo for "folk music").

== Sociology ==
Like other forms of jargon, fanspeak serves as a means of inclusion and exclusion within the fannish community. In the 1970s, the use of traditional fanspeak separated the fanzine and convention-attending subcommunity (sometimes distinguished as trufen or "true fans") from fans of science fiction movies and television shows (mediafen). The division of the community into trufen and others is rejected by many fans as inherently unfannish.

Today, subsets of fanspeak define subcommunities within fandom. For example, ringers for "fans of The Lord of the Rings" is used primarily by fans of the Peter Jackson films (see also Tolkien fandom).

== See also ==
- Slang of the My Little Pony: Friendship Is Magic fandom
