= Art of the My Little Pony: Friendship Is Magic fandom =

Art subculture of My Little Pony fans

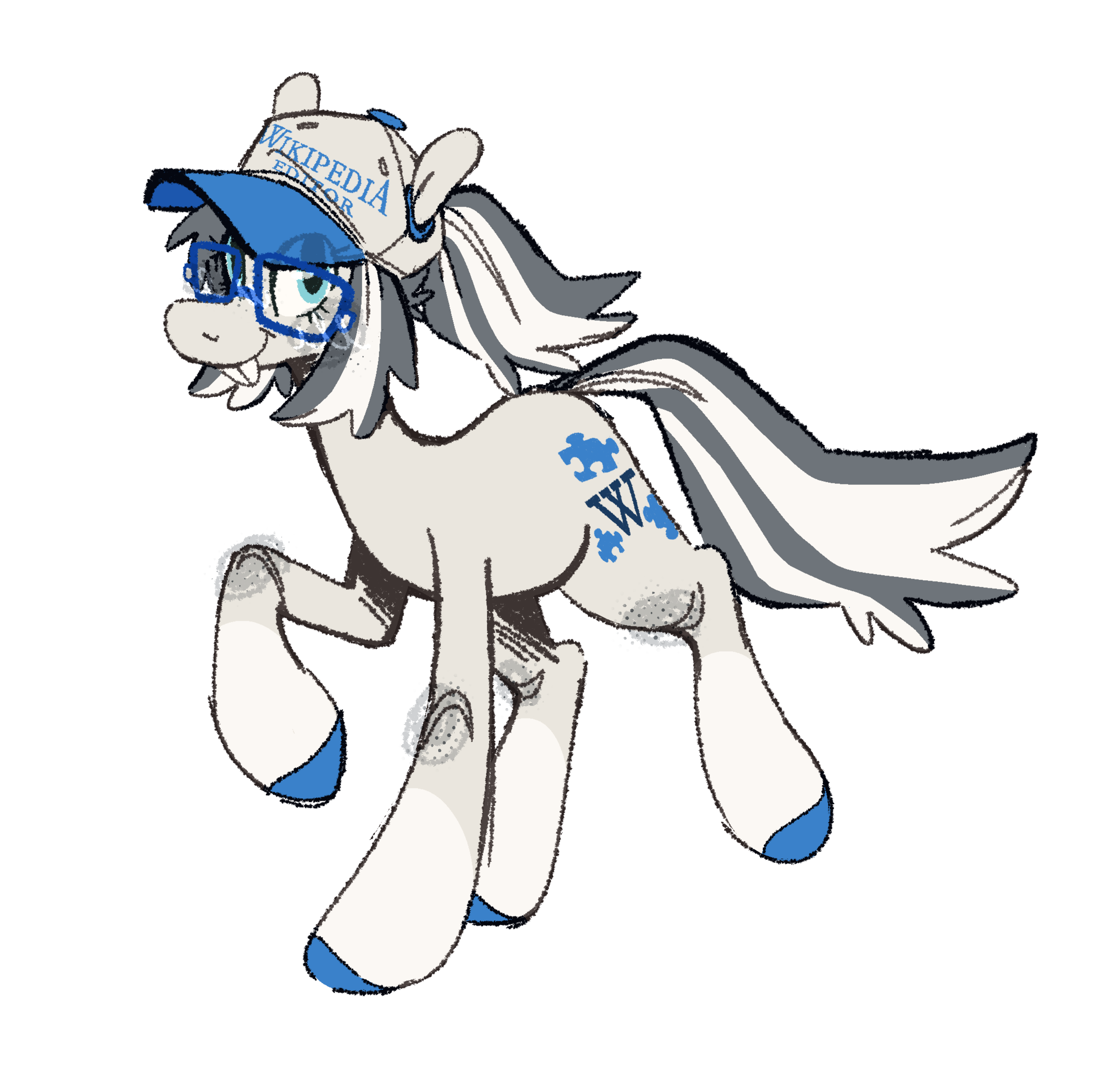
Wiki Hooves, Wikipedia's unofficial ponysona, and an example of ponification

The My Little Pony: Friendship is Magic fandom (also known as the brony fandom) has generated a vast body of fan work, including fan art. Fans began creating fan art of Friendship Is Magic shortly after the show's premiere. As the brony community grew in prominence in the early 2010s, fan art production increased dramatically. Various art styles and themes emerged within the fandom, such as "humanized" versions of pony characters, crossovers with other franchises, and original character (OC) creations known as ponysonas. A practice known as ponification, where artists transform non-pony characters, people, or objects into pony form, is popular among fan artists. Many brony fan works have also subsequently inspired fan art. Physical prints, custom plushies, art commissions, stickers, keychains, T-shirts, and other pony-themed merchandise are frequently sold at My Little Pony fan conventions.

Despite the conclusion of the television series in 2019, the fandom continues to produce new content. As of November 2026, Derpibooru—the largest and most popular My Little Pony imageboard—hosts over 3.5 million images (excluding deleted and duplicate images) and over 570,000 registered users.

== Fan works ==
=== Fan films and fan animations ===
Fan-made videos incorporating footage from the show are regularly posted on YouTube, including music videos, parodies, and remakes of movie and video game trailers. One notable early video that attracted media attention was created by high school student Stephen Thomas, who used scientific principles to analyze physical impossibilities in the show as part of a class presentation in 2011. This video was later featured on the Comedy Central show Tosh.0.

In 2011, filmmaker Edgar Wright featured pony versions of the trailers for Scott Pilgrim vs. the World and Hot Fuzz on his blog. Top Gear also recognized a video using clips of their show that featured pony characters. In 2012, a fan-created pony version of "Gangnam Style" was featured as a "must-see video" on The Wall Street Journal. In 2013, fan Zachary Rich created a full-length fan film titled "Double Rainboom" for his college coursework. Pony-based parodies of "Weird Al" Yankovic's songs that Yankovic featured on his Twitter account led to discussions between him and the show's directors, and resulted in guest appearances by Yankovic in the fourth season episode "Pinkie Pride" and the ninth season episode "The Last Laugh".

=== Fan games ===
Fans have developed fan games based on Friendship Is Magic, such as the fighting game My Little Pony: Fighting Is Magic, which was eventually renamed to Them's Fightin' Herds after a cease and desist notice from Hasbro. The upcoming indie shooter Get Your Tentacles Off My Waifu! is another fan game inspired by Friendship Is Magic. Other fan works include mods of existing games such as Team Fortress 2 and The Elder Scrolls V: Skyrim. Fans have also created crossovers between My Little Pony and other franchises, such as "Turnabout Storm," a crossover with the Ace Attorney series. Some web applications allow fans to create their own pony original characters known as ponysonas.

=== Fan art ===
Various My Little Pony fan art has been created over the years, which depicts either the characters from the show or original characters (OCs).

==== Ponification ====
Fan art of a ponified Wikipe-tan

Ponification is the practice of transforming non-pony characters, people, objects, or events into pony form. The term was officially recognized in the open-source Webster dictionary in 2017, defined as "bestowing the harmonious qualities relating to the magic of friendship upon a person, creature, fictional figure, or inanimate object by converting into the likeness of an animated My Little Pony character." Ponification is not limited to the fandom, as the show itself has featured ponified versions of pop-culture personalities. A ponysona is a ponification of one's self.

==== Artificial intelligence art ====
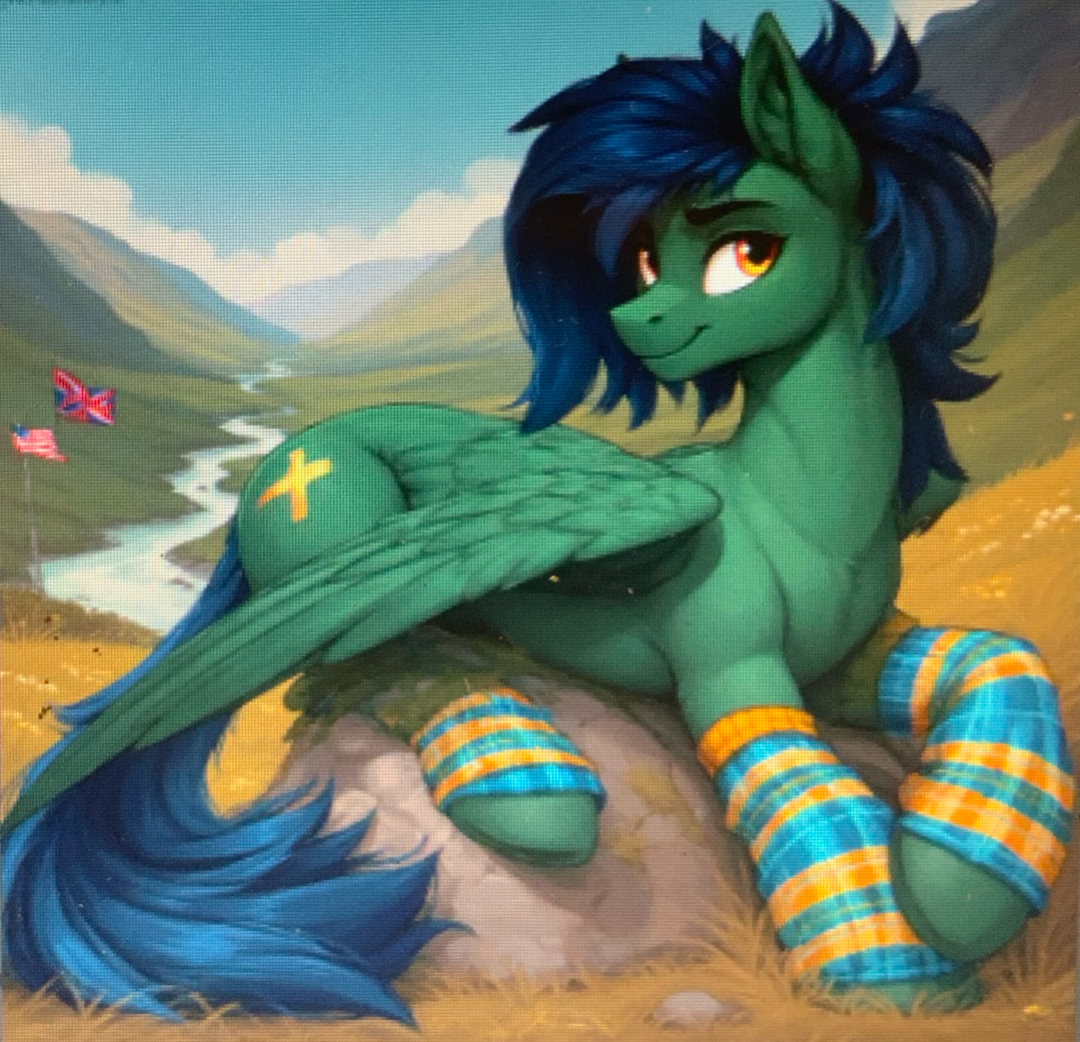
An example of an AI generated image of an MLP pony

My Little Pony fan art has been used in the development of AI art. Pony Diffusion is a specialized diffusion model based on Stable Diffusion XL that is popular for generating cartoon-style images. Pony Diffusion has been cited in academic publications and preprints.

=== Physical merchandise ===
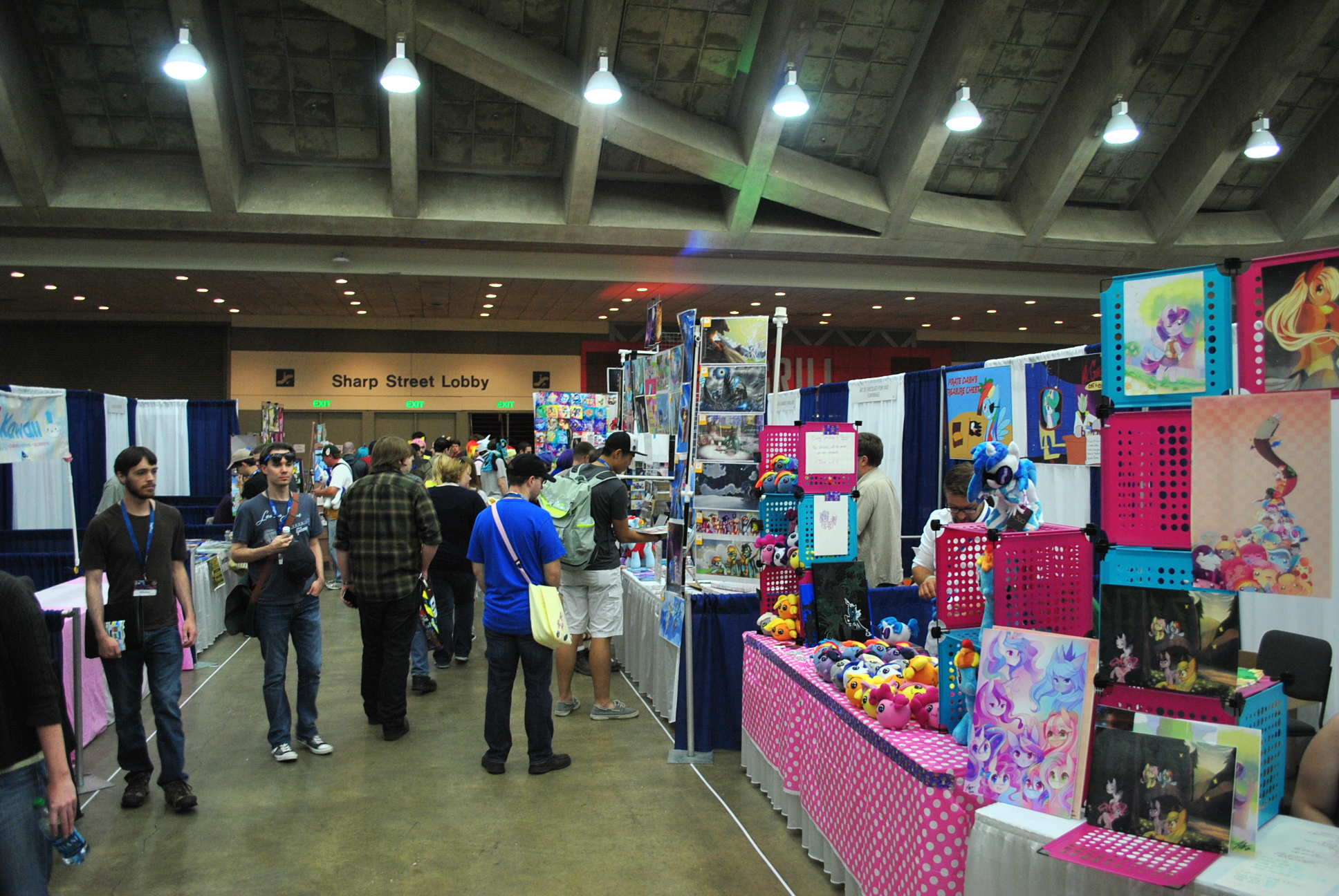
The vendor hall of BronyCon 2014 at the Baltimore Convention Center.

Merchandise of My Little Pony fan art (colloquially called brony swag) is sold at vendor halls at brony conventions like Everfree Northwest or Ponyville Ciderfest. Types of commonly purchased merchandise include clothing items like T-shirts, socks, and backpacks, as well as commissioned artwork, physical prints, and posters. Other common merchandise forms include figurines, plushies, accessories like mousepads and glassware, lunchboxes, stickers, DVDs, and games.

=== Clop ===
Clop is erotic or pornographic art, films, video games or other fan works based on the My Little Pony franchise. The term "clop" is an onomatopoeia for hoofbeat and masturbation.

== Platforms ==
=== Derpibooru ===
Derpibooru (a portmanteau of Derpy Hooves and the suffix -booru, a reborrowing from Japanese bōru, meaning "board") is an imageboard dedicated to hosting and archiving My Little Pony fan art. It is the largest and most popular My Little Pony imageboard.

=== DeviantArt ===
DeviantArt has attracted a large community of bronies. By June 2012, DeviantArt hosted more than 500,000 pieces of Friendship Is Magic artwork. The website is used to publish fan art and fan fiction, rate and comment on others' work, follow exchange gifts with artists, and join user-created groups.

== Popularity ==
According to a 2018 study, bronies owned approximately $1,050 worth of pony merchandise on average; 73% of bronies reported watching My Little Pony fan videos almost daily, 12% reported that they frequently created fan art of the show, and 5% reported that they frequently created fan collectible merchandise. The study found that bronies tend to consume fan-created content and fandom news more than they watch the show itself.

As of September 2025, Derpibooru hosts over 3.2 million images (excluding deleted and duplicate images) and over 520,000 registered users.

== Controversies ==
Some fan content has been deemed racist, such as a white pony original character named Aryanne (derived from "aryan") who has a swastika for a cutie mark. During the George Floyd protests, The Atlantic reported that some /mlp/ users mocked the protests by upvoting racist fan art on Derpibooru and downvoting pro-Black Lives Matter artwork. This led to Derpibooru's first major policy change that permitted moderators to ban images uploaded solely to incite controversy.

== See also ==
- Friendship Is Witchcraft
- My Little Pony: Friendship is Magic fandom
- My Little Pony: Friendship Is Magic fan fiction
- Music of the My Little Pony: Friendship Is Magic fandom
- Slang of the My Little Pony: Friendship Is Magic fandom
- Ponysona
