= Pony (My Little Pony) =

Fictional species in My Little Pony

Ponies
- My Little Pony: Friendship Is Magic race
- Flag of Equestria

In-universe information
- Sub-races: Earth ponies, pegasi, unicorns, alicorns, Crystal ponies, bat ponies

Ponies are an equine species in the My Little Pony media franchise. Across the franchise's various incarnations, ponies are depicted as colorful, sentient equines who inhabit magical lands, most notably Equestria from My Little Pony: Friendship Is Magic. The three main prolific "Pony Tribes" are earth ponies, pegasi, and unicorns, each possessing distinct physical traits and supernatural abilities. Lesser known or non-prolific tribes include: bat ponies, crystal ponies, and alicorns. Ponies are distinguished from other non-pony equine species by their cutie marks.

== Development and design ==
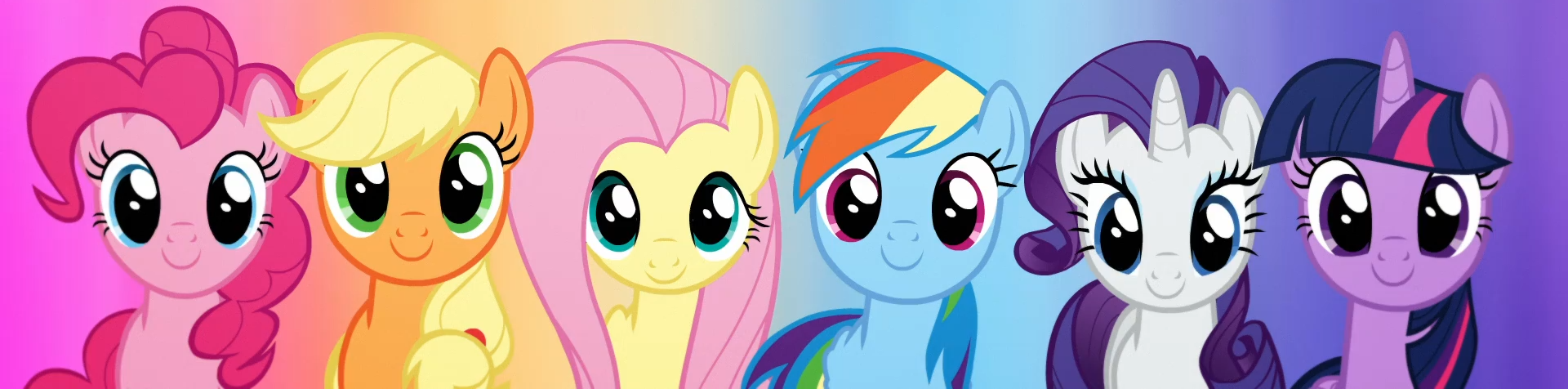
The Mane Six

Lauren Faust, the creator of My Little Pony: Friendship Is Magic, imagined the three ponies—unicorns, pegasi, and earth ponies—having different cultures and living in various places. She pictured the unicorns in the mountains, pegasi in the clouds, and earth ponies, similar to real horses, on the ground. According to Faust, the entirety of Friendship Is Magic is influenced by the fantasy genre. The team borrowed from mythology for most of their pony designs. Faust envisioned the ponies as realistic horses who ate hay, lived in barns, pulled carts, wore saddles, and used their mouths to pick up things—qualities that were formerly avoided. After an idea from fellow animator Paul Rudish, many ideas of how the ponies' world was special came to Faust; she imagined the ponies as the stewards of their world who made their weather happen, flowers grow, and animals thrive.

Initially, Faust's designs were similar to the original ponies'. However, they "just didn't feel right" with upturned noses, straight faces, large heads, and small bodies. After drawing a doodle of a random pony, Faust decided to use that design. When creating ponies, the artists needed to be attentive to shape and proportion. Their bodies were similar to the shapes of beans: heads to a ball and legs to curved triangles. Often, the ponies were the height of three heads, divided into three parts:

- The head is the largest and longest.
- The body is approximately half the head's height but the same width.
- The legs are slightly shorter than the head.

Other prominent body parts include the neck, which is half the head's width, and the eye, a central element to the ponies' design in placement, size, and shape. While many eyes differ in details, the placement and shape are normally unvarying. Throughout the later seasons of Friendship Is Magic, body types have varied, being designed to embody diverse characteristics, including age and personality.

== Subspecies ==
There are three major pony subspecies that make up the majority of Equestria's population, comprising roughly one-third each.

=== Earth ponies ===
Earth ponies possess an underlying connection to the earth, nature, and the environment that encourages the growth of plant life and a connection with wild animals. Earth pony-based technology is purely mechanical and often intended to replicate things they cannot do themselves. Earth ponies form the backbone of Equestria's economy, operating within most industrial sectors involving natural resources, construction, or extraction. Their natural talents in agriculture, forestry, and mining extend from plants to rock farms. Earth ponies exhibit increased strength, endurance, stamina, fortitude, and durability compared to pegasi and unicorns.

=== Pegasi ===
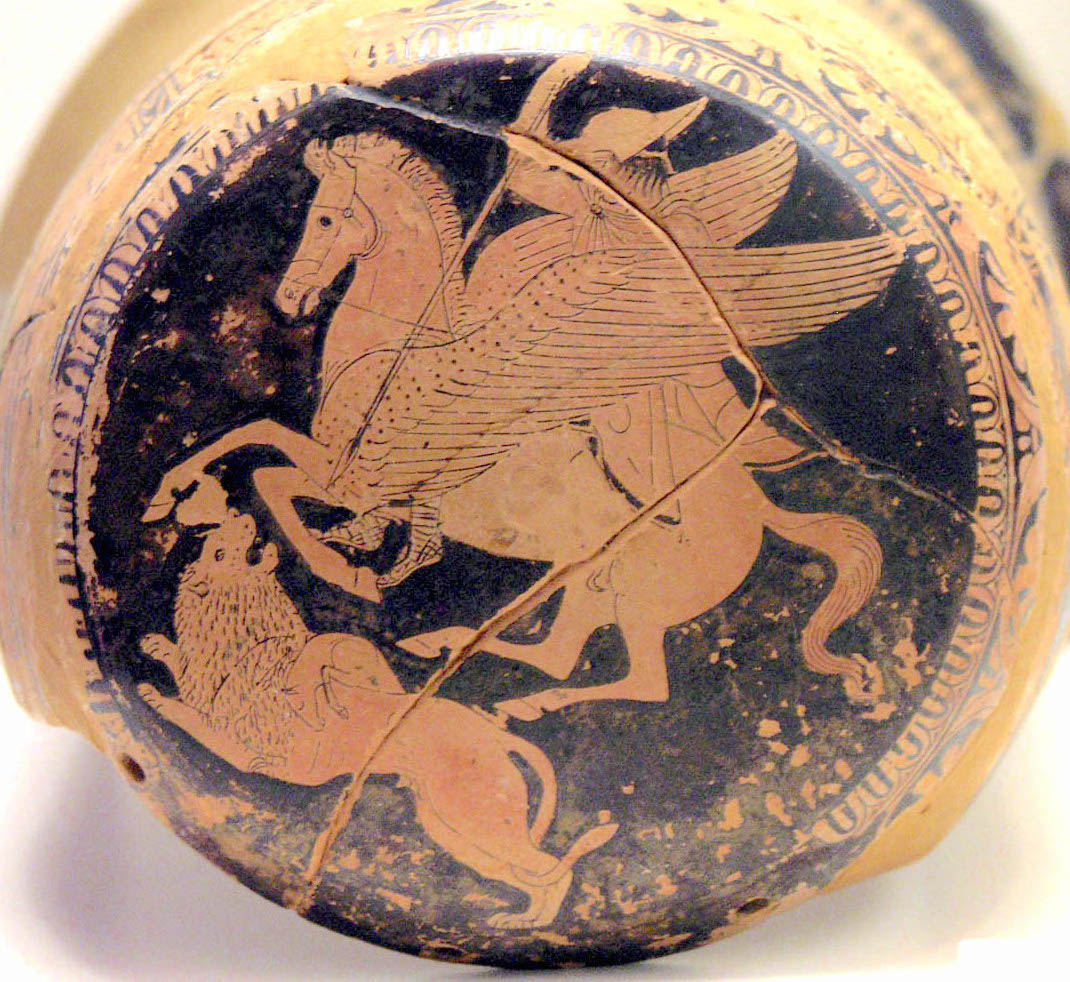
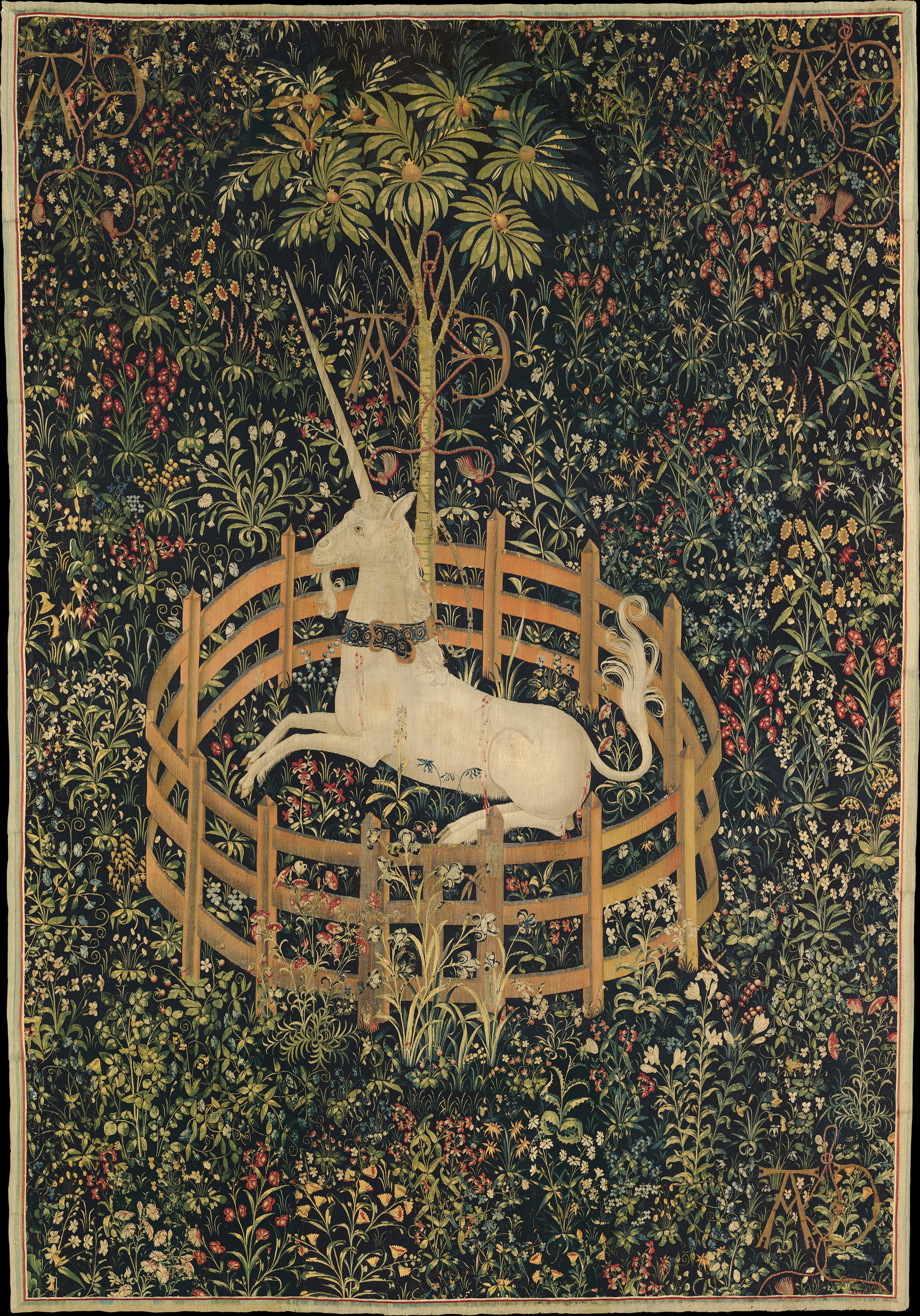
Faust stated that she borrowed from Greek and European mythology when designing creatures, like the pegasus and chimera pictured on this ancient Greek vase, or the Medieval unicorn.

Pegasi have the unique ability to fly and control the weather. This ability is powered by a pair of feathered wings, which is the distinguishing anatomical feature of pegasi compared to other pony races. Pegasi comprise the majority of ponies responsible for the postal service, patrolling Equestria's airspace, and controlling Equestria's weather. Pegasi are the only type of pony able to interact with clouds naturally as if they were tangible; this allows them to walk on and move clouds and, by extension, control the weather (although other pony types can do this through artificial means using magic). In the episode "Hurricane Fluttershy," a coordinated team of one hundred pegasi demonstrates their ability to generate a waterspout to funnel water from a lake.

A quality Faust borrowed from her childhood with the pegasi was a cold shower fountain that made her believe the pegasi lived in the clouds. She credited Paul Rudish for the inspiration of the pegasus ponies controlling the weather when he was drawing a pegasus pony running across clouds and creating rain.

=== Unicorns ===
Unicorns can directly absorb, wield, channel, and manipulate magic. Their magic is projected by a horn of variable length, texture, and color on their forehead. However, a unicorn's horn can be destroyed, severely inhibiting its magical capabilities. Unicorns are among the most educated and scholarly of Equestria's citizens. While other ponies' innate magical abilities manifest physically (such as an earth pony's strength or a pegasus' flight) and can be described as "intuitive or instinctive," unicorns require decades of training and study to master any spell beyond the most fundamental. Many spells and abilities are open to all unicorns, but many specialize in areas like teleportation, transfiguration, or medicine. Generally, unicorns have a collection of various spells relating to their specialty, with one being vastly more effective than the rest.

As Hasbro created a castle that Faust put up on her dresser, she believed unicorns would live in the mountains.

=== Alicorns ===
Alicorns have the distinguishing features of all three primary pony races—the horn of a unicorn, the wings of a pegasus, and the strength of an earth pony. They are typically taller and proportionally thinner than the average pony. Alicorns are either biologically immortal or age extremely slowly, as Celestia ruled Equestria for 1,000 years after banishing her sister to the moon. (Note: "Friendship is Magic - Part 1". My Little Pony: Friendship Is Magic. Season 1, Episode 1. October 10, 2010. Discovery Family.) (Note: "Friendship is Magic - Part 2". My Little Pony: Friendship Is Magic. Season 1, Episode 2. October 22, 2010. Discovery Family.) Alicorns are (typically) not a naturally occurring subspecies of pony, rather they are chosen by another alicorn to become one, usually after accomplishing a great deed. (Note: "Magical Mystery Cure". My Little Pony: Friendship Is Magic. Season 3. Episode 13. February 16, 2013. The Hub.) The sole exception to this rule is Flurry Heart, the daughter of Princess Cadance and Shining Armor, a unicorn who is the older brother of Twilight Sparkle. (Note: "The Crystalling - Part 1". My Little Pony: Friendship Is Magic. Season 6. Episode 1. March 26, 2016. Discovery Family.) The rulers of both Equestria (Princesses Celestia, Luna, and Twilight Sparkle) and the Crystal Empire (Princess Mi Amore Cadenza or "Cadance") are all alicorns.

=== Crystal ponies ===
Crystal ponies are the inhabitants of the Crystal Empire, a semi-autonomous region in Equestria. Their bodies sparkle and give the appearance of faceted edges and angles, in a similar way to crystals. (Note: "The Crystal Empire- Part 1". My Little Pony: Friendship Is Magic. Season 3, Episode 1. November 10, 2012. Discovery Family.)

=== Bat ponies ===
Bat ponies have slit-pupil eyes, night vision, and echolocation as well as bat-like wings that give them the ability to fly, similarly to pegasi. Unlike pegasi, they are unable to walk on clouds.

=== Vampire bat ponies ===
Vampire bat ponies have bat-like features while maintaining the physiology of a pony. These include bat-like wings, ears, fangs, and behavior, specifically of vampire fruit bats. Not much else is known, as there is only one appearance in the show across all seasons.

== Analysis ==
Academic scholars and critics have analyzed the depiction of pony races in My Little Pony as allegories for real-world social structures. Kevin Fletcher, writing in Orienting Feminism, analyzed the founding mythology presented in the episode "Hearth's Warming Eve," which depicts the three pony tribes overcoming division. Fletcher also wrote that alicorns, who possess traits of all three pony races, function as the upper-class elite within the show's social hierarchy. Andy Kryza of Fatherly wrote that the 2021 film My Little Pony: A New Generation depicts "blue-collar Earth ponies... rustic unicorns, and elitist pegasi" who have segregated themselves, with characters confronting "latent, learned prejudices" associated with each race, such as stereotypes of unicorns as "violent hicks", Earth ponies as "smelly and lazy", and pegasi as "power-hungry Zionists". Alesha Davis of The Post wrote that Friendship Is Magic positions ponies at "the apex of the social order" in relation to other species depicted in the show, such as dragons and buffalo.

== See also ==
- Ponysona
- Original character
