= Fimfiction =

My Little Pony fanfiction website

- Fimfiction logo
- Website type: My Little Pony fan fiction repository
- Website: fimfiction.net
- Registration: Optional; no longer available
- Launched: July 10, 2011; 15 years ago
- Current status: Active

Fimfiction, (Note: Officially capitalized as Fimfiction despite logo and site footer using FIMFiction.) known as Fimfic for short is a fan site for the collection, sharing, and discussion of fan fiction based on the animated television series My Little Pony: Friendship Is Magic. Launched on July 10, 2011, it is the largest hub for the My Little Pony fandom's literary community. By July 2015, Fimfiction had 185,014 registered users and 86,009 published stories.

Fimfiction features thousands of user groups that cover topics from proofreading to character discussions that serve as a "writing school". Academic studies have identified a system of "distributed mentoring" (in which writers receive feedback from various members across different channels) within the My Little Pony fan fiction community.

Unlike many fan fiction communities that tend to mostly be female, Fimfiction has a predominantly male audience.

In June 2025, facing significant abuse from spam accounts, user registration was disabled. As of October 2026, accounts can only be created by staff, with prospective users instructed to request account creation on the platform's official Discord server.

== See also ==
- Archive of Our Own
- Derpibooru
- FanFiction.Net
- LiveJournal
- Tumblr
- Wattpad
