= Criticism of the My Little Pony: Friendship Is Magic fandom =

Criticism of adult My Little Pony fans

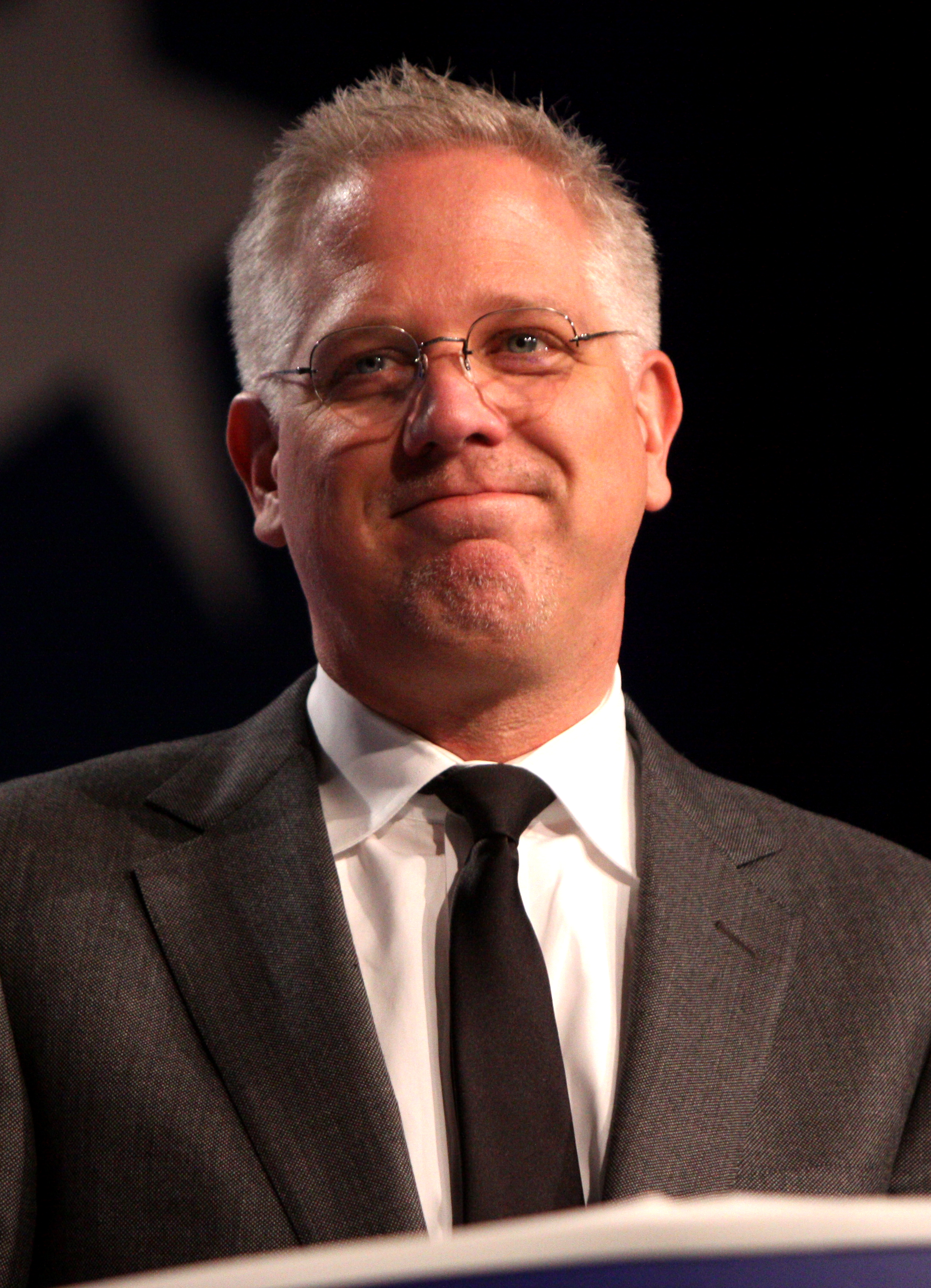
News commentator Glenn Beck defended bronies on his television show and his radio show after a 9-year-old boy was bullied for liking My Little Pony.

The My Little Pony: Friendship Is Magic fandom has faced various criticisms since its emergence in 2010. In the 2010s, much of the criticism centered on gender norms and the perception of adult males, commonly known as bronies, enjoying entertainment marketed toward young girls. Though some critics from conservative media outlets and Internet trolls have ridiculed the fandom, bronies have defended their enjoyment of the show as a challenge to traditional gender roles and as an avenue of positive escapism for fans.

== Background ==
The brony fandom refers to the fanbase of the animated television series My Little Pony: Friendship Is Magic, which emerged in late 2010 and early 2011 on the imageboard 4chan before spreading to other online communities. The fandom adopted the name brony, a portmanteau of bro and pony. Bronies have developed their own distinctive vernacular, organize numerous fan conventions, and engage in a culture of charitable activities. They commonly create personalized pony characters representing themselves called ponysonas (similar to furries and their fursonas), produce fan fiction, fan art, and original music inspired by the show. The brony fandom notably includes military personnel who have incorporated pony imagery into their units, and has attracted both media attention and academic study for challenging traditional gender norms around entertainment consumption.

== Gender norms ==
The adult fandom has been perceived negatively by some critics, with coverage of the brony fandom overshadowing the show itself. Much of the fandom's ridicule from others comes from the perception of the mostly adult male fanbase enjoying a show that is marketed to the young female demographic. Through this, the brony community has encountered ridicule through trolling on internet forums, not only from its inception at 4chan, but after moving away from the site. This has also been called out in conservative popular media. The Fox News Channel comedy talk program Red Eye poked fun at the fandom because it largely consists of young adult males. Commenting on Schlichter's article, Greg Pollowitz of National Review wrote that considering the target audience he could not understand the show's appeal to adult men. Jerry Springer attempted to bring bronies onto his long-running self-titled talk show for a segment on "Outrageously Guilty Pleasures", though fans warned others about the potential ridicule.

The gender-based criticism has also affected younger male fans of the show. One story that gained national attention was that of Grayson Bruce, a nine-year-old fan who was told to stop bringing a Rainbow Dash backpack to school to prevent bullying that he was receiving. An online campaign to show support for Bruce gained over 32,000 supporters on its Facebook page, and the brony fanbase, the show's creators and voice actors, and various public figures including Glenn Beck, Ronan Farrow and Eugene Volokh have stood up for the boy's actions. The school later revised its decision after speaking to the family and clarifying it was not trying to blame the child for the incident.

Rebecca Angel, writing for Wired's Geekmom column, described some of the negative feedback from fellow writers about the mostly male brony culture that included accusations of pedophilia and immaturity. Angel defended the fandom's culture, describing adult fans' interest as a form of escapism, and that the show provides characters they can relate to and talk about with other fans. She also acknowledged the double standard whereas females can watch male-oriented entertainment without question, while male bronies receive criticism about their interest in the show. Angel later described the brony fandom as rebellious towards gender roles, stating that "having interests that go against what men are supposed to embrace is the sneakiest kind of rebellion". In a similar vein, an "Idea Channel" segment on PBS said that the ridicule received by the brony community is partly because the male appreciation for the show challenges preconceived notions of gender roles in the mass media.

== Violence and pornography ==
Media outlets have criticized the adult-oriented fan creations based on the series, which frequently incorporates graphic violence and pornography. A notable example of this content is PONY.MOV, a web series animated by Max Gilardi in the style of John Kricfalusi that places the characters of the show in explicit and lewd situations. This content tends to appear in the results of Internet searches conducted by children looking for online copies of the television series or images of its characters, forcing their parents into premature discussions about mature themes. Sadie Gennis of TV Guide described this as "an unavoidable part of any online fandom".

== Male hegemony and female alienation ==
A study performed by graduate students from the University of Connecticut found that "a particularly extreme subset" of the brony fandom shows characteristics of hegemonic masculinity, where male members strive to keep their majority in the numbers by purposely excluding and alienating females. Sherilyn Connelly and others have noted that bronies alienate other fans of the franchise by focusing on the fandom itself rather than the franchise. She also said that bronies created an atmosphere of entitlement and anger when the franchise did not accommodate the fans' demands, resulting in a culture where death threats are made publicly and lightly.

== Racism and nationalism ==
Since the fandom's birth on 4chan in 2010, many media outlets have been critical of a vocal portion of the fandom that advocates racist and white nationalist ideologies. Vice reported on alt-right attempts to infiltrate brony and furry fandoms, where edgy and politically incorrect memes proliferated. In Rolling Stone, journalist Lauren Orsini acknowledged that extremist subsets of the fandom had existed since at least the mid-2010s.

Kaitlyn Tiffany, writing for The Atlantic described the popularity of fanart with racist or violent imagery and accounts who post extremist views on imageboards, particularly 4chan's "Politically Incorrect" (/pol/) and "My Little Pony" (/mlp/) boards. Mic reported that there was an increasing amount of anti-racist content during the George Floyd protests. In response, Derpibooru, the most popular brony fan art site, officially banned racist content in 2020.

In 2014, a fan-created pony character called "Aryanne" entered circulation, featuring a swastika cutie mark. In 2016, during Donald Trump's campaign for President, images of My Little Pony characters wearing Make America Great Again hats and Pit Viper sunglasses were commonly found on brony fan sites. The New Republic published an op-ed that decried the fandom's white nationalist aspects, saying "Yes, there is a connection between white identity politics and My Little Pony", saying that many on the alt-right supported the show because they viewed the fictional land Equestria as being an "example of nationalist politics."

Radical aspects of the fandom were scrutinized by the media after the Indianapolis FedEx shooting on April 15, 2021. The shooter, Brandon Scott Hole, frequently posted My Little Pony content to his Facebook page. Fans of the show quickly condemned Hole's actions and the racist views espoused by what they claimed was a small subset of the fandom.

== Sexual orientation ==
Some observers have speculated that the male segment of the fandom is predominantly gay, a notion that is rooted in the stereotype that gay men are inherently feminine. On /r/The_Donald, the revelation that an anti-Trump protestor identified as a brony led to a barrage of homophobic attacks, including, "His family should be ashamed of his degeneracy, so low can't even be called a faggot." However, a 2011 study by psychologists Pat Edwards and Marsha Howze Redden, dubbed The Brony Study, indicated that 84% of participating bronies identified as heterosexual.

== See also ==
- Analysis of the My Little Pony: Friendship Is Magic fandom
- Charity of the My Little Pony: Friendship Is Magic fandom
