= 15th Signal Brigade =

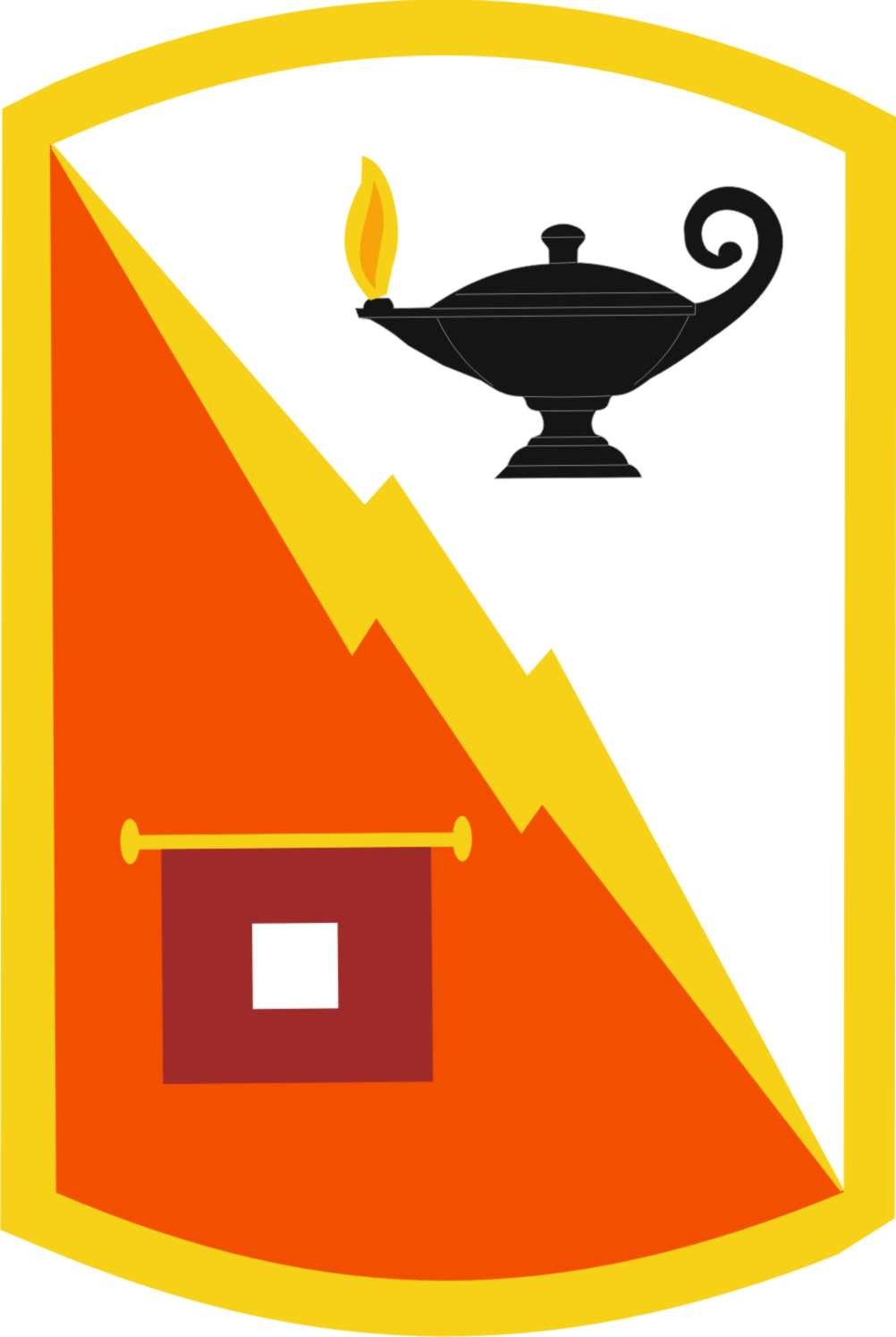
- Shoulder Sleeve Insignia
- Active: 1940
- Country: United States
- Branch: United States Army
- Type: Signal
- Role: Advanced Individual Training
- Size: Brigade
- Part of: Cyber Center of Excellence
- Garrison/HQ: Fort Gordon
- Nickname: TEAM 15
- Mottos: Fideliter Servimus; Faithfully We Serve; Faithful Service Voice Of Victory
- Colors: Orange and white are the colors traditionally associated with the Signal Corps.
- Website: Official website

Commanders
- Brigade Commander: COL Benjamin A. Schneller
- Command Sergeant Major: CSM Christopher E. Stadler

Insignia
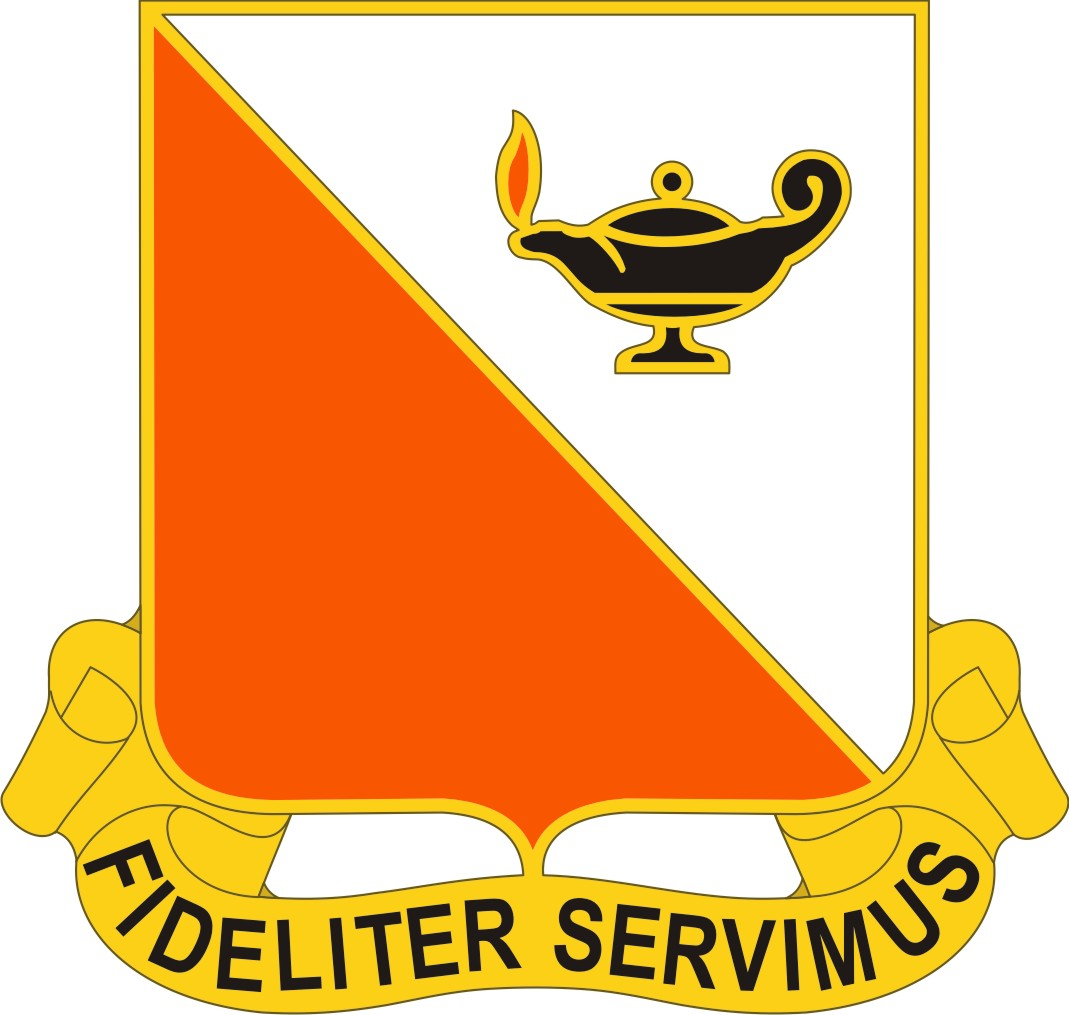
- Distinctive Unit Insignia
- Identification symbol: A gold color metal and enamel device that consists of a shield blazoned as follows: Per bend argent and tenné, in sinister chief a lamp of knowledge sable, flammant proper. Attached below the shield a gold scroll inscribed FIDELITER SERVIMUS in black letters.
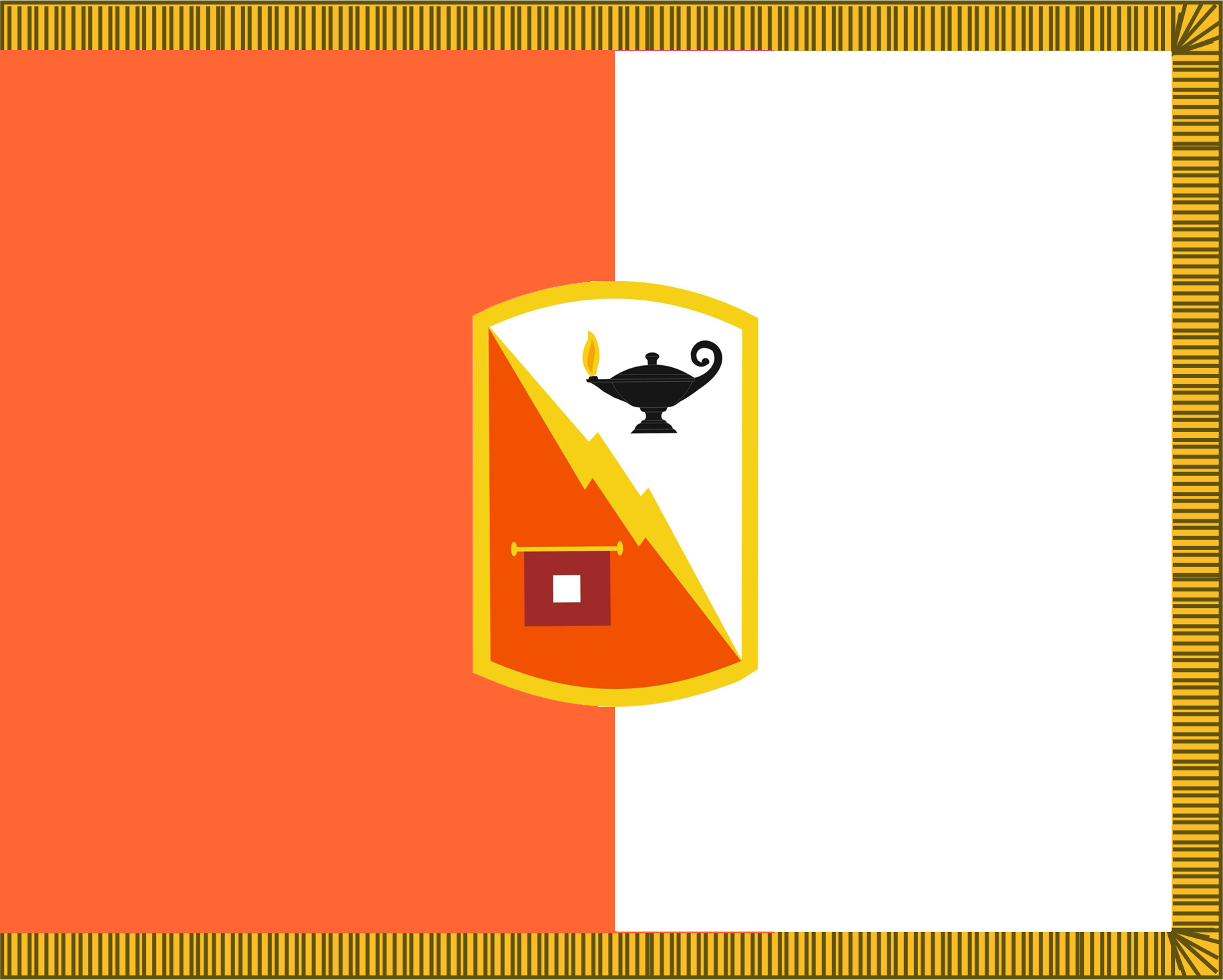
- 15th Signal Brigade Flag

The 15th Signal Brigade (TEAM 15) is an active duty unit of the United States Army, based at Fort Gordon. The 15th Signal Brigade trains and develops professional Signal and Cyber Soldiers and Leaders and supports the execution of academic Professional Military Education, Initial Entry Training, and Functional Training in order to develop adaptive Cyberspace operators committed to the Profession of Arms, who embrace the Warrior Ethos, and live the Army values; capable of effectively supporting and defending the cyber domain.

== Subordinate Units ==
Units in the 15th Signal Brigade include:

- 369th Signal Battalion
- 442nd Signal Battalion
- 551st Signal Battalion
- 401st Cyber Battalion
- Ordnance Training Detachment - Eisenhower

== History ==
LINEAGE (active) Constituted 30 November 1940 in the Army of the United States as the 15th Signal Service Battalion. Activated 1 December 1940 at Fort Monmouth, New Jersey. Redesignated 15 September 1941 as the 15th Signal Service Regiment. Redesignated 14 December 1942 as the 15th Signal Training Regiment. Disbanded 31 May 1945 at Fort Monmouth, New Jersey. Headquarters and Headquarters Company, 15th Signal Training Regiment, reconstituted 23 September 1986 in the Regular Army as Headquarters and Headquarters Detachment, 15th Signal Brigade, transferred to the United States Army Training and Doctrine Command, and activated at Fort Gordon, Georgia.
