= The Wonderbolts =

Fictional aerial performance team from My Little Pony

- The Wonderbolts as they appear in "Sonic Rainboom"
- Type: Elite aerial aerobatics team
- Headquarters: Cloudsdale
- Members: Pegasi
- Captain: Spitfire; Rainbow Dash (finale)
- Affiliations: Equestrian Royal Guard

The Wonderbolts are a fictional elite aerial aerobatics team that appears in the fourth incarnation of Hasbro's My Little Pony toyline and media franchise, beginning with My Little Pony: Friendship Is Magic (2010–2019).

As the most prestigious flying team in Equestria, the Wonderbolts are composed of pegasi with exceptional aerial skills and athleticism. Headquartered in the cloud city of Cloudsdale, they perform at major events throughout Equestria. In addition, they are shown serving military and rescue functions when needed. Joining the Wonderbolts is the ultimate dream for aspiring pegasus athletes, most notably Rainbow Dash, who eventually achieves her goal of becoming a member in the sixth season episode "Newbie Dash".

== Appearances ==
=== Fourth My Little Pony incarnation (2010–2021) ===
==== My Little Pony: Friendship Is Magic ====
The Wonderbolts first appear in the series premiere during the Summer Sun Celebration, where they are seen performing aerial stunts for the crowd in Cloudsdale. Throughout the first season, Rainbow Dash idolizes the Wonderbolts and makes it her lifelong goal to join them. In "Sonic Rainboom", Rainbow Dash first gains their attention by performing a Sonic Rainboom, rescuing three Wonderbolts and her friend Rarity.

Rainbow Dash is eventually accepted into the Wonderbolts Academy in season three, becomes a member of the Wonderbolts Reserves in season four, and achieves full membership in season six. By the series finale, Rainbow Dash is shown to have become the captain of the Wonderbolts.

==== My Little Pony: The Movie ====
The Wonderbolts appear briefly in the film during the Storm King's invasion of Canterlot, where they attempt to defend the city alongside other Equestrian forces before being overwhelmed by the enemy's superior numbers and magic.

== Members ==
- Spitfire (voiced by Nicole Oliver in the episode "Sonic Rainboom" and Kelly Metzger in all other appearances), a "spirited competitor" and "no-nonsense instructor" at the Wonderbolts' training academy.
- Soarin' (voiced by Matt Hill) is Spitfire's second-in-command.
- Rainbow Dash (voiced by Ashleigh Ball) a main character who has the goal of joining the Wonderbolts at the beginning of the series. She joins the Wonderbolts as a trainee in "Wonderbolts Academy", becomes a reservist in "Testing Testing 1, 2, 3", and then a full-time member in "Newbie Dash".
- Fleetfoot (voiced by Andrea Libman)
- Thunderlane (voiced by Trevor Devall)
- Blaze (voiced by Tabitha St. Germain)
- Misty Fly (voiced by Kelly Sheridan)
- High Winds (voiced by Michelle Creber)
- Surprise (voiced by Claire Corlett)
- Wind Rider (voiced by Jan Rabson), a retired Wonderbolt who frames Rainbow Dash in "Rarity Investigates!" in order to protect his flight speed record.

== Development ==
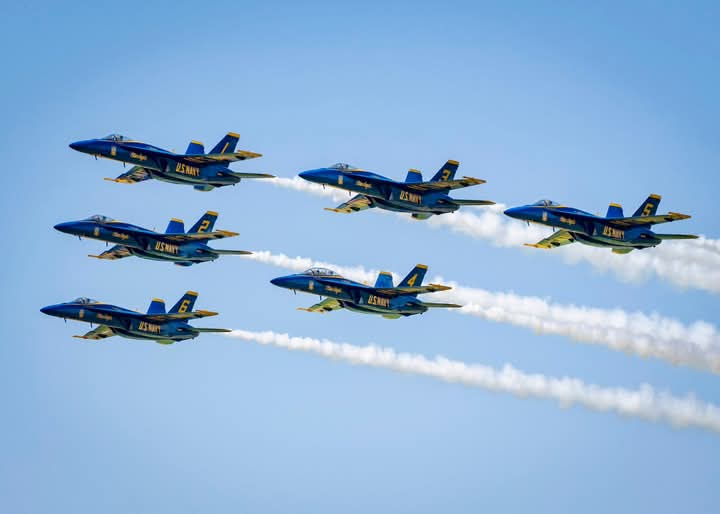
Delta "6 Plane Formation" of The Blue Angels, the inspiration for the Wonderbolts

According to show creator Lauren Faust, the Wonderbolts were designed by her husband Craig McCracken, the creator of The Powerpuff Girls. The Wonderbolts were inspired by the Blue Angels; they both share the same blue and gold color scheme and past Wonderbolts uniforms resemble historic Air Force uniforms. According to writer Amy Keating Rogers, the name of the Wonderbolts' founder, General Firefly, is a tribute to Faust's online username "fyre-flye", in turn named after the "G1" toy Firefly.

== Reception and analysis ==
In her 2016 study on military bronies (military service members who are fans of My Little Pony, also known as bronies), Maria Patrice Amon described the Wonderbolts as an Equestrian version of real-world military flight demonstration units like the Blue Angels. Amon described the Wonderbolts' uniforms, which borrow military uniform motifs in their design, as "a rare tool of unification" in a world where each pony is highly individualized through their cutie marks and color combinations. Amon also wrote that some military bronies use their official military uniforms as part of their Wonderbolts cosplay, which she described as a form of unintentional "masculine innocence."

== See also ==
- Rainbow Dash
- My Little Pony: Friendship Is Magic fandom
- List of My Little Pony: Friendship Is Magic characters
- Military bronies
