= Analysis of the My Little Pony: Friendship Is Magic fandom =

Academic examination of the brony fandom

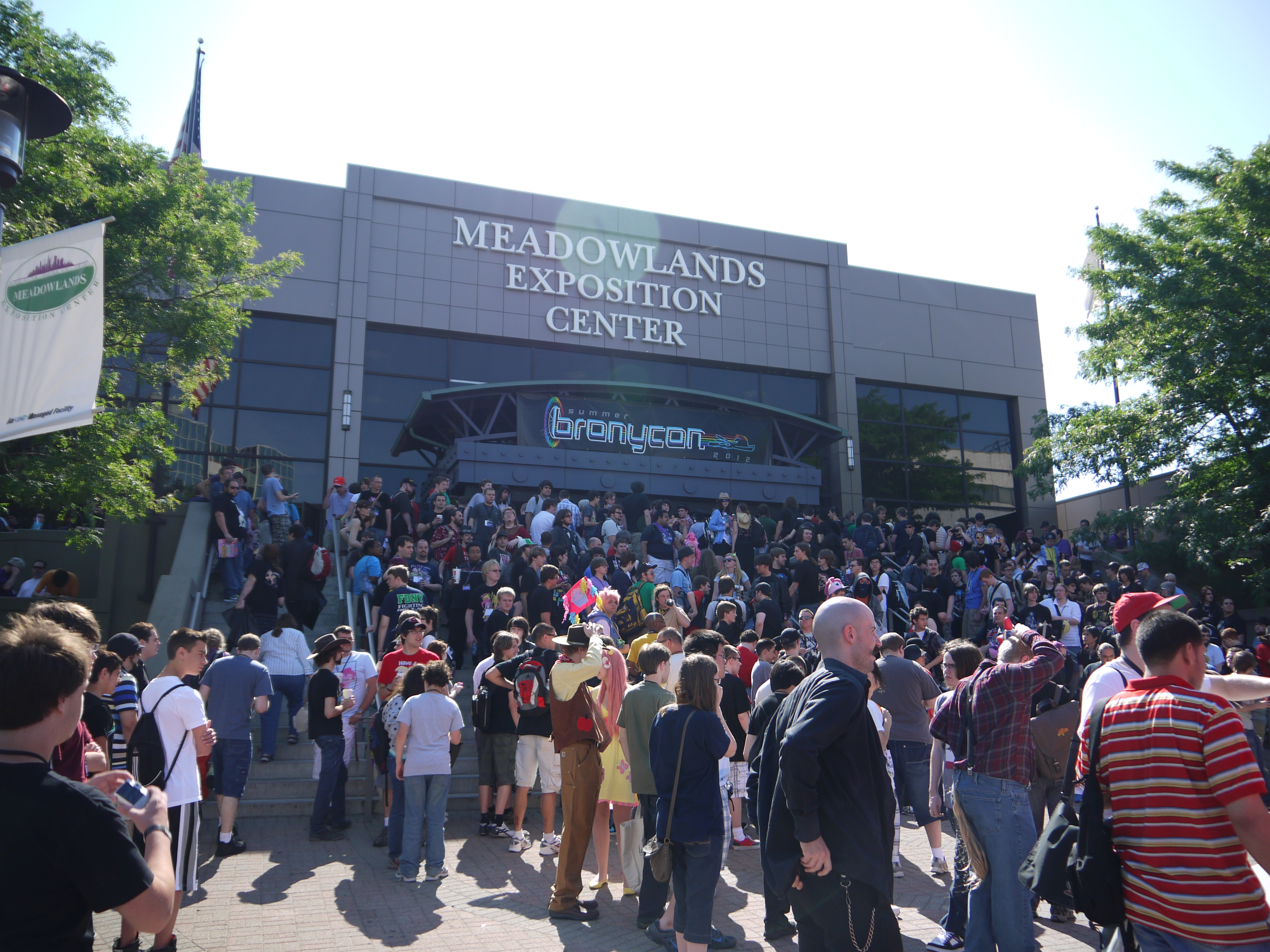
Bronies waiting at the start of the 2012 Summer BronyCon convention

The brony fandom—the adult fandom of the animated television series My Little Pony: Friendship Is Magic—has been the subject of extensive peer-reviewed academic analysis and scholarly examination since its emergence in 2010. Researchers across various disciplines, such as media studies, psychology, gender studies, sociology, theology, and digital culture, have studied the fandom's unique characteristics, community dynamics, and cultural impact. The brony fandom has attracted particular academic interest due to its challenge to traditional gender norms through adult male participation in media marketed toward young girls, its distinctive online community structures and community vernacular, and its prolific creative output spanning music, fan art, and fan fiction.

The brony fandom has been recognized as major case studies in digital participatory culture and hegemonic masculinity. Academic analyses have examined both the community's positive contributions to online culture and its more problematic elements, including the creation of adult-oriented content known as clop, instances of exclusionary behavior toward female fans, and extremist ideologies.

== Demographics ==
Across all of our studies, the average age of bronies has ranged from about 21 to 26 years. More importantly, these results reveal an upward trend in bronies' age over time. What’s likely happening is that fans of the show are aging with the show and sticking with the community as time goes on, rather than dropping out and being replaced with new fans—something we typically see in other fan communities [...]

For contrast, work done on the furry fandom consistently finds that the average age of furries has remained fairly stable over the last decade, suggesting that older fans are leaving the fandom at about the same rate that younger fans are entering the fandom. In the case of bronies, while new fans do continue to join the community, the story seems to primarily be one of fans who get on-board and stick with the show over time, rather than being replaced every few years by new fans.

— Patrick Edwards, Meet the Bronies (2019)

In 2012, two informal surveys involving 2,300 and 9,000 participants, respectively, revealed that the average age of adult fans was around 21, approximately 86% were male, and 63% were currently pursuing a college degree or higher qualification. The surveys estimated that there were between 7 and 12.4 million people in the United States who would identify themselves as bronies in January 2012. As of 2018, 53% of bronies were younger than 20 years old.

During the same period, a more detailed study called the Brony Study was conducted by Dr. Patrick Edwards, a psychology professor at Wofford College. Edwards had initially compiled one of the aforementioned informal surveys and presented the results at ongoing brony conventions, noting that the brony fandom provided "the opportunity to study a fan phenomenon from its inception" and planned to continue the survey to watch the evolution of the subculture. The 2012 edition of the Brony Study (with 1,300 respondents) found that 86% of bronies were male with an average age of 21; 84% identified as heterosexual, 10.3% as bisexual, 1.7% as homosexual, 3.8% as asexual; 62% were college students or graduates, and 35.2% were in high school; 70% were students, and 32.7% were employed; 69% were from North America, 22% from Europe, and 5% from Oceania; 96.4% were single and 2.9% were married. A subsequent 2013 survey with over 21,000 respondents reported that the majority of fans were in the 15–30 age range with an average age between 19 and 20, and over 65% were heterosexual. The survey revealed that approximately 27% of respondents fell into the "INTJ" classification of the Myers–Briggs Type Indicator, which normally only occurs in 1–3% of the population according to the surveyors. That same year, Hub Network's CEO and President Margaret Loesch, who was the executive producer of the 1980s and 1990s animated My Little Pony television shows, noted that there were male fans of those past shows, but there are considerably more for Friendship Is Magic due to the quality of the show and the influence of social media and the Internet.

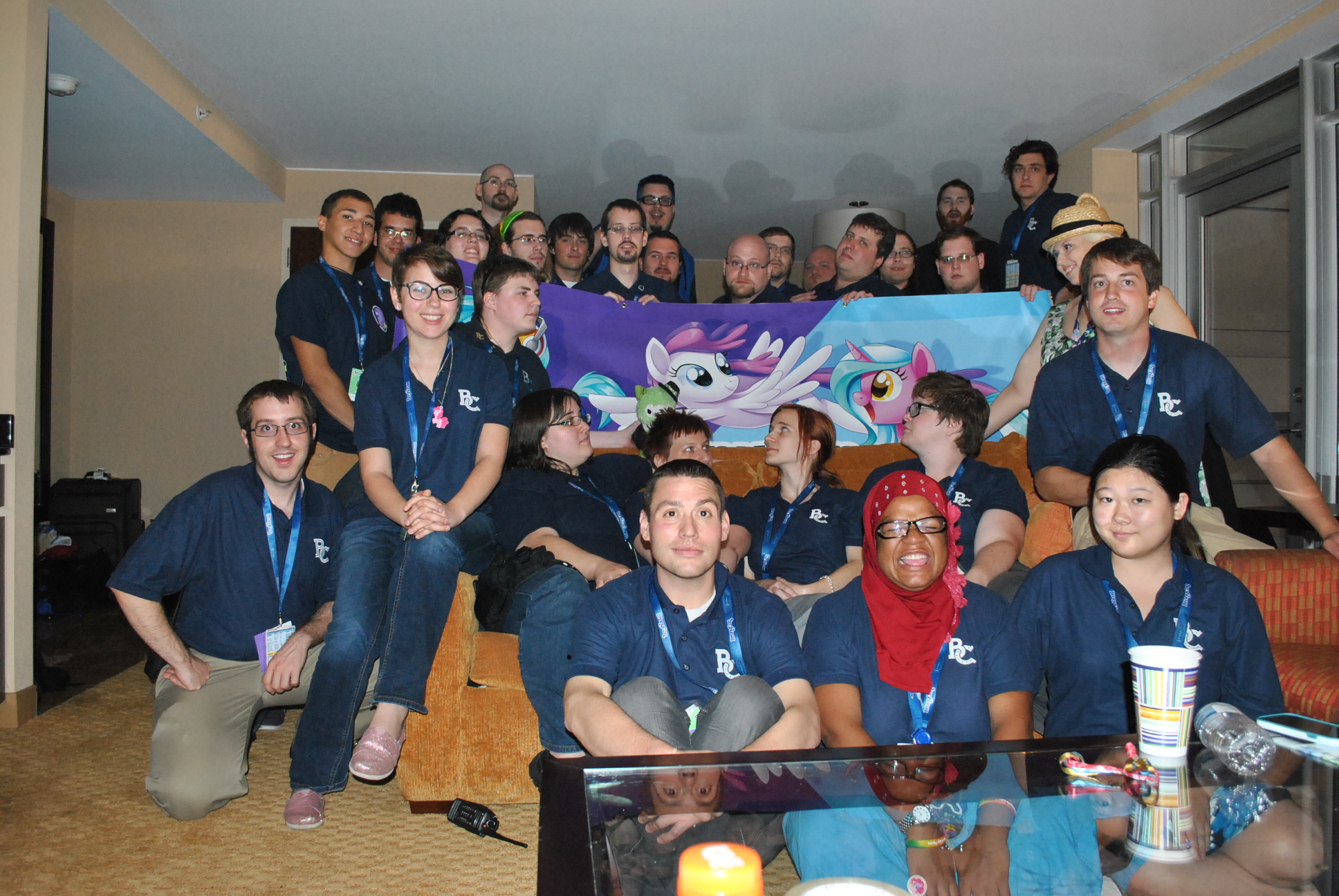
Bronies at BronyCon 2014

In September 2019, Edwards published the book Meet the Bronies, which summarized the results of the Brony Studies from 2012 to 2018. Across 19 surveys involving over 50,000 participants, bronies were found to be predominantly young adult males with an average age of 21 in 2012 and 26 in 2018, showing an upward trend over time as fans aged with the show. While 86% of participants identified as male in early studies, later research indicated that the fandom became more diverse, with 5.4% identifying as transgender and 3.6% as non-binary or genderqueer by 2016. The studies consistently found that around 70% of bronies identified as heterosexual, 10% as bisexual, 2% as homosexual, and 9% as asexual, making them approximately twice as likely to identify as LGBT compared to the general population of similar age. Female bronies were significantly more likely to identify as non-heterosexual than their male counterparts; 79.5% of male fans identified as heterosexual compared to only 47.9% of female fans. The majority of participants (62–63%) were pursuing college degrees or higher education, with 30–70% currently attending college and 40–60% enrolled as full-time students; 15–30% were working full-time, 20–25% part-time, and 18–20% were unemployed. Bronies were primarily from English-speaking countries and predominantly resided in larger cities with populations over 500,000. The studies also found that 94% were unmarried, though relationship patterns improved over time, with early studies showing many single participants but later surveys indicating the majority were in non-married dating relationships by 2016. Most bronies reported joining the fandom around the second and third seasons of the show; by 2016, bronies had an average of 3.7 years in the fandom.

== Identification with the term brony ==
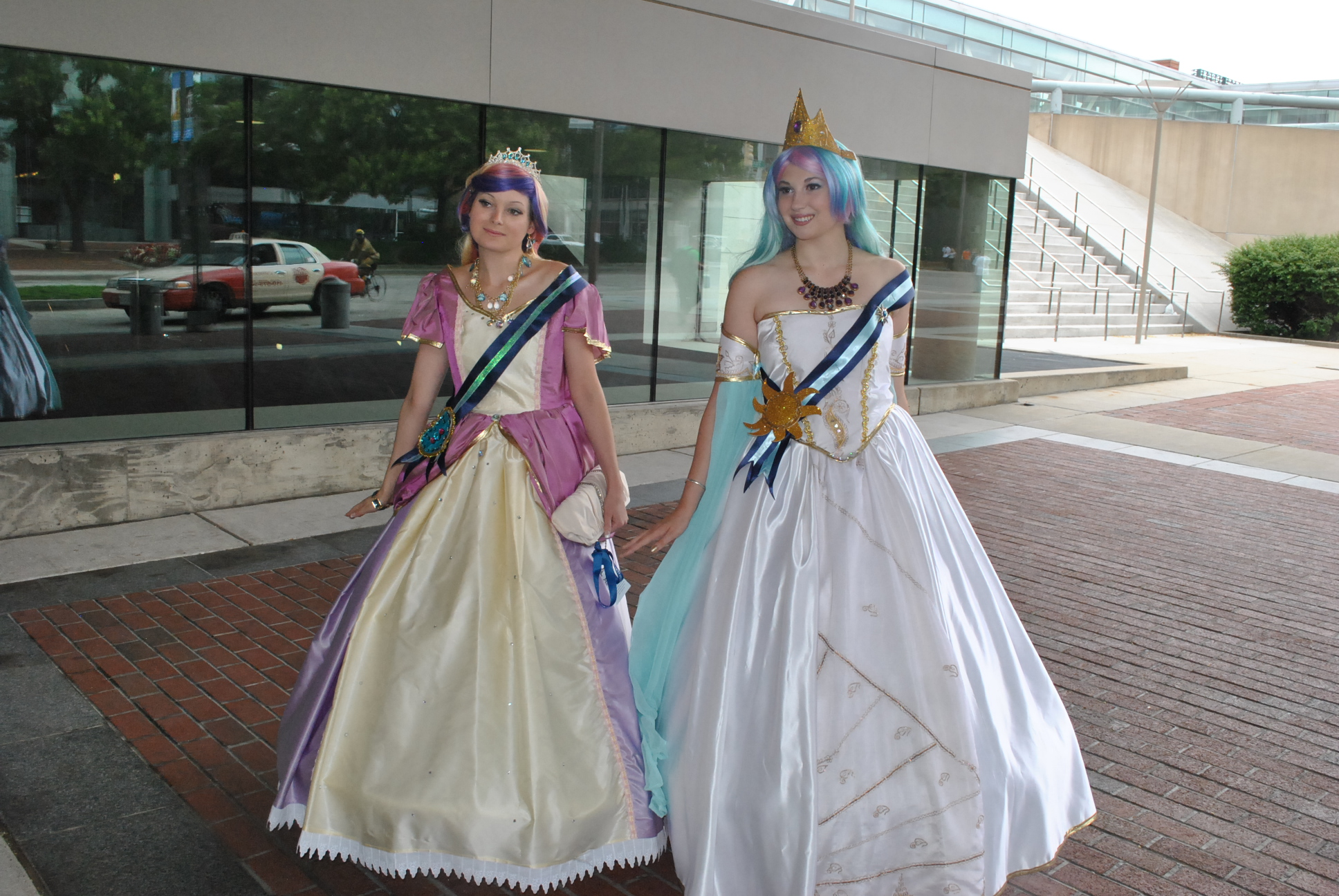
The term pegasister was created early in the fandom's history to describe female fans of the show; subsequent studies have consistently found that the majority of female fans dislike the label pegasister and prefer to identify as a brony.

The term brony, a portmanteau of bro and pony, emerged in 2010 from 4chan as a reflection of the predominantly adult male fanbase of the show and became widely used as a gender-neutral identifier despite its masculine linguistic origins. The alternative term pegasister was created specifically for female fans, but the majority of female fans of the show dislike the term and prefer to identify as a brony over pegasister. In 2016, 93.4% of fans of Friendship Is Magic identified as a brony; 95% of male fans and 79.3% of female fans used the label to describe themselves. In a 2021 study published in the Journal of Gender Studies, female fans described the term pegasister as "isolating" and viewed brony as more inclusive, with one stating: "I hate when people call me a pegasister, 'cause I don't like to separate myself by gender."

A 2017 ethnographic study of /mlp/ (the My Little Pony board of 4chan) found that some adult male fans of the show who use /mlp/ explicitly rejected the brony label in favor of more transgressive, self-deprecating, and tongue-in-cheek labels like ponyfag and horsefucker. These fans viewed bronies as fans who publicly displayed their interest in the show, while they preferred to maintain anonymity and secrecy about their fandom participation.

== Discrimination and anti-fandom ("anti-bronies") ==
In a 2021 analysis of brony discussions on Reddit, sociologist Steven Dashiell found that bronies experience stigma and discrimination due to graphic stereotypes portraying them as "disgusting weirdos who are sexually attracted to animals from a children's television show" or "some combination of gay, socially incompetent and perverted." Dashiell wrote that mainstream media has actively stigmatized the community, such as a 2011 Adult Swim ad that included bronies in their "all-time list of creepy weird things that scare [them]." Dashiell found that the potential for ridicule and discrimination leads many bronies to hide their identity in public spaces, only feeling comfortable expressing their fandom in designated safe spaces like brony conventions and online communities. The study also found that bronies are frequently mischaracterized as having sexual interests in the show's content and are often incorrectly grouped with furries.

The association with the brony identity has been documented as an additional source of online harassment. On /r/The_Donald, the identification of an anti-Trump protestor as a brony led to further stigmatization and attacks, with one poster writing: "His family should be ashamed of his degeneracy, so low can't even be called a faggot." Bronies have received ridicule in other places, including Fox News and 4chan, with attacks on their gender, mental health, sexuality, and maturity being frequent. In a 2015 article published in the Journal of Popular Television, Bethan Jones wrote that while most anti-fan discourse at the time revolved around the merit of the work (e.g. the Twilight series and Fifty Shades of Grey), the brony fandom was unique in that their anti-fandom ("anti-bronies") revolved around the fans and not the show itself.

A 2016 study surveyed 118 fantasy sport fans using a feeling thermometer test to quantify their attitudes toward furries, bronies, and anime fans on a scale from 1 (extremely negative) to 100 (extremely positive), with 50 representing neutral feelings. Fantasy sport fans rated themselves significantly above neutral but rated bronies, furries, and anime fans significantly below neutral, with bronies and furries receiving equally negative ratings that were lower than those given to anime fans. A subsequent 2018 study of over 3,500 participants from various fandoms found evidence of a psychological phenomenon called "denial of personal discrimination." When asked whether their fandom as a group faces discrimination and whether they personally have experienced discrimination, bronies consistently gave different answers. Fans acknowledged that their fandom faces discrimination but reported experiencing less discrimination themselves individually, a pattern that occurred across bronies, furries, anime fans, and general interest fan groups.

== Psychology ==
The 2013 edition of the Brony Study found that bronies' initial reactions to Friendship Is Magic fell into two categories, with negative reactions being stronger than positive reactions, as represented by responses ranging from "I thought the idea that I might like MLP was strange and creepy" to "I thought it was cool and something I could be passionate about." The study identified two main behavioral patterns: a Social Factor (characterized by high engagement and visibility) and an Isolation Factor (marked by secrecy and withdrawal from the community). This led to a four-type classification: Social Bronies (37.5% of subjects) who were openly engaged with the community; Secret Bronies (12.6%) who were engaged but hidden from family and friends; Hidden Bronies (39.6%) who were both disengaged and secretive; and Independent Bronies (10.2%) who were open about their identity but not community-focused. The study found no systematic mental issues and difficulties, and identified personality traits like absorption, extraversion, and conscientiousness as key predictors of whether individuals fell on the social or isolation spectrum.

== Participatory culture ==
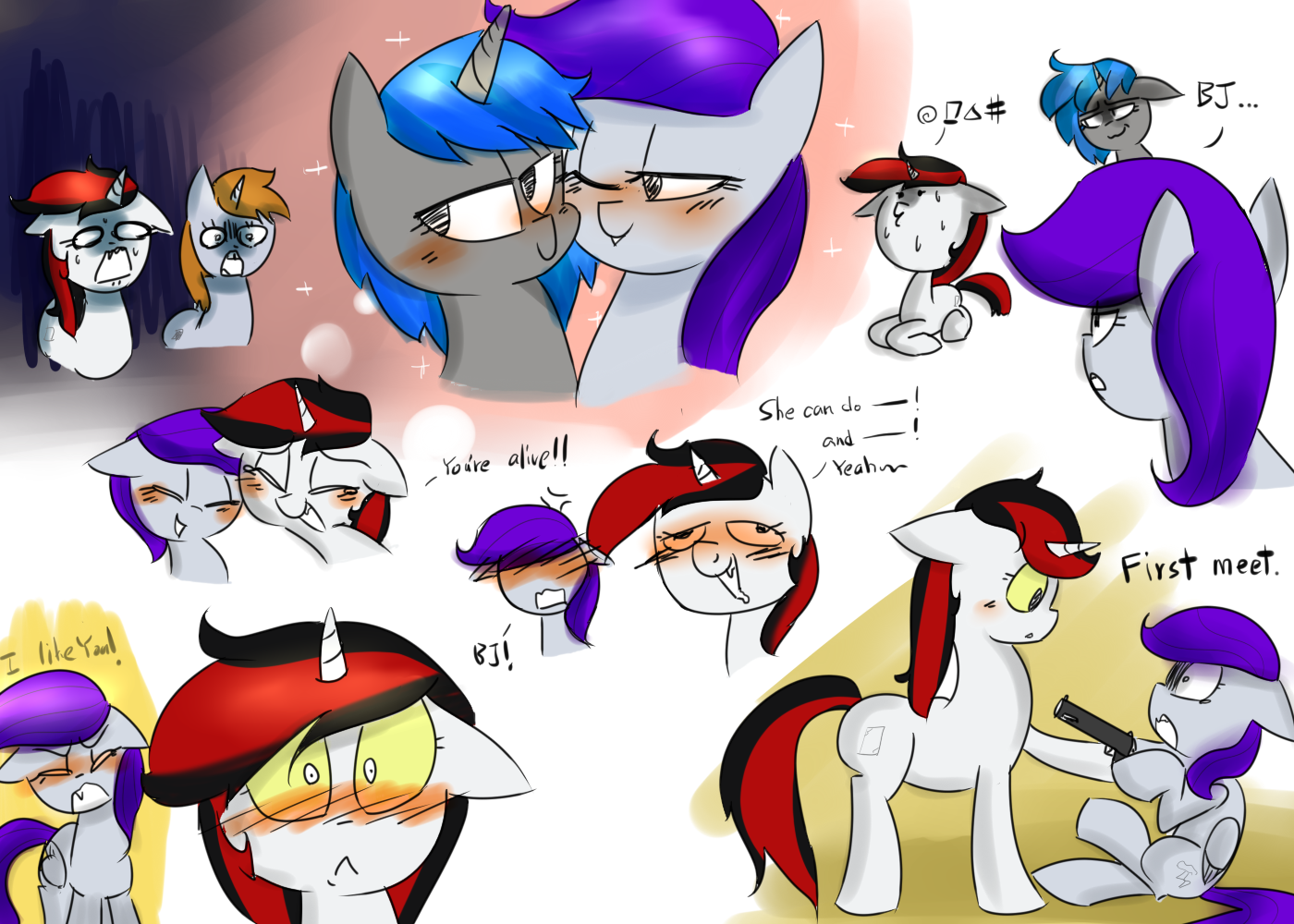
Fallout: Equestria, one of the most influential and acclaimed works of the My Little Pony: Friendship Is Magic fan fiction community, has inspired a large amount of fan art.

Academics have characterized the brony fandom as a participatory culture, where fans actively engage with the source material by creating their own content rather than simply consuming it. The fandom produces a large quantity of Internet memes, fan art, fan fiction, fan music, and fan animations. Some fan works, like the 2D fighting game Fighting Is Magic (which would later become Them's Fightin' Herds) and the album Love & Ponystep have achieved professional quality and recognition.

The brony fandom's strong participatory culture is credited for creating the character of Derpy Hooves, a background pony with crossed eyes from the first episode.

== Hegemonic masculinity ==
The brony fandom has been studied as a major case study in hegemonic masculinity and its subversion.

=== Military personnel ===
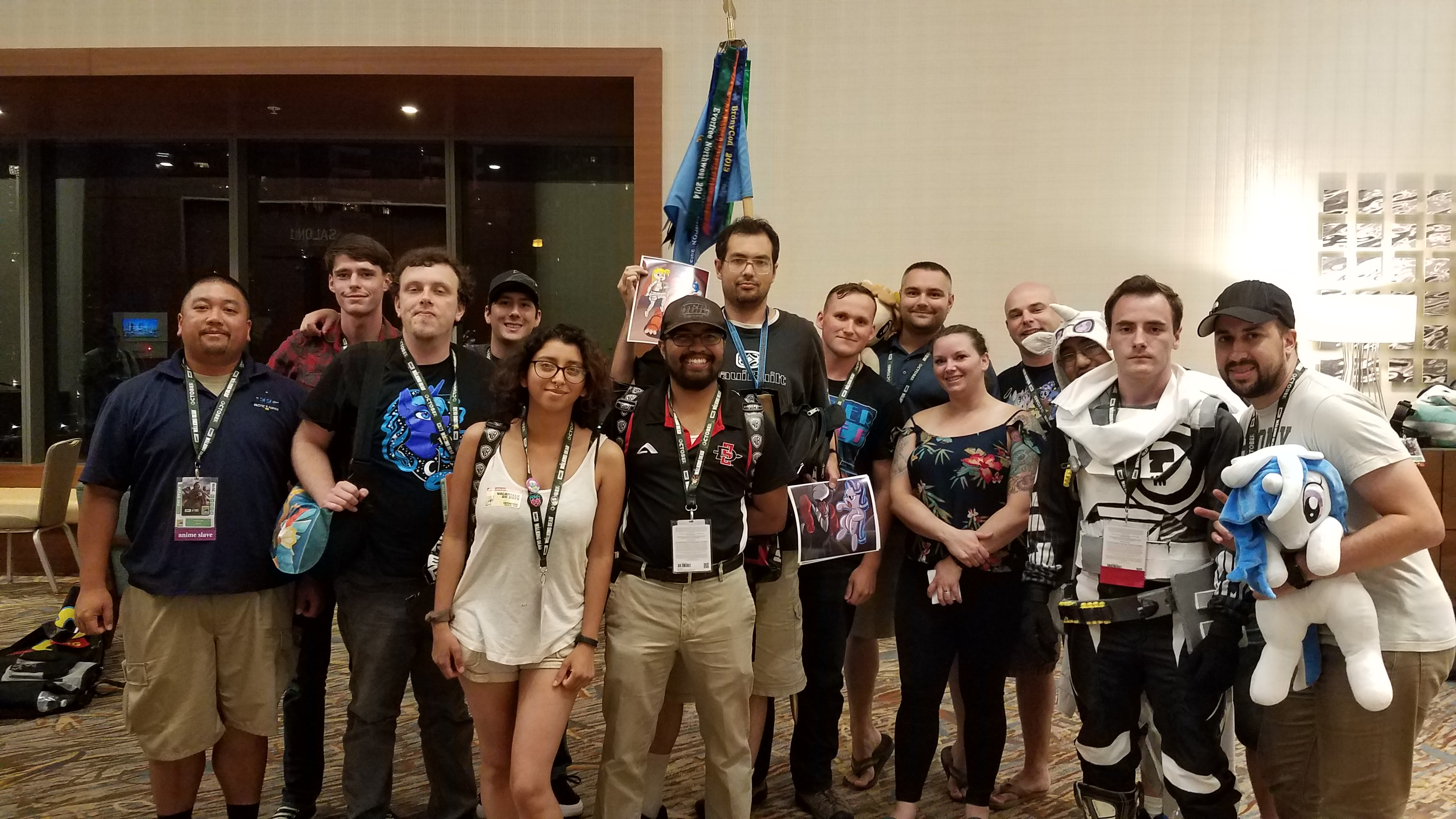
Military veteran, and non-veteran, fans of My Little Pony: Friendship is Magic, posing for a group photo after the panel "Bronies in Uniform" at San Diego Comic-Con 2018

The brony fandom notably has a subculture of enlisted military personnel; studies have estimated that military bronies comprise 4–5% of the overall brony population. In the Journal of Fandom Studies, Maria Patrice Amon argued that military bronies challenge traditional ideas about masculinity because their military service gives them secure masculine credentials, which allows them to openly enjoy a show designed for young girls without losing their masculine identity. According to Amon, by expressing emotions and sensitivity—traits traditionally associated with women—while maintaining their roles as soldiers, military bronies expand what it means to be masculine in military culture. Anna Reglińska-Jemioł of Czas Kultury emphasized that military bronies do not completely reject existing masculine norms but rather seek to expand understanding of masculinity by questioning some expectations of traditionally male behaviors. She argued that military bronies aim to create space for activities that can be associated with masculinity while allowing themselves to experience non-masculine innocence through conversations about friendship, emotions, and sharing feelings. Sociologist Kevin W. Martin wrote in Pacific Standard that the military bronies phenomenon is "a fascinating site of negotiations of masculinity in one of its strongest bastions." He also observed that "male military bronies at times suffer from the kind of stigma and bullying reserved for feminine men and, because they are also often assumed to be gay, homophobia."

== Parasociality ==
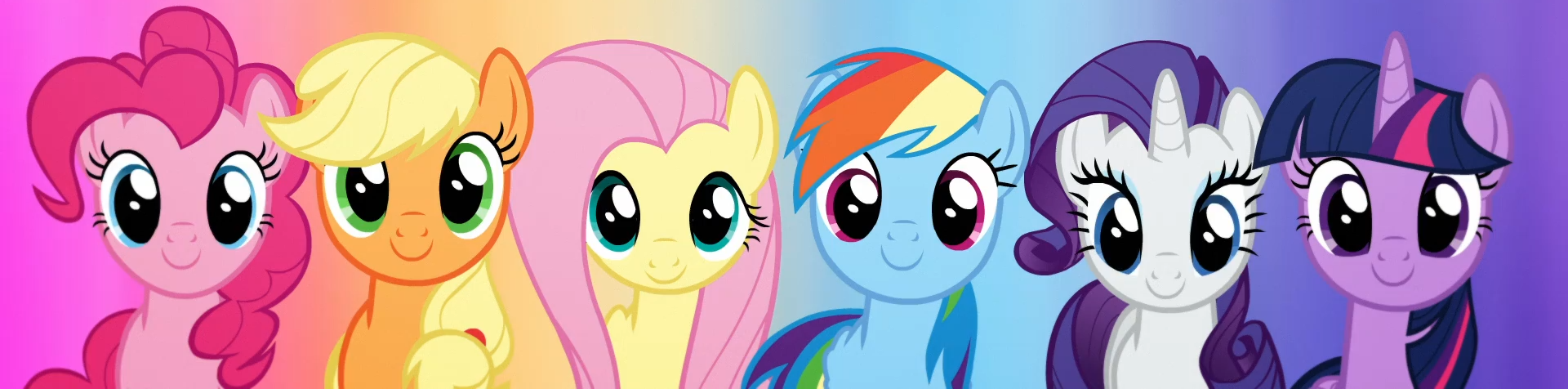
Percentage of bronies who chose each Mane Six character as their favorite, according to surveys of tens of thousands of bronies from 2012 to 2018

In 2015, Anne Gilbert wrote in Transformative Works and Cultures that bronies form strong emotional connections with the Mane Six (the six main characters of Friendship Is Magic), often identifying with specific characters and appreciating their detailed personalities and growth arcs. Gilbert observed that bronies praise the characters' complexity and development, with fans expressing sentiments like "I've practically fallen in love with Twilight... she's socially awkward as well and to see her grow and make friends, it makes me happy." However, Gilbert observed that rather than embracing the characters' originally intended feminist messaging, some bronies tended to appropriate the Mane Six by emphasizing their similarities to traditionally masculine geek culture references, effectively incorporating their appreciation for these female characters into conventional gender performances rather than allowing the characters to challenge existing notions of masculinity.

In Meet the Bronies, Edwards examined preferences of the Mane Six and their psychological and parasocial relationships with bronies. They found that fans of different characters often mirrored their chosen character's canonical personality traits, with characters serving as aspirational role models or sources of emotional support. Edwards's study showed correlations between character preference and traits like creativity, social anxiety, community engagement, and psychological well-being.

A 2022 study in the Psychology of Popular Media examining the psychological and parasocial relationships between bronies and the Mane Six described the brony fandom as an exemplary case study for parasocial relationships due to its long-running nature, robust community interactions, and clearly defined personalities of the Mane Six. The researchers surveyed 829 bronies to determine whether identification with specific characters correlated with participants exhibiting the personality traits those characters canonically embody. The study used established psychological scales to measure six traits: humor (Pinkie Pie), generosity (Rarity), loyalty (Rainbow Dash), honesty (Applejack), kindness (Fluttershy), and friendship (Twilight Sparkle), alongside the Inclusion of Other in the Self scale to assess character identification. The study found that most of the Mane Six demonstrated strong correlations between fans' preferred character identification and corresponding personality traits, with Applejack's canonical trait of honesty showing the weakest correlation.

== Religion, spirituality and irreligion ==
Academics have documented the relationship between religious faith and the brony fandom. According to Edwards, bronies attend church less frequently than their parents and rate themselves below average on religiosity scales, possibly because mainstream religions often promote traditional gender norms that conflict with male fans enjoying a show marketed to girls. Edwards suggested that less religious bronies may be drawn to the fandom because it provides the sense of meaning and community that religious institutions typically offer, though he also remarked that bronies' lower religiosity levels are typical for their generations (millennials and Generation Z).

In his 2015 article in the Journal of Religion and Popular Culture, religious history professor Andrew Crome examined how bronies reacted to the season 1 episode "Feeling Pinkie Keen" that many saw as promoting religious belief over scientific thinking. The episode showed Twilight Sparkle struggling to understand Pinkie Pie's seemingly supernatural abilities, which led to angry fan reactions from those who felt the episode was "promoting belief in the supernatural" and being "anti-atheist." Crome found that fans saw themselves as either protecting child viewers from what they considered a dangerous message about accepting supernatural claims without evidence, or reinterpreting the episode as actually criticizing poor scientific practice rather than promoting religion.

Crome's 2014 research on Christian My Little Pony fan works found that rather than seeing fandom and faith as conflicting, many Christian bronies actively combined both. By studying their fan fiction and artwork, Crome documented how Christian bronies used familiar character traits to explain religious ideas, as the show's ostensible lack of religion provided "a space for fans to freely project religious concepts." In 2019, Crome interviewed twelve Christian bronies and remarked that the brony fandom served as a way for them to better experience religion. Interviewees reported organizing My Little Pony-themed church services, Bible studies, and using fan works to spread Christianity within the general brony fandom. Crome found that Christian bronies saw their fandom as a way God worked in their lives; they considered fan works to be forms of worship and their fandom to be a divine mission to spread Christianity within it.

In their 2024 essay The Bible and My Little Pony, Religious Studies professor Tom de Bruin extended Crome's research on Christian My Little Pony fan fiction. De Bruin analyzed two primary methods bronies use to combine Christianity and My Little Pony: introducing ponies into biblical narratives, and introducing Christianity into Equestria. De Bruin found that while Christian bronies are respectful about religion and try to stick to correct religious beliefs, creating these works changes how they read the Bible, with readers reporting that biblical passages now remind them of My Little Pony characters. De Bruin borrowed Henry Jenkins's terminology to describe this fan activity as poaching: Christian bronies often read Christian meanings into the show even when the creators did not intend them, and develop personal fan theories that characters are Christians based on details like rainbow symbolism and phrases spoken by the characters like "my prayers have been answered." According to de Bruin, "[Christian My Little Pony fan fiction writers] are not simply using MLP fandom as a tool for theological reflection or religious experience, but also recasting the entire fandom into the worldview of their faith." He concluded that "their theology needs to be dogmatically correct, otherwise their engagement with the fandom will be for naught."

In a 2016 essay on the spirituality of the brony fandom, Pavol Kosnáč separated casual fans from what he called "devotees": bronies whose entire lifestyle and beliefs are shaped by the show. Through interviews with 32 bronies and surveys with 99 others, he found that 63% said the show and its fandom had changed their worldview or moral values, and 12.5% called it the most important thing in their lives. When asked what effects the show had on them, bronies reported a lasting sense of happiness that some said helped with depression, moral guidance from the show's lessons, and feeling safe in what they saw as a harsh world. Kosnáč found that for some Christian bronies, the show strengthened their existing faith. Like Edwards, Kosnáč concluded that the most devoted bronies treat the fandom like a religion because it provides psychological and social support like what organized religions typically offer.

== New sincerity ==
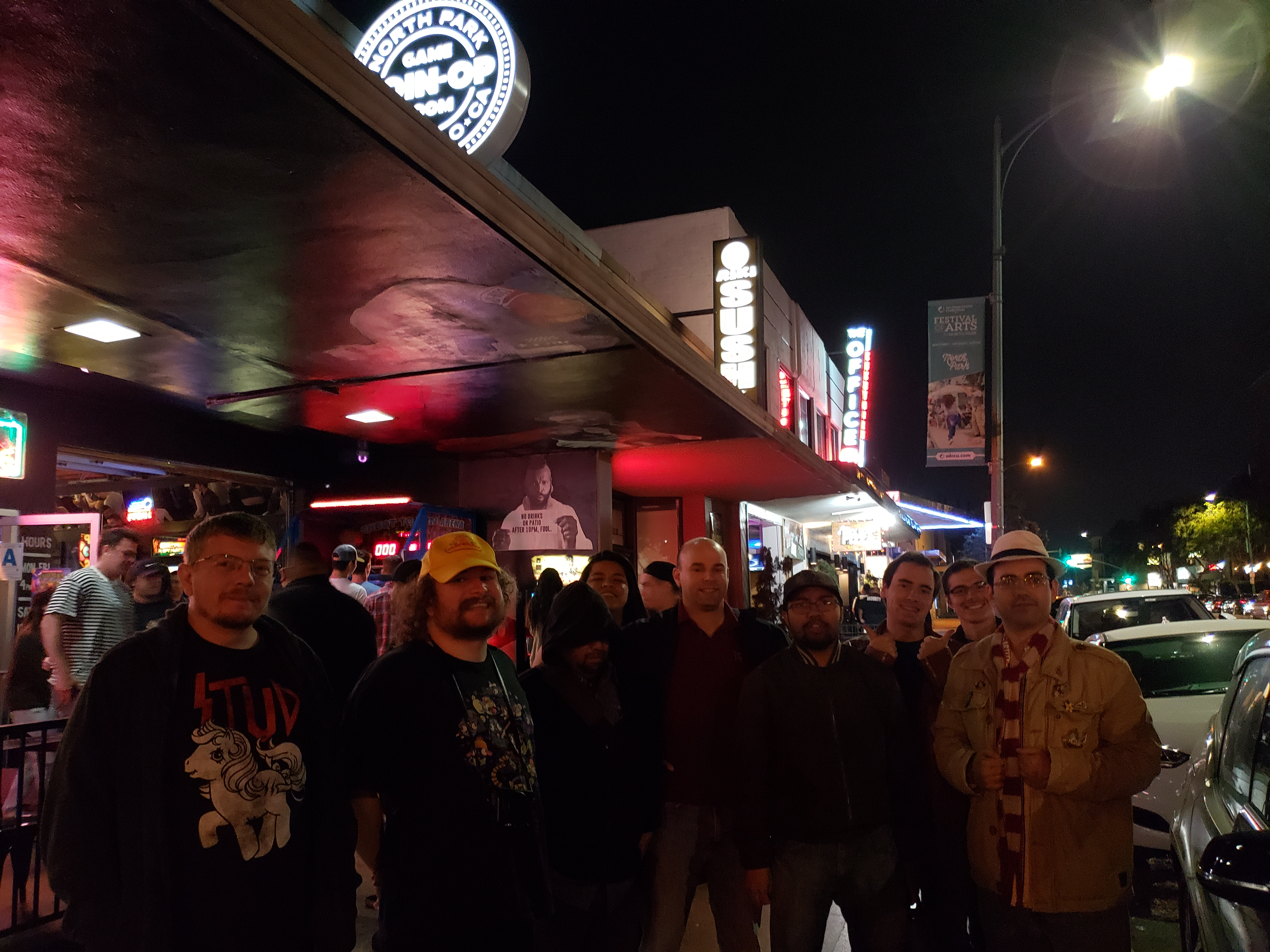
Bronies at a pub crawl in 2018

Though the initial growth of the fandom came from 4chan participants enjoying the ironic nature of grown men enjoying a show for girls, the fandom continued to grow based on sincere appreciation of the work. Robert Thompson, a professor of media studies at Syracuse University, stated that "It's one thing for guys to like motorcycles and muscle cars and soccer. For a guy to like My Little Pony, it's so out there that it becomes almost avant garde. It has a hip quality to it." According to Angela Watercutter of Wired, the fandom is an example of internet neo-sincerity, where these older viewers watch the show "un-ironically" and "without guilt" breaking gender stereotypes, furthermore creating new material around it. Prof. Roberta Pearson of the University of Nottingham in film and television studies stated that "This is a level of fan devotion I've not seen before", while Prof. Charles Soukup of the University of Northern Colorado in communication studies suggested that this effort is an indication of the "ultra-cult era" that bronies exhibit, where "media consumers discover extremely unexpected and obscure media texts to cultivate uniqueness and distinctiveness for their mediated identities". Jessica Klein, writing for Salon, noted that the fandom was an especially welcoming space for female fans in comparison to other male-dominated fandoms.

== Overlap with the furry fandom ==
The question of whether My Little Pony fans should be lumped in with furries has been hotly contested by furries and bronies alike. On the one hand, the show itself seems to fall into the category of "furry media," given that it is a show about anthropomorphized horses—and, indeed, for some furries, this was a draw to the show. On the other hand, some bronies distinguish their interest from furry, arguing that liking a specific instance of furry media does not, in and of itself, make them a furry and, by extension, arguing that not every show with anthropomorphized characters should be considered a "furry show." As another example, the television show Bojack Horseman prominently features anthropomorphic animal characters (including the show’s titular character, Bojack), but most of its fans would neither consider the show a "furry show" nor consider themselves to be furries, despite the fact that furries may watch the show and construe it as a piece of furry media. Furry, it would seem, is in the eye of the beholder.

— Stephen Reysen and Courtney "Nuka" Plante, Furscience: A Decade of Psychological Research on the Furry Fandom (2023)

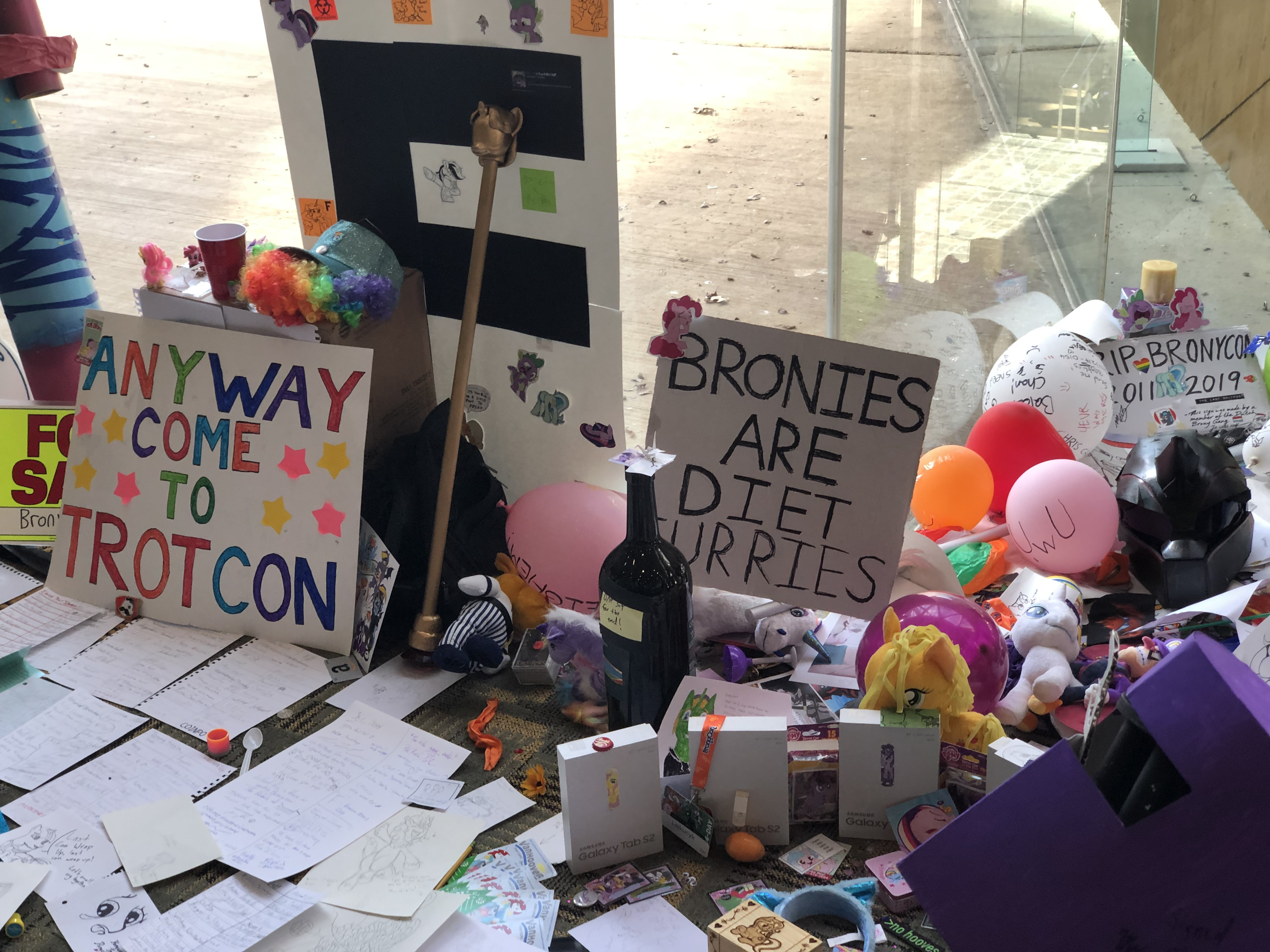
A sign at BronyCon 2019 that reads "bronies are diet furries", a reference to the similarities between the brony and furry fandoms

The brony fandom is distinct from the furry fandom. (Note: In particular, the following studies make explicit distinctions between bronies and furries: What We Talk about When We Talk about Bronies (2015); Not all Fantasies are Created Equal: Fantasy Sport Fans' Perceptions of Furry, Brony, and Anime Fans (2016); Meet the Bronies: The Psychology of the Adult My Little Pony Fandom (2019); Transported to Another World: The Psychology of Anime Fans (2021); Furscience: A Decade of Psychological Research on the Furry Fandom (2023)) However, research has documented overlap between the two fandoms.

Longitudinal studies of the furry fandom found that in 2012, approximately 25% of furries identified as bronies; the show's popularity impacted furry fandom content creation, with many furry artists producing My Little Pony fan art during the show's early years. The percentage of furries who were also bronies gradually declined to 15% by 2019 and stabilized at around 10% as of 2023. Contrary to perceptions of bronies as outsiders "invading" the furry fandom, studies found that furries who identify as bronies have on average been involved in the furry fandom longer than non-brony furries. Compared to non-brony furries, brony furries reported smaller friendship networks, but demonstrated greater involvement in furry fandom activities, including higher attendance at in-person events and stronger feelings of community belonging. Brony furries tend to be more obsessive over the furry fandom than non-brony furries and were more likely to openly disclose their involvement in the furry fandom. Brony furries scored lower on perspective-taking but reported greater feelings of solidarity with animals, stronger spiritual connections to their fursona species, and were more likely to endorse New Age beliefs and identify as spiritual. In general, furry bronies did not experience stigmatization within the brony fandom for their participation in the furry fandom.

== See also ==
- Criticism of the My Little Pony: Friendship Is Magic fandom
- Music of the My Little Pony: Friendship Is Magic fandom
- Art of the My Little Pony: Friendship Is Magic fandom
- Slang of the My Little Pony: Friendship Is Magic fandom
- My Little Pony fan convention
- My Little Pony: Friendship Is Magic fan fiction
