= 369th Signal Battalion (United States) =

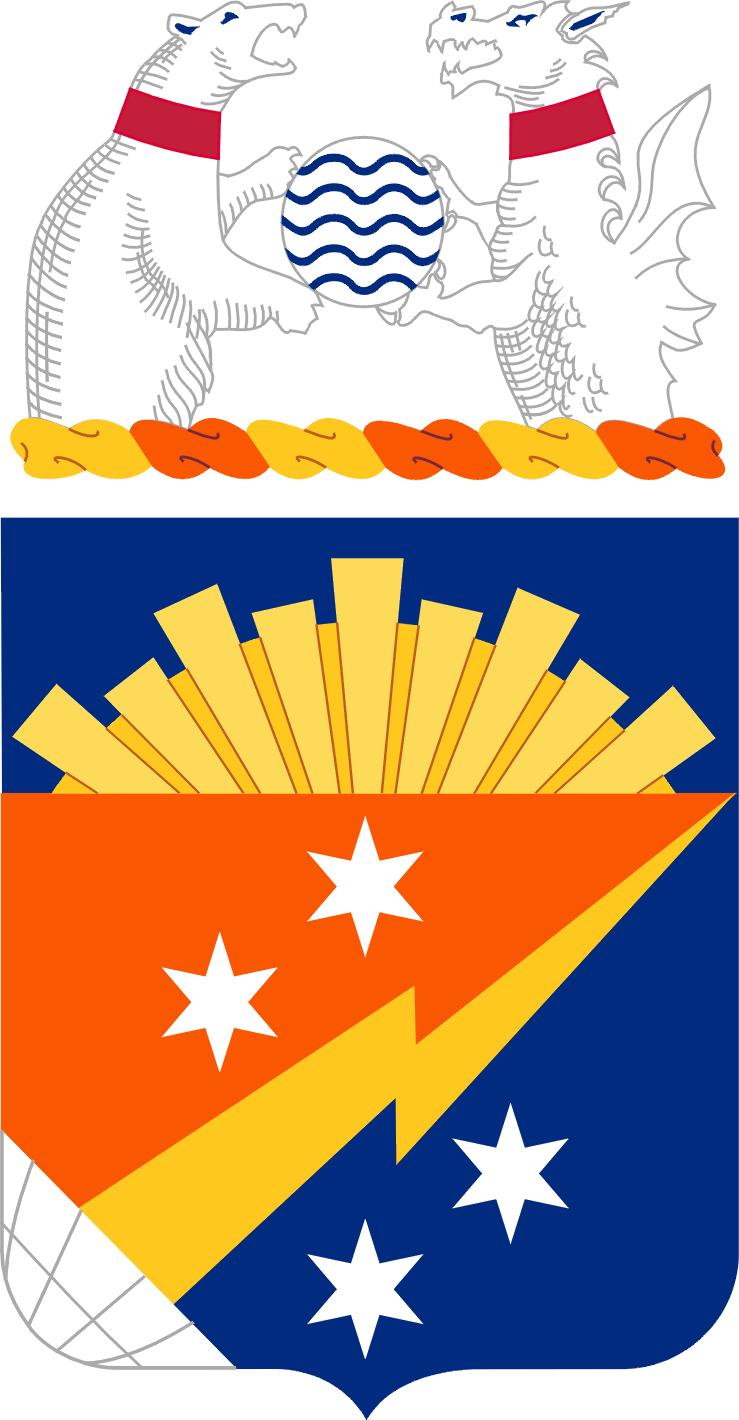
- 369th Signal Battalion Coat of Arms
- Active: 1944 – Present
- Country: United States of America
- Branch: United States Army
- Type: Signal
- Part of: 15th Signal Brigade
- Garrison/HQ: Fort Gordon
- Nickname: Warriors
- Motto: Quality All Ways
- Website: http://www.signal.army.mil/index.php/15th-battalions/369th-signal-battalion

Commanders
- Current commander: LTC Demetrius Howard
- Command Sergeant Major: CSM Brian Davis

Insignia
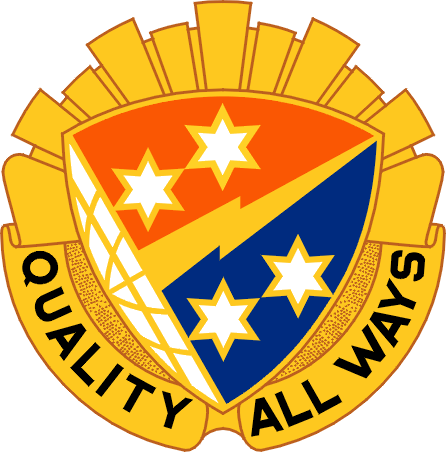
- Distinctive Unit Insignia

The 369th Signal Battalion is a United States Army Signal Battalion. It is organized under the 15th Regimental Signal Brigade at Fort Gordon, Georgia. As a US Army Training and Doctrine Command unit, it serves as one of two battalions which provide Advanced Individual Training (AIT) to United States Army Signal Corps recruits.

== Mission ==
The 369th Signal Battalion prepares soldiers to make an immediate impact to the Operational Army at their first unit of assignment living by the Soldier’s Creed, the Army Values, and understanding the importance of teamwork.

== Lineage ==
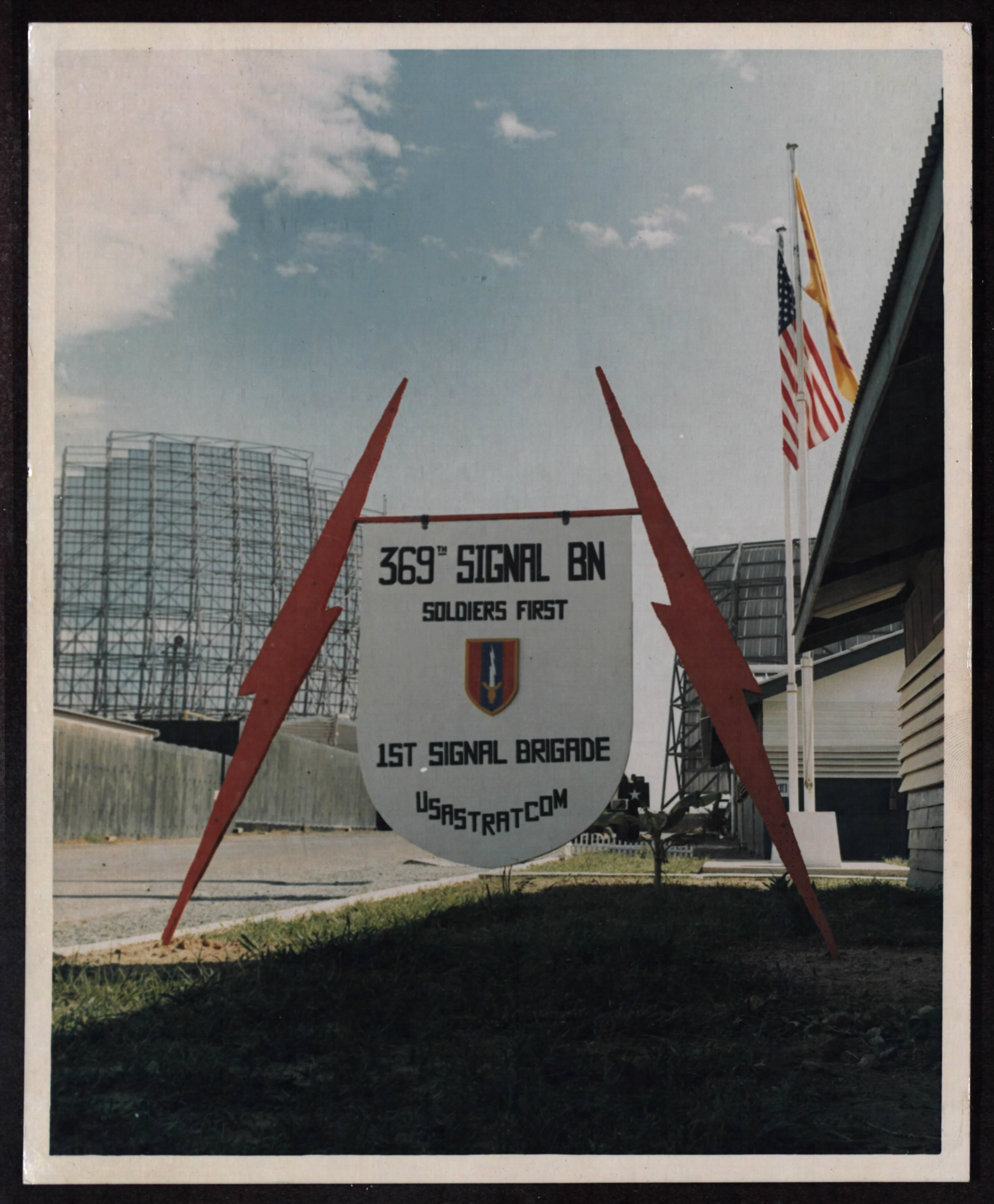
Headquarters of the 369th Signal Battalion, Phu Lam, Vietnam, 1969

Constituted 10 October 1944 in the Army of the United States as Headquarters and Headquarters Detachment, 3369th Signal Service Battalion

Activated 9 November 1944 in Alaska

Inactivated 11 March 1947 in Alaska

Redesignated 15 June 1969 as Headquarters and Headquarters Company, 369th Signal Battalion, allotted to the Regular Army, and activated in Vietnam

Inactivated 30 June 1971 in Vietnam

Headquarters transferred 23 September 1986 to the United States Army Training and Doctrine Command and activated at Fort Gordon, Georgia.

== Honors ==
=== Campaign participation credit ===
- World War II: Asiatic-Pacific Theater, Streamer without inscription
- Vietnam: Summer-Fall 1969; Winter-Spring 1970; Sanctuary Counteroffensive; Counteroffensive, Phase VII

=== Decorations ===
- Meritorious Unit Commendation (Army) for ASIATIC-PACIFIC THEATER
- Meritorious Unit Commendation (Army) for VIETNAM 1968–1970
- Company A additionally entitled to:
  - Army Superior Unit Award for 1999–2000

== Organization & Current Mission ==
The current mission of the 369th Signal Battalion is to "Transform Soldiers into technically and tactically competent Warriors who live by the Soldier’s Creed, understand the importance of teamwork and are prepared, confident, and disciplined to take their place in the ranks of the Army."

The unit's current function is to train the following Signal Corps Military Occupational Specialties:

- Headquarters & A Company (Alpha Lions)
  - Permanent Party
- B Company (Bravo Black Sheep)
  - 25U Signal Support Systems Specialist
- C Company (Crimson Knights)
  - 25S Satellite Communication Systems Operator-Maintainer
- D Company (Delta Dawgs)
  - 25U Signal Support Systems Specialist
- E Company (deactivated 2016)(Echo Wolfpack)
  - TBD
- F Company (Foxtrot)
  - Hold Company
