= 551st Signal Battalion (United States) =

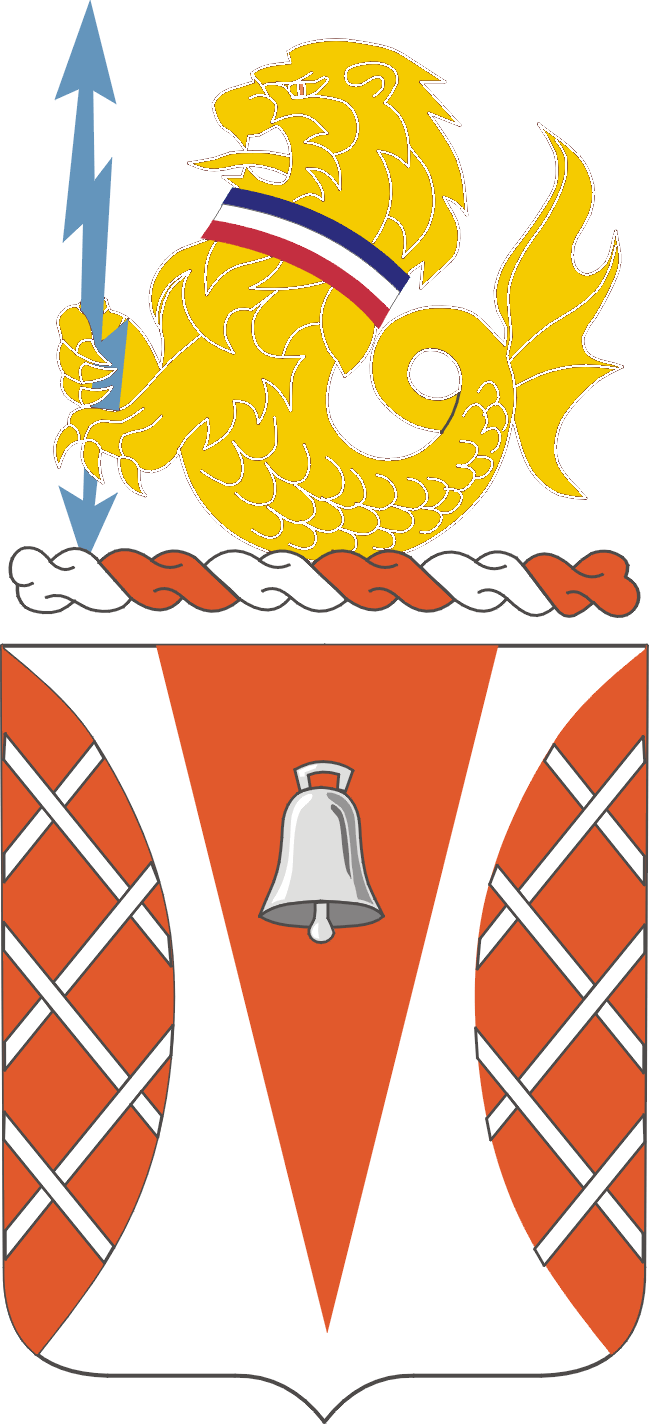
- Coat of Arms
- Active: 10 December 1941– 1 February 1946; 23 September 1986 – Present
- Country: United States
- Branch: Regular Army
- Part of: 15th Signal Brigade
- Garrison/HQ: Fort Gordon, Georgia
- Nickname: "Patriots"
- Mottos: "Watch and Warn"
- Decorations: Philippine Presidential Unit Citation; 17 October 1944 – 4 July 1945

Commanders
- Battalion Commander: LTC James T. Atkinson Jr. "Patriot 6"
- Command Sergeant Major: CSM Christopher E. Stadler "Patriot 7"

Insignia
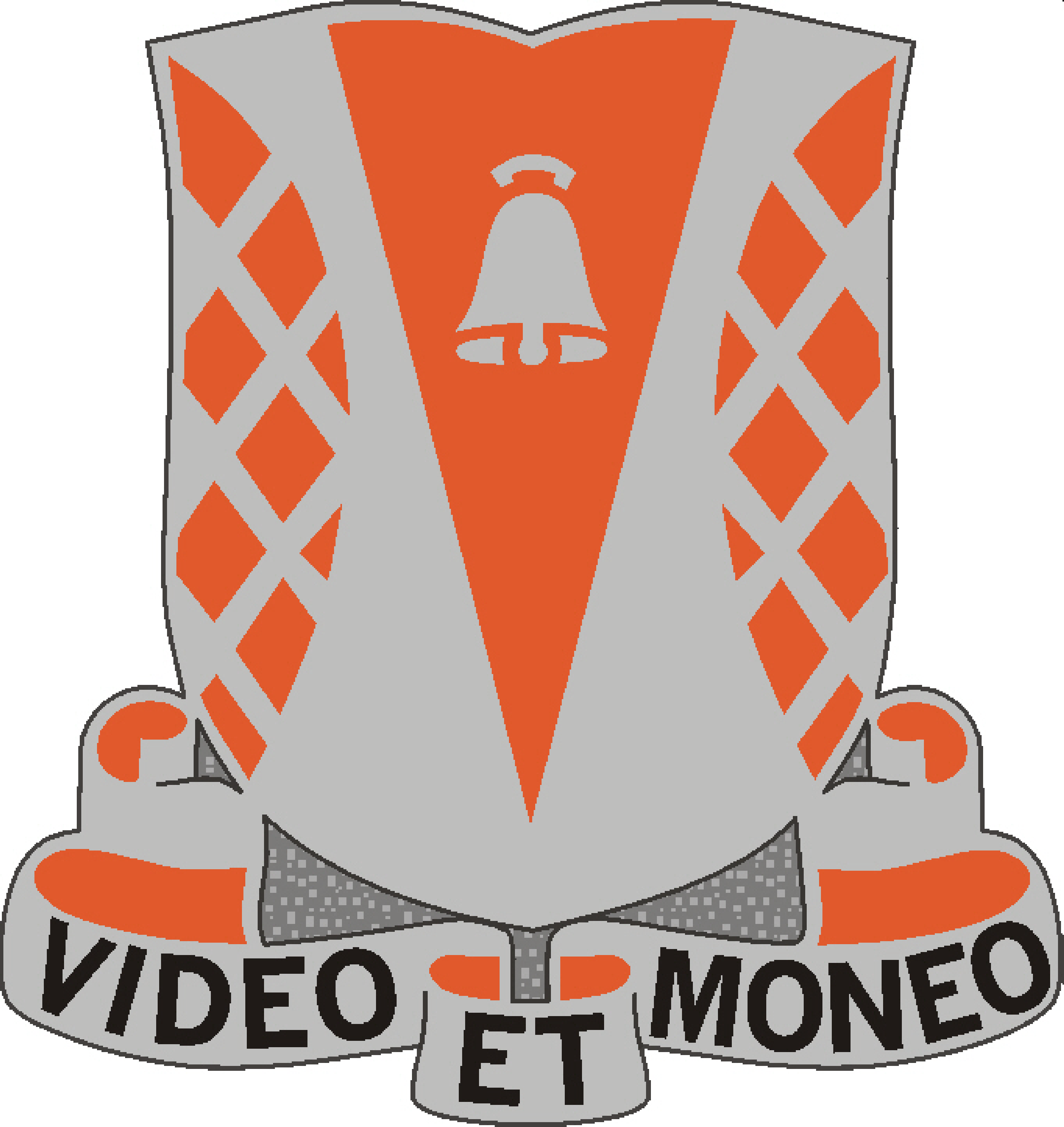
- Distinctive Unit Insignia

The 551st Signal Battalion is an active duty unit of the United States Army, housed on Fort Gordon. The MACOM for the 551st is (TRADOC) and they fall directly under the 15th Signal Brigade. The 551st trains the following Signal Corps MOSs:

25B – Information Technology Specialist
25H – Network Communication Systems Specialist

== History ==
551st Signal Battalion Lineage

- Constituted 10 December 1941 in the Army of the United States as the 551st Signal Aircraft Warning Battalion, Separated
- Activated 15 December 1941 at Fort Dix, New Jersey
- Redesignated 12 December 1942 as the 551st Signal Aircraft Warning Battalion
- Inactivated 1 February 1946 in the Philippine Islands
- Redesignated 23 September 1986 as the 551st Signal Battalion and allotted to the Regular Army; Headquarters concurrently transferred to the United States Army Training and Doctrine Command and activated at Fort Gordon, Georgia

== Structure ==
Headquarters and Alpha Company - Battalion staff, instructors, and prior service Soldiers obtaining a new MOS (MOS-Ts)

Bravo Company - 25H Network Communications Systems Specialist trainees

Charlie Company - 25H Network Communications Systems Specialist trainees

Delta Company - 25B – Information Technology Specialist trainees

Echo Company - 25B – Information Technology Specialist trainees

== Honors ==
Campaign Participation Credit

World War II: Northern Solomons; Leyte; Southern Philippines

Decorations

- Philippine Presidential Unit Citation for 17 October 1944 to 4 July 1945

Company A additionally entitled to:

- Army Superior Unit Award for 1999–2000
