= LDRSHIP =

US Army basic values

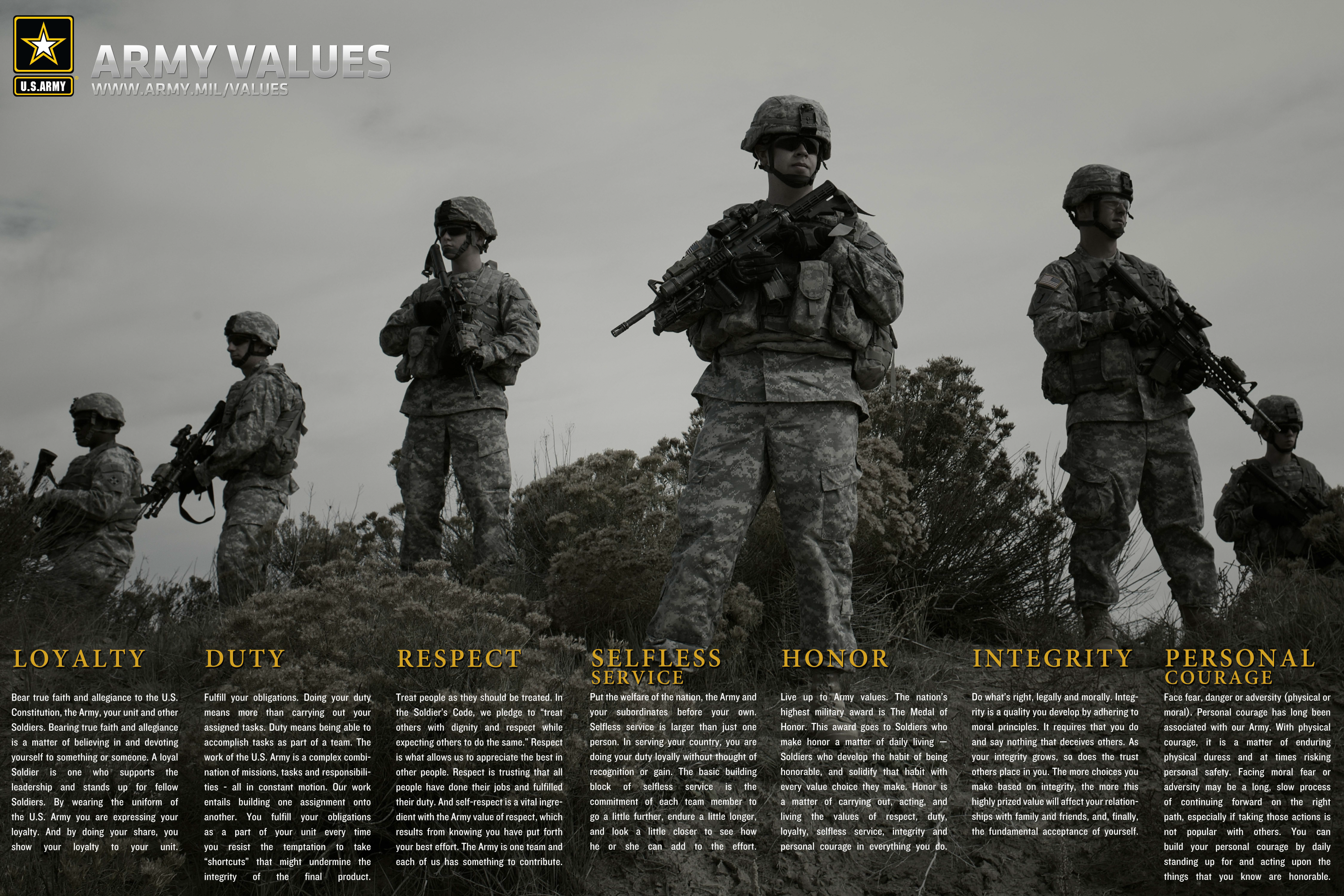
US Army Values poster

LDRSHIP (pronounced "leadership") is an acronym for the seven basic values of the United States Army:

1. Loyalty – bear true faith and allegiance to the U.S. Constitution, the Army, your unit and other soldiers.
2. Duty – Fulfill your obligations.
3. Respect – Treat people as they should be treated.
4. Selfless Service – Put the welfare of the nation, the Army, and your subordinates before your own.
5. Honor – Live up to all the Army values.
6. Integrity – Do what's right, legally and morally.
7. Personal Courage – Face fear, danger and adversity (physical or moral).

== See also ==
- Leadership
- Military bronies
- United States Army
- U.S. Soldier's Creed
