= Max Gilardi =

American internet personality (born 1988)

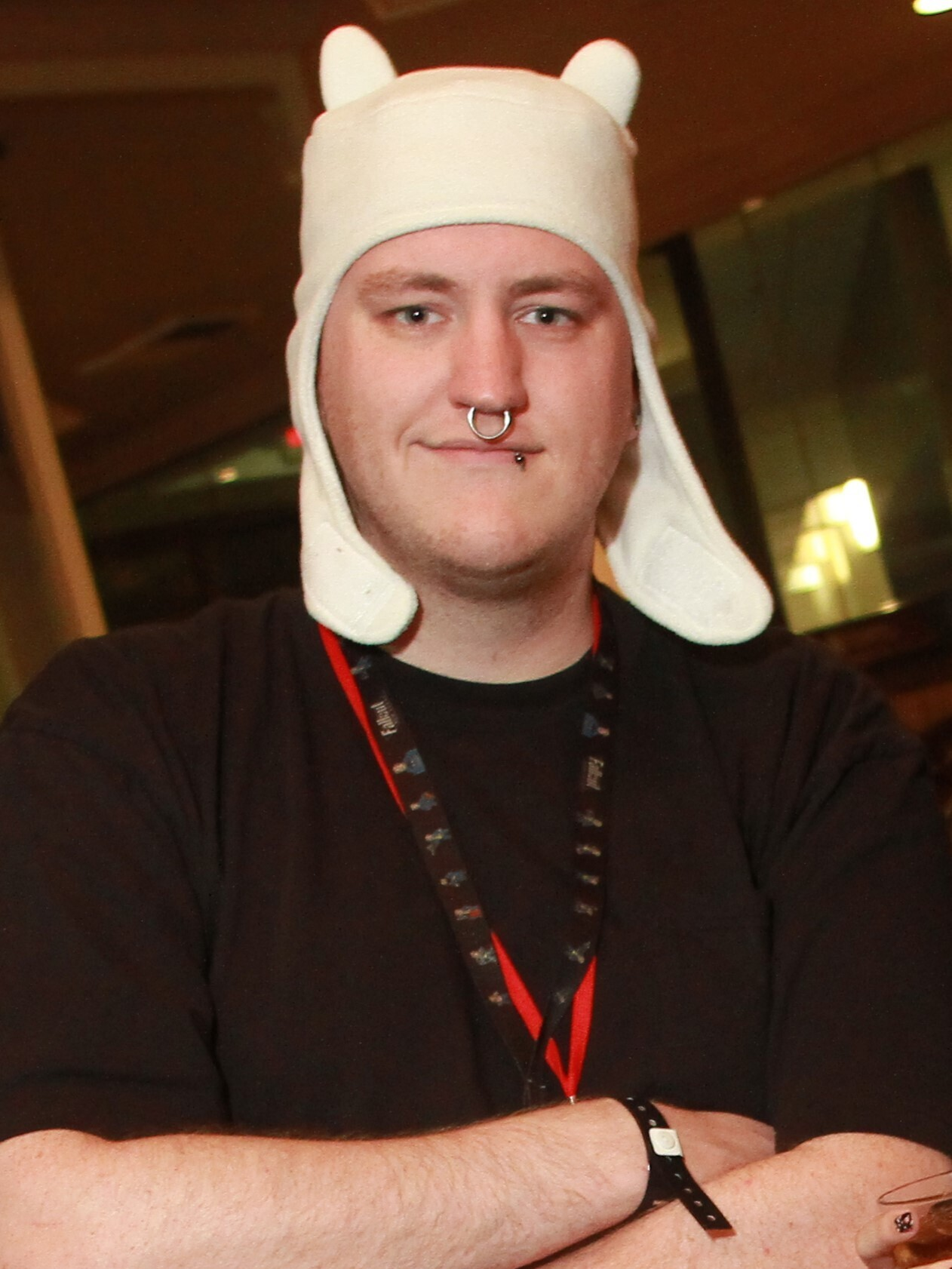
- Gilardi in 2014
- Born: Max John Gilardi; January 28, 1988 (age 38)
- Other name: hotdiggedydemon
- Education: Art Institute of Boston (dropped out)

YouTube information
- Channel: hotdiggedydemon
- Years active: 2003–present
- Genre: Comedy
- Subscribers: 2.18 million
- Views: 483 million
- Last updated: August 5, 2026
- Website: hotdiggedydemon.com

Max John Gilardi (/dʒɪˈlɑːrdi/ jil-AR-dee; born January 28, 1988), also known as Max G. or his pseudonym hotdiggedydemon, is an American internet personality, YouTuber, cartoonist, animator, and voice actor. He is best known for his PONY.MOV web series, a gorey adult-oriented parody of the popular children's animated television series My Little Pony: Friendship Is Magic, other viral videos, and his media analysis series known as Brain Dump.

== Life and career ==
Max John Gilardi (Note: "Hotdiggedydemon Tumblr". Tumblr. Tumblr. Retrieved August 4, 2024.) was born on January 28, 1988. He is of Italian descent and has an older sister. He attended the Art Institute of Boston briefly before dropping out after one of four years in an animation major.

=== 2003–2010: Early career ===
Gilardi, under the name "hotdiggedydemon", first started creating Flash animations in the mid-2000s on Newgrounds as a teenager. Among shorts, he would experiment in launching his own original cartoon. These early efforts included Adam Android, about a superpowered robot boy, and Spookyville USA, about a town of monsters. In 2007, he began uploading his work to his YouTube channel. That year, he created the Jerry series, a collection of web animations detailing the terrible and mundane life of a man named Jerry, and people related to him.

In 2010, he created the Wacky Game Jokez, 4 Kidz! series, starring a fictional criminal named Mickey the Dick who is kidnapped by a corporation specializing in video-game parody content. In addition to creating animations, Gilardi co-hosted the Wisenheimers podcast with fellow animator Yotam Perel, also known as LazyPillow or LazyMuffin, from 2010 to 2012.

=== 2011–2015: PONY.MOV and parody videos ===
From 2011 to 2013, Gilardi gained notoriety for releasing his six-part video parody of My Little Pony: Friendship Is Magic, PONY.MOV, an adult animated dark comedy web series in the art style of John Kricfalusi and Spümcø's The Ren & Stimpy Show. The series obtained a spin-off in the form of a Tumblr webcomic, Ask Jappleack, and each video highlights a different character from the main cast of the television series. Gilardi also gained notability for his comedic parodies of video games such as Five Nights at Freddy's, Cuphead, and Animal Crossing, due to their dark nature and subversive themes. The Animal Crossing parody has Isabelle, an innocent character in the game, worshipping Karl Marx.

=== 2016–present: Brain Dump ===
The majority of Gilardi's YouTube videos are self-made: written, animated, and voiced by himself. In his more recent projects, he has experimented with 3D animation in conjunction with his 2D work.

On September 2, 2016, Gilardi launched a new YouTube series titled Brain Dump in which he reviews movies and other media, often satirically. The series has since become the main focus of Gilardi's channel, with an overarching narrative exploring his career and the show's three main characters. Brain Dump stars Gilardi himself, a ghost named Goofball, and a living television named Burnbot. In 2018, Gilardi released the video THE APU THAT I KNOW - Brain Dump, a 45-minute documentary about The Simpsons character Apu Nahasapeemapetilon. It explores the 30-year history of the show and offers a critique of the 2017 documentary The Problem with Apu by Hari Kondabolu.

== Personal life ==
Avatar of Max (relaxed)

Max (relaxed)
Twitter
@BrainDumpTweets

JEEEEZ you guys okay fine haha jk just kidding!! Nevermind!! Jk just kidding jk jk!!

Aug 2, 2026

Avatar of Max (relaxed)

Max (relaxed)
Twitter
@BrainDumpTweets

Decided I'm not thinking clearly, will reassess

Aug 2, 2026

In November 2022, Gilardi came out as bisexual. On May 3, 2024, Gilardi revealed that he had been diagnosed with fibromyalgia, which had affected the scope of his animated work.

On August 1, 2026, he disclosed he had decided to seek euthanasia in Switzerland, as his fibromyalgia had become more debilitating, along with medical treatment for the condition becoming financially impossible. He also announced that he had developed chronic hypersalivation and tinnitus. On August 2, he stated on X that he was "not thinking clearly" and would reevaluate his choice. On August 4, Gilardi explained that he could no longer go through with his decision as support from fans and friends had made him feel guilty and ashamed, and he did not want to emotionally hurt his audience.

== Filmography ==
=== Web ===
Year	Title	Role	Notes	Ref.
2007–2009	Jerry	Jason, Junior	Creator	
2010	Eddsworld	Delivery Guy	1 episode: 'Hammer & Fail (Part 1)'	
2010	Wacky Game Jokez, 4 Kidz!	Mickey the Dick, June, Eric, The Boss	Creator	
2011–2013	PONY.MOV	Spike, Applejack, Rainbow Dash, Fluttershy, Pinkie Pie, various	Creator	
2016	Isabelle Ruins Everything	Mayor, various	Animator	
2016–2022	Brain Dump	Himself, Goofball, various	Creator	
2017	A Cuphead Cartoon	Cuphead, Mugman	Animator	

=== Television ===
Year	Title	Role	Notes	Ref.
2020	SpongeBob SquarePants		One-time storyboard artist ("Boss for a Day")	

=== Video games ===
Year	Title	Role	Notes	Ref.
TBA	Rolus in the Outskirts	Cylo	Voice	
