= Military bronies =

Military fans of My Little Pony

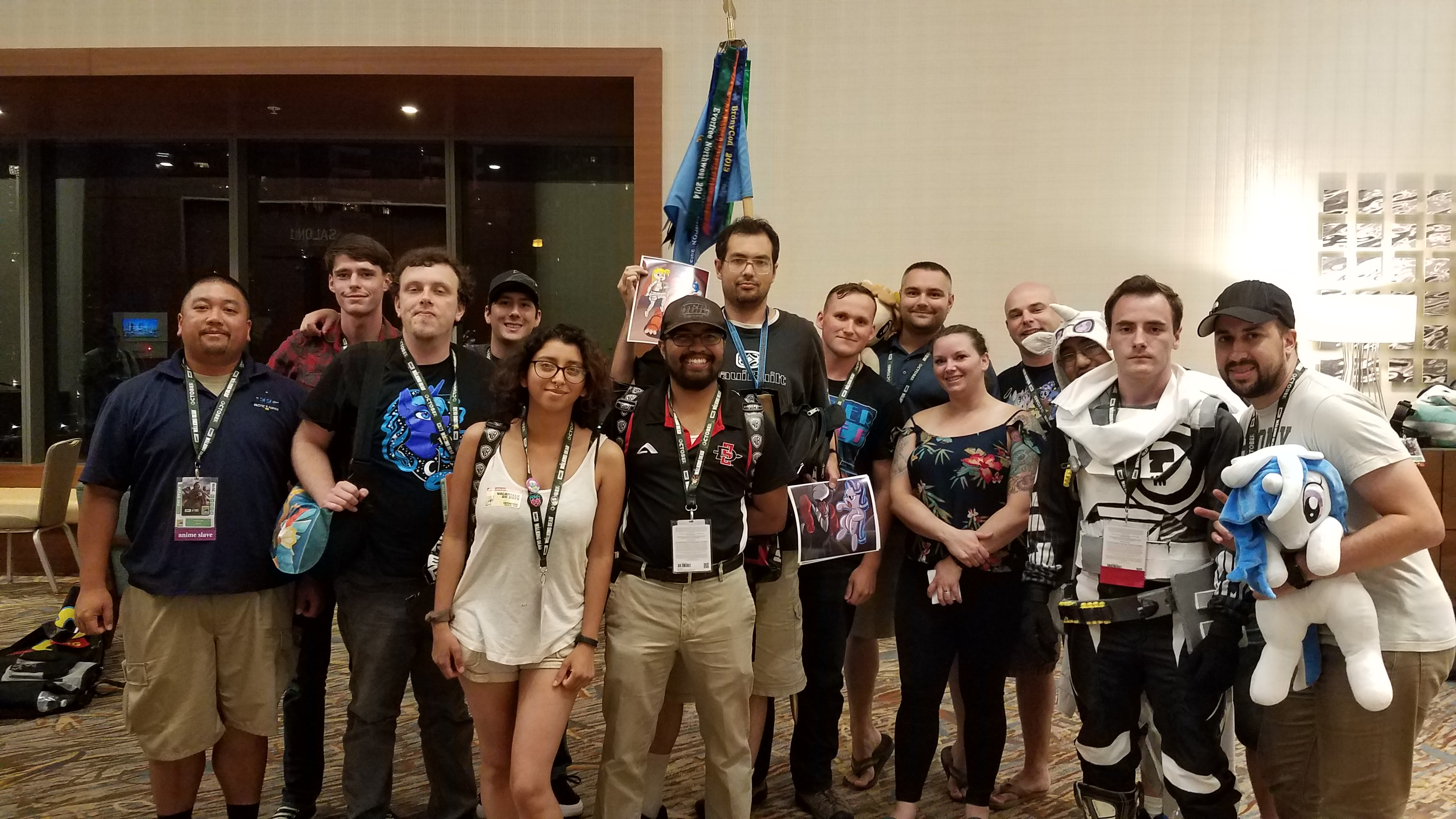
Military veteran, and non-veteran, fans of My Little Pony: Friendship is Magic, posing for a group photo after the panel "Bronies in Uniform" at San Diego Comic-Con 2018.

The My Little Pony: Friendship Is Magic fandom includes active-duty, retired, and prospective military service members, commonly referred to as military bronies. This fandom subculture, representing an estimated 4–5% of the overall brony population, gained media attention in the early 2010s due to their Internet-based community activities and incidents involving unauthorized patches on military uniforms.

The phenomenon has generated mixed reactions; some critics questioned the appropriateness of military personnel watching a children's show and raised concerns about uniform violations. Military bronies have publicly defended their fandom and have asserted their right to enjoy the show. Military bronies generally hold a place of honor among civilian members of the fandom.

Academics have analyzed the military bronies subculture as a challenge to traditional masculinity within military culture.

== Overview ==
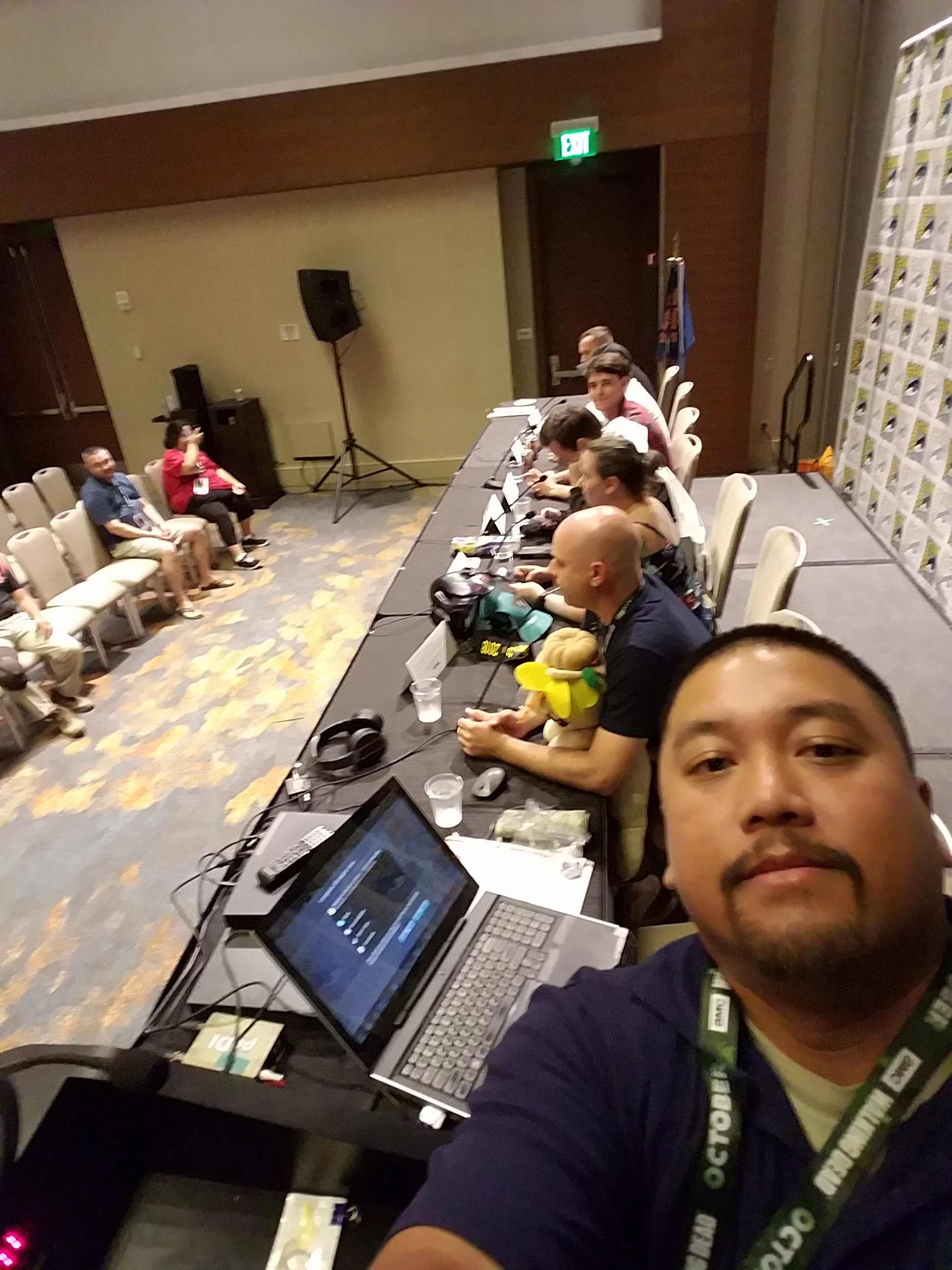
LCDR Ted Visser, TSgt Christine Sparks, Sgt Dylan Main, Cpl Zac Caruthers, SPC Jan P. Ducos, and LCpl Lyle Gilpatrick speak about their experience of being a brony and a service member in the United States Armed Forces.

According to a 2016 study published in the Journal of Fandom Studies, military bronies represent an estimated 4–5% of the overall brony population and are largely an Internet-based community. The military bronies Facebook page, which was created in 2012, had accumulated more than 2,600 members by the end of that year. By 2013, the page had over 8,000 members; by 2015, it had over 10,000. Military bronies also established dedicated websites and forums where members could display custom-made patches and discuss the show and fandom.

Military bronies consist of service members from all military branches, though according to Pacific Standard, "there is a perception among them that Marines are the majority." Some enlisted personnel have connected their military service to their appreciation of the show's themes. For example, military bronies have drawn parallels between the Elements of Harmony and the United States Army's core values, known by the acronym LDRSHIP (Loyalty, Duty, Respect, Selfless Service, Honor, Integrity, and Personal Courage).

At BronyCon 2012, military bronies received special recognition with a military-only lunch featuring voice actress Tara Strong, who voiced show protagonist Twilight Sparkle. Civilian bronies cheered when they spotted military personnel in uniform, with one National Guardsman recalling: "We barely made it up to the top steps and everyone outside was cheering for us."

In 2013, Joint Undergraduate Specialized Pilot Class 14–05 at Vance Air Force Base wore "My Little Pilot" patches during training. According to first lieutenant Thomas Barger, the patch was originally included "as an ironic joke" but was the only design approved, which prompted the class to embrace "the irony and humor of the patch."

At San Diego Comic-Con 2018, a "Bronies in Uniform" panel featured military bronies from multiple service branches discussing their experiences. The panel addressed topics like mental health challenges in the military and veteran suicide rates.

== Reception ==
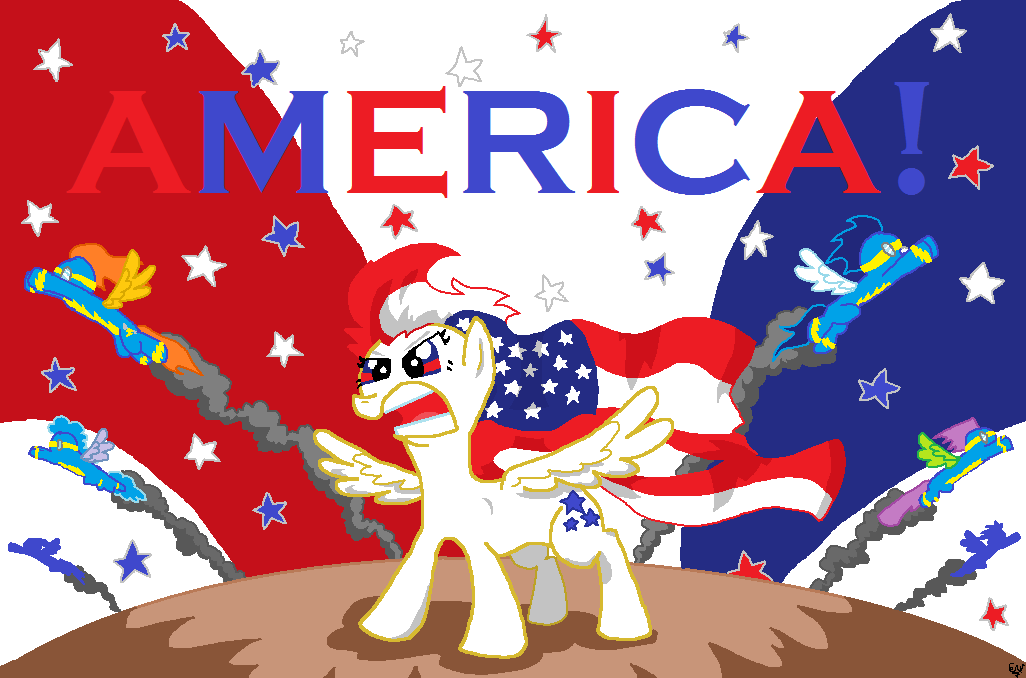
Fan art of a ponification of the United States

In July 2012, some critics raised concerns about uniform violations after it was reported that some military bronies were displaying cutie mark patches on their uniforms at BronyCon 2012. A Military Times commenter identified potential violations of wearing uniforms at unauthorized events and displaying non-sanctioned patches. In response to the incident, a Pentagon spokeswoman stated that "non-authorized, non-military patches are not authorized for wear on military uniforms." An administrator of the military bronies Facebook page wrote: "[T]here are plenty of ways to show your brony pride without running afoul of the uniform regulations. We are bronies, and we are professionals!"

Some critics have questioned the appropriateness of adult military personnel watching a children's show. One active-duty United States Army serviceman responded: "I am Active Duty Army, I possess a Top Secret security clearance as well as caveats above that, I have a wife and son, and I love to shoot things and watch things explode. Yet I am 'immasculine'? Don't like it? Move to Canada." A U.S. Air Force pilot stated: "I like Metallica, the Phillies, Sam Adams, Grand Theft Auto, Maxim magazine, Game of Thrones, Jackass, and My Little Pony. As Rainbow Dash would say: deal with it." One Air Force meteorologist wrote about his public expression as a brony by wearing fandom T-shirts: "I was apprehensive about the response I would get because military guys tend to be raw and macho. But I'm surprised at how many nerdy guys I keep meeting in the Air Force."

The Gazette reported that a mutual friend of two military bronies who became depressed and suicidal after losing a friend in the War in Afghanistan found comfort and healing by discovering and watching My Little Pony: Friendship Is Magic.

In 2012, Margaret Loesch, the then-CEO and President of The Hub (the television channel where Friendship Is Magic aired), noted from an email from a group of United States enlisted personnel in Afghanistan explained how they came by the show by way of their daughters, but found the emphasis on teamwork and covering each other's backs resonated with their military fellowship. Loesch stated: "Even though it's a show designed for little girls, the theme of friendship and honor and integrity and the moral center has relevance to them. That's pretty special."

Some military bronies have also reported experiencing bullying and harassment from fellow service members. At the 2018 Comic-Con panel, Navy LCDR Ted Visser described being "outed" as a brony in front of hundreds of personnel, which resulted in subordinates showing disrespect and at times refusing to follow his orders despite his rank.

== Analysis ==
In a 2016 study published in the Journal of Fandom Studies, Maria Patrice Amon conducted ethnographic research on military bronies through brony convention attendance, interviews, and analysis of fan content. Amon found that military bronies represent an estimated 4–5% of the overall brony population, and that approximately 95% of military bronies are male. Amon argued that military bronies challenge traditional ideas about masculinity because their military service gives them secure masculine credentials, which allows them to openly enjoy a show designed for young girls without losing their masculine identity. According to Amon, by expressing emotions and sensitivity (traits traditionally associated with women) while maintaining their roles as soldiers, military bronies expand what it means to be masculine in military culture.

In a 2022 study published in Polish journal Czas Kultury, Anna Reglińska-Jemioł wrote that the presence of pony fans within military circles presents a genuine social and cognitive challenge to traditional military culture. Reglińska-Jemioł emphasized that military bronies do not completely reject existing masculine norms but rather seek to expand understanding of masculinity by questioning some expectations of traditionally male behaviors. She argued that military bronies aim to create space for activities that can be associated with masculinity while allowing themselves to experience non-masculine innocence through conversations about friendship, emotions, and sharing feelings.

Kevin W. Martin of Pacific Standard called the military bronies phenomenon "a fascinating site of negotiations of masculinity in one of its strongest bastions." He also observed that "male military bronies at times suffer from the kind of stigma and bullying reserved for feminine men and, because they are also often assumed to be gay, homophobia."

== See also ==
- Military culture
- Hegemonic masculinity
- The Wonderbolts
