= The Fandom =

2020 American documentary film by Ash Kreis and Eric Risher

- Directed by: Ash Kreis; Eric Risher
- Produced by: Philip Kreis
- Starring: Samuel Conway; Sasha R. Jones; Michele Light; Mark Merlino; Rod O'Riley; Joe Strike
- Cinematography: Ash Kreis; Eric Risher
- Edited by: Eric Risher
- Music by: Iain Armour; Jared Clark
- Release date: 3 July 2020 (Worldwide)
- Running time: 89 minutes
- Country: United States
- Language: English
- Budget: $32,125

The Fandom is a 2020 independent documentary film focusing on the history and cultural influence of the furry fandom. Directed by filmmakers Ash Kreis and Eric Risher, it was released digitally and on Blu-Ray on July 3, 2020. The film is Kreis's directorial debut.

== Synopsis ==
The Fandom focuses on the furry fandom's early history and evolution as an internet community. The documentary features interviews from figures within the fandom, including Mark Merlino and Rod O'Riley (founders of ConFurence, the first furry convention), Joe Strike (author of Furry Nation and Furry Planet, books documenting the history of the fandom), and Samuel Conway, chairman of Pittsburgh's Anthrocon convention. These interviews are interspersed with footage from past and current furry conventions.

== Production ==
The Fandom was funded through Kickstarter with a budget of $32 thousand. Director Ash Kreis described to Pittsburgh Post-Gazette that despite recent positivity of furry fandom coverage, she wanted to put several misconceptions to rest and show the community in its true form.

The Fandom marks the directorial debut for Kreis, who previously worked in the production team for films like Being Evel.

== Release ==
The Fandom premiered on Kreis' YouTube channel on July 3, 2020, the Blu-Ray and other digital versions being released the same day.

== Reception ==
The Fandom was well-received and praised by critics. Cartoon Brew praised its inclusivity and humor, Colorado Springs Independent applauded the film for its appeal and its thorough detail. The film won an Ursa Major Award in 2020 in the Non-Fiction Work category.
