= SloFluffCon =

International furry convention, first held in 2023

SloFluffCon Slovenian Furry Convention
- SloFluffCon Flag
- Status: Active
- Genre: Furry Convention
- Frequency: Annual
- Venue: Grand Hotel Union Eurostars
- Location: Ljubljana
- Country: Slovenia
- Founder: HexagonHusky
- Website: slofluffcon.org

SloFluffCon (usually shortened to SFC) is an international furry convention, that takes place in Ljubljana, Slovenia. It is an event organized by furries, where participants from different countries come together and socialize, sharing their passion for anthropomorphic animals, culture, and art. All of these activities are strongly associated with the furry subculture. SloFluffCon is organized annually in Ljubljana, the capital of Slovenia in January.

== History of the convention ==
SloFluffCon 2026

SloFluffCon started with an idea in 2020, when the organizers at the time decided to create an international furry event that would bring together the furry community in Slovenia as well as the neighboring countries. With this in mind, they sought to organize the first international furry convention in Slovenia.

The first edition of SloFluffCon took place in 2023 at Hotel Evropa in the city of Celje. Numerous local and international furries attended the event.This edition of the convention was the first international gathering of furries in the Republic of Slovenia.

In 2024, SFC took place at the same venue as in its inaugural year. The event was also attended by the Mayor of the Urban Municipality of Celje. Uncle Kage, the chairman of Anthrocon, also attended the convention as a Guest of Honor.

The SFC organizers subsequently decided to move the event to the capital of Slovenia in 2025 to the Grand Hotel Union. Due to the relocation and the change of date, the next edition SloFluffCon was organized in 2026 with the theme Atomic Future. The guest of honor was Thabo Meerkat.

SloFluffCon will be organized again in January 2027 at the Grand Hotel Union in Ljubljana. It features the theme Everyday Heroes and the Guest of Honor Ronnie Noodles accompanied by two special guests, Uncle Kage and Alkali Bismuth.

== SloFluffCon timeline ==
SloFluffCon has been held since 2023. Each year a theme is chosen serving as the central inspiration for decorations, events, and the event's overall aesthetic. Since 2024, the event has featured a guest of honor, and from 2026 onwards, special guests as well.

Each theme represents an adventure of the convention's mascots. Those are a blue Dog, a red Cat, a green and orange Bat, and a golden yellow Buck. The table below lists all editions of SloFluffCon and their respective themes.

Ronnie Noodles – Guest of Honor 2027

Edition	Date	Location	Theme
SloFluffCon 2023	19–22 August 2023	Hotel Evropa, Celje, Slovenia	Secret Agents
SloFluffCon 2024	24–27 August 2024	Hotel Evropa, Celje, Slovenia	Mystery at the Hotel
SloFluffCon 2026	22–25 January 2026	Grand Hotel Union, Ljubljana, Slovenia	Atomic Future
SloFluffCon 2027	21–24 January 2027	Grand Hotel Union, Ljubljana, Slovenia	Everyday Heroes

== Central events ==
Uncle Kage – Guest of Honor 2024

- My First Furry Convention - Prepares newcomers for their first furry convention.
- Dealers' Den - Participants sell their products that are thematically related to all things furry.
- Group Photo - Everyone is brought together for an unforgettable group picture.
- Talent Show - Attendees showcase their talents and compete for a prize.
- International Snack Exchange - Attendees share and swap local snacks with one another in a delicious cultural exchange.
- Fursuit Walk - The event takes place on the streets of Ljubljana near the convention space.
- Furdance - Main event of the evening, featuring memorable DJs and top-notch sound and lighting systems.
- Attendee organized panels and events - Every year attendees are given the opportunity to organize their own events and panels within the convention; this also includes activities involving the guest of honor and other special guests.
