= Eurofurence =

European furry convention

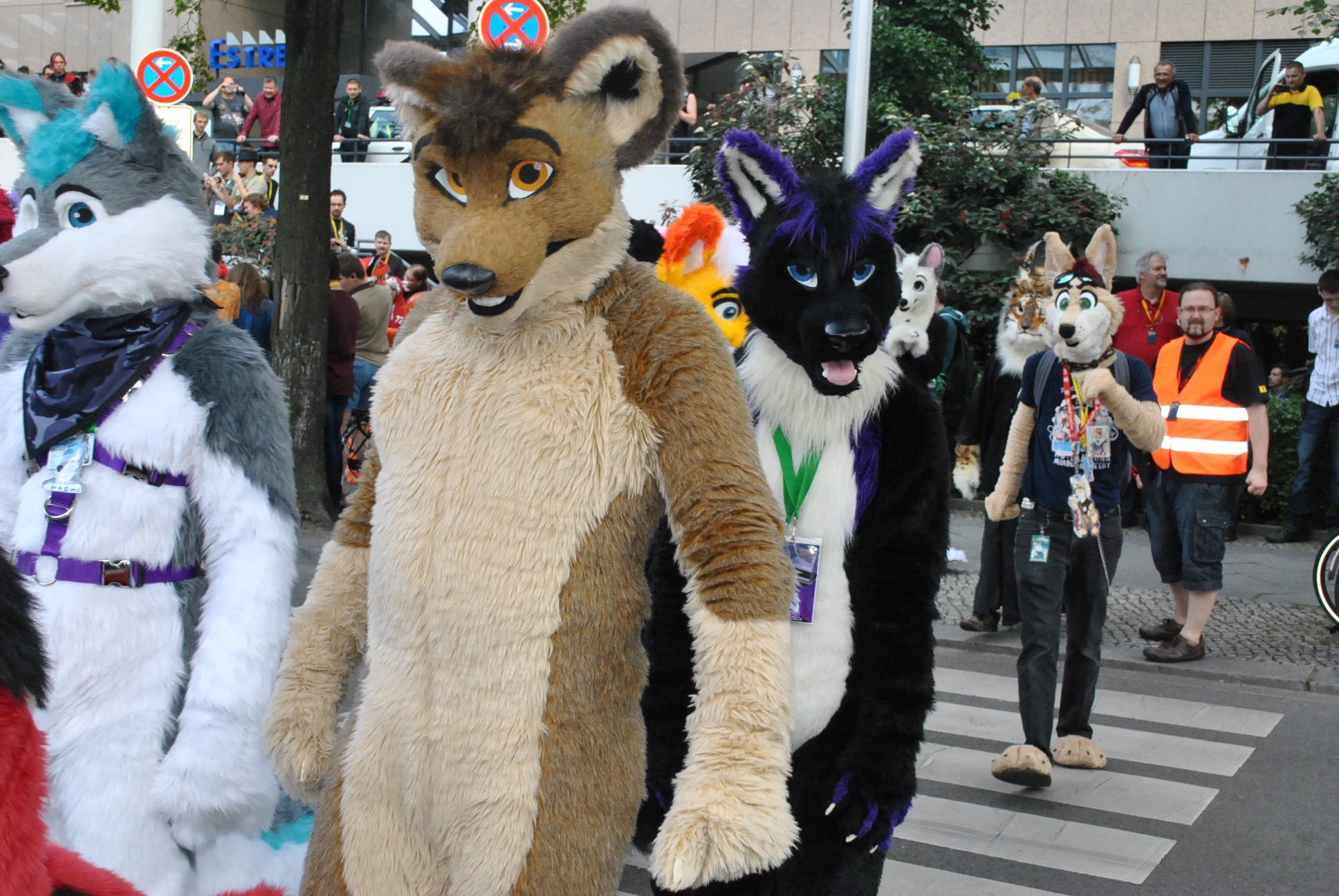
- Fursuiters at Eurofurence 2014
- Status: Active
- Genre: Furry
- Frequency: Annually
- Venue: Congress Center
- Locations: Hamburg, Germany
- Coordinates: 53°33′42.47″N 9°59′9.36″E
- Country: Germany
- Inaugurated: 30 June 1995
- Attendance: ▲6712 (2025)
- Organiser: Eurofurence e.V.
- Website: www.eurofurence.org

Eurofurence (commonly abbreviated EF) is a furry convention, initially held in changing places in Europe every year, but staying in Germany since 2004. It was originally started in 1995 as a private gathering by nineteen European furry fans who met on the Internet. The name of the convention derives from its then-contemporary American counterpart ConFurence, emphasising the European nature of the gathering.

As of 2019 Eurofurence was organized by volunteer efforts.

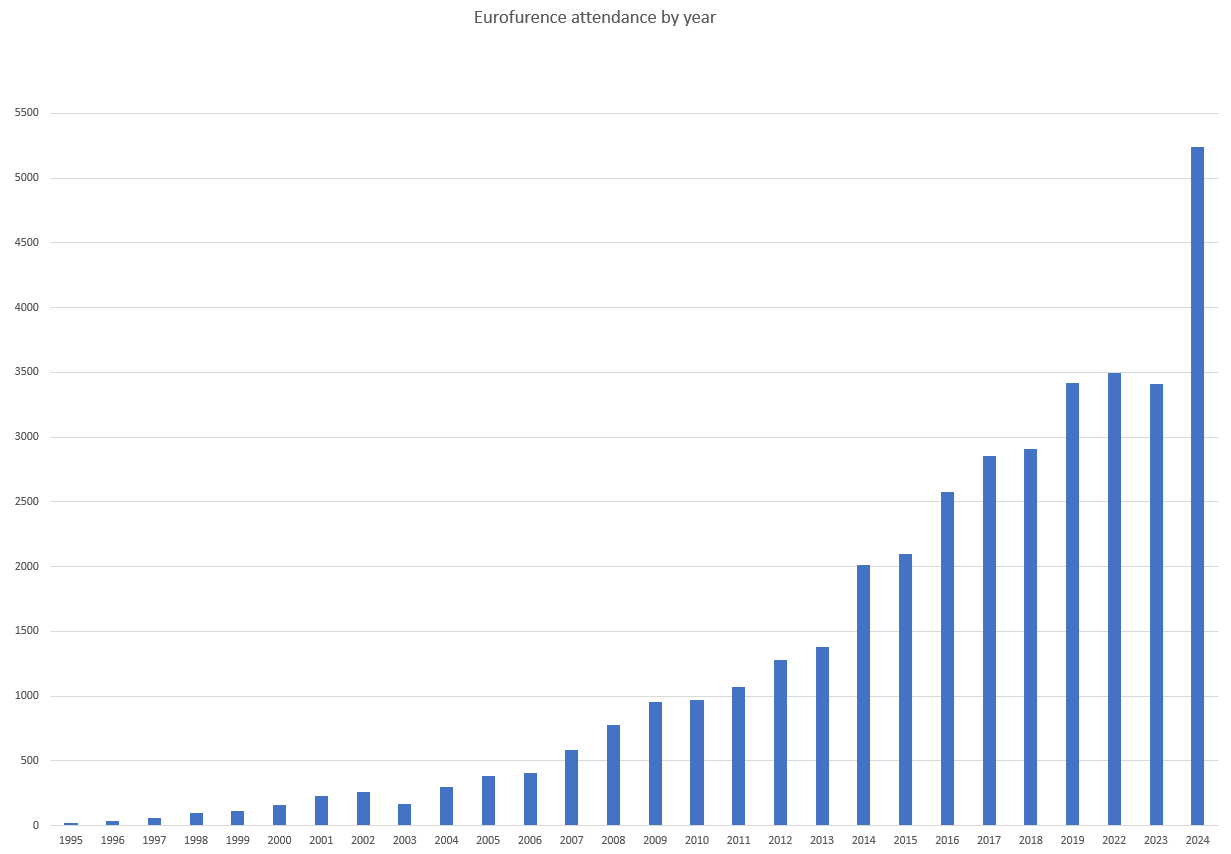
Graph of attendees at Eurofurence by year

== Eurofurence by year ==
Below is a table of statistics regarding each year Eurofurence has been held. Since 1999 (possibly except for 1996 and 1999), the convention has had at least one guest of honour yearly. Since 2002, the convention has had a "theme" every year, with T-shirt designs and venue "dressing" to reflect the theme.

| Convention | Dates | Location | Attendance | Theme | Guest(s) of Honour |
|---|---|---|---|---|---|
| Eurofurence 1 | 30 June–3 July 1995 | Kaiser-Wilhelm-Koog, Schleswig-Holstein, Germany | 19 | N/A | N/A |
| Eurofurence 2 | 18–22 July 1996 | Linköping, Östergötland, Sweden | 35 | N/A | N/A |
| Eurofurence 3 | 21–24 August 1997 | Bodstedt, Mecklenburg-Western Pomerania, Germany | 59 | N/A | N/A |
| Eurofurence 4 | 1–5 August 1998 | Heeze, North Brabant, Netherlands | 94 | N/A | N/A |
| Eurofurence 5 | 22–25 July 1999 | Berlin, Germany | 112 | N/A | Lisanne Norman, author of the Sholan Alliance series of books |
| Eurofurence 6 | 10–13 August 2000 | Göttingen, Lower Saxony, Germany | 160 | N/A | Unknown |
| Eurofurence 7 | 22–25 July 2001 | Kirchen (Sieg), Rhineland-Palatinate, Germany | 230 | N/A | Lisanne Norman; Lee "Chairo" Strom, Fursuiter, Puppeteer, and member of the Further Confusion organising team since 2003; Mark Merlino, co-founder of ConFurence, the original Furry Convention |
| Eurofurence 8 | 15–18 August 2002 | Oberbernhards, Hesse, Germany | 260 | The F.I.A. (Furry Intelligence Agency) | Dr Samuel "Uncle Kage" Conway, Chairman of Anthrocon |
| Eurofurence 9 | 21–24 August 2003 | Samopše, Středočeský kraj, Czech Republic | 165 | Cunning Little Vixens | Dr Samuel "Uncle Kage" Conway, Chairman of Anthrocon |
| Eurofurence 10 (Note: commonly called EFX by the organisation committee) | 26–29 August 2004 | Olpe, North Rhine-Westphalia, Germany | 295 | EFX : The Movie | Timothy Albee, Creator of Kaze: Ghost Warrior |
| Eurofurence XI | 21–24 July 2005 | Nürnberg, Bavaria, Germany | 380 | Songs of the Old Ages | Heather Alexander, Celtic Folk/World Rock Musician |
| Eurofurence 12 | 23–27 August 2006 | Nürnberg, Bavaria, Germany | 405 | The Hounds of Blackwhite Castle | Dark Natasha, furry artist, winner of Best Anthropomorphic Published Illustration at the Ursa Major Awards in 2002 |
| Eurofurence 13 | 5–9 September 2007 | Suhl, Thuringia, Germany | 585 | The Unlucky Thirteen | Lance Ikegawa, costume designer and Steve Gallacci, Creator of Albedo. (Note: Steve Gallacci was unable to attend the convention due to family matters.) Alexander James Adams appeared as musical guest. (Note: Conference Guests page (2007).) |
| Eurofurence 14 | 27–31 August 2008 | Suhl, Thuringia, Germany | 777 | From Dusk till Dawn | Watts Martin, writer and fanzine editor/publisher, and Steve Gallacci. (Note: Conference Guests page (2008).) |
| Eurofurence 15 | 26–30 August 2009 | Suhl, Thuringia, Germany | 955 | 1001 Arabian Nights | Jimmy Chin, furry artist and fursuiter |
| Eurofurence 16 | 1–5 September 2010 | Magdeburg, Saxony-Anhalt, Germany | 973 | Serengeti | Stan Sakai, comic author, creator of Usagi Yojimbo |
| Eurofurence 17 | 17–21 August 2011 | Magdeburg, Saxony-Anhalt, Germany | 1,066 | Kung Fur Hustle | Jim Martin, a distinguished Puppeteer |
| Eurofurence 18 | 29 August–2 September 2012 | Magdeburg, Saxony-Anhalt, Germany | 1,278 | Animalia Romana | Peter S. Beagle, novel and fantasy fiction author, creator of The Last Unicorn (Note: Guest of Honor (2012).) |
| Eurofurence 19 | 21–25 August 2013 | Magdeburg, Saxony-Anhalt, Germany | 1,376 | Aloha Hawaii! | Warrick Brownlow-Pike, Andy Heath and Iestyn Evans from the BBC comedy "Mongrels" (Note: Guests of Honor (2013)) |
| Eurofurence 20 | 20–24 August 2014 | Berlin, Germany | 2,015 | CSI Berlin | Kyell Gold, Ursula Vernon, Sofawolf Press and Sardyuon |
| Eurofurence 21 | 19–23 August 2015 | Berlin, Germany | 2,095 | Greenhouse World | Rhubarb the Bear and Cosmik |
| Eurofurence 22 | 17–21 August 2016 | Berlin, Germany | 2,573 | Back to the 80s | Dorothy Hearst, Author of The Wolf Chronicles book trilogy |
| Eurofurence 23 | 16–20 August 2017 | Berlin, Germany | 2,853 | Ancient Egypt | Pepper Coyote (Musician) and Clockwork Creature (costume and design studio) |
| Eurofurence 24 | 22–26 August 2018 | Berlin, Germany | 2,911 | Aviators - Conquer the Sky | Joaquin Baldwin (Animator, photographer) |
| Eurofurence 25 | 14–18 August 2019 | Berlin, Germany | 3,414 | Fractures in Time | Claudya 'AlectorFencer' Schmidt, Author of Myre |
| Eurofurence 26 | 24–28 August 2022 (Originally 19–23 August 2020) | Berlin, Germany | 3,495 | Welcome to Tortuga | Fox Amoore and JoJoe |
| Eurofurence 27 | 3–7 September 2023 | Hamburg, Germany | 3,408 | Black Magic | Pechschwinge |
| Eurofurence 28 | 18–21 September 2024 | Hamburg, Germany | 5,241 | Cyberpunk | Iris Schleuss |
| Eurofurence 29 | 3–6 September 2025 | Hamburg, Germany | 6,712 | Space Expedition — Outer Space Adventures | Nomax |
| Eurofurence 30 | 19-23 August 2026 | Hamburg, Germany | 9,139 | Fantastic Furry Festival | Animal Art Crimes |

== Main events ==
- Pawpet show - Furry handpuppet story with custom plot, music and effects
- Enter the Arena - Fursuit dance contest
- Big Blue Dance - Disco with live DJ, light effects and live mixed background animations
- Group Photo
- Fursuit parade
- Art Auction - Bidding for art
- Dealers' Den - Possibility to sell/buy merchandise and art
- DDR Tournament
