= 2014 Midwest FurFest gas attack =

Chemical attack in Illinois, U.S.

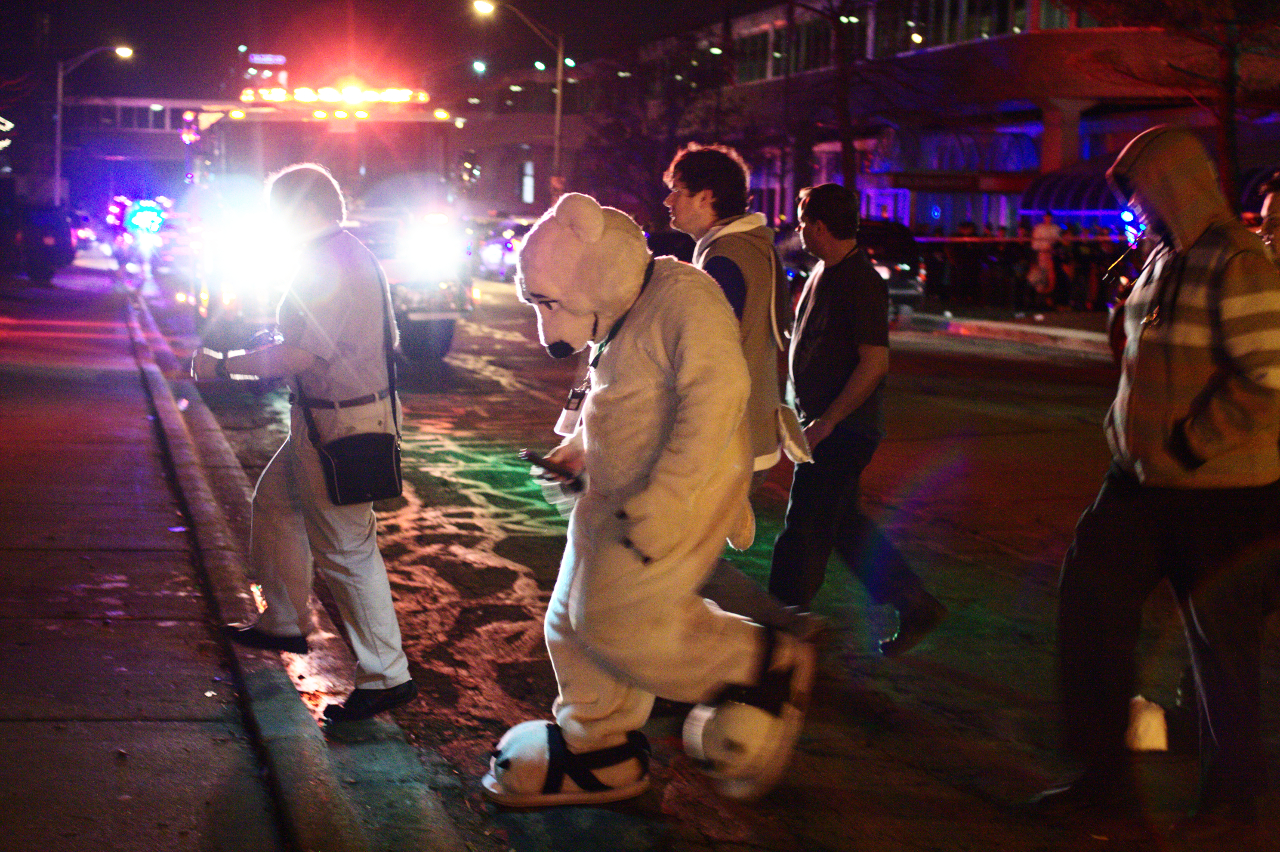
- Convention goers returning after the evacuation
- Location: 41°58′52″N 87°51′33″W; Hyatt Regency O'Hare, Rosemont, Illinois
- Date: December 7, 2014; 11 years ago c. 12:45 a.m. (CST)
- Target: Attendees at Midwest FurFest
- Attack type: Mass poisoning
- Weapon: Chlorine gas
- Deaths: 0
- Injuries: 40+
- Perpetrator: Unknown
- Motive: Unknown

On December 7, 2014, Midwest FurFest was targeted by a chlorine gas attack, hospitalizing 19 attendees. At the time, Midwest FurFest was the second-largest furry convention in the United States, with over 5,400 attendees. The convention took place at the Hyatt Regency O'Hare hotel in Rosemont, Illinois, from December 5 to 7.

== Timeline ==
Around 12:45 a.m. on the final night of the convention, the Rosemont Public Safety Department received several reports of a noxious odor on the ninth floor of the hotel. At 1:10 a.m. the hotel was evacuated and guests were sent to the Stephens Convention Center. Hazmat technicians decontaminated the area for two hours and the building was reopened at 4:21 a.m.

== Investigation ==
Firefighters investigating the scene found a broken glass jar filled with white powder on the ninth floor of the emergency stairway, as well as a liquid on the walls. The air in the stairwell and in the hotel's large atrium both registered high levels of chlorine gas. The concentration within the stairwell was measured above 60 ppm, surpassing the meter's maximum range. Samples of both the powder and liquid were taken, but due to improperly calibrated equipment the results were inconclusive. In the hours after the gas leak, the Rosemont police said the evidence "suggests an intentional act" and began a criminal investigation. In the following days, the police and FBI interviewed suspects, hotel guests and employees, and hospital workers, among others. The FBI continued to interview suspects until 2019, when the Illinois statute of limitations ran out. As of 2026, nobody has been charged in this case.

According to a sergeant of the Rosemont Public Safety Department interviewed by the FBI, over 40 people were treated and evaluated by emergency medical services, with 19 requiring hospitalization.

== Media coverage ==
On December 8, the MSNBC show Morning Joe was covering the attack. While reporting the news, hosts Mika Brzezinski and Joe Scarborough started laughing, leaving Willie Geist to finish reading the segment. The broadcast cut to an interview with Dr. Samuel Conway, and when the hosts returned, Mika Brzezinski was running out of the studio. Many furries were offended by this dismissive coverage of the event.

In 2024, reporter Nicky Woolf released Fur & Loathing, an investigative podcast series about the event. The podcast interviewed two of the FBI's prime suspects in the case, including Robert Sojkowski (AKA Magnus Diridian), a well known controversial figure within the fandom. Fur & Loathing was featured in Time's "Best Podcasts of 2024 So Far" article and Bloomberg Businessweek's 2024 "Jealousy List".
