= Fursona =

Personalized animal character created by the furry fandom

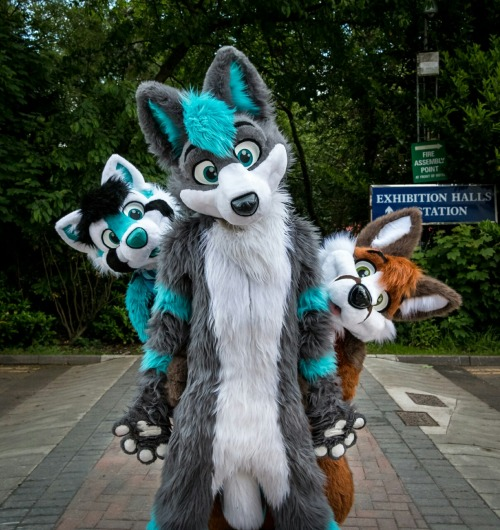
Three people dressed in fursuits, representative of their respective fursonas

A fursona (US: /fɜːrˈsoʊnə/ UK: /fɜːˈsəʊnə/, a portmanteau of "furry" and "persona") is a personally claimed persona resembling an anthropomorphic figure (usually an animal) adopted by a member of the furry fandom. Fursonas can provide numerous roles for the creator, such as improving self-esteem, creativity, and helping them to achieve their character's ideal traits in real life. A majority of fandom members have at least one fursona, with the International Anthropomorphic Research Project estimating that the average furry has about two to three fursonas over the course of their life.

Some individuals' fursonas are acted out primarily online, but also at furry conventions and in other public spaces. Acting out one's fursona in person may involve wearing a fursuit, a physical representation of a fursona, or pieces thereof, depending on the activity. Another small minority express a desire to become, or already see themselves as, belonging to their fursona species. These people may additionally identify as therians or otherkin.

== History and etymology ==
The term "fursona" is a portmanteau of the words "furry" and "persona". The first known use of the word was in 1997.

According to Fred Patten, it was common for attendants to use their real names or nicknames at ConFurence (world's first furry convention) in 1989.A 1988 flier for ConFurence zero includes a table where participants can make their own furry character. A 1989 conbook for Confurence Zero also states:

Furries is a catch-all term for anthropomorphic characters (Funny Animals) that represent an actual living person. This person may be the creator of the character or someone else the creator knows. A person’s Furry is a personal statement about one’s-self or a friend. The concept of personal animal personas is not a new one. The most familiar example is the ‘Totem’ of the American Indians. In some tribes, an individual selected an animal as a guiding spirit and teacher. The modern idea is really not much different.

— Confurence 0 Conbook

According to Patten, during the early 1990s, new attendants to the convention adopted personas for roleplay; many did not use their real names, instead using the names of their furry personas. Fursonas later became commonplace in the fandom by the mid-1990s.

== Roles of fursonas ==
Fursonas can provide numerous roles for the creator, whether it be idealized versions of their adopter, fleshed out roleplay characters, or digital mascots. Typically, furries who view the fandom more as a hobby than a lifestyle use them more as characters than self representations.

== Fursona species ==
Despite what the name would suggest, fursonas are not restricted to furred animals and may be any animal species, whether it be real, mythological, fictional, extinct, or hybrid creatures.

According to the Anthropomorphic Research Project, among the most common fursona species are wolves, foxes, dogs, red pandas, mustelids, marsupials, big cats, dragons and hybrids; less common examples for fursonas include rodents, rabbits, reptiles, birds, cows, deer, goats, cetaceans, bugs, and horses; furries most rarely use non-human primates as the basis for their fursona.

=== Open species ===
In the furry fandom, "open species" refer to fictional species that are freely available for anyone to use in creating their own characters. The term is used in contrast with "closed species", indicating that a character design can only be used or created with the species owner's permission.

==== Protogens ====
A partial fursuit of a protogen

Protogens are a "cyborg alien race" created in the late 2010s. Protogens are a popular species in the fandom; it is estimated 2% of furries have a protogen fursona. Some members of the fandom have created fursuits based on the species with LED lights able to create facial expressions and mouths that sync up with the fursuiter's voice.

==== Sergals ====
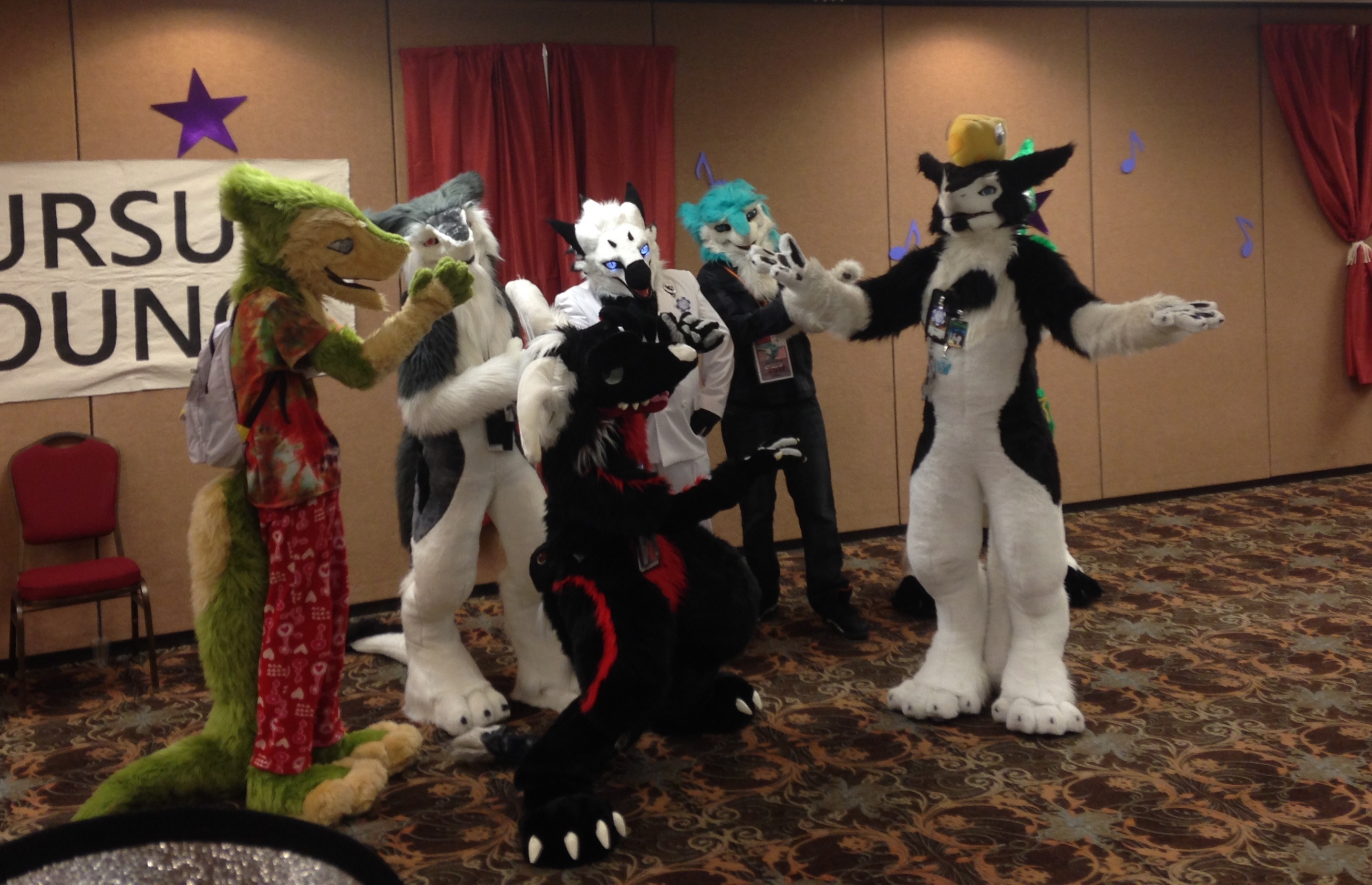
A group of sergal fursuiters at a convention

Sergals are a fictional species of animal, described as a cross between a rabbit, shark, and a wolf. As an original species, they are sometimes denigrated by other furries for being seen as trendy.

==== Dutch angel dragons ====
The creator of Dutch angel dragons in her fursuit at Anthrocon 2026

Dutch angel dragons (sometimes abbreviated as DADs) are species of winged dragons covered in fur who act as guardian angels. Dutch angel dragons have no gender or sex. The name is not related with the country of the Netherlands; rather, the name came from the creator's horse, named Dutch. They are popular species in the fandom, with fursuits and thousands of art pieces on Fur Affinity. Despite their popularity, a minority group of members of the fandom disapprove Dutch angel dragons' usage as a fursona due to them being viewed as trendy, similar to sergals.

=== Closed species ===
Closed species in the furry fandom indicate that only a restricted number of people are allowed to create characters of that species. Since the species is owned by a creator (usually an artist), they decide who creates a fursona of that species and how they do so. Certain traits, lore, and colors are limited to the species' requirements; the species can be obtained several ways, usually through auctions and character purchases.

=== Real-life species ===
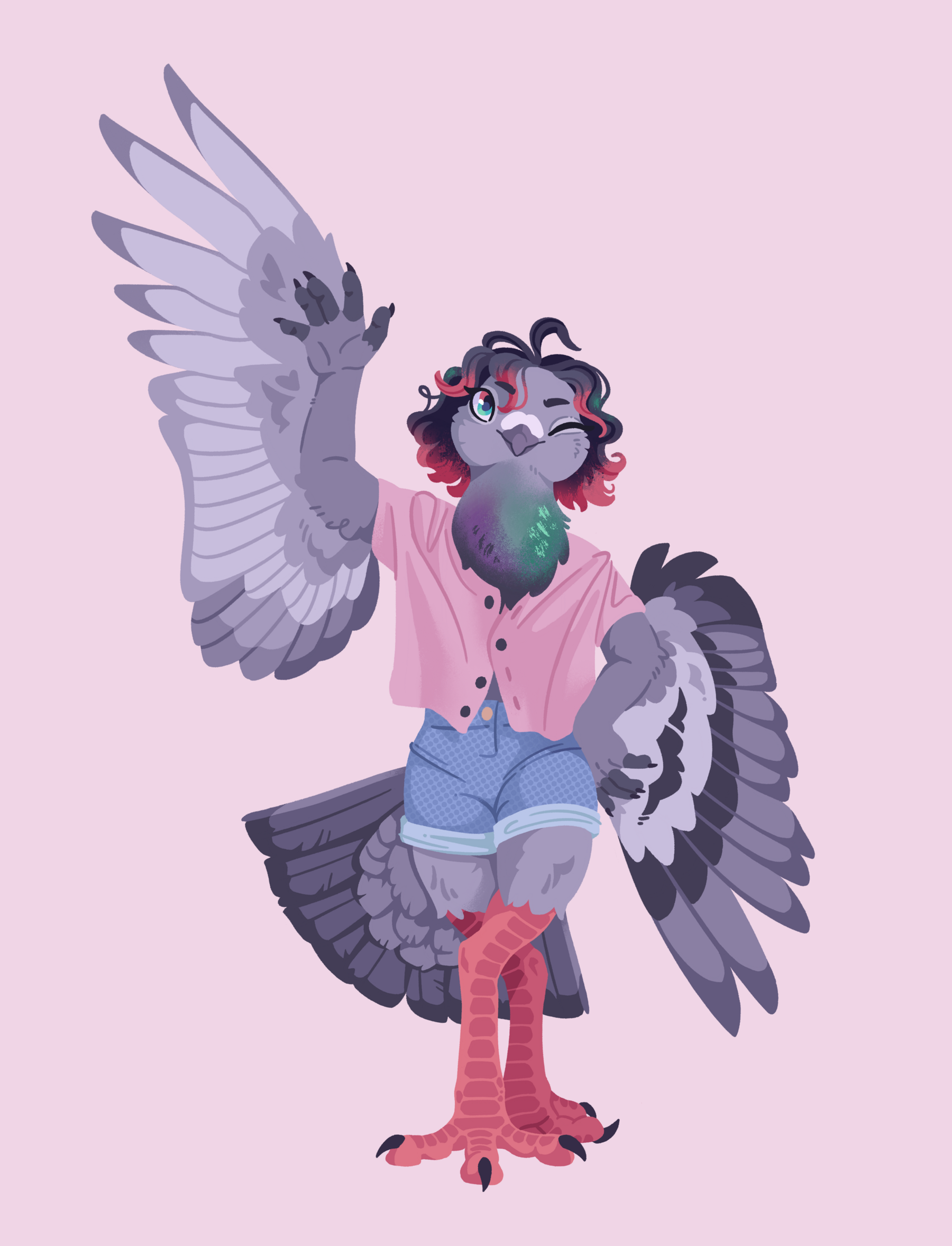
A fursona based on the rock dove

Most furries opt for real-life animal species as the basis for their characters. The most popular of which are wolves, foxes, dogs, and large cats, though any other species can be chosen as well. Uncommon fursonas include rabbits, horses, reptiles, avians, bears, deer, and aquatic creatures.

The reasons behind a fursona's species vary, the most common is having shared characteristics, while internal connections, admired traits, and aesthetic preferences are also common reasons. Rarely, some will choose their fursona's species based on spiritual reasons, sharing a physical resemblance with the animal, or from the belief that they were that species in a past life.

=== Statistics ===
==== 2016 ====
Popular fursona species
Species	Percentage	Species	Percentage
Hybrid	14.6	Avian	1.5
Wolf	14.3	Bear	1.4
Fox	10.6	Horse	1.4
Dog	9.0	Aquatic	1.2
Big Cat	8.4	Hyena	1.0
Dragon	7.6	Skunk	0.9
Mythical	4.1	Marsupial	0.7
Cat	4.1	Dinosaur	0.7
Other	3.1	Deer	0.6
Rodent	3.0	Feline	0.6
Rabbit	2.2	Squirrel	0.4
Raccoon	1.9	Ferret	0.4
Reptile	1.7	Canine	0.3
Otter	1.7	Insect	0.1

==== 2023 ====
Table based on surveys between 2017 and 2022
Species	Percentage	Species	Percentage	Species	Percentage	Species	Percentage	Species	Percentage
Other	27.8%	Shapeshifter	4.4%	Other Reptile	2.4%	Mouse/Rat	1.5%	Snake	0.9%
Wolf	19.1%	Custom	3.8%	Raccoon	2.4%	Red Panda	1.4%	Unicorn	0.8%
Fox	16%	Deer	3.4%	Monster	2.2%	Skunk	1.4%	Raven	0.7%
Hybrid	14.4%	Rabbit	3.2%	Pokémon	2.1%	Gryphon	1.3%	Owl	0.7%
Dragon	13.5%	Hyena	3%	Protogen	2.1%	Taur	1.2%	Crow	0.7%
Dog	12.5%	Lion	2.8%	Other bird	2.1%	Dinosaur	1.1%	Squirrel	0.6%
Domestic cat	7.7%	Bear	2.7%	Otter	2%	Shark	1%	Phoenix	0.6%
Other big cat	5.8%	Snow Leopard	2.6%	Horse	1.9%	Kangaroo	0.9%	Insect	0.6%
Mythical	5.3%	Coyote	2.6%	Goat	1.7%	Cow	0.9%	Hawk	0.5%
Tiger	4.5%	Werewolf	2.6%	Bat	1.5%	Ferret	0.9%		

== Fursona creation ==
The creation of a fursona has been described as "one of the most universal behaviors in the furry fandom". One study found that furries also tend to create fursonas to distinguish themselves from each other.

Although the inspiration varies from individual to individual, many furries describe their fursona being inspired by their favorite media or mythology. However, the majority state that their fursona was primarily internally generated. The majority of furries also cite shared characteristic as a reason for choosing a particular species. These are usually archetypal traits as ascribed to the species by humans, as opposed to actual animal behaviors. Some popular fursona species are particularly strongly associated with certain traits, for example, dogs being considered 'loyal' or rabbits being considered 'promiscuous'.

Some furries state that they simply have an innate connection to their chosen species. A small minority believes that their chosen species was a past life, is a spirit guide, or that they were supposed to be born as such. These notions overlap strongly with the experiences of otherkin and shapeshifting.

Furries often take a long time to decide on their fursona. 25 to 50% of furries surveyed have had more than one original character over the course of their lives, and about 25% stated that they had more than one concurrently. Furries with multiple fursonas usually do not see them as representing multiple selves, but facets of the same self, possibly related to how they express themselves in different social contexts. Additionally, the characteristics of a fursona may change over time along with its owner. This is usually in personality, but species may change as well.

Just as art is central to the furry fandom in general, it also plays a critical role in the creation and representation of fursonas. Furries who are not artistic themselves may commission artwork of their fursona from other members of the fandom as part of the creation process.

== Psychology ==
American sociologist Jake Dunn argues that a furry's fursona cannot be separated from their own sense of self, and many furries in fact see the performance of their fursona as a way of being their 'truest' self.

On average, furries rate their fursonas higher than themselves on all dimensions of the big five personality traits. They view their fursonas as having more desirable traits than they do, and fewer undesirable traits. Various researchers suggest that there is an extent to which fursonas serve as idealized versions of their owners. Projecting this idealized self can ease social tensions and reduce social anxiety. Dunn also argues that eventually, these idealized traits are incorporated back into the self. While he notes that the most common idealized traits given to fursonas are also considered ideal by society at large, S. E. Roberts et al. hypothesize that to some, fursonas serve as a safe way to explore traits that are socially undesirable.

Furries are often highly concerned with their fursona being unique. When they deem that their fursona has been 'copied', their sense of self may be threatened.

Furries may use their fursonas to explore their conceptualization of their gender and presentation, and some fursonas have a different gender, age, or sexual orientation than that of their creator. In a 2016 study concerning the negotiation and performance of identities by the furry community, multiple research participants emphasized the importance of costuming and fursonas in exploring one's gender identity or sexual orientation. Transgender furries with a sense of gender identity and generalized identity that does not match their physical appearance or sex assigned at birth frequently possess a fursona or fursonas that present their idealized selves. Similar situations exist for those with other kinds of body dysphoria and related struggles.

== See also ==
- Ponysona – Personalized pony character created by the brony fandom

== Bibliography ==
=== References ===
- Patten, Fred (17 January 2017). Furry Fandom Conventions, 1989-2015. McFarland. ISBN 978-1-4766-2688-8.
- Plante, Courtney N.; Reysen, Stephen; Adams, Camielle; Roberts, Sharon E.; Gerbasi, Kathleen C., eds. (2023). Furscience: A Decade of Psychological Research on the Furry Fandom. Commerce, Texas, USA: International Anthropomorphic Research Project. ISBN 978-0-9976288-3-8.
