= Eufuria =

Furry convention in Albany, New York

- Status: Active
- Genre: Furry
- Frequency: Annually
- Venue: Cafe Euphoria; Albany Capital Center
- Locations: Albany, New York, U.S.
- Country: United States
- Inaugurated: 2023
- Most recent: 2026
- Attendance: ▲1,191 (2026)
- Organizer: Society of Capital Region Events and Entertainment, Inc.
- Filing status: 501(c)(7)
- Website: eufuria.org

Eufuria is a furry convention that has taken place annually in Albany, New York since 2023. Held at the Albany Capital Center, the convention was started by Riley Lynn Nairn and typically occurs in late July. The convention is the only one of its kind held in New York as of 2025, though it was preceded by Anthrocon, which started in Albany and has since migrated to Pittsburgh.

== History ==
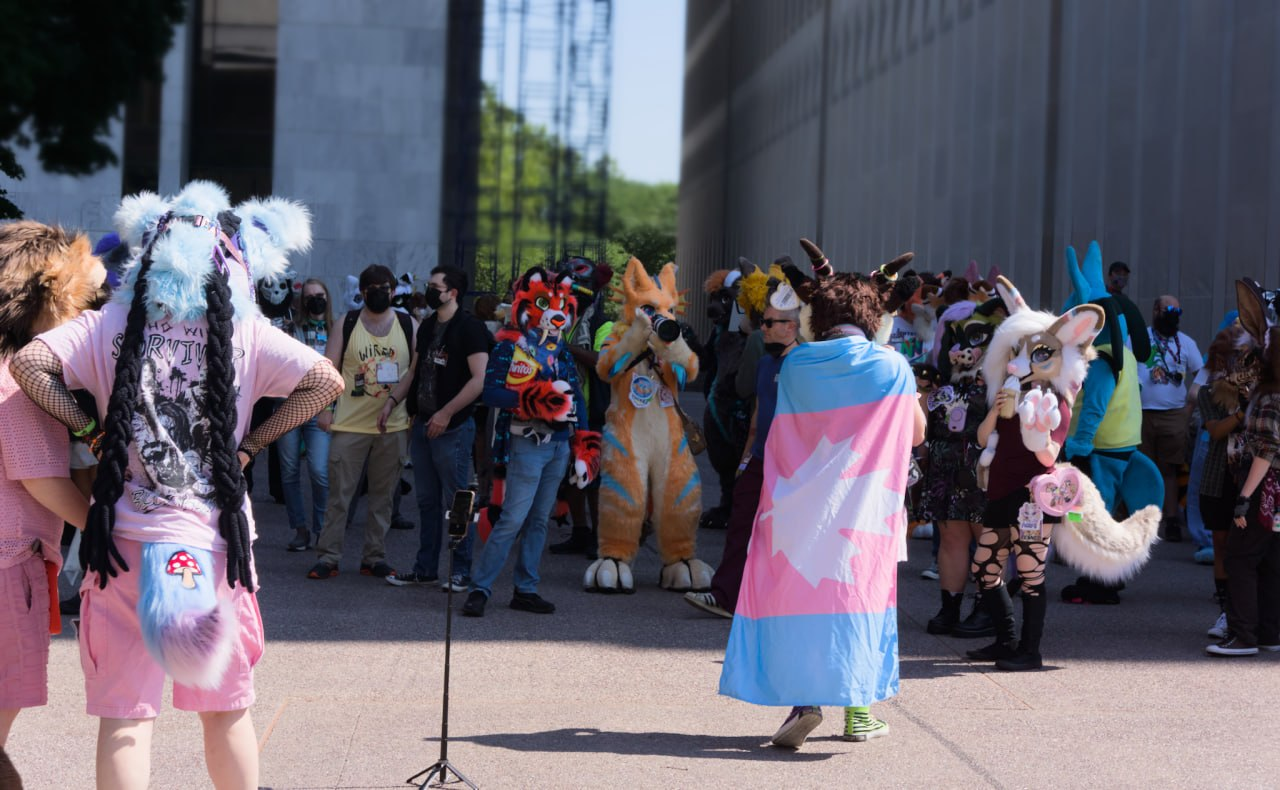
A group of fursuiters near The Egg during Eufuria 2026

The convention originated at Cafe Euphoria, an LGBTQ-friendly hybrid art gallery, restaurant, thrift store and coworking space in Troy, New York. Co-owner Riley Lynn Nairn was diagnosed with stage four colorectal cancer in 2023 and immediately started making plans to host a furry festival at the cafe. (Note: As of 2025, Nairn was listed as the Board Chair of SCREE Inc., the nonprofit organization that manages Eufuria.) The first year of the convention, there were 65 attendees.

Following the success of the convention's first event, Nairn established a nonprofit organization to manage the festival, known as the Society of Capital Region Events and Entertainment (SCREE), Inc. The convention moved to the Albany Capital Center, where in 2024 roughly 430 furries attended. In 2025, with the theme of "solarpunk", Eufuria reported 764 attendees. The convention's third year had the theme of "The Black Pawrade", referencing the 2006 My Chemical Romance song "Welcome to the Black Parade", and reported 1,191 attendees.

== Organization ==
Eufuria is unusual among furry conventions in its practice of requiring all attendees to wear at least a surgical mask at all times to prevent the spread of disease. Besides this requirement, many other activities at Eufuria are familiar to other furry conventions, such as workshops and panels based on furry and non-furry interests, ranging from financial advice to information on 3D modeling. Room is set aside for vendors of furry merchandise. While the convention restricts attendance to those above 18 years of age and materials are provided by the New York State Department of Health to facilitate safe sex, the majority of Eufuria's programming is not explicit.

== Charity ==
Eufuria raises money for charitable organizations that it says are "concentrated on 'human problems'"; in 2024, it raised $1,700 for the American Foundation for Suicide Prevention. In both 2025 and 2026, the convention raised money for Prism Counseling and Advocacy, a non-profit based in Albany that provides support services for the LGBTQ community. The con raised $4,459 in 2025, and $4,800 in 2026.
