= Anthro New England =

Furry convention

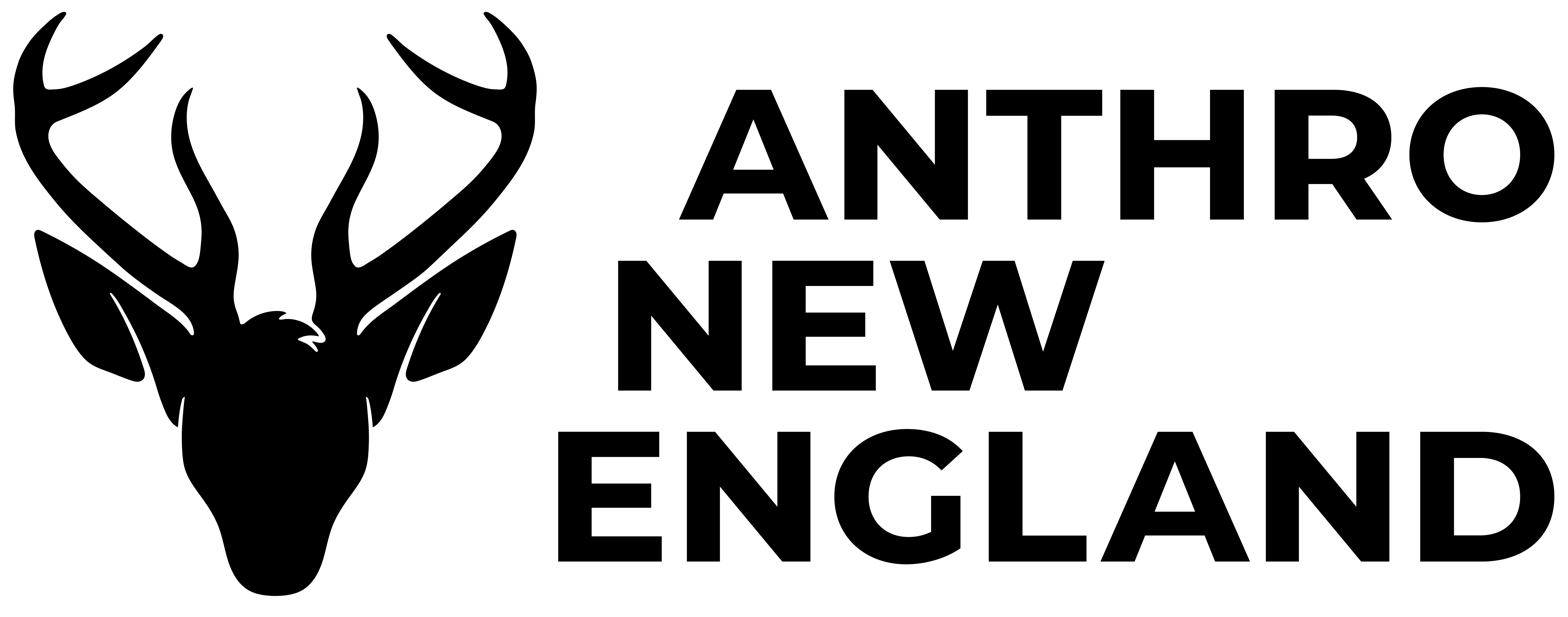
- Status: Active
- Genre: Furry
- Venue: Westin Boston Seaport District Omni Boston at the Seaport
- Locations: Boston, Massachusetts
- Country: United States
- Inaugurated: 2015
- Most recent: 2026
- Attendance: ▲7,284 in 2026
- Organizer: Anthro New England, Inc.
- Filing status: 501(c)(7)
- Website: anthronewengland.com

Anthro New England (ANE) is an annual furry convention held in Boston, Massachusetts. The convention attracts thousands of attendees each year, reaching the latest record attendance of 7,284 in 2026. The event is currently held in the Seaport District of the city of Boston between two hotels, the Westin Boston Seaport District and the Omni Boston at the Seaport.

Funds raised by the convention are directed toward the selected charity each year. Since 2020, Anthro New England has maintained a three-year rotation cycle for these beneficiaries, which generally consist of an animal focused charity and an LGBTQ+ focused charity.

== History ==
Anthro New England was organized in 2014 with the goal of hosting a furry convention in Greater Boston. The inaugural event was held in 2015 at the Hyatt Regency Cambridge in Cambridge, Massachusetts with an initial attendance of 757 people. During the first convention, 165 people took part in the fursuit parade.

As the convention grew, it relocated to the Boston Park Plaza in 2018. By that time, ANE had become one of the largest furry conventions in the United States, reaching an attendance of 2,050.

Following the return to in-person gatherings, Anthro New England has seen rapid year-over-year growth in attendance. From 2022 to 2026, attendance has increased by over one thousand each year, solidifying its position among the top ten largest furry conventions globally. To accommodate this growth, the convention relocated to the Westin Boston Seaport District hotel in 2023, and later added additional overflow hotels in 2024.

In April 2026, following a record-breaking year, Anthro New England announced an agreement to expand the conventions footprint for 2027, utilizing both the Westin and the Omni Boston at the Seaport hotel for additional guestrooms and event space.

== Locations, attendances, charity donations, and themes by year ==
Year	Location	Attendance	Charity donation	Charity	Theme
2015	Hyatt Regency Cambridge, Cambridge, Massachusetts	757	$10,000	Massachusetts Vest-a-Dog	The American Revolution: Boston Strong!
2016	Hyatt Regency Cambridge, Cambridge, Massachusetts	965	$11,000	Massachusetts Vest-a-Dog	Sportsball!
2017	Hyatt Regency Cambridge, Cambridge, Massachusetts	1,384	$15,000	Massachusetts Vest-a-Dog	For Science!
2018	Hilton Boston Park Plaza, Boston, Massachusetts	2,050	$21,000	Massachusetts Vest-a-Dog	To the Sea!
2019	Hilton Boston Park Plaza, Boston, Massachusetts	2,251	$22,500	Massachusetts Vest-a-Dog	Attack of the Were-Con!
2020	Hilton Boston Park Plaza, Boston, Massachusetts	2,570	$25,700	ALS Foundation, NEADS Service Dogs	The Roaring Twenties!
2021	In-person event cancelled due to the COVID-19 pandemic.				ANE: Online!
2022	Hilton Boston Park Plaza, Boston, Massachusetts	2,530	$27,000	NEADS Service Dogs, Youth on Fire	Back to the 90's!
2023	Westin Boston Seaport District, Boston, Massachusetts	3,548	$21,000	NEADS Service Dogs, Youth on Fire	Trains!
2024	Westin Boston Seaport District, Boston, Massachusetts	4,482	$30,000	Youth on Fire, Wings of the Dawn	It's a Nor'Eastah!
2025	Westin Boston Seaport District, Boston, Massachusetts	5,761	$40,000	Wings of the Dawn, Queer Scouts	A Staggering Case!
2026	Westin Boston Seaport District, Boston, Massachusetts	7,284	$50,000	Wings of the Dawn, Queer Scouts	It's a Western!
2027	Westin Boston Seaport District & Omni Boston at the Seaport, Boston, Massachusetts	TBA	TBA	Connecticut Draft Horse Rescue, Queer Scouts	Sleepytime!
