= Animal costume =

Animal costume may refer to:

- Costumed character, mascot costumes that are often based on various animals
- Creature suit, realistic animal costumes often used for film and theater
- Fursuit, usually anthropomorphic animal costumes owned by some members of the furry fandom
- Ritual masks of many indigenous peoples that are shaped like animals
