= Furry convention =

Formal gathering of members of the furry fandom

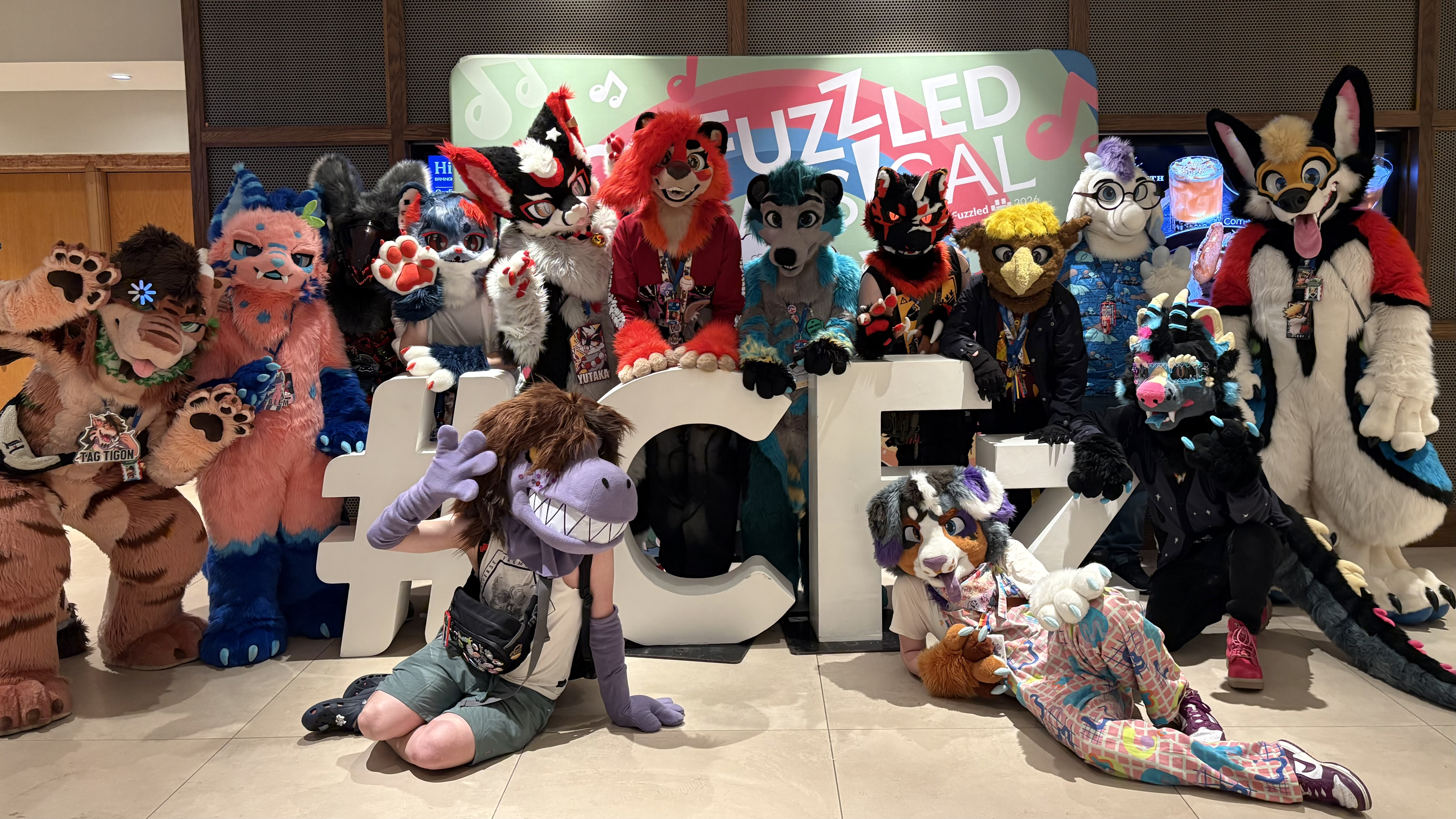
A group of furries at ConFuzzled, a furry convention held in Birmingham, United Kingdom

A furry convention (also furry con or fur con) is a formal gathering of members of the furry fandom – people who are interested in the concept of fictional non-human animal characters with human characteristics. These conventions provide a place for fans to meet, exchange ideas, transact business and engage in entertainment and recreation centered on this concept. Originating in California during the mid-1980s, as of 2016 there are over 50 furry conventions worldwide each year.

Furry conventions offer a range of volunteer-led programming, usually focusing on anthropomorphic art, crafts, music and literature. Many raise money for charity. Attendees often dress up in fursuits and wear artistic name badges for identification, though the majority do not. They may also spend money on the work of amateur and professional artists, both directly and at auction.

== History ==
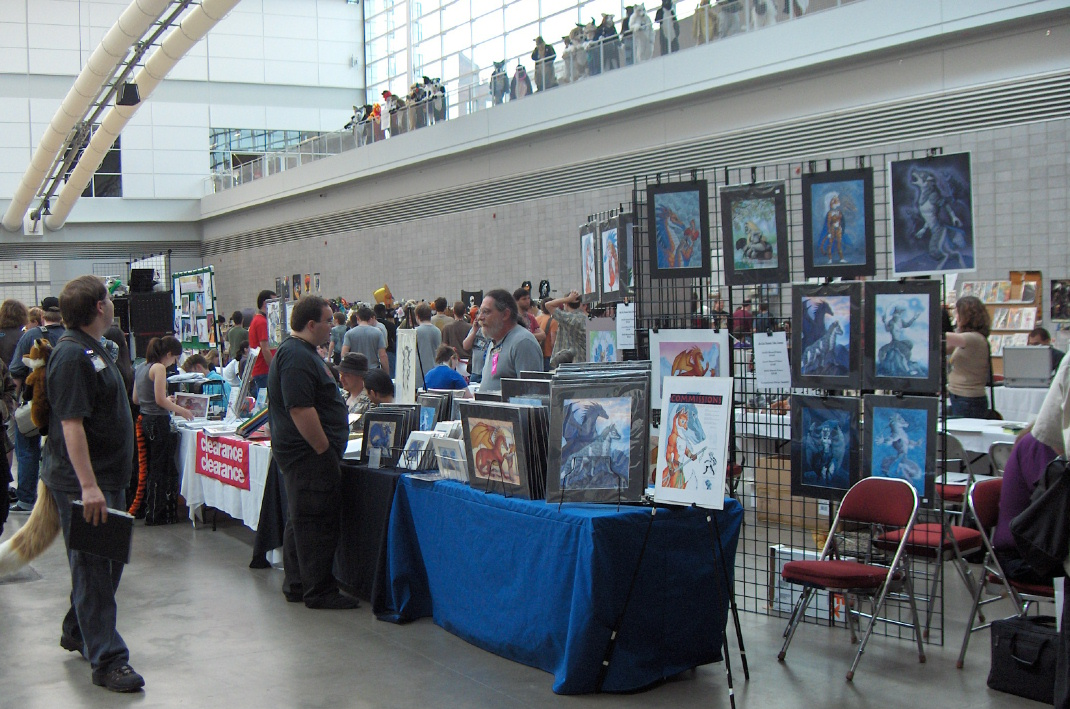
The Dealers Den and fursuit parade at Anthrocon 2006

Furry conventions started in mid-1986 with parties at popular science fiction conventions, such as Westercon and BayCon in the San Francisco Bay Area. Over time, these parties split off into conventions of their own, starting with ConFurence 0 in 1989. Attendance at furry conventions has grown since the 1990s, with the largest convention, Midwest FurFest, reporting over 10,000 attendees in 2022.

Furry conventions sometimes start out as furmeets, where groups of local fans meet at a regular location, often on a scheduled basis. As the local community grows, these groups may put on events that attract dealer attention or significant fan activity and which become recognized as fully-fledged conventions. Other conventions spring up in the wake of discontinued events; for example, Califur was founded in 2004 following the final ConFurence in 2003, in order to keep a furry convention in the Los Angeles Basin.

In Europe, furry conventions originated in 1995 with Eurofurence, which was intended to be held in a different country each year. Difficulties in finding suitable venues within the short time period needed to organize the con led to most of the events taking place in Germany, with a few exceptions. By Eurofurence 9, the problems with hosting a furry convention in a different country every year became obvious, with the planned location of a sports camp in the Czech Republic having numerous issues. Many furry communities began hosting their own conventions in their home countries across Europe from this point onwards; though Eurofurence remains the largest in Europe, over 50 different conventions are held across the continent as of 2025.

== Activities ==
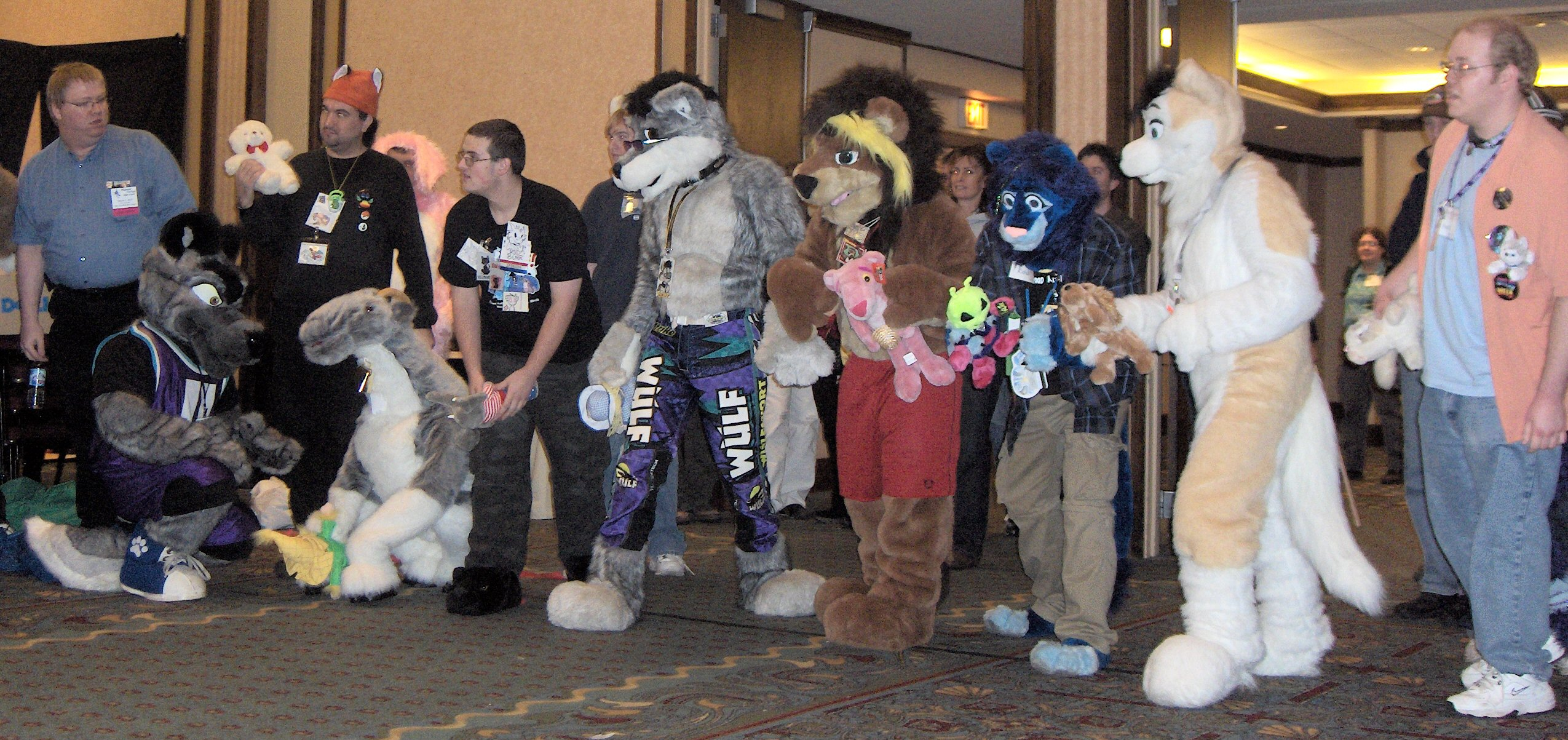
Furry fans prepare for a race at Midwest FurFest 2006.

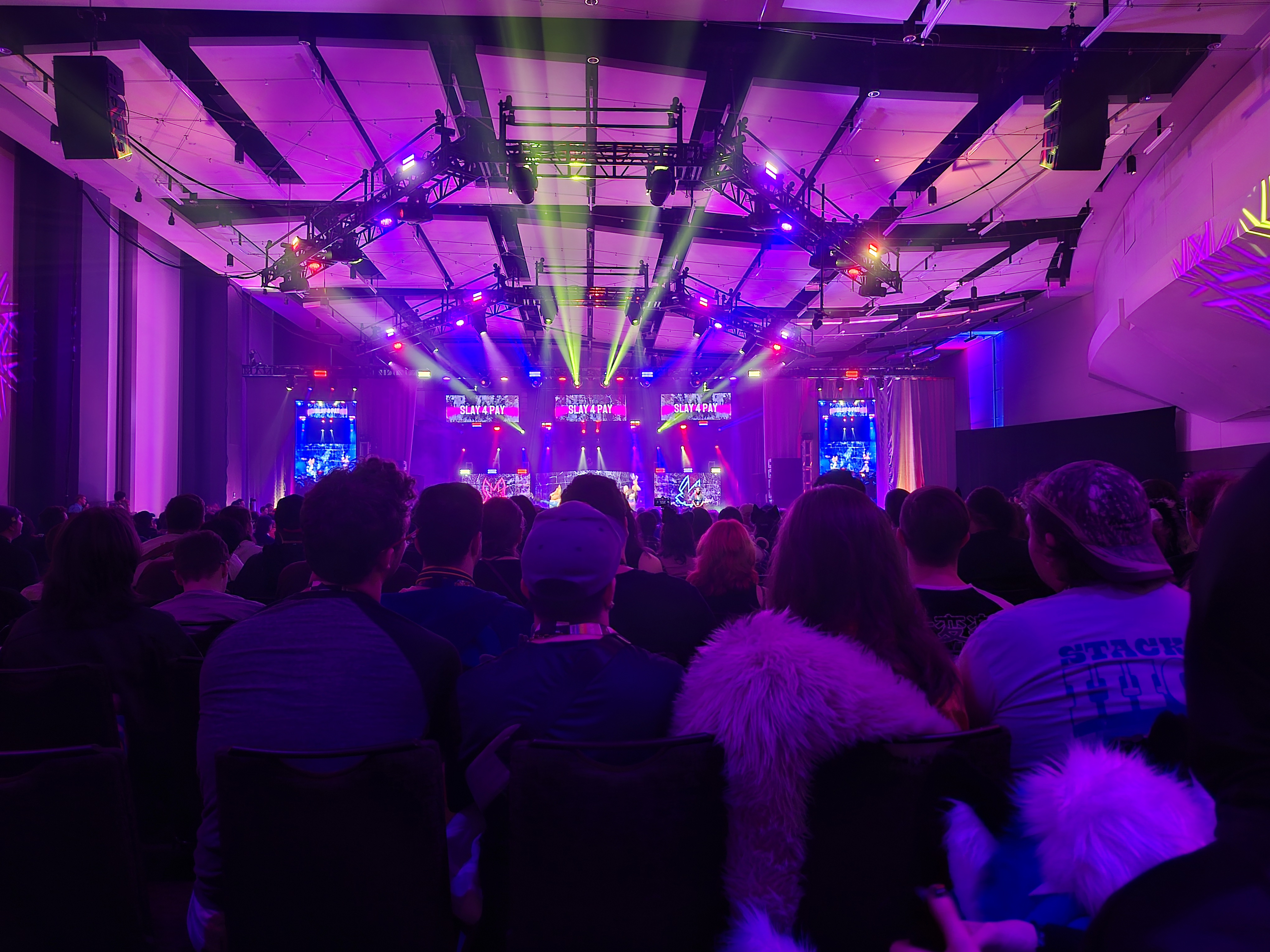
A dance competition at Furry Weekend Atlanta in 2025

Convention programming includes presentations, panels, workshops and tutorials on anthropomorphic culture, from literature, fiction and art to science, technology and spirituality. The convention will often provide space for stand-up comedy routines by entertainers like Uncle Kage and Alkali Bismuth; filk music, many kinds of gaming, and roleplaying sessions, as well as numerous puppeteering and performing arts events. A unifying theme is common for larger events.

Most conventions will feature some kind of an art show, in which artists' work is displayed, often for direct purchase or auction during the convention. There will often be a "Dealers' Den", where art and comic book distributors and other merchants can sell their wares for a fee, and an Artists' Alley where individual artists are given space for no fee or a token fee, usually on the condition that they sell only their own work. Artists may also trade art between each other using sketchbooks. Erotic art is typically allowed if kept separate from other pieces, and shown only to adult attendees. Furry conventions are usually for all ages, but some, such as Eufuria or Las Vegas Fur Con, are strictly for those above 18 or 21 years of age.

Major conventions tend to have a rave on at least one evening. Often, there is a "fursuit-friendly" dance prior to the main event, with raised lighting and slower music to offset fursuiters' reduced vision and mobility. The use of glowsticks and illuminated poi are popular once the lights are dimmed. A furry convention is also an opportunity to socialize, and private parties for subgroups of the fandom are common.

Conventions with significant numbers of fursuiters may offer an event known as the furry games, furry races, or critterlympics. These focus on feats of dexterity suited to multiple players in teams, such as dragging a sled filled with plush toys or other fursuiters around a marked track, or racing back and forth while tethered to one another with a hula hoop.

Some conventions have established charity auctions, which (in the US) usually raise several thousand dollars for the convention's yearly charity, typically a wildlife refuge, nature reserve, animal shelter, sanctuary or rescue group. Organizers may also donate from the convention's own funds. In total, furry conventions raised over US$50,000 for charity in 2006, with Further Confusion and Anthrocon raising over US$60,000 throughout their history.

== Attendees ==
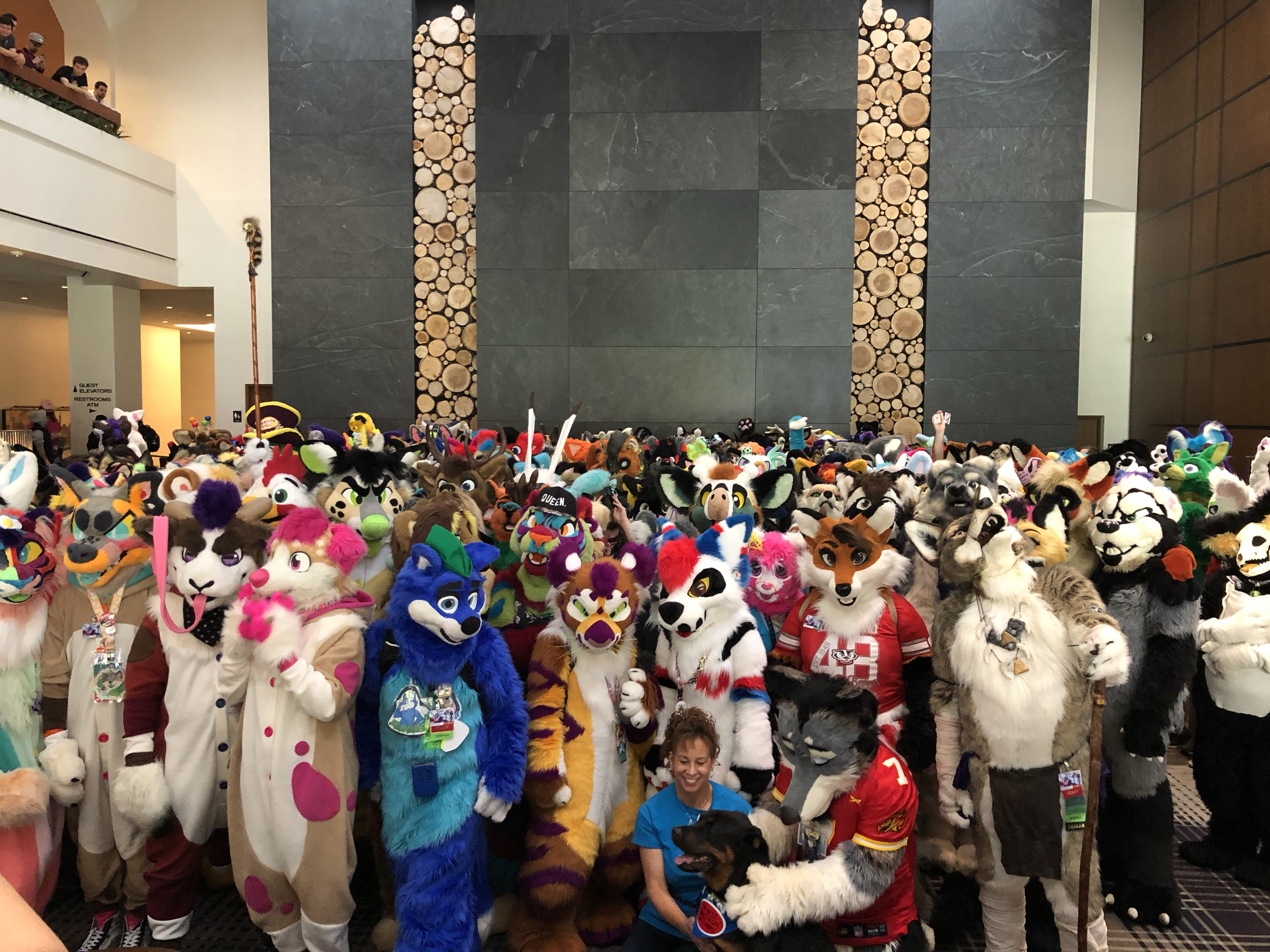
The Furry Migration Furry Convention was held in Minneapolis, Minnesota from September 7–9, 2018. Attendance was 1,107.

Furry convention paraphernalia. From left, clockwise - event convention badge with affiliation ribbons, personal convention badge, event badge, convention books, pocket schedules

Attendees include artists and dealers offering products and services for sale to fans, and those who wish to buy them. Others come for the programming, or to meet friends or other furry fans in general. Many attend for all of these reasons. Some later publish a con report detailing their experiences.

Attendees of major conventions receive a bag with the convention book (or conbook), a lavishly illustrated volume featuring themed artwork, fiction and articles submitted by members and the guests of honor, along with a description of the event's programming, staff, rules, guests and any charity being supported by the convention. Local restaurant information and a combination pocket schedule and map may also be included. Sponsors often receive additional items such as T-shirts, pins or ribbons, as well as faster registration badge pick-up and on-site meals (some conventions provide a con suite with basic refreshments for all members). They may also be displayed prominently in convention publications.

Fans may wear a full or partial fursuit or another costume to express their identity and entertain others, though typically less than 15% of attendees bring a costume, and few of these wear them all the time. Others may wear accessories such as ears or a tail, particularly outside the main convention area. Nearly all will wear one or more custom convention badges featuring a depiction of their fursona, some with attached ribbons providing an indicator of social status, such as a notice of affiliation, or sponsorship of the convention. Sales of such accessories form a part of the commerce at furry conventions.

== Organization and staffing ==
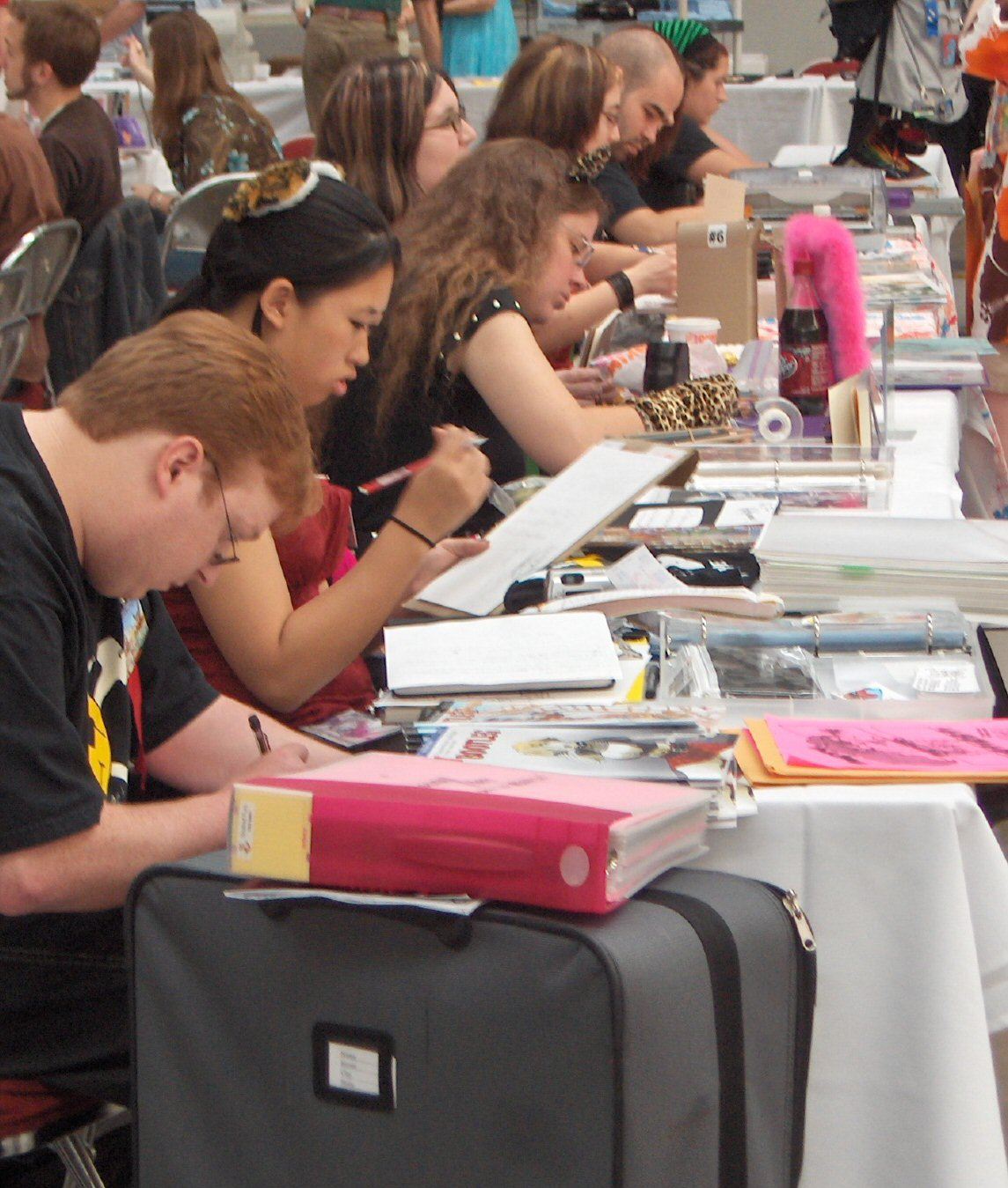
Artists Alley at Anthrocon 2006

Furry conventions are usually run and staffed by volunteers, though venues may require certain activities to be contracted out. Event funding typically relies on convention registrations. Many of the larger conventions are incorporated as non-profit organizations, usually to achieve tax-exempt status and safeguard the organizers' personal assets - in the US, some are 501(c)(3) charities, while others are registered as recreational clubs. The largest events may require up to a hundred volunteers, not including gofers. Volunteers are thanked for their participation during the closing ceremonies, which are usually well-attended, and often receive T-shirts or other benefits.

== Timing and duration ==
Most furry conventions take place over a weekend, with events scheduled between Friday evening and Sunday afternoon. Saturday is typically the busiest day, as most fans must return home on Sunday. One-day passes are sometimes sold at a reduced price.

Reasons for this include:

- Most fans would have to take a vacation from work or study to attend an event held during the workweek.
- Transportation costs are often lower for weekend travelers.
- Hotels have few business travelers during the weekend, making it much easier to reserve a block of rooms and secure space for programming at a reduced price.
- Many fans are students and have little discretionary income, so hotel and convention fees are important factors.

As a given convention expands in growth over the years, increased demand for programming often results in events scheduled late into the night. Convention activities may also be extended to Thursday and early Friday for early arrivals. Unofficial activities are frequently coordinated by groups of people on Sunday evening and Monday morning, usually open to anyone who wishes to join, and may include bowling, bar hopping, visits to arcades, shopping malls, theme parks, zoos, dinner or morning brunch.

== Media and public perception ==
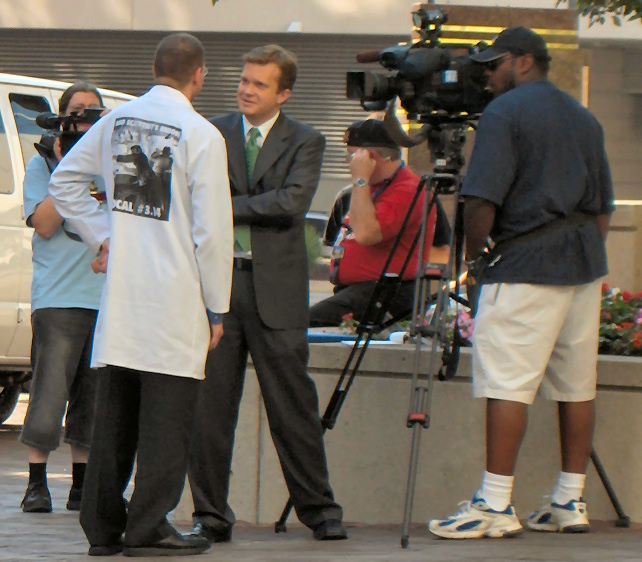
Samuel Conway talks to KDKA-TV reporters outside Anthrocon 2006.

One public misconception, popularized by the CSI episode "Fur and Loathing", is that furry conventions are places for people to dress up as animals and perform sexual acts with each other. In an article about furries, Vanity Fair described some hotel guests as "stunned", with some calling convention-goers "freaks", "blatant homosexuals", and various derogatory terms. Some U.S. Army personnel present during the same convention described attendees as "a little unusual" and "people that have problems", while others considered the event "something nice to bring kids to."

In 2014, Midwest FurFest was disrupted by a chlorine gas attack which left 19 attendees hospitalized. The investigation by Rosemont Police revealed that the attack was most likely an intentional act of crime against the furry fandom. There was a notable suspect who had their home raided and was questioned by the FBI multiple times following the attack, but they were not charged. The perpetrator was never identified and the case remains cold as of 2024.

In May 2024, a true crime podcast series hosted by journalist Nicky Woolf, Fur & Loathing, (Note: Not to be confused with the aforementioned CSI episode of the same name.) was released about Woolf's investigations into the 2014 Midwest FurFest attack and attempts to uncover the identity of the attacker. Woolf interviewed the witnesses of the attack and the suspects that were interviewed by the police.

== Events ==
=== Active events ===
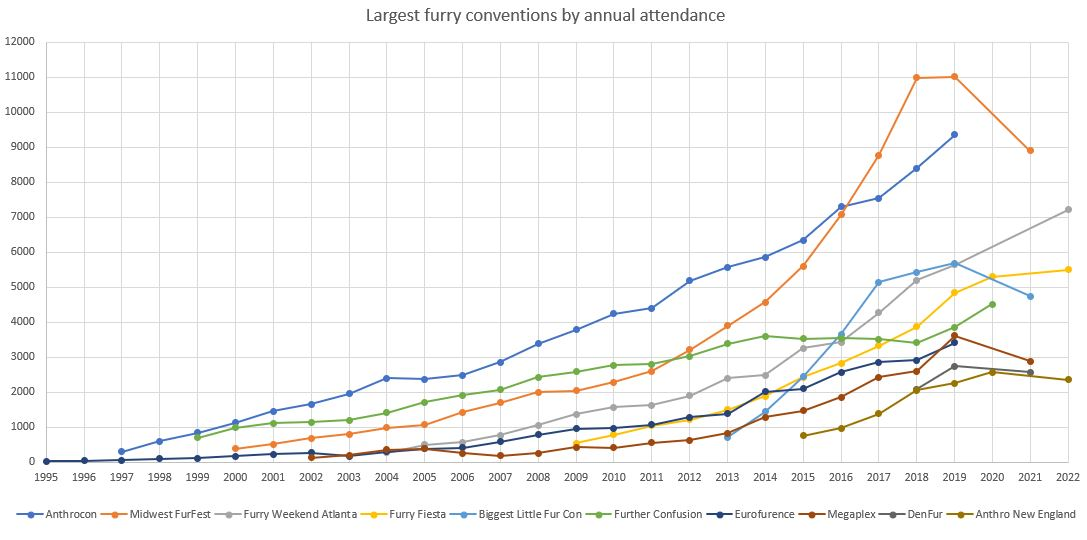
The ten largest conventions by attendance from their first to 2022

Next/Last held	Name	Place
15–18 January 2026	Anthro New England	Boston, Massachusetts, United States
	Founded in 2015 in Cambridge, Massachusetts, originally at the Hyatt Regency Cambridge, it currently takes place at the Westin Boston Seaport Hotel. Anthro New England became the 9th largest furry convention in 2018, with 2,050 attendees.	
2–5 July 2026	Anthrocon	Pittsburgh, Pennsylvania, United States
	Founded in 1997 in Albany, New York and moved to Philadelphia two years later. It currently takes place at the David L. Lawrence Convention Center in Pittsburgh, where it has been every year since 2006, and is the second-largest furry convention to-date behind Midwest Furfest, with over 7,000 attendees annually since 2016.	
13–16 October 2026	Biggest Little Fur Con	Reno, Nevada, United States
	Founded in 2013, hosted at the Grand Sierra Resort. Currently the 3rd most attended furry convention behind Anthrocon and Midwest Furfest, drawing over 5,000 attendees in 2017.	
July 31–2 August 2026	CanFURence	Ottawa, Ontario, Canada
	First held in late 2016 as a spiritual successor to Ottawa's previous furry convention, C-ACE, in 2007. It is the second largest furry convention in the Ontario province, after Furnal Equinox in Toronto, drawing over 568 attendees in 2019.	
23–25 July 2026	Eufuria	Albany, New York, United States
	A convention hosted since 2023 in New York's Capital region, first in Troy, then in Albany proper from 2024 onwards.	
19–23 August 2026	Eurofurence	Hamburg, Germany
	Founded in 1995, this European convention has been held in Germany for seventeen of its twenty years, the latter of which making the furry convention the longest-running active convention. Other hosted countries are Sweden, the Netherlands, and the Czech Republic. Managed by Eurofurence e.V., Eurofurence 23 drew over 2,500 attendees.	
6–9 August 2026	Furrydelphia	King of Prussia, Pennsylvania, United States
	Founded in 2017 in the Philadelphia area. It was held at Valley Forge Casino Resort until 2022, when the convention moved to the Sheraton Philadelphia Downtown.	
17–19 April 2026	FurDU (Furry Down Under)	Surfers Paradise, Queensland, Australia
	Currently the largest furry convention in Australia, the convention is known for its beach culture due to being only metres from the shore. Since 2013 the convention has been held at the Mantra on View, attendance reached capacity in 2019 with 850 attendees.	
26–29 March 2026	Texas Furry Fiesta	Dallas, Texas, United States
	One of two furry conventions in the Texas area. In its inaugural year, the convention sponsored the Center for Animal Research and Education (CARE). 2017's event drew over 3,000 attendees and raised over $25,000 for CARE.	
11–13 September 2026	Furry Migration	Minneapolis, Minnesota, United States
	Founded in 2013 and first held in 2014 at the Ramada Minneapolis Airport Hotel. It is currently held at the Hyatt Regency Minneapolis.	
7–10 May 2026	Furry Weekend Atlanta	Atlanta, Georgia, United States
	Furry Weekend Atlanta has united furries from around the world since 2004. It is one of the largest furry conventions, drawing just over 1,500 attendees in 2011.	
15-19 January 2026	Further Confusion	San Jose, California, United States
	Further Confusion is an annual 5-day furry convention. Started in 1999, it was built to be the bay area's flagship furry event. The 2020 event hosted 4,509 attendees and raised nearly $20,500 for the Billy DeFrank Center of Silicon Valley.	
21–23 August 2026	Megaplex	Orlando, Florida, United States
	Megaplex is an annual 3-day furry convention regularly held at the Hyatt Regency in Orlando, Florida since 2023. Inaugurated in 2002 as "Pawpet Megaplex", it is the only furry convention held in the Sunshine State, drawing over 4,000 attendees and raising over $70,000 for charity in 2022.	
30 August–1 September 2024	Mephit Furmeet	Olive Branch, Mississippi, United States
	One of the few furry conventions in the Southern United States. Occurring on Labor Day weekend in the greater Memphis area, this convention sponsors Tiger Haven as its convention charity. 2010 marked the first year that Mephit Furmeet was held in Olive Branch, Mississippi, a suburb of Memphis.	
5–8 December 2024	Midwest FurFest	Rosemont, Illinois, United States
	A yearly convention in the Chicago metro area which started in 2000 as a spinoff of Duckon, a Chicago-based science fiction convention. In 2019, Midwest Furfest had a reported 11,019 attendees.	
5–7 April 2024	Motor City Furry Con	Ypsilanti, Michigan, United States
	Founded in 2013 in Metro Detroit after the discontinuation of another convention in the area, Furry Connection North. The convention attracts more than 1,000 furries to Detroit and has raised over US$45,000 for Pets for Vets since its inaugural convention in 2014. In 2017, Pets for Vets ambassador Cheryl Wassus took her 1-year old dog to the convention in misunderstanding, an experience her son shared on Twitter.	
TBA 2024	Super Furry Fusion	Shanghai, China
	First held in 2018 with nearly 2,500 attendees, Super Furry Fusion is a semiannual furry convention held in Shanghai every summer and winter.	
7–10 March 2024	VancouFur	Vancouver, BC, Canada
	VancouFur has been Vancouver's furry convention since 2012. It had its sixth furry convention on Canada's west coast in 2017, having raised over $3,000 for the local charity Orphaned Wildlife Rehabilitation Society. The 2016 event was known for sharing the Executive Hotel with Syrian refugees.	

=== Discontinued events ===
Last held	Name	Place
19–21 May 2017	Califur	Pomona, California, United States
	Founded in 2004, Califur is the furry convention successor to the first furry convention Confurence held in 1989. With 1,393 attendees in 2017, Califur was the largest furry convention in Southern California. Located on the same grounds in Los Angeles as the Los Angeles County Fairplex, Califur has had many musical attendees at the convention from Los Angeles radio station KROQ's lineup for Weenie Roast which happens at the same time of year. Following harassment and security threats to the Fairplex, the convention was cancelled in 2018 and has not been held since.	
25–27 April 2003	ConFurence	Burbank, California, United States
	The first exclusive furry convention since 1989, ConFurence was cancelled after holding its 15th edition in 2003. Chairman Darrel L. Exline said he could not continue to organize the event, as it took too much time, money, and energy and resulted in lost friendships.	
23–25 February 2018	Confurgence	Melbourne, Australia
	Formed in 1999 as MiDFur and renamed as Confurgence in 2014, Confurgence is a furry convention which takes place in Melbourne. Since being cancelled in 2019, the convention is officially on hiatus.	
24–27 September 2015	RainFurrest	Hilton Seattle Airport and Conference Center, United States
	Created to replace Conifur Northwest, Rainfurrest was particularly notable for multiple repeated incidents and managerial failures.	

== See also ==
- Brony convention
