= RainFurrest =

Defunct furry convention

- RainFurrest 2016 logo
- Status: Defunct
- Genre: Furry
- Frequency: Annually
- Location: Seattle, Washington
- Inaugurated: 2007
- Most recent: 2015
- Organiser: RainFurrest Anthropomorphics International
- Website: rainfurrest.org

RainFurrest was an annual furry convention held in the Pacific Northwest region of the United States from 2007 to 2015. Following incidents at the 2015 convention, its host hotel terminated its contract with convention organizers. The planned 2016 convention was canceled after organizers were unable to secure a suitable alternative venue.

== History ==
RainFurrest began in 2007 as a replacement for the defunct Conifur Northwest. Attendance grew from 370 in its first year to 2,704 in 2015. In 2013, RainFurrest became the fifth furry convention to exceed 2,000 attendees. Its organizing committee incorporated as RainFurrest Anthropomorphics International (RAIn); which expanded to operate other conventions in the Pacific Northwest, including Portland-based Furlandia and Seattle-based RustyCon. In January 2016, RAIn qualified as a 501(c)(3) organization effective February 2013.

Charitiable fundraising by RainFurrest included support for the Cougar Mountain Zoo.

=== 2015 incidents and cancellation ===
In an post-convention letter to attendees, convention organizers reported hotel property damage, guest hospitalizations, and numerous calls to police. They stated that, in preceding years, the host hotel had sustained more damage during RainFurrest than during all other events combined, and RainFurrest 2015 was no exception. The A.V. Club later reported arrests of convention attendees on charges of assault, sexual assault, and drug possession.

In October 2015, convention organizers revealed the Hilton had terminated its contract to host RainFurrest 2016, and the search for a new venue began. Venues as far away as Portland, Spokane and Boise were considered, in addition to larger event spaces in the Seattle area. However, distance from Seattle, anxiety over an unfamiliar venue, and a shortened planning period decreased the 2016 convention's viability. On February 5, 2016, RainFurrest 2016 was cancelled. The organizers, and the RAIn board of directors, shifted their focus to Furlandia and other projects.

In August 2016, RainFurrest and RAIn co-founder Gene Armstrong told the Seattle Metropolitan he remained interested in reviving the convention. Fred Patten detailed the convention's history and its cancellation in his 2017 book Furry Fandom Conventions, 1989–2015.

== Locations and attendance by year ==
The following table lists the convention's dates, venues, themes, charitable donations, attendance, and fursuit parade participation.

Year	Dates	Venue	Theme	Charity and amount raised	Attendance	Fursuit parade participants
2007	August 24–26	Holiday Inn Seattle-Sea-Tac Airport Hotel	The Rainforest	The Sarvey Wildlife Center (almost $1,000)	370	41
2008	September 26–28	Seattle Airport Marriott	Flight	The Ferret Rescue Society ($1,000+)	599	89
2009	September 18–20	Seattle Airport Marriott	Zombie Attack	Critter Care Wildlife Society ($536.78)	905	159
2010	September 24–26	Seattle Airport Marriott	Furst on the Moon	Northwest Wildlife Rehabilitation Center ($3,000+)	1,045	184
2011	September 22–25	Hilton Seattle Airport and Conference Center	Furry Camping	Love a Mutt Pet Rescue ($4,000+)	1,420	378
2012	September 27–30	Hilton Seattle Airport and Conference Center	Warehouse Furteen	Rabbit Meadows Sanctuary and Adoption Center ($2,500+)	1,705	517
2013	September 26–29	Hilton Seattle Airport and Conference Center	Dancing in the Moonlight	The Clouded Leopard Project ($6,454.17)	2,202	487
2014	September 25–28	Hilton Seattle Airport and Conference Center	Cyberpunk: Fur Meets Chrome	Cougar Mountain Zoological Park ($7,000)	2,586	504
2015	September 24–27	Hilton Seattle Airport and Conference Center	Swords and Sorcery	Cougar Mountain Zoological Park ($10,000+)	2,704	492
