= Further Confusion =

Annual furry convention

Coordinates: 37°19′43″N 121°53′20″W

- Status: Active
- Genre: Furry
- Venue: San Jose McEnery Convention Center
- Location: San Jose, California
- Country: United States
- Inaugurated: 1999
- Most recent: 2026
- Attendance: 6,499 in 2025
- Organizer: Anthropomorphic Arts and Education, Inc.
- Filing status: 501(c)(3)
- Website: furtherconfusion.org

Further Confusion, or Furcon, is an annual furry convention held in San Jose, California, in January, celebrating the anthropomorphics genre or furry fandom, including charitable benefits, educational seminars, art shows, panels and general social activities. It was the first event sponsored by Anthropomorphic Arts and Education (Furcon is its registered service mark) and continues to be its largest.

Beginning in 1999 with the attendance of 691 individuals, Further Confusion has grown rapidly. In 2023, its record attendance was 5,388 individuals from around the world. Further Confusion donated over $100,000 to various charitable beneficiaries (including animal shelters, rescue groups, and the Comic Book Legal Defense Fund) in the period 1999–2008. Its art show sales routinely exceed $50,000.

== Guests of honor ==
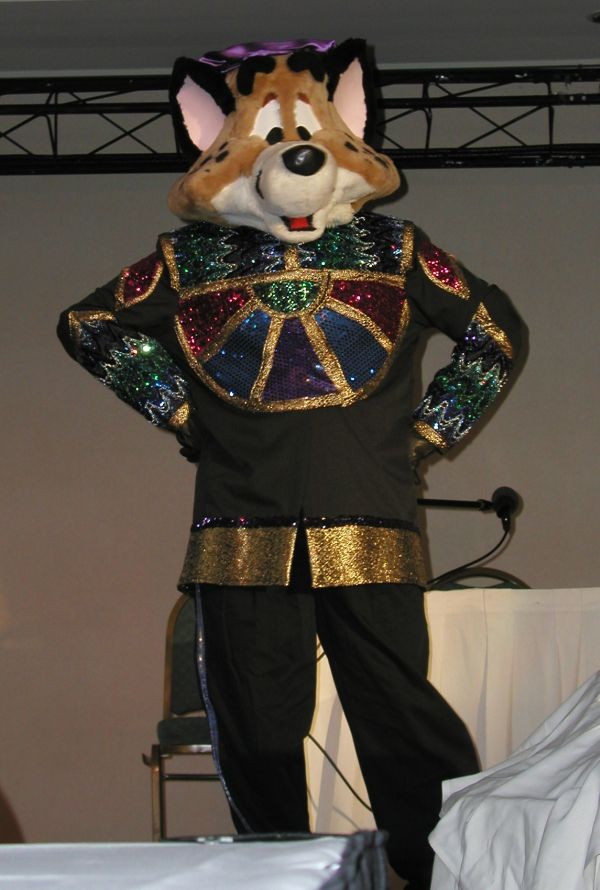
A fursuiter hosts the Iron Artist competition at Further Confusion 2002.

Until 2017, Further Confusion invited significant artists, writers, or other creative workers as guests of honor. The guests of honor were:

- Ed Kline, Ken Mitchroney and Michael H. Payne (1999)
- C. J. Cherryh, Shawn Keller, John Nunnemacher, Karen Prell, Mike Quinn and Jane Fancher (2000)
- Diane Duane, Christina Hanson, Peter Morwood, Felorin and Talzhemir (2001)
- David Brin and Kevin Palivec (2002)
- Karen Anderson and Toby Bluth (2003)
- Heather Alexander, Grant Freckelton and Larry Niven (2004)
- Alan Dean Foster and Walter Crane (2005)
- Eric Elliott and Jane Lindskold (2006)
- Baron Engel and Jerry Pournelle (2007)
- David Alan Barclay, Rodney Haley, and Alexander James Adams (2008)
- Jeff Pidgeon, Anita Coulter and Clare Bell (2009).
- Michael Fry, T. Lewis, and Ursula Vernon (2010)
- Blotch (artist) (2011)
- E. E. Knight and Matthew Ebel (2012)
- Ursula Vernon and Chris Savino (2013)
- Mandi Tremblay (2014)
- Andy Heath, Warrick Brownlow-Pike and Lex Rudd (2015)
- Dana Simpson, fursuit maker Syber, and artists: Fox Amoore and Pepper Coyote (2016)
