= Fursuit =

Costume worn by members of the furry fandom

A large group of fursuit owners (fursuiters) at a meet-up in 2026

Fursuits are custom-made anthropomorphic animal costumes owned and worn by cosplayers and members of the furry fandom, commonly known as "furries"; a furry who wears a fursuit is called a fursuiter. The term is believed to have been coined in 1993 by Robert King. Unlike mascot suits, which are usually affiliated with a team or organization, fursuits most commonly represent an original character created by their wearer, and are often better-fitting and more intricately crafted, with features such as a moving jaw. Fursuits are made in a wide range of styles, from cartoonish to highly realistic.

== History ==
An early fursuit worn by former Disney mascot wearer Robert Hill, based on the feminine character "Hilda the Bambioid", appeared at the first ever furry convention, ConFurence 0, in 1989, but most furries of the time simply wore ears and tails, influenced by their intersection with the anime and sci-fi fandoms. Fursuits did not become widely known until the mid-1990s and the rise of the Internet, which led to the spread of ideas on costume making.

Most early fursuit making was done by the suit's owner using guides released by members of the community, with one of the most prominent being Critter Costuming, a 2004 manual by Adam Riggs. However, by the mid-2000s, the demand for high-quality fursuits was high enough that fursuit making became a viable business. Furries began to commission specialized makers with their custom designs or open-ended requests. Including used suits, the industry now sells millions of dollars' worth of suits each year, and organizations such as sports teams are increasingly commissioning custom-made fursuits for their mascots.

According to Forbes, as of 2018, a few fursuit makers have gained a larger audience by making mascots for mainstream organizations.

== Construction ==
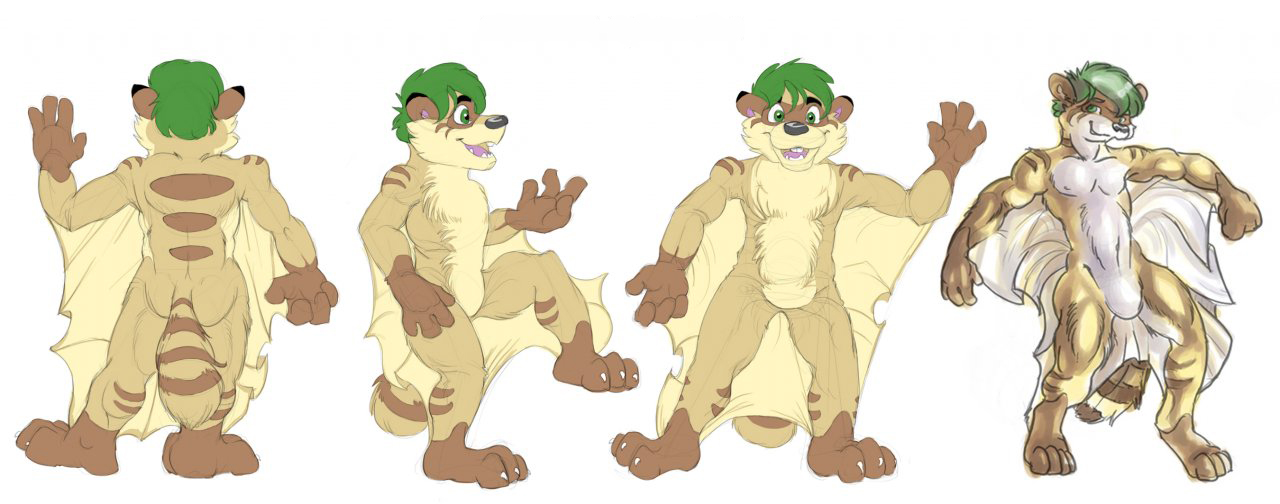
A fursona reference sheet used as part of the design and build process for constructing a fursuit

Fursuits originated due to the dissatisfaction with the quality of mass-produced mascot costumes. Fursuit making is a growing industry, with new costume makers who handcraft custom suits entering the market every week. A few dozen of these makers are highly respected and command prices up to $4,500 or more for a full suit, while there are several hundred more who charge less, usually between $600 and $1,000. Some of these, however, are "fly-by-night" operations or make suits of sub-par quality, leading to the proliferation of fursuit review sites to weed them out. There is heavy turnover of these smaller makers, with only a third of them able to stay afloat, due to suit-making being labor-intensive, and requiring a unique style and a following. People also sometimes make fursuits from scratch as a hobby without opening a business themselves.

To have a fursuit fit correctly, many fursuit makers want a "duct tape dummy" to be made, which will measure and represent the wearer's body during the construction process. Fursuits are often made with faux fur that may be sourced from places like the Los Angeles Fashion District. A single suit can take more than 200 hours of work and sell for thousands of dollars.

Fursuits can be expensive to clean, although many modern-day suits are machine-washable.

== Types ==
A partial fursuit incorporating regular clothing alongside a full-body fursuit.

Besides the typical full-body suit, the partial suit, where the suit's body is substituted by normal clothing, is a popular variation. Three-quarter suits only include part of the body, like the torso or legs, appearing similarly to a talking animal character. Quadsuits are one of the most challenging and expensive types of costumes to make, and involve the wearer walking on all fours with arm extensions to create the illusion of a real animal. A plush suit is a suit that is made to look like a stuffed animal/plushie. There are also fursuits made of other materials, such as spandex or latex.

Fursuits can range from cartoon-styled to hyper-realistic. The most popular animals for fursuits to be based on are dogs, wolves, and big cats. They may also be based on fictional animal hybrids. Some suits may include integrated technology, such as LED lights and programmed expressive eyes.

== In culture ==
Fursuits are heavily associated with the furry fandom by the general public, despite the fact that only about 15 percent of furries own a fursuit, mainly due to their cost being prohibitively high.

They may also be seen as overtly sexualized due to negative coverage from shows like CSI, though this is typically not the case. According to a 2019 study, only 8.8% of furries had a fetish for fursuits. Researcher Courtney Plante stated in 2015 the vast majority of furries "don't want to hear about sex in fursuits, and while they might not reject you, they don't want to know."

Furries who own a fursuit often base them on a "fursona", an anthropomorphic character that represents themselves. Dedicated fursuiters may own as many as a dozen suits based on different characters. Despite being stereotyped as "basement dwellers" still living at home with their parents by many outside the subculture, many members of the furry fandom aspire to be society's highest earners, in part to afford expensive fursuits and associated furry art.

Fursuits are usually worn to furry conventions such as Midwest FurFest and Anthrocon. Some fursuits of existing characters are made for the purposes of cosplay and are worn to anime or gaming conventions. They are also worn in public, though this often requires a spotter or handler to ensure the safety of the performer from things like rowdy people, exhaustion or accidents due to limited vision. A 2019 survey of fursuit owners reported that wearing a fursuit is an infrequent activity, with most wearing them less than once per month.

Esports champion SonicFox became notable in the gaming community for participating in and winning fighting game tournaments while wearing a partial fursuit of their fursona created by fursuit maker Yamishizen.

== See also ==
- Creature suit – Type of realistic costumes
- Costumed character – Meetable or cartoon costumed performers
- Cosplay – Type of performance art
