= Samuel Conway =

American chemist and furry fandom personality (born 1965)

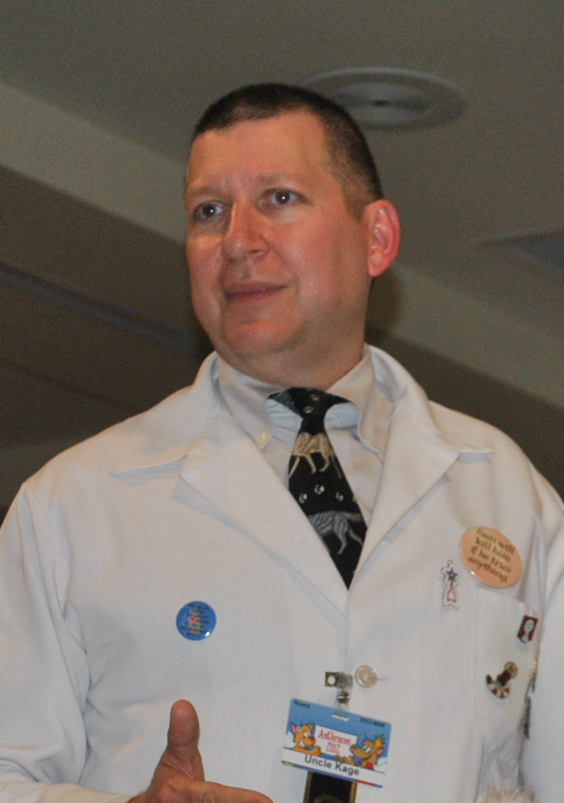
- Conway at Anthrocon in 2012
- Born: Samuel Charles Conway; June 4, 1965 (age 61); Bryn Mawr, Pennsylvania, U.S.
- Other name: Uncle Kage
- Education: Ursinus College (BS); Dartmouth College (PhD)
- Scientific career
- Fields: Organic chemistry
- Workplaces: Food and Drug Administration
- Thesis: The Attempted Generation of Indolyne
- Doctoral advisor: Gordon W. Gribble

Samuel Charles Conway (born June 4, 1965) is an American researcher in the pharmaceutical, biomedical and agrochemical fields of organic chemistry. He holds a Ph.D. in chemistry from Dartmouth College. Aside from his scientific career, Conway is known for his activities in the furry fandom, having served since 1999 as chairman and chief organizer of Anthrocon, one of the largest furry conventions in the world. He is a published author, and has acted as a volunteer emergency coordinator, entertainer, and auctioneer.

== Academic and scientific activities ==
A graduate of Ursinus College, Pennsylvania in 1986, Conway subsequently studied at the Burke Chemical Laboratories of Dartmouth College, New Hampshire, where he obtained his Ph.D. in 1991. His thesis concerned the attempted generation of indolyne (an aromatic compound related to indole).

After college, Conway took a postdoctoral appointment in Chicago, later working as a contractor for the Food and Drug Administration, a researcher for Bionetics, a medicinal chemist for Avid Therapeutics (March 1995 – August 1997) and researcher for Message Pharmaceuticals (August 1997 – April 1999). He spent two years in organ distribution at the National Disease Research Interchange, and was subsequently employed by crop protection company Cerexagri as a regulatory chemist from May 2001 to June 2007, when he became a principal chemist for West Pharmaceutical Services. As of July 2013, he was working for a group near Raleigh, North Carolina.

Conway has authored eleven professional publications and two patents. One patent covers compounds intended to treat hepatitis B in synergy with lamivudine; another relates to recyclable packaging material. His work has been published in Heterocycles, Synthetic Communications, Organic Preparations and Procedures International, Water Research, Rapid Communications in Mass Spectrometry, Antimicrobial Agents and Chemotherapy, Bioorganic & Medicinal Chemistry Letters and Current Organic Chemistry.

== Fandom activities ==
Conway was introduced to the furry fandom at Noreascon 3 (the 1989 Worldcon), and has been involved in fan activities from the early 1990s to the present day.

=== Convention chairman ===
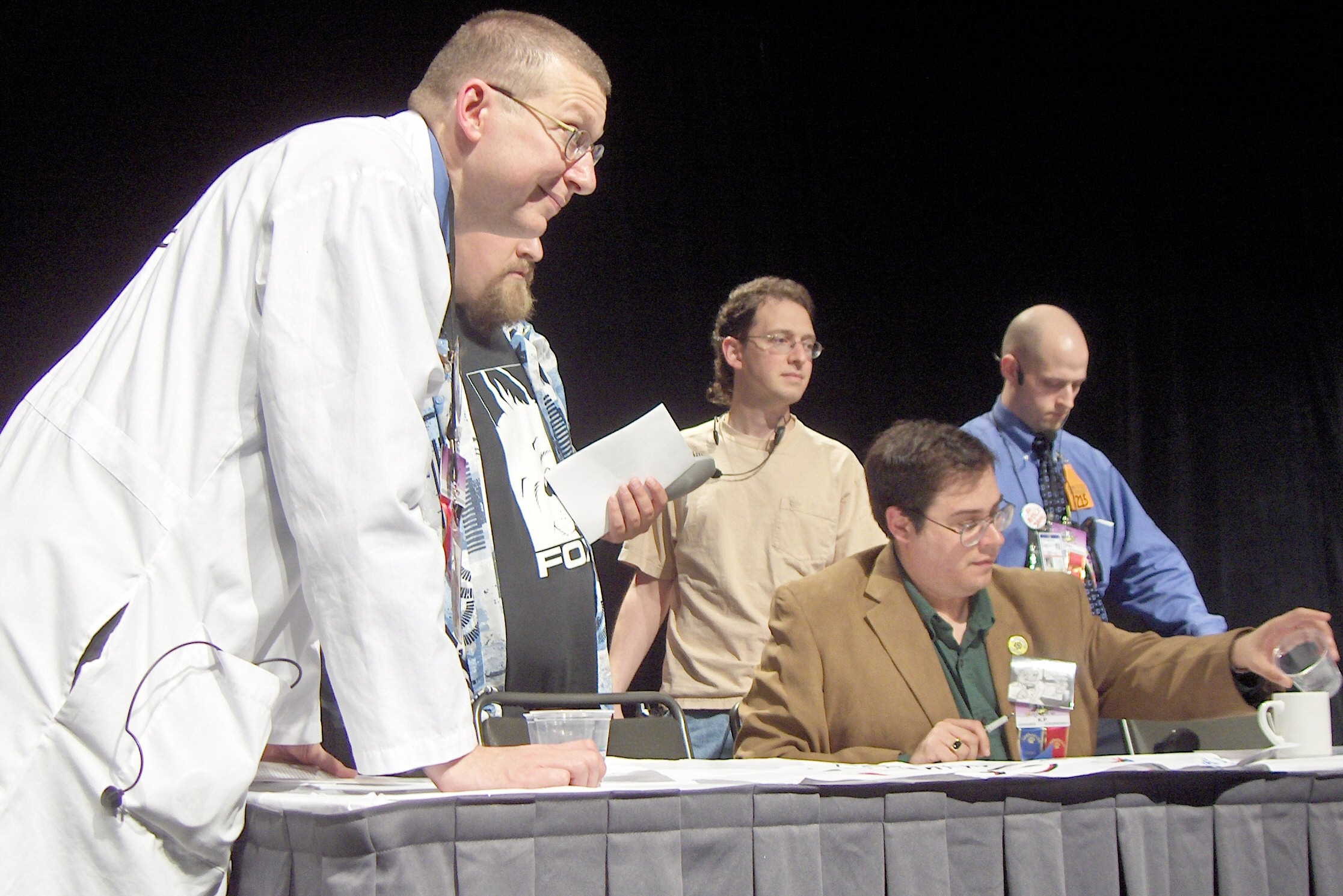
Conway with Anthrocon staff, 2007

Conway became the chairman of Anthrocon in 1999, after his invitation as a guest of honor in 1998. Under his leadership, Anthrocon was incorporated and moved to Philadelphia. The convention's attendance grew from 842 to 2,489 over the period from 1999 to 2006, necessitating a further move to Pittsburgh; 3,390 attended in 2008. Conway is the public face of Anthrocon, responsible for public relations, negotiating hotel contracts, managing finances, damage control and other activities before, during and after the convention. He also talks to fans about presenting furry fandom to the public.

==== Media dealings ====
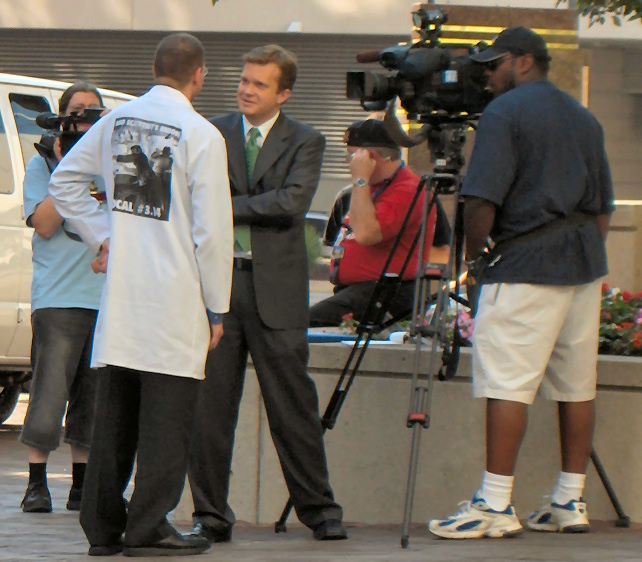
Conway talks to KDKA-TV reporters outside Anthrocon 2006.

Conway dissuades members of the fandom, and Anthrocon membership in particular, from responding to the mass media and news media, due in part to sensationalist coverage like the 2001 Vanity Fair article in which he was quoted. In 2003 he said his standard response to the media was: "Anthrocon is a private event held on private property. Its membership is not interested in being the subject of your documentary."

However, Conway relaxed this stance with Anthrocon's move to Pittsburgh in 2006. While no television, magazine or tabloid representatives were present, several newspapers were invited to attend, and did, including the Pittsburgh Tribune-Review, the Pittsburgh Post-Gazette, and the Pittsburgh City Paper, which printed both a preview and an extensive review. When local television station KDKA-TV showed up, Conway gave a short television interview outside the convention hotel. In November 2006 he gave a radio interview to Dublin's 98FM. Anthrocon still retains tight control over media access, not only to the convention grounds but to the membership, and has official policy that forbids unmonitored dealings with unauthorized members of the media.

=== Storyteller ===
Conway styles himself "Furrydom's Storyteller", making annual appearances at Anthrocon in what has come to be known as Uncle Kage's Story Hour. The entertainment typically consists of four or five extended personal anecdotes. His stage name resulted from his first storytelling experience at ConFurence in 1994, and derives from his fandom name Kagemushi Goro (Shadow Bug Goro), a reference to Kagemusha.

Conway is regularly invited to tell his stories at other fan conventions, including I-CON, Eurofurence, ConClave, and Camp Feral!. Gross sales from recordings of his Story Hours were over US$2600 in 2004; no profit was realized, as the intention was to increase membership and awareness of Anthrocon.

=== Auctioneer ===
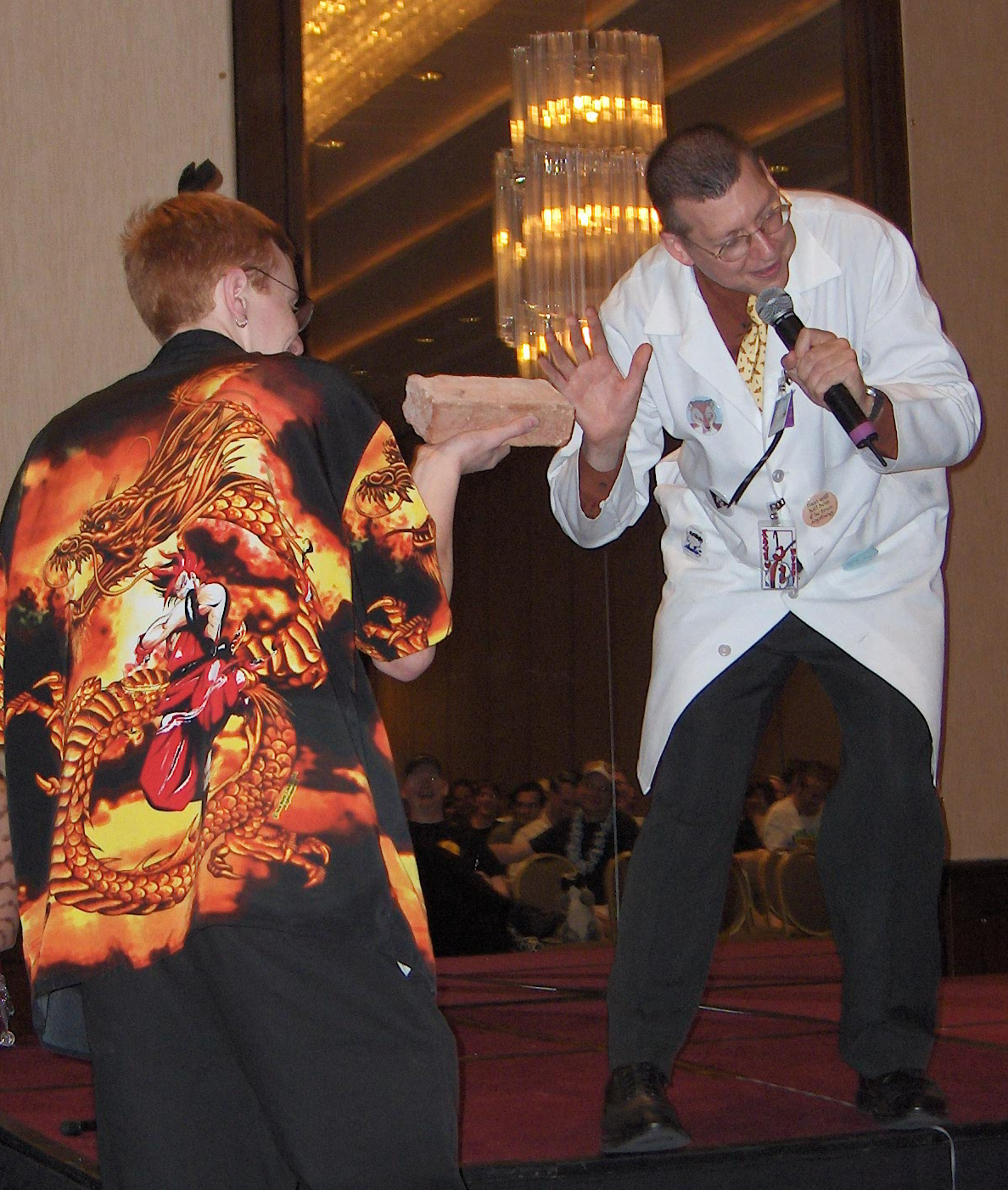
In 2006, Conway auctioned the "last brick" of Anthrocon's old venue (the Adam's Mark Hotel) for US$200.

Conway's first auction was at Albany Anthrocon 1997. Since then, he has presided over auctions which have raised over US$66,000 for a variety of local wildlife charities at Anthrocon alone. He has performed similar services at other fan conventions, including Midwest FurFest. Conway says his techniques are influenced by Phil Foglio and Joe Mayhew; they include humor and appeals to pity, novelty and scarcity.

=== Author ===
While known within the fandom for his spoken storytelling, Conway is also the author of several short stories published in various works by Sofawolf Press.

In May 1998, Conway was invited to write a story based on his interest in birds of prey, particularly the red-tailed hawk. The result was "Tweaked in the Head", published December 1999 in Flights of Fantasy. He next contributed to the first issue of HistoriMorphs, a fanzine mixing historical fiction with interaction between humans and anthropomorphic animals. "The Secret of Wollknäul" took place in Nazi Germany at the end of World War II, and was published in June 2001. He went on to write "The Good Bird of Nanking" and "It Takes A Fox" for subsequent issues of the series.

For Anthrolations #5—a magazine of dramatic fiction—Conway submitted "Six", a previously-written work "based on a true story" involving wildlife rehabilitation from his days as a Red Cross volunteer. The story, illustrated by Synnabar, was nominated for "Best Anthropomorphic Short Story" in the 2002 Ursa Major Awards. Also nominated that year was Breaking the Ice: Stories from New Tibet, a collection set in and around a subarctic mining colony; Conway's contribution, "Dead End", features a bartending vulture who provides an introduction to the harsh, dystopic world.

=== Charity work ===
In 2012, Conway learned that Fernando's, a local restaurant, was going to be closing down due to financial trouble. Fernando's had welcomed Anthrocon guests and furries since Anthrocon moved to Pittsburgh. After putting word out on Twitter and YouTube, over $21,000 was raised in donations to keep the restaurant in business.

== Other activities ==
While in college, Conway was a member of the Ursinius Meistersingers vocal music group, and the performing arts honor society Pi Nu Epsilon. He became a volunteer for the American Red Cross Disaster Service in 1989, but quit in 1998 due to his perception of high-level corruption in the organization. He was an Emergency Management Coordinator while residing in Malvern, Pennsylvania.

In March 1990, Conway became an experimental bone marrow donor for Mark Stevenson, a 4-year-old with Hunter syndrome. The operation was the first of its kind involving an unrelated donor, and was successful; Mark lived to 24. Conway became an active volunteer for the National Marrow Donor Program, claiming to have helped add over 500 entries to their donor registry.

Since May 1996, Conway has participated in the MadSci Network, a free question-and-answer Ask-A-Scientist forum organized by the medical school of Washington University in St. Louis. While most active in the period 1997–2000, he remains a member as of 2009.
