= Orphaned Wildlife Rehabilitation Society =

OWL (Orphaned Wildlife) Rehabilitation Society
- Abbreviation: OWL
- Formation: 1985
- Founded at: 3800-72nd Street, Delta, British Columbia, Canada
- Type: Non-profit organization
- Registration no.: 119075026RR0001
- Legal status: charity
- Purpose: Animal rescue, rehabilitation, welfare, education
- Region served: British Columbia, Canada
- Services: Rescue, treatment and rehabilitation of injured and orphaned birds of prey; public education including school and community groups; on-site education and public tours; wildlife museum; advice and guidance to the public on wildlife issues.
- Staff: 2 full-time, 4 part-time
- Volunteers: 500 + (as of 2024)
- Website: https://www.owlrehab.org

The OWL (Orphaned Wildlife) Rehabilitation Society is a wildlife rescue and raptor rehabilitation centre permitted to care for sick, injured, and orphaned birds of prey which includes eagles, falcons, hawks, ospreys, owls, and vultures. OWL is located in Delta, British Columbia, Canada.

== History ==
OWL was founded in 1984 by Beverly Day in response to growing needs to help with the care and rehabilitation of raptors. Originally operating out of a small home in Surrey, British Columbia, OWL relocated to its current location at 3800-72nd Street in Delta in 1985.

== Activities ==
OWL is dedicated to the rescue, rehabilitation, and release of raptors only. They mitigate and respond to wildlife emergencies including weather events such as heatwaves, cold snaps, and wildfires, often ending up with over seven hundred raptors in care in a year. The birds come from all over the province of British Columbia, with the majority coming from the Lower Mainland. On occasion, birds come from neighbouring provinces and the United States of America requiring different permits. They are transported to OWL by a network of volunteers including trucking companies, airlines, community groups and others.

=== Wildlife hospital ===
OWL's hospital is open 7 days a week, 365 days a year to care for raptors in need. Wildlife rehabilitators and volunteers work together to provide care to the bird patients. Local veterinarians assist, donating care and services when a raptor requires surgery. Since its foundation in 1985, thousands of raptors have been treated by OWL.

=== Wildlife helpline ===
OWL is available 7-days a week, 365-days a year to answer calls from the public with questions regarding raptors in need. During events such as a heat dome, forest fires or cold snaps, phone calls from the public increase dramatically.

=== Education programs and events ===
OWL provides education resources through their onsite and offsite education programs, their virtual education program, their public tours and their social media. OWL provides work experience to high school and veterinary students, and volunteers from various Canadian provinces and other countries.

Every year, OWL hosts an Open House, a two-day event that includes the release of a raptor on each day, and a one-day winter fundraiser, usually in December.

== Notable rescues ==
- OWL volunteers used a volleyball net, a front-end loader, a fire truck and six hundred feet of marine rope to rescue a juvenile bald eagle stuck in a water treatment settling pond in Richmond in 2019.
- In 2020, a northern saw-whet owl surrounded by a thick pile of feathers indicative of a cat attack was picked up by a volunteer for PROWLS north of Powell River. It was flown to OWL in Delta to be treated. After seven weeks of rehabilitation, it was flown back to Powell River by Pacific Coastal Airlines and released back into the wild.
- In 2021, a barn owl being attacked by crows flew into the gap between pallet stacks at Art Knapp in South Surrey. OWL volunteer June Young attended and with the help of an Art Knapp worker using a forklift to move the first layer of pallets, June tried to ease the barn owl backwards. The owl grabbed hold of June's bare arm with its free leg and buried its claws in June's arm. The owl was rescued and taken to OWL and June had to go to the emergency.
- Matt Pistell was driving 25 km north of 100 Mile House in the Interior in British Columbia one dark night in December 2022 when a large owl flew into his windshield. Through the truckers who often assist OWL, the owl was transported to OWL in Delta. She had a concussion, damage to her right eye, and injuries to her left leg. In March 2023, after several months of rehabilitation, she was transported back to the Interior where she was released.
- OWL treated a trio of golden eagles for lead poisoning in 2024. All three were found near Sechelt on the Sunshine Coast. They were lethargic and not flying away. OWL believed the primary suspect of the lead poisoning was from ammunition used in hunting.
- On January 9, 2024, residents of Quesnel noticed an eagle who had been shot. The eagle suffered from lead poisoning and was shipped to OWL for rehabilitation via Bandstra Transportation Systems. On April 11, 2024, the rehabilitated eagle was released at the West Fraser Timber Park in Quesnel where it was reunited with its riverside friend.
- In January 2024, Fort St. James residents Brad Hoy and his wife rescued an injured eagle, braving snowbanks to reach it. The Hoys secured the injured eagle in a dog crate and transported it to OWL. The eagle suffered from lead poisoning and a broken wing. After five months of rehabilitation, the eagle was successfully released back in the Fort St. James community.

== Funding ==
OWL is a not-for-profit charitable society that relies on donations from the public and the support of companies and corporations who provide donations, sponsorships, material, and supplies.
