= Organic Preparations and Procedures International =

- Discipline: Process of synthesis in organic chemistry
- Language: English

Publication details
- Publisher: Organic Preparations and Procedures Inc. (U.S.A)

Standard abbreviations
- ISO 4: Org. Prep. Proced. Int.

Indexing
- ISSN: 0375-9512

Links
- Journal homepage

Organic Preparations and Procedures International is a bimonthly scientific journal focusing on organic chemists engaged in synthesis. Topics include original preparative chemistry in association with the synthesis of organic and organometallic compounds.
