= Midwest FurFest =

Annual furry convention in Illinois, US

- Status: Active
- Genre: Furry
- Venue: Donald E. Stephens Convention Center
- Location: Rosemont, Illinois
- Country: United States
- Inaugurated: 2000
- Most recent: 2025
- Attendance: ▲16,925 in 2025
- Organizer: Midwest Furry Fandom, Inc.
- Filing status: 501(c)(3)
- Website: www.furfest.org

Midwest FurFest (MFF) is a furry convention that takes place in Rosemont, Illinois, usually on the second weekend after Thanksgiving. First held in 2000, MFF is presented by Midwest Furry Fandom Inc, an Illinois educational not-for-profit corporation that exists primarily for the purpose of holding an annual convention to facilitate education in anthropomorphic literature and art. It also facilitates the donation of funds to non-profit institutions, mainly of which promote the well-being of humans and/or animals. The convention is among the most attended furry conventions in history, peaking at 16,925 attendees in 2025.

== Background and history ==
Midwest FurFest started as a furry focused part of the now defunct DucKon, a Chicago-based science fiction convention. The furry portion of the original convention was started at DucKon 3 in 1994 and was headed up by Robert King. Interest grew each year, and it was estimated that by DucKon 8 (1999) between one-quarter and one-third of those present attended due to interest in the furry component of the convention.

Interest in furry specific activities grew to a size that it was no longer feasible to exist as a part of DucKon, and the convention was spun off in 2000, with the creation of Midwest Furry Fandom Inc., with the first MFF happening in November 2000. The convention has grown from 473 attendees in 2000 to 13,641 in 2022, making it the largest furry convention in the world by more than 3,900 attendees over the previous largest convention, Anthrocon. It has helped raise over US$1,400,000 for various charities.

== Incidents and controversies ==
=== 2014 gas attack ===
On December 7, 2014, a gas leak occurred at the Hyatt hotel in Rosemont, where the convention was being held. The hotel was evacuated, and 19 guests were hospitalized. Later, an investigation found a broken glass bottle containing a concentration of chlorine powder inside the building. Eighteen of the nineteen people hospitalized were released soon after and the convention continued. Rosemont Police interviewed hotel guests and employees, as well as employees at local stores which sell chlorine. While these interviews and subsequent investigation did not result in any known suspects or charges, police continue to treat this as a crime.

=== Milo Yiannopoulos ===
On September 15, 2019, far-right political commentator Milo Yiannopoulos announced his intention to attend that year's convention. After significant backlash from other attendees on social media, Yiannopoulos was swiftly banned from the convention the following day.

== Locations, attendances, and charity donations by year ==
Year	Location	Venue	Attendance	Charity Donation	Charity
2000	Arlington Heights, Illinois	Sheraton Chicago Northwest	473	$3,522	Wolf Park, Valley of the Kings big cat sanctuary, and Chicago House
2001	Arlington Heights, Illinois	Sheraton Chicago Northwest	511	$6,800	Animals for Awareness
2002	Schaumburg, Illinois	Hyatt Regency Woodfield	685	$6,088	Animals for Awareness
2003	Schaumburg, Illinois	Hyatt Regency Woodfield	800	$6,500	Animals for Awareness
2004	Schaumburg, Illinois	Hyatt Regency Woodfield	959	$7,000	Furry Friends Foundation
2005	Schaumburg, Illinois	Hyatt Regency Woodfield	1,066	$6,800	Wildlife in Need
2006	Schaumburg, Illinois	Hyatt Regency Woodfield	1,422	$13,049	Safe Haven Wildlife Refuge
2007	Schaumburg, Illinois	Hyatt Regency Woodfield	1,690	$15,193	Flint Creek Wildlife Rehabilitation
2008	Wheeling, Illinois	Westin Chicago North Shore	1,992	$15,000	Rainbow Animal Assisted Therapy
2009	Wheeling, Illinois	Westin Chicago North Shore	2,040	$12,799	Kane Area Rehabilitation and Education for Wildlife
2010	Rosemont, Illinois	Hyatt Regency O'Hare	2,285	$11,300	Castaway Pet Rescue
2011	Rosemont, Illinois	Hyatt Regency O'Hare	2,600	$19,575	Animal Education and Rescue
2012	Rosemont, Illinois	Hyatt Regency O'Hare	3,216	$40,500	Felines & Canines
2013	Rosemont, Illinois	Hyatt Regency O'Hare	3,904	$28,000	One Tail at a Time
2014	Rosemont, Illinois	Hyatt Regency O'Hare	4,571	$31,446	Critter Camp Exotic Pet Sanctuary
2015	Rosemont, Illinois	Hyatt Regency O'Hare	5,606	$62,021	Save-A-Vet
2016	Rosemont, Illinois	Hyatt Regency O'Hare	7,075	$78,482	Felines & Canines
2017	Rosemont, Illinois	Hyatt Regency O'Hare	8,771	$85,000	CRISP
2018	Rosemont, Illinois	Hyatt Regency O'Hare	10,989	$94,000	SitStayRead
2019	Rosemont, Illinois	Donald E. Stephens Convention Center	11,019	$224,704	Felines & Canines
2020	Cancelled due to the COVID-19 pandemic				
2021	Rosemont, Illinois	Donald E. Stephens Convention Center	9,332	$74,303	Mission Companion Paw
2022	Rosemont, Illinois	Donald E. Stephens Convention Center	13,641	$106,683.66	The Street Dog Coalition
2023	Rosemont, Illinois	Donald E. Stephens Convention Center	15,547	$185,758.31	Live Like Roo
2024	Rosemont, Illinois	Donald E. Stephens Convention Center	16,800	$135,945.95	The Street Dog Coalition
2025	Rosemont, Illinois	Donald E. Stephens Convention Center	16,925	$151,517	Mission Compassion Paw
2026	Rosemont, Illinois	Donald E. Stephens Convention Center	TBA	TBA	TBA
