= ConFurence =

First furry convention, held from 1989 to 2003

- Status: Inactive
- Genre: Furry
- Location: California
- Country: United States
- Inaugurated: 1989
- Most recent: 2003
- Website: https://www.confurence.com/

ConFurence was the first exclusively furry convention, held annually in southern California from 1989 to 2003. The large furry presence at the BayCon science fiction conventions instigated Mark Merlino and Rod O'Riley to throw "furry parties" at Westercon, Baycon, and other west coast sci-fi conventions in the late '80s. This led to the test gathering in 1989, ConFurence Zero.

The convention became well known in mainstream media and among the furry fandom for its sexual themes. Samuel Conway commented, “by ConFurence 6 it looked like PrideFest," although Mark Merlino claims nothing special happened at the convention.

== History ==
After trying the Red Lion hotel, Confurence 0 was held at the Holiday Inn Bristol Plaza in Costa Mesa, California, on January 21 to 22, 1989. According to Joe Strike, While attendance for this first serious attempt to create a "funny animal fandom" convention was sparse at 65 persons, it was enough to encourage the Californians to attempt a full-fledged furry convention next year. Attendance was doubled to 130 for the first official ConFurence convention in January 1990, proving them right.

In 1997 Kare 11 reported adult oriented events going on at the convention. At the height of popularity in 1998, ConFurence 9 boasted the then-largest furry convention attendance of 1250.

Control of the ConFurence convention was transferred to Darrel Exline in 1999, who created a new entity called "The ConFurence Group" to run it, but by 2003 attendance had dwindled to 470 due to increased competition from other regional furry conventions and infighting among different factions of anthropomorphic fandom. The final ConFurence gathering gained notoriety when television crew from The Man Show appeared and attempted to interview attendees on camera.

With the demise of ConFurence, Mark Merlino and Robert Johnson Jr. teamed up to establish Califur in 2004 to continue the tradition of a furry convention in Southern California.
