= Anthrocon =

Pittsburgh furry convention

- Anthrocon's official logo
- Status: Active
- Genre: Furry
- Frequency: Annually
- Venue: David L. Lawrence Convention Center; Westin Convention Center Hotel
- Locations: Pittsburgh, Pennsylvania, U.S.
- Country: United States
- Inaugurated: 1997
- Most recent: 2026
- Attendance: ▲20,618 (2026)
- Organizer: Anthrocon, Inc.
- Filing status: 501(c)(7)
- Website: www.anthrocon.org

Anthrocon (abbreviated AC) is an annual furry convention that takes place in Pittsburgh, Pennsylvania, each June or July. It caters to furries, which are fans of fictional anthropomorphic animal characters in art and literature. The convention was first held in 1997 in Albany, New York, and moved multiple times before settling at the David L. Lawrence Convention Center. Since moving to Pittsburgh in 2006, the convention has drawn millions in financing to the local economy.

Anthrocon is among the most attended furry conventions in history, peaking at 20,618 in 2026.

== Background and history ==
Anthrocon was founded in 1997 as Albany Anthrocon (AAC) in New York state, with a membership of about 500. The convention was renamed to 'Anthrocon' and moved to Valley Forge, Pennsylvania, in 1999 and 2000; then to a larger hotel, the Adam's Mark, on the outskirts of Philadelphia in 2001. Attendance grew each year, Anthrocon becoming the largest furry convention in 2001 with an attendance of 1,457. In 2004 it had climbed to 2,404 attendees in its final year at the Adam's Mark.

Due to the unforeseen sale of the Adam's Mark Hotel in November 2004, Anthrocon chose the Wyndham Franklin Plaza in Philadelphia as the site for its 2005 convention. Attendance that year dropped to 2,373. In June 2005, a contract with the Westin Convention Center Hotel in Pittsburgh was signed, and Anthrocon was scheduled to be held at the adjoining David L. Lawrence Convention Center between June 15 and 18, 2006. Despite concerns that the move to Pittsburgh would decrease attendance, it rose to 2,489, enough to ensure the future of the convention in Pittsburgh.

In 2007, Anthrocon was featured in the Guinness World Records (2008 Edition) as the "largest furry fan club" in the world. In 2008, Anthrocon became the first furry convention to have an attendance exceeding 3,000 members, the official count reaching 3,390. In 2009, attendance rose 11% to 3,776, and the Fursuit Parade count jumped to 640—a 41% increase. Anthrocon 2009 brought approximately $3 million to the Pittsburgh economy.

Anthrocon 2010 had an attendance of 4,238, the first furry convention to exceed 4,000 members; and by 2012 saw 5,179 attendees, with a Fursuit Parade exceeding 1,000. The admission price was also set overall at $60 for a four-day pass, though pre-registered attendees paid $50.

In 2017, Anthrocon lost the title of "World's most attended furry convention", as Midwest FurFest in Rosemont, Illinois, claimed the title with an attendance of over 8,700.

The chairman of the convention since 1999, Samuel Conway, oversees the operations of Anthrocon with the assistance of convention staff and volunteers who donate their time and energy throughout the weekend to assist the multitude of small tasks which arise. Since 1997, Anthrocon has raised more than $200,000 for animal-related charities.

The convention has been acknowledged as part of Pittsburgh's culture; since 2014, Pittsburgh Pirates player Andrew McCutchen has been known for making an X (Twitter) post simply containing the word "furries" prior to the convention. A superstition emerged surrounding McCutchen's performance at Pirates home games during Anthrocon, with a statistician noting in 2023 that he had a batting average of .419 and three home runs (one of which being a walk-off in extra innings in 2014) over 15 games. The convention was also referenced in a side plot in a 2026 episode of the medical drama The Pitt, where a fursuiter attending Anthrocon was shown being treated for heat exhaustion.

=== Fernando's Café ===
Since the convention's presence in Pittsburgh, Fernando's Café, a fast food restaurant located near Westin Convention Center Pittsburgh, is one of several restaurants that cater to furries during Anthrocon weekend. However, in 2012, Fernando DeCarvalho, the owner of the restaurant, called Conway informing him that he had gone into debt as a result of the Great Recession. In response, Conway initiated a fundraising campaign which resulted in the restaurant receiving $20,000, a move HuffPost reports would "alleviate some of [DeCarvalho's] debt and allow him to keep his doors open long enough for one last Anthrocon." The cafe has since switched ownership, and names, but still schedules unique offerings.

== Typical programming and events ==
There are areas open most of the day to accommodate sales by Dealers and Artists, as well as an area to congregate and socialize.

Anthrocon provides a number of specialized 'tracks' of programming with similar furry based themes and scheduled 'events'.

The programming tracks involve discussions and work groups focused on the application of furry in Art, Comedy and Improv, Computer Gaming, Costuming (Fursuits), Music, Puppetry, Role-Playing (both gaming and real-life), and Writing.

Scheduled events that take place have included a Charity Auction, Masquerade, Fursuit Parade, nightly dances, Art Show Auctions, and special presentations by Uncle Kage and "2 the Ranting Gryphon".

Every year, the convention has several Guests of Honor, who are prominent individuals who are compensated for their attendance and travel expenses. Past Guests of Honor at Anthrocon have included Rob Paulsen and Mark Evanier.

== Anthrocon by year ==
This table includes the locations of each convention as well as attendance figures, charity donations, convention themes, and guests of honor by year.

Year	Dates	Location	Attendance	Charity Donation	Charity	Theme	Guests of Honor
1997	July 4–6	Albany, New York	500 est	$2,200	Therapy Dogs/K9 Friends	An East Coast Furry Con	artist Daphne Lage; author Watts Martin
1998	July 3–5	Albany, New York	600 est	$3,092	Whiskers	Here Be Dragons	artist Jim Groat; author Jeffrey A. Carver
1999	July 2–4	Valley Forge, Pennsylvania	804	$3,600	Great Valley Nature Center	The Furry Revolution	artist Vicky Wyman; author S. Andrew Swann
2000	June 30 – July 2	Valley Forge, Pennsylvania	1,128	$6,534	The National Greyhound Adoption Program	Furries of Myth and Legend	artist Sara "Caribou" Palmer; author Paul Kidd
2001	July 27–29	Philadelphia	1,457	$7,237	Reins of Life	Furries in Flight	comic-book artist Dan DeCarlo, creator of Josie and the Pussycats; syndicated cartoonist Bill Holbrook
2002	July 11–14	Philadelphia	1,648	$13,280	Canine Partners for Life	Invention	author Lisanne Norman (of The Sholan Series); artist Heather Bruton
2003	July 17–20	Philadelphia	1,949	$8,348	Support Our Shelters	Creatures of the Night	artist Guy Gilchrist; artist Mark E. Rogers
2004	July 8–11	Philadelphia	2,404	$7,200	Forgotten Felines & Fidos (FFF)	Summer Games	artist Stan Sakai (creator of Usagi Yojimbo); artist Michel Gagné
2005	July 7–10	Philadelphia	2,370	$6,470	Greater Philadelphia Search & Rescue	Heroes	Peter Laird (co-creator of Teenage Mutant Ninja Turtles); Timothy Albee (director "Kaze, Ghost Warrior")
2006	June 15–18	Pittsburgh	2,489	$8,407	Western Pennsylvania National Wild Animal	Making History	artist Scott Shaw! (creator of a number of comic book and cartoon characters); Diane Duane (author of several series including So You Want to Be a Wizard)
2007	July 5–8	Pittsburgh	2,849	$7,608	Animal Friends	Looking to the Future	voice actor Rob Paulsen; writer Mark Evanier; artist Carolyn Kelly
2008	June 26–29	Pittsburgh	3,390	$13,154	Pittsburgh Parrot Rescue	It's a jungle out there!	animator and Disney Legend Floyd Norman
2009	July 2–5	Pittsburgh	3,776	$8,993	Animal Rescue League Wildlife Rehabilitation	OMG Aliens!	character developer and artist Joe Harris; Character artist and story designer Ben Balistreri; illustrator and television producer Bob Boyle
2010	June 24–27	Pittsburgh	4,238	$12,849	Fayette Friends of Animals	Modern Stone-Age Furries	author and illustrator James Gurney; puppeteer and director Jim Martin with Gary Gnu from The Great Space Coaster
2011	June 23–26	Pittsburgh	4,400	$11,522	ToonSeum	The Anthropomorphic Institute of Magic	author and illustrator Andy Runton; writer Peter S. Beagle
2012	June 14–17	Pittsburgh	5,179	$20,656	Hello Bully	A Midsummer Night's Dream	Comic Artist, Animator, Director, TV Repairman Mike Kazaleh; Comic Artist and Video Game Art Director Dev Madan of Sly Cooper fame.
2013	July 4–7	Pittsburgh	5,577	$31,255	Equine Angels Rescue	The Fast and the Furrious	writer Mercedes Lackey; illustrator Larry Dixon; animation writer, storyboard artist Tom Minton
2014	July 3–6	Pittsburgh	5,861	$32,372	The National Aviary	Secret Societies	voice actor Lee Tockar; voice actor Jim Cummings
2015	July 9–12	Pittsburgh	6,389	$35,910	The Western PA Humane Society	Viking Invasion!	voice actress Kimlinh Tran; Major League Baseball mascot The San Diego Chicken
2016	June 30 – July 3	Pittsburgh	7,310	$30,880	Pittsburgh Zoo and PPG Aquarium	Roaring Twenty	animator Joaquin Baldwin; Tracy Butler, creator of Lackadaisy; voice actor Trevor Devall
2017	June 29 – July 2	Pittsburgh	7,544	$37,598	Hope Haven Farm Sanctuary	Take Me Out To The Ballgame	voice actor Charlie Adler
2018	July 5–8	Pittsburgh	8,407	$42,051	South Hills Pet Rescue	Movie Monsters	artist Len Simon; writer Ursula Vernon
2019	July 4–7	Pittsburgh	9,358	$46,440	PEARL Parrot Rescue	Surf Pacific	voice actor Ben Diskin; comics creator Steve Gallacci; esports personality SonicFox
2020	Cancelled (originally July 2–5)	—N/a					
2021	Cancelled (originally July 1–4)	—N/a					
2022	June 30 – July 3	Pittsburgh	9,702	$41,553	Wildlife Works Inc.	Aesop's Fables	comic creator Susan Rankin; Animator Kévin "Kéké" Gemin; Acrobat Sardyuon
2023	June 29 – July 2	Pittsburgh	13,644	$52,000+	Rabbit Wranglers	Anthropolis: Our Furry City	Pittsburgh (unspecified)
2024	July 4–7	Pittsburgh	17,639	$100,000+	Gray Paws Sanctuary	AnthroCoaster!	Pittsburgh (unspecified)
2025	July 3–6	Pittsburgh	18,357	$87,267+	Nose to Tail Cat Rescue	Deep Sea Adventures!	none
2026	July 2–5	Pittsburgh	20,618	$74,240+	J and J Farms Animal Sanctuary	Cryptids, Creatures, and Curses!	none
2027	July 1–4	TBA	TBA	TBA	TBA	Level 30: Begin!	TBA
