= Otherkin =

Individuals who identify as not entirely human

An acute heptagram is a common symbol for the otherkin community

Otherkin is a subculture of individuals who identify as partially or entirely nonhuman. An umbrella term for this would be alterhuman. Some otherkin believe their identity derives from non-physical spiritual phenomena, such as having a nonhuman soul or reincarnation. Some otherkin give non-spiritual explanations for themselves, such as unusual psychology or neurodivergence, or as part of dissociative identity disorder or being plural. Many otherkins say they are physically human, but not all.

The otherkin subculture developed primarily as an online community during the 1990s. It had partly grown out of some small groups of people who described themselves as elves during the 1970s and 1980s. Since the late 2000s, the word has come to be treated as an umbrella term for some other nonhuman identity subcultures.

== Etymology ==
The word otherkin, in the context of a subculture, was created in July 1990 by participants of a mailing list made for elves and other mythological creatures. It came along with the variant "otherkind," which appeared first in April 1990. Mailing list participants used both interchangeably for a while. Over the following decades, the word otherkin entered common usage enough to be later added to the principal historical dictionary of the English language. In 2017, the Oxford English Dictionary defined otherkin as "a person who identifies as non-human, typically as being wholly or partially an animal or mythical being."

Coincidentally, the word otherkin also existed in the Middle English language. The Middle English Dictionary (1981) defines the adjective otherkin as "a different or an additional kind of, other kinds of". Additionally, otherkin has appeared in multiple works of fiction as a term unrelated to the subculture.

== Terms and identities ==
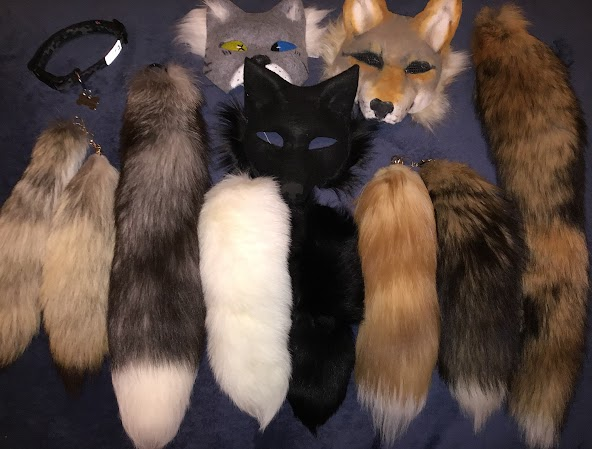
A collection of gear, including masks, tails, and a collar.

The term otherkin includes a broad range of identities. Otherkin may identify as creatures of the natural world, mythology, or popular culture. Examples include but are not limited to aliens, angels, demons, dragons, mermaids, elves, fairies, horses, rabbits, foxes, wolves, cats, dogs, and fictional characters. Rarer are those who identify as plants, machines, concepts, or natural phenomena such as weather systems. The term "transspecies" is used by some.

=== Therianthropy ===
The term therianthrope, commonly called "therian", refers to individuals who identify as a nonhuman animal on any level, whether it be spiritual, psychological, or even physical. This identity is typically considered involuntary and integral to the self. The species a therian identifies as is called a "theriotype". While therians mainly attribute their experiences of therianthropy to spirituality, psychology, or both, the way in which they consider their therianthropy to occur is not a defining characteristic of therianthropy.

=== Terminology ===
Something specific an otherkin identifies as is called a "kintype". A common grammatical construct within the otherkin community is to add the suffix -kin to the end of what they identify as, making it a personal identifier. For example, someone who identifies as a dragon may be called "dragonkin". Someone who strongly identifies with but not as a nonhuman animal or other entity is called "otherhearted". For example, someone who identifies with dogs may be called "doghearted".

== Community ==
Otherkin communities online largely function without formal authority structures and mostly focus on support and information gathering, often dividing into more specific groups based on kintype. There are occasional offline gatherings, but the otherkin network is mostly an online phenomenon.

The therian and vampire subcultures are related to the otherkin community, and are considered part of it by most otherkin but are culturally and historically distinct movements of their own, despite some overlap in membership.^{:13} The word alterhuman exists as an umbrella term which intends to encompass all of these subcultures, as well as others such as plurality.

=== Symbols ===
A regular {7/3} heptagram, known as the "Elven Star" or "Fairy Star"

A common symbol for otherkin is a seven-pointed star, specifically a regular {7/3} heptagram, known as the "Elven Star" or "Fairy Star". Otherkin have used it for decades. One early use of it was by the Silver Elves in an article they published in the summer 1986 issue of Circle Network News.

=== Religious and spiritual beliefs ===
Joseph P. Laycock, assistant professor of religious studies at Texas State University, considers otherkin beliefs to have a religious dimension, but asserts that "the argument that Otherkin identity claims conform to a substantive definition of religion is problematic". Many otherkin themselves reject the notion that being otherkin is a religious belief.

Some otherkin claim to be especially empathic and attuned to nature. Some claim to be able to shift mentally or astrally, meaning that they experience the sense of being in their particular form while not actually changing physically. Moreover, the claim to be able to physically shift is generally looked down on by the community. They may also describe being able to feel phantom limbs/tails/horns that coordinate with their kintype. Some otherkin claim to also go through an 'awakening' that alerts them to their kintype.

Many otherkin believe in the existence of a multitude of parallel universes, and their belief in the existence of supernatural or sapient non-human beings is grounded in that idea.

== History ==
=== 1970s ===
The earliest recorded instance of a group that would be considered otherkin were the Elf Queen's Daughters, a group who considered themselves elves. Arwen and Elenor, also known as "The Tookes" founded the group sometime in the late '60s or early '70s and began publishing letters from their home in Oregon throughout the '70s. Some of these letters would appear in Green Egg magazine, a contemporary neo-pagan publication. By 1977, the Elf Queen's Daughters would stop publishing letters. In 1979, a later group known as The Silver Elves would visit the Elf Queen's Daughters home and live with them for a month.

=== 1990s ===
The first otherkin presence on the Internet was the Elfinkind Digest, a mailing list for "elves and interested observers", created by a student at the University of Kentucky in 1990. In the early 1990s, newsgroups such as alt.horror.werewolves (AHWW) and alt.fan.dragons on Usenet, which were initially created for fans of these creatures in the context of fantasy and horror literature and films, also developed followings of individuals who identified as mythological beings.

=== 2000s ===
On 15 December 2006, the Minneapolis-based newspaper Star Tribune published an article about dragons that included a section about the otherkin blog Draconic. The article took quotes from the mission statement of the blog, written by site founder Chris Dragon.

=== 2010s ===
On 7 April 2010, the Swedish newspaper Dagens Nyheter published an article titled "Ibland får jag lust att yla som en varg" ("Sometimes I get the urge to howl like a wolf") in which Lanina, founder of the Swedish language otherkin and therian forum therian.forumer.com, described the basics of what it is like to be a therian. The article is the first known article to offer a description of "therian" identity by a major European newspaper.

In 2011, the International Anthropomorphic Research Project (IARP), a Canadian-American multidisciplinary research group, expanded the scope of its annual International Furry Survey to include otherkin and therians for the first time.

=== 2020s ===
As TikTok and other social media platforms dramatically increased visibility of otherkin and therian communities in the early 2020s, a litter boxes in public schools hoax spread widely, with claims that public schools were installing litter boxes in bathrooms to be used by students "who identify as cats." Officials have routinely debunked these claims and there is no evidence that any school has ever held such a policy. One Nebraska lawmaker apologized for publicly citing the rumor.

== Research ==
Danielle Kirby published one of the first pieces of academic research on otherkin in 2006, which served to introduce the community to other academics. Kirby described otherkin as sharing ideas with the neopagan movement, however she called this an "interim classification", and warned that "to construe this group as specifically neo-pagan or techno-pagan obscures the focus of the participants". Subsequent research has treated the otherkin community as having an essentially religious or spiritual character.

Starting in 2016, scholars have utilized a narrative identity approach, investigating how otherkin come to understand their experiences. Reviewing prior research, Stephanie C. Shea criticizes the prevailing conception of the otherkin subculture as being, or being alike to, either a religion or a spirituality.

In four surveys of furries (with a sample size of 4338, 1761, 951 and 1065 respectively), depending on the sample, between 25% and 44% responded that they consider themselves to be "less than 100% human", compared to 7% of a sample of 802 non-furries surveyed at furry conventions.

== Public perception and media coverage ==
Perception of individuals who identify as otherkin varies and is subject to individual interpretation. Reactions often range from disbelief to aggressive antagonism, especially online.

Otherkin have been called a religious movement (or a "quasi-religion") that "in some of its forms, largely only exists on the Internet". Although otherkin beliefs deviate from the definition of "religion", many individuals share a primary interest in the paranormal, but many do not.

Joseph P. Laycock argues that the otherkin community serves existential and social functions commonly associated with religion, and regards it as an alternative nomos that sustains alternate ontologies. Professor Jay Johnston feels that nonhuman identity "is perhaps not so much pathological as political".

According to Nick Mamatas, they represent a dissatisfaction with the modern world, and they have taken fairy lore out of its original context.

== See also ==
- Changeling – Creature in European folklore
- Clinical lycanthropy – Delusion of being a non-human animal
- Depersonalization – Anomaly of self-awareness
- Dysphoria – Profound state of unease or dissatisfaction
- A Field Guide to Otherkin – 2007 non-fiction book
- Mermaiding – Swimming dressed in a mermaid costume
- Quadrobics – Form of physical exercise
- Tulpa – Entity manifesting from mental powers
- Walk-in – New Age concept
- Wolf – 2021 Irish-Polish drama film
