= Therian subculture =

Individuals who identify as nonhuman animals

The theta-delta, a symbol of therianthropy since 2003

Therians, also known as therianthropes, are individuals who identify as one or more nonhuman animals, partially or entirely, on a personal level, which they call their theriotypes. Therians are often considered a subset of otherkin. The enduring experience of identifying as a nonhuman animal, as well as the broader lived experience of therians, is commonly referred to as therianthropy.

The modern Western therian community started in 1993 on an internet forum for werewolf fiction. In academic writing, the topic has usually been split between two views: the one of psychiatry, which has linked such cross-species beliefs to mental illness or delusions, and the one of anthropology, which treats them as spiritual phenomena or shamanistic belief systems; more recently, it has also begun to be explored in terms of narrative identity and as a phenomenon to be understood holistically on its own terms rather than fitted neatly into existing categories.

== Etymology ==
The word "therianthropy" originates from the Greek word theríon, which translates to "wild animal" or "beast", and anthrōpos, meaning 'human being'. It was used to refer to animal transformation folklore of China as early as 1901. In 1915, the Japanese publication A History of the Japanese People from the Earliest Times to the End of the Meiji Era used the word "therianthropy" to refer to the spiritual aspect of the transformation of humans into wild animals. In its original definition, it is defined as "combining human and animal form".

From the early 1990s, participants in online communities such as the Usenet group alt.horror.werewolves began using the word "therianthropy" as self‑description, and this community‑specific identity sense became more widespread in the early 2000s.

== Identities ==
Therian identities are diverse and expressed in a wide variety of ways. Therians often identify as one or more animal species that exist in real life, called their theriotype; theriotypes can be extinct or extant species. Those who identify with more than one animal are referred to as "polytherians". The most common species therians identify as are wolves, dogs, foxes, and felids such as panthers or housecats, though can include any animal, such as horses, deer, other mammals, insects, aquatic life, avians, invertebrates, reptiles, and dinosaurs. Some identify not as a specific species, but rather a taxonomic genus or family; this experience is called "cladotherianthropy", after the word clade, and those who experience it are called "cladotherians".

Among its members, therianthropy is seen as a long-standing, internal identity that develops through a gradual process of self-discovery. This identity is typically considered involuntary and integral to the self. Unlike clinical lycanthropy, which is linked to belief in actual physical transformation into an animal, therians consider their identity strictly non-physical.

Therians often describe going through an "awakening" where they first discover and accept their identity. This process is often framed as a form of self-initiation, in which a previously dormant therian comes to recognize their nature. Many report awakening during adolescence or young adulthood, though this can occur at any point in life, including early childhood or later in adulthood.

== Experiences ==
=== Shifts ===
Many therians experience shifts, which refer to a temporary change, commonly in behavior or mindset, that brings them closer to their identified animal. The most commonly discussed forms are "mental shifts", in which a therian's mindset or emotional state is experienced as moving toward that of their theriotype, and "phantom shifts", in which they feel phantom limbs such as ears, tails, wings, muzzles, or other body parts that are not physically present. However, reported shift experiences also include a wide range of other forms beyond these two.

Shifts can occur in a range of situations, from everyday play and relaxation to moments of intense emotion such as fear or anger, and individuals differ in how frequently and intensely they experience them. It is reported that mental shifts may be associated with both positive and negative emotions, including feelings of threat or anger as well as comfort or euphoria when acting in animal-like ways.

=== Species dysphoria ===
Species dysphoria is an informal psychological and non-clinical term used within the therian and otherkin communities to describe self-reported distress associated with the perceived mismatch between one's identity and physical body. It is not a recognized medical or psychiatric diagnosis.

Many therians report distress or dissatisfaction due to the mismatch between their animal identity and human body. In the 2024 study that was a part of a dissertation, 76.4% of participants who did not identify as human reported experiencing species dysphoria, which is consistent with rates from three previously conducted surveys (ranging from 75.1% to 82.3%).

=== Instincts ===
Personal accounts from therians commonly describe various species‑related instincts or urges associated with their theriotype, the origins of which are often reported as difficult to explain in terms of typical human emotions or experiences. These may take different forms and can relate to play, defense, cooperation, display of affection, or predatory impulses (prey drive). Their expression can include nonverbal expressions such as movements, gestures, or postures. They may also involve lifestyle-related needs or preferences, such as sleeping in ways reminiscent of the theriotype, seeking environments natural to the corresponding species, or expressing a desire to move or vocalize in species-typical ways.

== Common activities ==
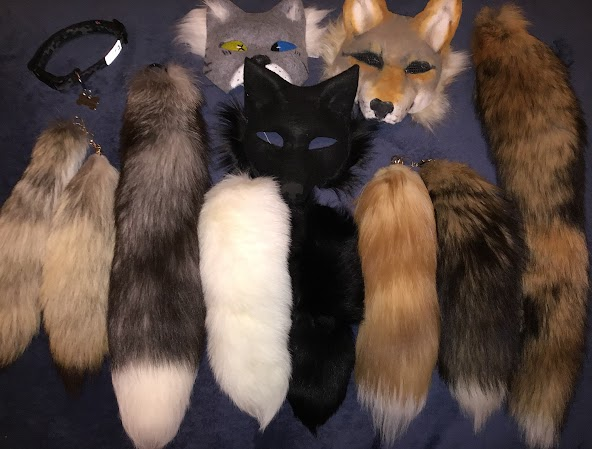
A collection of gear, consisting of masks, taxidermy tails, and a collar

Therians utilize different strategies to connect with the animal they identify as and to express that identity outwardly.

=== Quadrobics ===
Quadrobics is a form of physical exercise and an unofficial sport involving running and jumping on all four limbs. It is a widespread activity among younger therians, mostly those with quadrupedal theriotypes, who often incorporate animal movement imitation and other elements related to their identity into the activity.

=== Gear ===
Wearing animal-themed accessories, the most common of which being masks, tails, and gloves, is a popular form of self-expression (though collars and socks are also known to be used) among therians and otherkins. Wearing gear is not necessary to therianthropy, and therians may not wear it.

=== Howls ===
Therians' in‑person gatherings are commonly referred to as "howls".

== Related groups ==
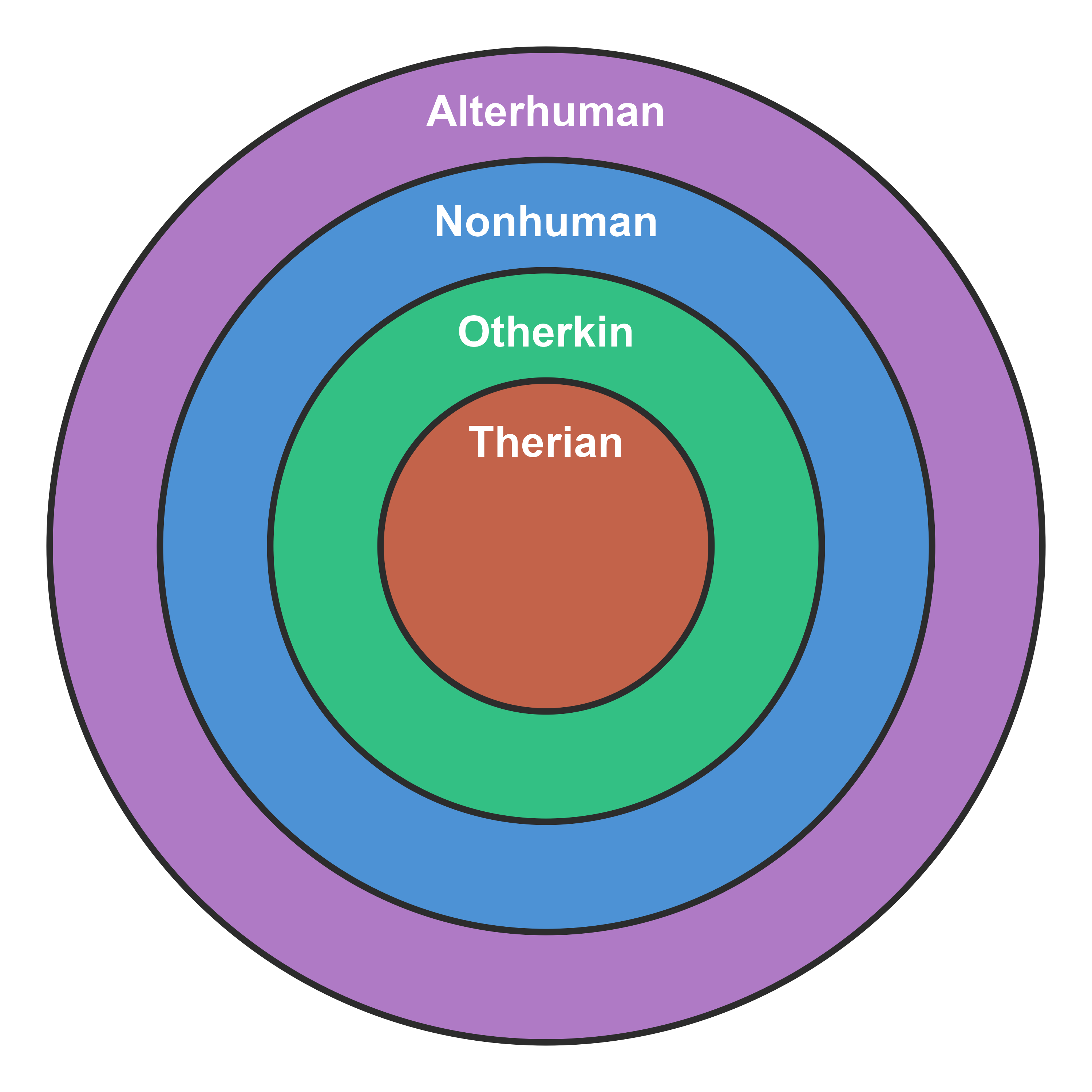
A diagram showing the therian community's place under the alterhuman umbrella

Therians draw a clear line between themselves and the furry fandom; while furries are interested in role-playing and dressing up as anthropomorphic cartoon animals, therians identify internally as natural animals. However, there may be a considerable overlap between the furry and the therian communities, as the results of four surveys have shown that between 25% and 44% of furries consider themselves "less than 100% human" compared to 7% of non-furries within the surveys.

Therians also claim to have differences between themselves and otherkin: while otherkin often base their identities on fictional creatures, like dragons, elves, unicorns, and angels, therians associate themselves with earthly animals. However, therianthropy is considered by many to be a subset of the broader otherkin umbrella, with some therians having participated in, or continuing to be involved in, otherkin communities. The term "alterhuman" was coined in 2014 as an umbrella label encompassing any type of identity that constitutes an alternative to the common social ideas of humanity, under which both otherkinity and therianthropy are commonly included.

== History ==
=== 1990s ===
Usenet newsgroups targeted towards fans of horror and fantasy genres such as alt.horror.werewolves (AHWW) were the first places to have members identify as therians. Initially, AHWW focused on exchanging experiences among those interested in werewolves in horror films and books, other fiction, and more broadly in mythology. Early discussion on AHWW quickly moved from recommending werewolf fiction to debating posters who claimed to be real lycanthropes, threads about fictional shapeshifters and claims of real animal-human transformation. Toward the end of 1993, AHWW began to feature increasing numbers of apparently sincere questions and personal accounts of experiencing animal transformation on mental, spiritual, and, for some, physical levels. Over the next few years, AHWW posters increasingly shared accounts of feeling or becoming animal in shamanic trance, meditation, and other altered states of consciousness. Community members coined a range of neologisms, including "shifter", "were", "theriomorph", and eventually "therianthrope", to describe these reported experiences.

== Demographics ==
In a small study from 2024 of 200 alterhumans' Tumblr blogs, 49% identified as LGBTQ+, 28% struggled with mental health, and a quarter identified as neurodivergent. Religious minorities made up a very small percentage of the population, at about 2.5%, despite spiritual reasons behind the identity being slightly more common than psychological reasons (61% compared to 58.5%). These statistics are from a population who identify as a non-human animal from conviction rather than choice.

A survey comparing 112 therians and 265 non-therians found that therians on average scored higher on measures of autistic traits (especially social skills and communication) and on schizotypy dimensions of unusual experiences and introverted anhedonia, while not differing on cognitive disorganization. Therians were more likely to report having received a mental health diagnosis and to score above a standard cut-off for elevated autistic traits. At the same time, there were no differences between groups on self-acceptance, personal growth, or purpose in life, and therians scored higher on autonomy but lower on positive relations with others and environmental mastery. Statistical modelling indicated that being therian buffered the usual negative relationships between autistic traits or introverted anhedonia and autonomy, implying that a well-integrated therian identity can act as a protective factor for those experiencing higher levels of autistic traits and schizotypy.

The therian community exists mainly online, with many of its members living in the United States or Western Europe. However, since most relevant surveys recruit through English-speaking online spaces and in-person studies have been conducted only in North America and Western Europe, available data on therian demographics appears unrepresentative of the global therian population. The therian community has also become visible in a number of Spanish-speaking countries, including Argentina, Mexico, Chile, Uruguay, Peru, Costa Rica, Honduras, Guatemala, El Salvador and Spain, where public events and media debates have taken place.

== See also ==
- Mermaiding – Swimming dressed in a mermaid costume
- Mysticism – Traditions of human transformation aided by religious experiences
- Narrative identity – Psychological theory
- Plural identity – Individuals with multiple personalities
- Xenogender – Gender identities outside of the gender binary

== Sources ==
- Baldwin, Clive; Ripley, Lauren (2020). "Exploring Other-Than-Human Identity: A Narrative Approach to Otherkin, Therianthropes, and Vampires". Qualitative Sociology Review. 16 (3): 8–26. doi:10.18778/1733-8077.16.3.02. hdl:11089/38377. ISSN 1733-8077.
- Grivell, Timothy; Clegg, Helen; Roxburgh, Elizabeth C. (2014). "An Interpretative Phenomenological Analysis of Identity in the Therian Community". Identity. 14 (2): 113–135. doi:10.1080/15283488.2014.891999. ISSN 1528-3488.
- Proctor, Devin (2019). On Being Non-Human: Otherkin Identification and Virtual Space (PhD thesis). The George Washington University. ISBN 978-1-392-06041-4. ProQuest 2211490902. Archived from the original on 2 June 2026.
- Luiggi-Hernández, José G.; Fein, Elizabeth; Bradley, Jennifer; Pelly, Jenna; Roberts, Sharon E.; Gerbasi, Kathleen C. (March 2025). "The jackal in the city: An empirical phenomenological study of embodied experience among therians and otherkin". The Humanistic Psychologist. 53 (1): 40–58. doi:10.1037/hum0000350. ISSN 1547-3333.
- De Groot, J. J. M. (1901). The Religious System of China. Vol. IV. Leiden: Brill. p. 171.
- Brinkley, F. (Frank); Kikuchi, Dairoku (1915). A history of the Japanese people from the earliest times to the end of the Meiji era. University of California Libraries. New York [etc.] : The Encyclopædia Britannica Co. p. 774.
- Bricker, Nat L. (May 2024). Mental health and well-being of nonhuman-identified individuals: The role of minority stress and resilience (PhD thesis). Palo Alto University. ISBN 979-8-3844-3281-4. ProQuest 3108481641. Archived from the original on 1 October 2024.
- Robertson, VL (13 January 2014). "The Law of the Jungle: Self and Community in the Online Therianthropy Movement". Pomegranate: The International Journal of Pagan Studies. 14 (2). doi:10.1558/pome.v14i2.256.
- Bricker, Natalie (25 April 2016). Life Stories of Therianthropes: An Analysis of Nonhuman Identity in a Narrative Identity Model (BA thesis). Lake Forest College Publications. Archived from the original on 15 July 2023.
- Jackson, Nikky (2019). Alter-humanity: An examination into other than human individuals through the lens of identity (MA thesis). Lancaster University. Archived from the original on 10 July 2024.
- Lupa (2007). A Field Guide to Otherkin. Immanion Press. ISBN 978-1-905713-07-3.
- Proctor, Devin (September 2018). "Policing the Fluff: The Social Construction of Scientistic Selves in Otherkin Facebook Groups". Engaging Science, Technology, and Society. 4: 485–514. doi:10.17351/ests2018.252. ISSN 2413-8053.
- Cavar, Sarah (1 May 2025). "Access Fictions: Clarity, Violence, and the Promise of transMad Opacity". TSQ Transgender Studies Quarterly. 12 (2): 162–177. doi:10.1215/23289252-11710358. ISSN 2328-9252.
