= Egregore =

Occult concept

An egregore (also spelled egregor; from French égrégore, from Ancient Greek ἐγρήγορος, egrēgoros 'wakeful') is a concept in Western esotericism of a non-physical entity or thoughtform that arises from the collective thoughts and emotions of a distinct group of individuals.

== Overview ==
In magical and other occult traditions, it is typically seen as having an independent existence, but in other kinds of esotericism, it is merely the collective mind of a religious community, either esoteric or exoteric. In the latter sense, as a collective mind, the term collective entity, preferred by René Guénon, is synonymous with egregore. See the usage overview below.

In the apocryphal Book of Enoch, the term had referred to angelic beings known as watchers, and it was also used by associated (Enochian) traditions to refer to the specific rituals and practices associated with these entities. Some other literary and religious works, such as The Manuscript Found in Saragossa, have also made references to these angelic beings.

== Variant descriptions ==
=== As independent angelic being ===
Egregores had been quite independent entities in the Book of Enoch, and there was then no notion of them arising from a collective. In literature, especially older literature, "egregores" have often been straightforward references to these Enochian entities. This was the case in Jan Potocki's novel The Manuscript Found in Saragossa, which referred to egregores as "the most illustrious of fallen angels". The French author Victor Hugo, in La Légende des siècles ("The Legend of the Ages", 1859), also uses the word égrégore, first as an adjective, then as a noun, while leaving the meaning obscure.

=== As spiritual elite ===
The Traditionalist School philosopher Julius Evola, in his Revolt Against the Modern World, referred to an elite of spiritually aware people, who keep Tradition alive, as "those who are awake, whom in Greek are called the εγρῄγοροι", apparently alluding to the Watchers, and the most literal sense of their name, which is "wakeful" or "awake".

=== As group mind ===
In esotericism, the term "egregore" has been used to denote a "group mind" or "collective consciousness" of a religious community. As René Guénon said, "the collective, in its psychic as well as its corporeal aspects, is nothing but a simple extension of the individual, and thus has absolutely nothing transcendent with respect to it, as opposed to spiritual influences, which are of a wholly different order". This usage was followed by Gnosis magazine and by Olavo de Carvalho, and, according to Guénon, began with Éliphas Lévi. See the section on the history of this usage.

=== As independent magical being arising from collective mind ===
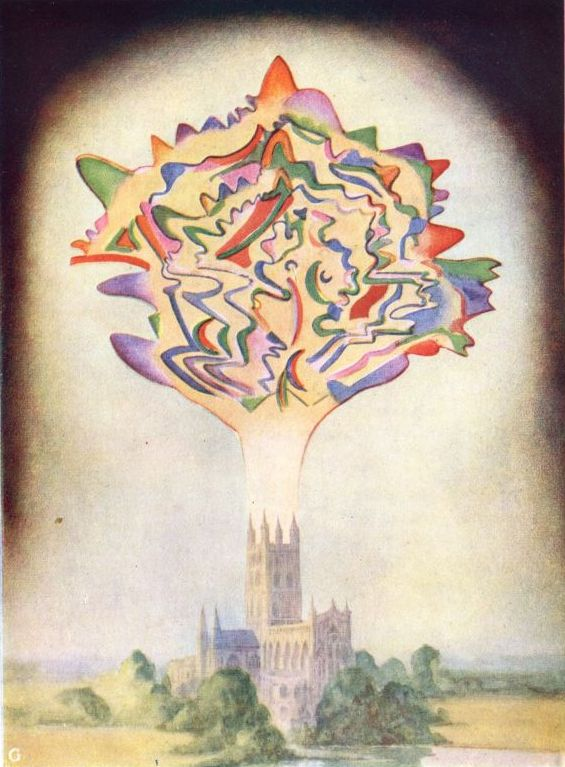
Thought form of Charles Gounod's music, according to Annie Besant and C.W. Leadbeater in Thought Forms (1901)

Some authors seem to have merged the esoteric concept with the Enochian concept to arrive at an idea of "spiritual entities" that "feed off the thoughts and energy of a unified multitude", as the website Occultist.net described it, while nevertheless having more of a life of their own – their more specific features and powers will depend on the particular author. Kate Strong, writing for the newsletter "Know Thyself, Heal Thyself", described egregores as "symbols, ideas, or ideals that exist in the collective psyche of a group of people and are thought to have an autonomous existence". This usage seems to have come largely from the Meditations on the Tarot, as may be seen in the next section. The concept of a tulpa is similar, as Gary Lachman and Mark Stavish noted.

== In occult and magical thought ==
=== In Meditations on the Tarot ===
The Meditations on the Tarot described the Antichrist as "an egregore, an artificial being who owes his existence to collective generation from below". Elsewhere, the book described egregores as "demons engendered by the collective will and imagination of nations". The book cites, but does not completely agree with, the usage of Robert Ambelain in his work La Kabbale pratique. Ambelain had defined the egregore as "a force generated by a powerful spiritual current and then nourished at regular intervals, according to a rhythm in harmony with the universal life of the cosmos, or to a union of entities united by a common characteristic nature". The author of the Meditations on the Tarot described this passage from Ambelain as "a definition which leaves nothing more to be desired", but disagreed with Ambelain's description of Catholicism, Freemasonry, and Protestantism as egregores.

=== In the work of Gary Lachman ===
Gary Lachman followed the usage of the Meditations on the Tarot in his book Dark Star Rising, which went on to suggest that Pepe the Frog may be an egregore in this sense – or a tulpa, which Lachman saw as a similar phenomenon. In the usage of Lachman and of the Meditations on the Tarot, "there are no 'good' egregores, only 'negative' ones". Lachman cited Joscelyn Godwin's The Golden Thread – which had itself cited the Meditations on the Tarot – as a source for the idea that, while a religious (or other) group who creates an egregore can "rely" on it as "an efficacious magical ally", "the egregore's help comes at a price", since, as Godwin had put it, its creators must thenceforth meet the egregore's "unlimited appetite for their future devotion."

=== In the works of Peter Carroll ===
Liber Null & Psychonaut, by the British chaos magician Peter J. Carroll, uses the word egregore for the first time at the end of the following passage:

Religion takes the view that consciousness preceded organic life. Supposedly there were gods, angelic forces, titans, and demons setting the scene before material life developed. Science takes the opposite view and considers that much organic evolution occurred before the phenomenon of consciousness appeared. Magic, which has given more attention to the quality of consciousness itself, takes an alternative view and concludes that organic and psychic forms evolve synchronously. As organic development occurs, a psychic field is generated which feeds back into the organic forms. Thus each species of living being has its own type of psychic form or magical essence. These egregores may occasionally be felt as a presence or even glimpsed in the form of the species they watch over.

The book goes on to say that "those who have perceived the human egregore usually describe it as God", and that "magicians consider that all life on this world contributes to, and depends on, a vast composite egregore which has variously been known as the Great Mother, the Anima Mundi, the Great Archon, the Devil, Pan, and Baphomet."

=== In the work of Frater Tenebris ===
Following this usage, though giving no citations, the glossary in the 2022 book The Philosophy of Dark Paganism, by Frater Tenebris, defines an "egregore" as "an occult term for an independently functioning spiritual entity created by one or more magick practitioners. Many egregores begin as thought-forms but then become capable of operating independently of the practitioners." It defines "thought-form" as "an esoteric entity created by magick", and "magick" as "a spiritual practice and process to influence the probability of events."

The book itself mentions egregores in the context of "archetypism", a view that understands "the different gods and goddesses" as "either psychological structures, similar to Carl Jung's archetypes, or different currents of arcane energy found in the Cosmos that are anthropomorphized." Noting that "some archetypists consider the gods to be thought-forms created from worship and prayer by generations of believers", it says that "over time these thought-forms may become egregores that exhibit some autonomy apart from their worshipers", and that "one might imagine these gods along the line of Neil Gaiman's deities in the novel American Gods."

=== In Theosophy ===
Mauricio Medeiros, writing for the theosophist website Estudo Teosófico, defined an egregore as "an astral, mental, or spiritual construct sustained by several people over a long period of time, giving it a character of permanence that does not depend on any particular individual". While saying that egregores have no "life of their own", Medeiros nevertheless emphasized their independence, noting that egregores "can be associated with physical locations", so that "when we enter an environment and feel uncomfortable, what we are often experiencing is the clash between the energies expressed by the egregores of the place and our own energies."

== In other esotericism ==
The Book of Enoch, 1:5, refers to "ἐγρήγοροι", which is usually translated as "watchers". As René Guénon says, these are "entities of a rather enigmatic character that, whatever they may be, seem to belong to the 'intermediary world'; this is all that they have in common with the collective entities to which the same name has been applied" in esoteric literature.

=== In the work of René Guénon ===
While Guénon notes that he had "never used the word 'egregore' to designate" what he preferred instead to call a "collective entity", he notes that he had described these same entities in his Perspectives on Initiation, in the following passage:

Each collectivity can thus be regarded as possessing a subtle force made up in a way of the contributions of all its members past and present, and which is consequently all the more considerable and able to produce greater effects as the collectivity is older and is composed of a greater number of members. It is evident, moreover, that this 'quantitative' consideration essentially indicates that it is a question of the individual domain, beyond which this force could not in any way intervene.

Guénon believed that prayer is not directly addressed to spiritual entities such as gods or angels, but rather, "consciously or not, addresses itself most immediately to the collective entity, and it is only by the intermediary of this latter that it also addresses the spiritual influence that works through it". Olavo de Carvalho believed that, according to Guénon's view, the prayers of persons who are not members of a community are ineffectual.

=== Origin and development of the concept in esotericism ===
According to Guénon, the term was first used to designate these collective entities by Éliphas Lévi, "who, to justify this meaning, gave it an improbable Latin etymology, deriving it from grex, 'flock,' whereas the word is purely Greek and has never signified anything but 'watcher.'" According to Mark Stavish's description in his 2018 book Egregores, however, Lévi's Le Grand Arcane ("The Great Secret", 1868) "clearly identifies the word egregore with the Kabbalistic lore of those beings who were said to be the fathers of the Nephilim", i.e., the Watchers. Lévi described them as "terrible beings" that "crush us without pity because they are unaware of our existence."

Following the usage of "egregore" as a "collective entity", a 1987 article by Gaetan Delaforge in Gnosis magazine defines an egregore as "a kind of group mind which is created when people consciously come together for a common purpose".

Olavo de Carvalho's 2017 course on esotericism presented a division of types of rites: rites are divided into magic rites and religious rites, and religious rites are further divided into propitiatory, sacrificial, aggregation, and initiation rites. Aggregation rites are rites which are directed to the egregore of a community, and make someone a member of it. Olavo cited René Guénon's view that prayer is directed primarily to the egregore, without noting that Guénon himself did not use the term.

== See also ==
- Akashic records – Term in theosophy and anthroposophy
- Anima mundi – Concept in metaphysics
- Collective unconscious – Terms of psychiatry
- Faith healing – Prayer and gestures perceived to bring divine intervention in physical healing
- Gestalt psychology – Theory of perception
- Jungian archetypes – Psychological concept
- Memetics – Study of self-replicating units of culture
- Panpsychism – Philosophical view that consiousness is a ubiquitous feature of reality
- Pathetic fallacy – Attribution of human emotion and conduct to non-human things
- Synchronicity – Jungian concept of the meaningfulness of acausal coincidences
- Tulpa – Entity manifesting from mental powers
- Vitalism – Idea about the nature of living organisms

== Bibliography ==
=== Primary sources ===
- Hugo, Victor (2002) [1859]. Guyaux, A.; Hovasse, J. (eds.). Victor Hugo: La légende des siècles: première série: actes du colloque de la Sorbonne des 12-13 janvier 2002 (in French). France: Presses de l'université de Paris-Sorbonne.
- Lévi, Éliphas (1868). Le grand arcane, ou l'occultisme dévoilé [The Great Secret, or Occultism Unveiled] (in French).
- Potocki, Jan (1996) [1847]. The Manuscript Found in Saragossa. Penguin Publishing Group. ISBN 978-0140445800.

=== Secondary sources ===
- Benchamma, Abdelkader (2022). Ibars, Stéphane (ed.). Abdelkder Benchamma: Egregore. France: Actes Sud Editions. ISBN 978-2330144999.
- Butler, Walter Ernest (1970). "The Egregore of a School". Servantsofthelight.org. The Servants of the Light.
- Dominguez, I. (2008). Spirit Speak: Knowing and Understanding Spirit Guides, Ancestors, Ghosts, Angels, and the Divine. Red Wheel Weiser. ISBN 978-1601630025.
- Faugerolas, M. (2015). Angels: The Definitive Guide to Angels from Around the World. Penguin Publishing Group. ISBN 978-0399176401.
- Greer, J. M. (2017). Circles of Power: An Introduction to Hermetic Magic. Aeon Books Limited. ISBN 978-1904658856.
- Greer, J. M. (2021). Inside a Magical Lodge: Traditional Lodge Methods for Modern Mages. Aeon Books Limited. ISBN 978-1913504755.
- Lachman, G. (2008). Politics and the Occult: The Left, the Right, and the Radically Unseen. Quest Books/Theosophical Publishing House. ISBN 978-0835608572.
- Leviton, R. (2004). The Emerald Modem: A User's Guide to Earth's Interactive Energy Body. Hampton Roads Publishing Company. ISBN 978-1571742452.
- Manitara, O. (2014). Manuel essénien de la paix [Essene Peace Manual] (in French). Canada: Éditions Essénia. ISBN 978-2897243258.
- Riaikkenen, Roza; Riaikkenen, Margarita (2004). The Laws of Life. Trafford. ISBN 978-1412017930.
- Robinson, M. (2017). The Astral H.D.: Occult and Religious Sources and Contexts for H.D.'s Poetry and Prose. Bloomsbury Academic. ISBN 978-1501335839.
- Sophia, A. (2013). Sacred Sexual Union: The Alchemy of Love, Power, and Wisdom. Inner Traditions/Bear. ISBN 978-1620550076.
- Zagami, L. L. (2018). The Invisible Master: Secret Chiefs, Unknown Superiors and the Puppet Masters Who Pull the Strings of Occult Power from the Alien World. CCC PUB. ISBN 978-1888729702.
- Constable, Simon (May 21, 2018). "What Magic Got Trump Elected?". Forbes.
- Ellenwood, Ray (1992). Egregore: A History of the Montréal Automatist Movement. Toronto: Exile Editions. ISBN 978-1550960211.
- Flowers, S. Edred (1995). Fire & Ice: Magical Teachings of Germany's Greatest Secret Occult Order. Llewellyn's Teutonic Magick Series (2nd ed.). Llewellyn Publications. ISBN 0-87542-776-6.
- Reed, Annette Yoshiko (2005). Fallen angels and the history of Judaism and Christianity: The Reception of Enochic Literature. Cambridge University Press. ISBN 978-0521853781.
- Stavish, Mark (2018). Egregores: The Occult Entities That Watch Over Human Destiny. Inner Traditions/Bear. ISBN 978-1620555774.
