= Snapewives =

Harry Potter fandom community

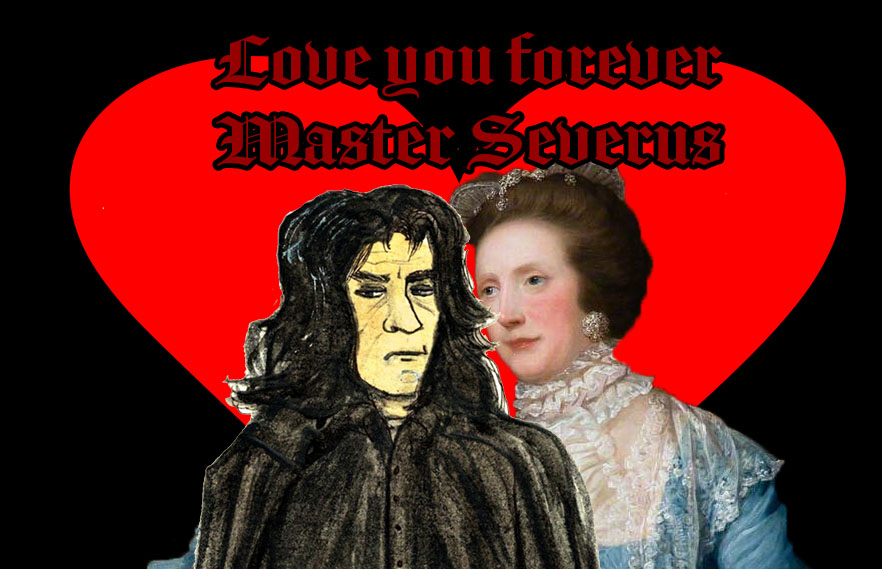
A typical form of fanart montage which the Snapists would use to express their love, depicting themselves as a romantic duo with the fictional character

Snapewives or Snapists were a small fandom community and religious movement during the 2000s, based around deification of the fictional character Severus Snape from the Wizarding World media franchise.

The Snapeism movement were only ever consisted of a handful of individuals, of which three were the most prominent and best documented. The adherents were generally middle-aged women who communicated on LiveJournal and various online forums. They were ridiculed by other Wizarding World followers who perceived the movement as extreme and delusional.

Its adherents generally believed that Severus Snape (referred to by first name or as "master") exists as a spiritual being, independently of the works in which he is described, who has the power to interact and communicate with his believers through channelling. They described Severus as an omniscient and omnipresent deity to whom they professed deep romantic, sexual and emotional love, describing their relationship to him as a marriage. They also believed that Severus inspired author J.K. Rowling to write her books, but that he was ultimately misrepresented and wrongly described as an antihero who ultimately dies.

The movement has been attributed to many causes, including the portrayal of the character by Alan Rickman in the film series. The movement has been cited as an example of modern-day religious beliefs, misogyny against female fandom and female sexuality, the crossover between religion and fandom, the comparative legitimacy of faiths, and the difficulty in defining religion as a concept.

== See also ==
- Astral projection
- Reality shifting
