= G. O. Mebes =

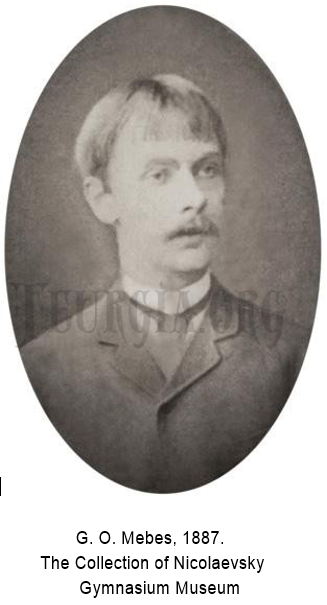

Baron Gregory von Mёbes (2 November 1868 (Riga, Latvia, then Russian Empire) - 1930 or 1934 (Ust-Sysolsk, Russia, then Soviet Union), better known by his pseudonym G. O. Mebes (Note: Letters G. O. correspond to the initials of Grigory Ottonovich (Mebes)), was a leader of Russian Freemasonry, Grand Lodge "Astraea", with more than 200 years of existence at that time, and the founder of the "Initiation School of Western Esotericism".

== Biography ==
Mёbes graduated in 1891 from the Physics and Mathematics Faculty of Saint Petersburg University and from 1904 to 1917 he taught physics, mathematics and French at the Czarskoye Selo Real school and the Nicolaevsky Gymnasium, at the women's school of the Ministry of Public Education and in the Page Corps and the Nicolaevsky Cadet Corps. He gave up his academic career and devoted himself to the study of the esotericism.

Mёbes was one of the leaders of Russian Freemasonry and the Rosicrucian Order, and an active member of the Martinist Lodge and theorician of occultism. The Martinist Lodge was a branch of the French Kabbalistic Order of the Rose-Cross. It was started in Russia by the French Occultist Gérard Encausse (Papus). At the end of 1910, Mёbes became the Secretary of the St. Petersburg branch of the Order. In August 1912 there was a schism between members of the Lodge and the St. Petersburg branch of the Order, the lodge "Apollonia" guided by Mёbes (with the initiatory name of Butator), which declared its autonomy as member of an independent Order called "Autonomous Martinist russian Obedience", led by Mёbes, which was also leading the lodge "The Star of the North" of Saint Petersburg . The same year he broke with his first wife, Olga Yevgrafovna Nagornova.

From 1911 to 1912 Mёbes was writing under the pen name GOM, was giving lectures in Petersburg entitled A Concise Encyclopedia of Occultism, which was following the theories of Papus. The lectures were extremely popular . There are many recollections of them which are written in the history of Russian occultism at the beginning of the century. In his lectures, GOM drew in Kabbalah and Tarot cards into a single entity, based on Arcana of the Tarot. The 11 December 1912 Mëbes initiated Nicolas Rogalev Girs (Nabusar) (1898 - 1972) in the lodge "The Star of the North" of Saint Petersburg. In 1916 the name of the Order was changed in "Order of Martinist Eastern Obedience". The Chapter of the Order consisted of seven persons, and the occult magazine Isis was the official organ of the russian martinists. From 1918 to 1921, Mebes was reading lectures about the Zohar in St. Petersburg. His second wife, Maria Nesterova, lectured about the history of religion.

== Initiation School of Western Esotericism ==
The School had an "external circle", attended by all of his students, as well as some internal groups formed according to the progress of his disciples.

In 1912, Mёbes agreed that his disciples should publish the lessons about the 22 Major Arcana of Tarot, lessons through which Mёbes introduced the key concepts of occultism. The book was published as The Course of Encyclopedia of Occultism, and the first edition sold out quickly.

After the Bolshevik coup in late 1917, when the new Soviet regime began persecuting religion and spiritualism, the School continued operating clandestinely. However in 1926, the School and the domicile of its members were raided by Soviet authorities: the documents destroyed and those who were linked the School were arrested. In the middle of 1928 the Leningradskaya Pravda and the Krasnaya Zvezda newspapers reported that "an investigation in the Great Lodge Astraea, led by the 70-year old Black Occultist Mebes, was opened by KGB agents.". Mёbes was arrested and deported to a gulag in the Solovetsk islands, in the White Sea, sub-Arctic region, where he died in 1930, according to A. M. Aseev, or in 1934 according to B. V. Astromov-Kirichenko.

== Posthumous spread of Mёbes's ideas ==
Nina Rudnikoff (alt. spelling, Nina Roudnikova), a disciple of Mёbes from the internal circle groups at the School, took all of her notes from Mёbes's lessons about the Minor Arcana of Tarot with her when fleeing Russia. In Tallinn, Estonia, she entrusted them to her friend, the Russian theosophist Catarina Sreznewska-Zelenzeff, who was about to leave Europe and move to Brazil. Rudnikoff asked Sreznewska-Zelenzeff to give her notes to "someone dignified" so that the lessons could be preserved.

Years later, in Brazil, Sreznewska-Zelenzeff met Nadia, widow of Gabriel Iellatchitch, another disciple and friend of Mёbes, and they began living together. Nadia's brother, Alexandre Nikitin-Nevelskoy, another follower of Mёbes's School who had a profound knowledge of esotericism, subsequently moved from Chile to live with them. By combining the notes they had, the three of them reestablished the course of the Minor Arcana of Tarot in its entirety, and it was translated into Portuguese.

Some copies of the Encyclopedia reached Brazil and were read by Marta Pécher, who was impressed by the book and attempted to contact former disciples of Mёbes. She translated the book into Portuguese and published it under the title Os arcanos Maiores do Tarô (The Major Arcana of Tarot), edited by Editora Pensamento.

A new English translation of the Tarot Majors course was published on 8 February 2020 by Shin Publications, incorporating notes from Meditations on the Tarot by Valentin Tomberg at the end of each Arcana. ISBN 978-1-9163365-3-7 They have also now published an English translation of the course on the Minor Arcana and a book by Nina Rudnikoff (Nina Pavlova Roudnikova) called The Solar Way.

== Influence ==
Mёbes's work influenced the writer Mouni Sadhu, who acknowledged that his book, The Tarot, was based on that of Mebes, and the Méditations sur les 22 arcanes majeurs du Tarot by Valentin Tomberg.

== Bibliography ==
- Ottonovich Mёbes, Gregory (1912), Encyclopedia of the Occultism (Курс Энциклопедии Оккультизма), St. Petersburg.
