= A Field Guide to Otherkin =

2007 non-fiction book

- Author: Lupa
- Publisher: Megalithica Books
- Publication date: 2007
- Pages: 310
- ISBN: 978-1-905713-07-3
- Dewey Decimal: 133

A Field Guide to Otherkin is a 2007 book by the neopagan writer and psychologist Lupa. It discusses the otherkin community, a group of people who believe they are, in some sense, not entirely human. Lupa, who considered herself otherkin at the time of the book's publication, conducted a qualitative study of online otherkin communities between 2005 and 2006; she wrote A Field Guide to Otherkin based around its findings, synthesizing its conclusions about otherkin belief and its origins, common otherkin identities, and the religious and spiritual beliefs of otherkin.

The book presents otherkin belief as a spiritual phenomenon. It presents data that most survey respondents ascribed their beliefs to reincarnation, feeling that they were other than human in a past life, and that most identified with neopaganism and related new religious movements. A Field Guide to Otherkin analyzes the impact of both mythology and recent popular culture on otherkin belief, discussing subjects including folkloric depictions of non-human creatures, such as elves; fictionkin, a subset of otherkin who consider themselves fictional characters or members of fictional species; and claims of otherkin identity the author considers questionable or spurious, such as possessing supernatural powers or claiming to be multiple species. The book has multiple appendices, including an interview between Lupa and a psychotherapist about otherkin, where the therapist disputes characterizations of otherkin identity as a mental illness.

A Field Guide to Otherkin was published in 2007 by Megalithica Books, the non-fiction imprint of speculative fiction publisher Immanion Press, which focuses on books on occultism and alternative spirituality. It was the first book dedicated in its entirety to otherkin. A Field Guide to Otherkin received positive reviews, focusing on its research and the balanced view it took of its subject matter; nonetheless, it received criticism for its printing quality and perceived failure to consider non-otherkin readers. The book sparked scholarly interest in the topic, being widely cited in academic works on otherkin and influencing scholarship of internet-mediated religious movements. In 2013, Lupa took A Field Guide to Otherkin out of print, announcing that she no longer identified as otherkin and felt the book overshadowed her later works. Its limited accessibility following its withdrawal has been criticised by scholars.

== Background ==
Otherkin are people who believe they are, in some sense, not entirely human. It is an umbrella term which can also refer specifically to people who consider themselves mythical or fantastical beings, such as elves or dragons. Other subsets include therianthropes, people who identify as real-world animals, and fictionkin, people who identify as members of fictional species or specific fictional characters. These groups can overlap, with some concepts not fitting obviously into a particular category, and individual terminology varies widely. Despite some misconceptions, otherkin do not believe they are physically non-human. Rather, the concept is rooted in religion, spirituality, or psychology; for instance, otherkin may believe they were other than human in a past life, or in some way possess the soul of a non-human creature. Though predecessors of the concept predate the internet, the term "otherkin" itself and the communities around it are almost completely internet-based; the phenomenon has been understood as a hyper-real religion, a form of belief that "mix[es] elements from religious traditions with popular culture".

Lupa, the author of A Field Guide to Otherkin, is a writer and counselling psychologist based in Portland, Oregon. She has been involved in neopagan and occult practice since her teenage years. At different times, Lupa has been affiliated with Wicca, chaos magic, and neoshamanism; as of 2018, she identifies as a naturalistic pagan. At the time of A Field Guide to Otherkin's publication, Lupa was a wolf therian and an active participant in otherkin and therian communities. A Field Guide to Otherkin was her second book as a sole author, following the 2006 publication of Fang and Fur, Blood and Bone: A Primal Guide to Animal Magic. She had also contributed a chapter to the 2007 anthology Magick on the Edge: An Anthology of Experimental Occultism and co-wrote Kink Magic: Sex Magic Beyond Vanilla with her then-husband, the esoteric author Taylor Ellwood.

== Synopsis ==
The heptagram, a symbol of elves or fairies in many neopagan traditions, is used on the cover of the book

A Field Guide to Otherkin aims to summarize and explain the otherkin subculture through qualitative research. Based around the answers of 131 respondents to a survey Lupa conducted in online otherkin communities, it discusses the concept itself, hypotheses on how people come to consider themselves other than human, and common forms of otherkin experience. The book includes an extensive appendix, including quantitative demographic data, an analysis of otherkin from a psychological perspective, and a bibliography of otherkin-related works and websites.

The book opens with a basic introduction to otherkin, defining the term as referring to "a person who believes that, through either a nonphysical or (much more rarely) physical means, s/he is not entirely human". It devotes significant attention to clarifying that otherkin do not consider themselves literal members of a nonhuman species; Lupa gives the example that, although she considers herself a wolf in some sense, she knows her body is wholly human. A Field Guide to Otherkin then theorizes about the origins of otherkin identity. Based on survey responses, Lupa concludes that otherkin most commonly consider themselves to have been nonhuman in a past life and reincarnated as humans. Minority perspectives include magical or spiritual connections, unspecified "connections" or "associations" with a concept, and psychological explanations such as autistic or schizotypal neurotypes.

After introducing the broad concept, A Field Guide to Otherkin focuses on subsets of the term. The most common subjects of otherkin belief, or "kintypes", in the book's survey sample are therians or therianthropes (real-world animals), vampires, elves or fairies, and mythological creatures such as dragons. These chapters discuss both mythological and more recent cultural depictions of common kintypes, and how these influence otherkin belief. For instance, in the chapter on elves, Lupa analyzes the impact of Celtic fairy folklore, elves in Middle-earth, and the tabletop role-playing game Changeling: The Dreaming on elfkin and their beliefs. She also discusses precursor movements to those of modern otherkin, such as the Silver Elves, a proto-otherkin subculture from the 1960s and 1970s.

The last chapter of this section discusses miscellaneous kintypes for which Lupa received too few survey respondents for a detailed analysis; these include angels, demons, kitsune, and fictionkin, people who consider themselves aligned with fictional characters or members of a fictional species. Lupa describes the last of these categories as particularly controversial, finding that even otherkin communities disagreed on whether such claims could be valid. She discusses common arguments for and against the possibility of fictionkin, such as whether reincarnation could apply to fictional characters, the plausibility of fictionkin claims by people whose interpretation of a character differs radically from their portrayal in their originating work, and how concepts such as chaos magic combine popular culture with spiritual or religious beliefs.

A Field Guide to Otherkin dedicates a chapter to analyzing the general religious and spiritual beliefs of otherkin. Lupa finds the majority of otherkin in her sample to be neopagans, with common affiliations including Wicca, Heathenry, polytheistic reconstructionism, and eclectic paganism. A minority of her respondents followed larger religions, with several survey-takers describing themselves as Christian, Buddhist, Hindu, or Shinto. Some respondents were agnostic or atheist; these otherkin generally considered their identities philosophical or psychological, rather than spiritual. Lupa discusses the relationship between otherkin identity and wider spiritual or religious belief, noting that while many of her respondents considered their identity and spirituality synonymous, others separated the concepts or were unsure how they were connected. As well as new religious movements, she characterizes otherkin as interested in occult magic and the practice of glamourbombing, leaving unusual objects and creative works, such as printed lines of poetry or occult-themed visual art, in public for people to find.

The book's final pre-appendix chapter is targeted at readers who think they may be otherkin. Lupa addresses what she considers "false" or "wannabe" otherkin claims, such as people who claim unusual kintypes—giving the example of someone claiming to be "the leader of a herd of purple carnivorous unicorns from Alpha Centauri"—those who claim to have supernatural powers, or those whose supposed kintypes change frequently. She recommends that readers seek out offline otherkin or pagan communities if available, and warns readers against becoming overly invested in the "novelty and romanticism of being something other than human" or withdrawing entirely from mainstream society. Lupa also cautions readers against discussing their potential otherkin identity, due to the concept's poor reputation; she quotes descriptions of otherkin as "crazy people on the internet" and "degenerate role-players" as representative of mainstream opinion on the subject.

A Field Guide to Otherkin includes multiple appendices, such as a list of contemporary in-person otherkin meetups and a template of the survey itself. One appendix summarizes an interview between Lupa and a psychotherapist about the concept of otherkin. In response to the position that otherkin belief is a mental illness, Lupa decided to interview a therapist unfamiliar with the concept and seek her opinion on whether it was inherently a sign of poor mental health. Her interlocutor deemed it non-pathological, suggesting it may be linked to phenomena such as individuation from a conservative family but finding the concept itself compatible with good mental health. The book ends with an annotated bibliography of works relevant to otherkin, such as books on pagan studies, websites run by otherkin, and publications by particular authors such as Doreen Virtue and Robert Anton Wilson.

== Publication, reception, and legacy ==
Research for A Field Guide to Otherkin began in September 2005, when Lupa posted her survey to her Livejournal and to a number of online otherkin communities. She collected responses until October 2006. The book was published in 2007 through Megalithica Books, the non-fiction imprint of speculative fiction publisher Immanion Press, which focuses on books on occultism and alternative spirituality. It is 310 pages long, including appendices and bibliography.

A Field Guide to Otherkin was the first full book dedicated to the subculture. Reviewers received the work positively, praising its research and bibliography, its balanced view of the subject matter, and its voice and writing style. Nonetheless, elements of A Field Guide to Otherkin received criticism; one reviewer made note of its printing and layout issues, such as poor typographical kerning and difficulty distinguishing chapter and section headings.

Multiple writers discussed how the book handled its unusual subject matter, both praising and criticising Lupa's attitudes towards her survey-takers. Nico Mara-McKay, editor-in-chief of the occult culture publication Spiral Nature Magazine, appreciated A Field Guide to Otherkin's "rational and balanced view of the subject" but expressed skepticism of Lupa's "fair treatment" of fictionkin, people who believe themselves fictional characters or species. Michelle Mueller, a minister and scholar at the California Institute of Integral Studies, praised the book but felt that Lupa failed to consider the possibility of non-otherkin readers. She criticised a statement near the end of the book that most readers were presumably people who identified as otherkin or were considering the possibility, feeling that "[i]f the material within A Field Guide to Otherkin is worth reading, it should not be for therianthropes alone".

The publication of A Field Guide to Otherkin was influential on scholarship of internet-mediated new religious movements and hyper-real religions. The historian of religion Carole M. Cusack identifies A Field Guide to Otherkin as the starting point of scholarly interest in otherkin and deems it one of the more significant published works on the subject. The book has influenced academic definitions and understandings of the concept, being cited for its demographic data and explication of various otherkin-related subcultures; by some estimates, all published works about otherkin have cited it. In an ethnographic study of otherkin online communities, the cultural anthropologist Devin Proctor said A Field Guide to Otherkin had a reputation as "the best source of information in print" amongst both otherkin and researchers of the subculture, describing Lupa as "a bit of a celebrity" within such communities for her research.

Lupa took A Field Guide to Otherkin out of print in 2013, six years following its publication. In her announcement, she stated she no longer identified as a therian, feeling the framework that she was something other than human no longer fit her spiritual practice and that she instead related to wolves in a totemistic sense. She also felt the book dominated outside perceptions of her and was "sick of talking about otherkin", wishing to focus on her more recent works in interviews. The book's increased price and reduced accessibility following its withdrawal has, according to Cusack, left "a gap in the literature". Nikky Jackson, a scholar of religious studies specializing in otherkin, criticised its difficulty to access as reducing its scholarly value. She argued that A Field Guide to Otherkin's "sheer inaccessibility" lessened the potential for later otherkin communities to critique or interpret the work, as well as making it more difficult for researchers to cite it in their own publications.
