= Valentin Tomberg =

Estonian-Russian Christian mystic, polyglot scholar and esotericist

Valentin Arnoldevitch Tomberg Photo: National Archives of Estonia (ERA.957.3.507)

Valentin Tomberg (February 26, 1900 – February 24, 1973) was an Estonian-Russian Catholic mystic, polyglot scholar and esotericist.

== Early life ==
Valentin Tomberg was born on February 26, 1900 (February 14 in the Old Russian Julian calendar) in St. Petersburg, Russia. His parents were Lutheran, the mother was a Russian and the father of Baltic German origin, he was an official in the Tsarist government. As an adolescent, Tomberg was drawn to Theosophy and the mystical practices of Eastern Orthodoxy. In 1917, he was initiated into Hermetic Martinism by G. O. Mebes. He also discovered the works of Rudolf Steiner. In 1920, Tomberg fled with his family to Tallinn, in newly independent Estonia. Tomberg worked as a nurse at a hospital, in a pharmacy, on a farm and in the Tallinn Central Post Office. He studied languages and comparative religion at the University of Tartu in Estonia.

== Career ==
In 1925, Tomberg joined Rudolf Steiner's Anthroposophical Society. In the early 1930s he married divorcée Maria Belozwetow (née Demski) (died March 1973), a Polish Catholic; they had a son, Alexis (August 31, 1933 – 1991). During the 1930s, Tomberg, then in his 30s, published his original occult research in a number of articles and lectures, which made him a controversial figure in Anthroposophical circles. As a result of the controversies, in 1938 the Tombergs were invited to move to Amsterdam. In 1940, however, he was asked to withdraw from the Anthroposophical Society in the Netherlands as well, by its chairman Willem Zeylmans van Emmichoven (1893–1961), due to his being too controversial.

He was active in Dutch anti-Nazi resistance by hiding allied pilots and parachutists. Tomberg and a Russian friend, the poet-philosopher Nikolai Nikolaevich Bielotsvietov (Nikolaj Belozwetow) (1892–1950), allegedly approached the leader of the Christian Community, Emil Bock (1895–1959) about creating a new ritual focusing on Sophia, but were rebuffed. He then joined the Russian Orthodox Church in the Netherlands but left shortly thereafter, as its leadership turned out to be sympathetic to National Socialism.

Towards the end of World War II, Tomberg received a Ph.D. in jurisprudence from the University of Cologne, where he had moved in 1944. He studied under Ernst Arthur Franz von Hippel (1895–1984), professor of law in the University of Cologne, who became a personal friend and an anthroposophist. Tomberg's thesis was published as Degeneration and Regeneration in the Science of Law, followed by the thesis Peoples' Rights as Humanity's Rights in 1946. Around this time, he converted to Roman Catholicism.

Shortly after the war he helped founding a community college in the Ruhr area. In 1948, however, he moved to England, where he became a translator for the BBC, monitoring Soviet broadcasts during the Cold War at BBC Caversham Park. He retired early, in 1960, to the suburbanized village of Emmer Green, not far from Reading, where he worked on the manuscripts for his main work, written in French and entitled Méditations sur les 22 arcanes majeurs du Tarot (Meditations on the Tarot in English).

== Death ==
Tomberg died on a holiday in Mallorca. Two weeks later his wife and collaborator Maria died as well. A Dutch or German rough translation of the manuscript to Méditations sur les 22 arcanes majeurs du Tarot was circulated in the Netherlands against Tomberg's intentions a year before his death, but was only formally published in 1984.

Robert A. Powell and others have reportedly identified Tomberg as the 20th century incarnation of the boddhisattva who they say will in time incarnate as the Maitreya Buddha, a claim contested by T. H. Meyer and other Anthroposophists.

== Published works ==
Tomberg's major written works were published posthumously. They include:

- Lazarus, komm heraus: vier Schriften (Come Forth, Lazarus), a study of Christian mysticism, written in German and published in 1985, ISBN 3-906371-08-5. Translated as Covenant of the Heart and published in English in 1992. Also published as Lazarus, come forth! Meditations of a Christian esotericist on the mysteries of the raising of Lazarus, the Ten Commandments, the Three Kingdoms, and the Breath of Life. ISBN 1-58420-040-5.
- Méditations sur les 22 arcanes majeurs du Tarot (a study of the Tarot of Marseilles) published anonymously in French in 1980 (with an afterword by a Catholic theologian and priest, Hans Urs von Balthasar). An English translation was then published in 1985, with Robert A. Powell basing his rendering on the author's original French manuscript, whereas the published French edition (ISBN 978-2700703696) does not always follow the French original manuscript.
- Christ and Sophia: anthroposophic meditations on the Old Testament, New Testament, and apocalypse, Great Barrington, MA: SteinerBooks, 2006. ISBN 0-88010-565-8.
- Degeneration und Regeneration der Rechtswissenschaft, Bonn: Bouvier, 1974 [German]. ISBN 3-416-01032-9.
- Le Mat itinérant. L'amour et ses symboles. Une méditation chrétienne sur le Tarot, introduced and edited by Friederike Migneco and Volker Zotz. Luxembourg: Kairos Edition 2007 [French with German translation]. ISBN 978-2-9599829-5-8.
- Innere Gewissheit: über den Weg, die Wahrheit und das Leben, introduced and edited by Friederike Migneco and Volker Zotz. Luxembourg: Kairos Edition 2012, [German] ISBN 978-2-919771-00-4.
