= Internarrative identity =

Theory on identity

Internarrative identity is building upon the notion of narrative identity, the idea that our identities are shaped by the accounts we give of our lives. The central tenet of internarrative identity is that the ability of individuals to shape their lives is extended by multiple autobiographical narratives with associative principles beyond temporality. This concept was developed in 1997 by Ajit K. Maan in the central text Internarrative Identity.

== Overview ==
While the foundation of Narrative Identity Theory is the holding together of life experiences in a unified structure, Internarrative Identity Theory celebrates what have previously been considered problematic areas of experience - conflict, marginalization, disruption, subversion, deviation - as places of possibility for self creation. Internarrative Identity Theory locates the solution of narrative conflict within the problem itself. Existence in-between authoritarian discourses and dominant cultures enables an extended form of agency wherein a subject is able to undermine traditional associations, assumptions, concepts, and at the same time, create links between otherwise incommensurable world views. Rather than being a passive recipient of dominant discourses the Internarrative subject is uniquely able to subvert regulatory identity practices.

== See also ==
- Postmodernism
- Hermeneutics
- Feminism
- Deconstruction

== Bibliography ==
- Ajit K. Maan, Internarrative Identity, second edition, Placing the Self, Rowman and Littlefield, 2010.
- Ajit K. Maan, Haunting Henry James, Infinity, 2009
- A. Maan, "Narrative Authority: Performing the Postcolonial Self" Social Identities: Journal for the Study of Race, Nation and Culture. Routledge, May, 2007
- A. Maan, "Post-Colonial Practices and Narrative Nomads:Thinking Sikhism beyond Metaphysics" Sikh Formations: Religion, Culture, Theory. Routledge, Dec 2005
- Ajit K. Maan, Internarrative Identity, Rowman and Littlefield, 1999
