= Severus Snape =

Fictional character in the Harry Potter series

- Harry Potter character
- Alan Rickman as Severus Snape (Note: Harry Potter and the Order of the Phoenix (2007))
- First appearance: Harry Potter and the Philosopher's Stone (1997)
- Created by: J. K. Rowling
- Portrayed by: Alan Rickman (film series); Alec Hopkins (teenager; film series); Benedict Clarke (child; film series); Paapa Essiedu (television series)

In-universe information
- Alias: The Half-Blood Prince
- Occupation: Headmaster of Hogwarts School of Witchcraft and Wizardry (1997–1998); Defence Against the Dark Arts Professor of Hogwarts (1996–1997); Potions Professor of Hogwarts (1981–1996)
- Family: Tobias Snape (father); Eileen Snape (mother)
- Nationality: British
- House: Slytherin
- Born: 9 January 1960
- Died: 2 May 1998

Severus Snape is a fictional character in the Harry Potter series of novels by J. K. Rowling. In the first five novels, he is the professor of Potions at Hogwarts School of Witchcraft and Wizardry. In the sixth book, he teaches Defence Against the Dark Arts, and in the seventh book he ascends to the position of headmaster before his death. Snape is hostile, yet heroic towards Harry Potter throughout the series; Harry eventually learns that Snape was bullied by Harry's father, James Potter, and was in love with Harry's mother, Lily Evans. This causes Snape to have mixed feelings towards Harry, who resembles his father greatly, but has his mother's eyes. As the series progresses, Snape's character becomes more layered and enigmatic. A central mystery is unravelled concerning his loyalties. Snape dies at the hands of Lord Voldemort in the seventh book, at which time his back story is revealed. Despite his attraction to the Dark Arts and Voldemort's ideology of wizard supremacy, Snape's love for Muggle-born Lily Evans, Harry's mother, eventually compelled him to defect from the Death Eaters. He then became a double agent for Albus Dumbledore and the Order of the Phoenix. The fact that Lily chose James Potter, Harry's father, only fuels Snape's hostility towards Harry.

Snape's character has been widely acclaimed by readers and critics. Rowling described him as "a gift of a character", whose story she had known since the first book. Elizabeth Hand of The Washington Post explained that Snape's life "is the most heartbreaking, surprising and satisfying of all of Rowling's achievements".

Alan Rickman portrayed Snape in all eight Harry Potter films, released between 2001 and 2011. Paapa Essiedu will portray the character in the upcoming HBO TV adaptation.

== Character development ==
In an interview, Rowling described Snape's character as an "antihero". She has said that she drew inspiration for Snape's character from a disliked teacher from her own childhood, and described Snape as a horrible teacher, saying the "worst, shabbiest thing you can do" as a teacher is to bully students. However, she does suggest in the books that he is generally an effective teacher. Although Rowling has said that Gilderoy Lockhart is her only character that she "deliberately based on a real person", Snape was reportedly based, at least in part, on John Nettleship, who taught Rowling chemistry and employed her mother as an assistant at Wyedean School near Chepstow. Rowling based Snape's given name on "Severus Road" in Clapham, and his surname is borrowed from the name of a village in England. In a 1999 interview and again in 2004, Rowling singled out Snape as one of her favourite characters to write.

Rowling was less forthcoming about Snape than she was for other characters, because his true loyalties and motivations were not revealed until the final book. However, she hinted numerous times at Snape's important role, suggesting that people should "keep their eye on Snape". In 1999, answering a question regarding Snape's love life and the redemptive pattern to his character, Rowling expressed her surprise at the foresight. Rowling also disclosed that after the publication of Prisoner of Azkaban, there was one female fan who guessed Snape loved Lily Potter, making Rowling wonder how she had given herself away.

After the completion of the series, Rowling began to speak openly about Snape, discussing the contrast between his character arc and that of Albus Dumbledore. Rowling said "the series is built around [the Dumbledore and Snape storylines]", and maintained that she always knew what Snape would turn out to be at the end and that she carefully plotted his storyline throughout the series. "I had to drop clues all the way through because as you know in the seventh book when you have the revelation scene where everything shifts and you realise...what Snape's motivation was. I had to plot that through the books because at the point where you see what was really going on, it would have been an absolute cheat on the reader at that point just to show a bunch of stuff you've never seen before." Rowling further said in an interview that she wanted Snape to find redemption and forgiveness: "Snape is a complicated man...he was a flawed human being, like all of us. Harry forgives him...Harry really sees the good in Snape ultimately... I wanted there to be redemption."

== Appearances ==
=== Novels ===
==== Harry Potter and the Philosopher's Stone ====
Snape first appears in Harry Potter and the Philosopher's Stone, shortly after Harry arrives at Hogwarts. He is the school's Potions Master, though he is widely rumoured to covet the Defence Against the Dark Arts post. Snape himself confirms the rumour in Harry Potter and the Order of the Phoenix. Snape is a sinister and malicious teacher who makes frequent snide and disparaging remarks at Harry's expense. He quickly becomes the primary antagonist of the book, as Harry suspects him of plotting to steal the Philosopher's Stone, and of attempting to kill him. Only the climax of the book reveals that Professor Quirrell, in league with Lord Voldemort, is the real enemy; Snape, suspicious of Quirrell, had been looking out for Harry throughout the book.

In the final chapter, Dumbledore suggests that because Harry's father James had saved Snape's life when they were both students, even though the two detested each other, Snape felt responsible for Harry in return. As the final book reveals, this is not the full story. In any case, even after Quirrell's true role is revealed, Harry retains feelings of suspicion and resentment towards Snape, and their relationship remains tense. Snape's behaviour and attitude towards Harry also remain unchanged.

==== Harry Potter and the Chamber of Secrets ====
Snape has a minor role in Harry Potter and the Chamber of Secrets, where he helps Gilderoy Lockhart oversee Hogwarts's short-lived Duelling Club, but he has little interaction with the main plot. It is while attending the Duelling Club that Harry learns the Expelliarmus spell, which plays a significant role in later books, by seeing Snape use it.

==== Harry Potter and the Prisoner of Azkaban ====
In Harry Potter and the Prisoner of Azkaban, Snape demonstrates his expertise with potions by brewing the complex Wolfsbane potion for the new Defence Against the Dark Arts professor, Remus Lupin. Throughout the third book, Snape suspects that Lupin may be helping Harry's godfather Sirius Black enter Hogwarts castle; Sirius had been convicted (wrongly, as it is later revealed) of murdering Peter Pettigrew and innocent bystanders, and betraying the Potter family's hiding place to Voldemort. This suspicion stems from Lupin's friendship with Sirius and Harry's father, James, while they were all at Hogwarts as students. Near the climax of the book, Snape attempts to apprehend Sirius, but Sirius escapes with Harry's aid. Snape informs Dumbledore of this circumstance, and when Harry and Lupin are not punished, Snape retaliates by revealing to the entire school that Lupin is a werewolf, forcing the latter to resign his post.

Prisoner of Azkaban reveals more details about the connection between Snape and James. While in school together, Sirius once tricked Snape into almost entering the Shrieking Shack while Lupin was there, transformed into a werewolf. James realised the danger and stopped Snape, saving his life; this is the incident Dumbledore referred to at the end of the first book. Snape, however, believes James's actions were self-serving to avoid being expelled.

==== Harry Potter and the Goblet of Fire ====
Snape's role in the fourth novel, Harry Potter and the Goblet of Fire, is not substantially different from that of the previous three books. He is apoplectic when Harry is unexpectedly entered into the Triwizard Tournament. Later Harry accidentally falls into Dumbledore's Pensieve and views memories of several Death Eater trials from years before. At one point, Snape is named as a Death Eater by Igor Karkaroff, but Dumbledore comes to Snape's defence, claiming that although Snape had indeed been a Death Eater, he changed sides before Voldemort's downfall and turned spy against him. Later, Dumbledore assures Harry that Snape's reformation is genuine, though he refuses to tell Harry how he knows this, saying the information "is a matter between Professor Snape and myself".

At the end of the book, Dumbledore attempts to convince a disbelieving Minister for Magic, Cornelius Fudge, that Voldemort has returned. As proof, Snape willingly shows Fudge the restored Dark Mark on his arm. He is subsequently sent on a secret mission by Dumbledore. This mission, as had been implied in Harry Potter and the Order of the Phoenix and revealed in Harry Potter and the Half-Blood Prince, was to rejoin the Death Eaters and spy on Voldemort as a re-doubled agent, while pretending to spy on Dumbledore on behalf of Voldemort.

==== Harry Potter and the Order of the Phoenix ====
In the fifth novel, Harry Potter and the Order of the Phoenix, Snape returns to a more prominent role. With Voldemort having returned to a fully corporeal body, Snape continues working as a re-doubled agent for Dumbledore. He is seen prior to the start of school at Number 12, Grimmauld Place giving reports to the Order of the Phoenix. He has a very strained relationship with Sirius, who owns Grimmauld Place and must remain there in hiding. The two trade frequent snide remarks and at one point almost begin a duel. Snape taunts Sirius about the latter's not being able to take an active role in the Order's missions because of his fugitive status. Harry feels later that this taunting contributed to Sirius's willingness to take unsafe risks. Back at school, Snape's allegiance to the Order has no effect on his dislike for Harry.

Later in the book, Dumbledore has Snape teach Harry Occlumency, the protection of the mind from outside intrusion or influence. The sessions mainly consist of Snape forcibly reading Harry's mind to teach him to defend himself, but are made difficult by their mutual hostility. They end prematurely when Harry looks into Snape's Pensieve after Snape leaves the room and views Snape's worst childhood memory without his permission. He sees the memory of Snape being bullied by James and Sirius, and of calling Harry's mother Lily a Mudblood (a highly offensive term). Only in the final book is it revealed that, prior to this confrontation, Snape and Lily had been close friends.

Towards the end of the novel, Dolores Umbridge – the school's politically-appointed headmistress – captures Harry and interrogates him about Dumbledore's whereabouts. She sends for Snape, demanding that he provide the magical truth serum Veritaserum in order to force Harry to reveal any information he may be hiding. Snape claims that his supplies of the serum have been exhausted after Umbridge tries to use the drug previously on Harry. It is later revealed that Snape had, in fact, supplied Umbridge with fake Veritaserum on the prior attempt. Snape then carries Harry's cryptic warning about Sirius's capture to the other Order members, allowing them to come to the rescue in the Department of Mysteries. Harry still holds Snape partly responsible for Sirius's death, believing Snape's goading spurred Sirius into joining the battle.

==== Harry Potter and the Half-Blood Prince ====
In the second chapter of Harry Potter and the Half-Blood Prince, Bellatrix Lestrange and Narcissa Malfoy visit Snape at his home in Spinner's End. Narcissa's son Draco has been given a difficult task by Voldemort, and Narcissa swears Snape to an Unbreakable Vow that he will protect Draco, help him complete Voldemort's task, and finish the task himself if Draco fails. When questioned by Bellatrix about his loyalties, Snape says he has been working for Voldemort ever since Voldemort's return, and explains his actions in the previous books in that light. He points out that gaining Dumbledore's trust and protection has kept him out of Azkaban and free to operate on Voldemort's behalf.

At the start-of-term feast at Hogwarts, Dumbledore announces Snape as the new Defence Against the Dark Arts professor. Horace Slughorn, Snape's own former teacher, comes out of retirement and replaces him as Potions Master. With Snape no longer teaching Potions, Harry enrolls in Slughorn's class and is lent an old textbook until his new one arrives. Harry finds marginalia, including a variety of hexes and jinxes seemingly invented by an unknown student, and substantial improvements to the book's standard potion-making instructions. The text is inscribed as being "the Property of the Half-Blood Prince". The notes greatly bolster Harry's performance in Potions, so much so that he impresses Slughorn. Snape, who maintains that he "never had the impression that [he] had been able to teach Potter anything at all", is suspicious of Harry's newfound Potions success.

Later, during a fight with Draco, Harry casts one of the Prince's spells marked "For Enemies," and is horrified by the devastating wounds it inflicts on Draco's face and chest. Snape rushes to the scene and heals Draco, then interrogates Harry regarding the spell, using Legilimency to extract the source of Harry's knowledge (the Potions textbook) from Harry's mind. When Snape insists that Harry show him his Potions textbook, Harry hides the Prince's book and gives him Ron Weasley's book instead. As punishment for the attack and knowing Harry is lying about the textbook, Snape assigns Harry detention for every weekend until the end of the year, one of which collides with the final Quidditch match of the year.

Before leaving Hogwarts to accompany Dumbledore in locating another horcrux – part of Voldemort's soul – Harry discovers from Professor Trelawney that it was Snape who overheard the prophecy and told it to Voldemort, resulting in Voldemort hunting down Harry and his parents. Despite this and Harry's angry questions, Dumbledore avers his trust in Snape. Returning to Hogwarts after retrieving Voldemort's Horcrux, Harry and Dumbledore alight atop the school's astronomy tower. Gravely weakened by the horcrux's protective potion, Dumbledore tells Harry he must fetch Snape, but before Harry can leave, Draco suddenly arrives, intending to carry out Voldemort's order to assassinate Dumbledore, closely followed by other Death Eaters (followers of Voldemort), and Snape. Snape interrupts the planned murder, killing the headmaster himself. Harry, who is paralysed under his invisibility cloak by Dumbledore for his own protection, witnesses the kill, and is released upon Dumbledore's death. Enraged, he pursues Snape, Draco, and the Death Eaters as they flee the castle. Snape easily blocks Harry's spells and jeeringly points out Harry's mistakes, but never strikes back. During the confrontation, Snape reveals himself as the eponymous "Half-Blood Prince" (being the half-blood son of Muggle Tobias Snape and pure-blood Eileen Prince). Snape passes through the school gates and Disapparates with Draco in tow at the book's end. The full relationship between Dumbledore and Snape and the reason for Snape's actions remain unknown until the final book. In an interview, Rowling mentioned that at this point in the series, the Harry–Snape relationship has become "as personal, if not more so, than Harry–Voldemort."

==== Harry Potter and the Deathly Hallows ====
In Harry Potter and the Deathly Hallows, Voldemort and his Death Eaters have tightened their grip on the wizarding world. Snape is named Headmaster of Hogwarts, while Death Eaters Alecto and Amycus Carrow are appointed as Hogwarts staff. The novel focuses largely on Harry and his friends and events outside the school; therefore Snape plays a limited role at the start. In the course of the book, Harry and his friends find out that a few students attempted to steal the Sword of Godric Gryffindor, and that Snape subsequently sent it to be stored at Gringotts Wizarding Bank; however, that sword was only a copy. Later on, Harry and Ron are led to find the real sword by a Patronus taking the form of a doe. Towards the end of the book, Harry learns that this was Snape's Patronus, taking the same shape as Harry's mother Lily's Patronus, a visible sign of his lifelong love for Harry's mother, and that Dumbledore had asked Snape to ensure that Harry gained possession of the sword. The novel also reveals that Snape had covertly used his position as Headmaster to protect the students and to contain the Carrows.

Towards the end of the school year, Professors McGonagall, Flitwick, and Sprout force Snape to flee the school. Voldemort summons Snape to the Shrieking Shack. Erroneously believing Snape is the master of the Elder Wand and that Snape's death will make him the master of the Wand, Voldemort kills Snape by having his pet snake Nagini bite him through the neck. The dying Snape releases a cloud of memories and tells Harry, who has watched the entire scene from a hidden spot, to take and view them. The dying Snape asks Harry to look at him, since Harry has the eyes of his mother Lily which Snape loved, and Snape wants to have these eyes as the last thing he would see.

From these memories, Harry sees Snape's childhood and learns his true loyalties. In this vision, Harry learns that Snape befriended Lily as a child when they lived near each other. Upon their arrival at Hogwarts, the Sorting Hat placed Snape and Lily into Slytherin and Gryffindor Houses, respectively. They remained friends for the next few years until they were driven apart by Snape's interest in the Dark Arts; the friendship finally ended following the bullying episode that Harry had briefly seen in the fifth book, in which Snape calls Lily "Mudblood". Despite this separation and Snape's enduring animosity toward Lily's eventual husband James Potter, Snape continued to love Lily for the rest of his life.

The memories also show that as a Death Eater, Snape had revealed to Voldemort a prophecy made by Sybill Trelawney, causing Voldemort to attempt to prevent it by killing Harry and his parents. Snape, who had not realised until too late that Voldemort had interpreted the prophecy to be referring to Lily and her family (as it could've also referred to Frank and Alice Longbottom and their son Neville Longbottom), asked Voldemort to spare Lily. Still in terror for her life, he also approached Dumbledore, admitted his actions, and begged him to protect the Potters. Dumbledore chided him for thinking only of himself and not of Lily's husband and child, but agreed and ensured that they were placed under the Fidelius Charm. In return, Snape secretly allied himself with Dumbledore and the Order of the Phoenix as a double agent against Voldemort, using his powers of Occlumency to hide his betrayal from Voldemort. However, Snape demanded of Dumbledore that his love for Lily (his reason for switching sides) be kept a secret, especially from Harry, because of the deep animosity he felt towards Harry's father and his mixed feelings towards Harry (who reminded him of both his love for Lily Potter and her death, and his animosity towards James Potter). Dumbledore agreed and kept the secret throughout his life, although questioning Snape's request to "never reveal the best of you". Even with his efforts to protect her, Snape felt guilty and responsible for Lily's death at Voldemort's hands.

Snape's memories then reveal that Dumbledore had impetuously tried to use the Gaunt ring, which had been cursed by Voldemort, and had been suffering from a powerful curse. Snape's knowledge of the Dark Arts enabled him to slow the spread of the curse from Dumbledore's hand through his body, but he would have died within a year. Dumbledore, aware that Voldemort had ordered Draco to kill him, had asked Snape to kill him instead as a way of sparing the boy's soul and of preventing his own otherwise slow, painful death. Although Snape was reluctant, even asking about the impact of such an action on his own soul, Dumbledore implied that this kind of coup de grâce would not damage a human's soul in the same way murder would. Nevertheless, they both knew that Snape could not avoid what he had sworn to Narcissa at the beginning of the previous book. Snape agreed to do as the Headmaster requested. Snape's memories also provide Harry with the information he needs to ensure Voldemort's final defeat, in the form of conversations Snape had with Dumbledore.

Rowling noted in an interview that because Snape abandoned his post before dying or officially retiring, a portrait of him does not immediately appear in the Headmaster's office following his death. She adds, however, that she would like to think Harry made Snape's true loyalty and heroism known in the Wizarding world, and that he lobbied to ensure that a portrait be installed in the office. In a separate interview, Rowling discussed Snape's back story, saying she had planned it ever since she wrote the first book because the whole series is built around it and she considers him one of the most important characters of the seventh book.

==== Epilogue ====
In the epilogue to Deathly Hallows, set nineteen years after Harry defeats Voldemort, Harry has named his second-born son Albus Severus, after Albus Dumbledore and Severus Snape. As Albus is about to enter his first year at Hogwarts, he expresses concern that he will be sorted into Slytherin. Harry tells his son, "you were named for two headmasters of Hogwarts. One of them [Snape] was a Slytherin and he was probably the bravest man I ever knew."

== Portrayal in media ==
=== Film ===
Severus Snape is portrayed by Alan Rickman in all eight Harry Potter films. Rickman was Rowling's personal choice to portray the character. He had conversations with Rowling about his character and is one of the few Harry Potter actors that she spoke to prior to the completion of the book series about the future direction of the character. "He knew very early on that he'd been in love with Lily," said Rowling. "He needed to understand [...] where this bitterness towards this boy who's the living example of her preference for another man came from."

Teenage Severus Snape (Alec Hopkins) in Harry Potter and the Order of the Phoenix

Rickman used this knowledge of Snape's ultimate loyalties throughout the films to decide how to play certain scenes, deliver specific lines, or use body language to convey specific emotions. When the directors of the films would ask him why he was doing a scene a certain way or delivering a line in a specific manner, Rickman would simply reply that he knew something they didn't.

Rickman himself refrained from talking about Snape, asking readers to wait and "see what unfolds" in the course of the novels; however, he did say Snape is a complicated person, very rigid and full of himself; in an interview he went further, saying: "Snape isn't one who enjoys jokes and I strongly fear that his sense of humour is extremely limited... But in his defence, I will add that he didn't have an easy adolescence, particularly during his studies at Hogwarts." He also said Snape is a fascinating character, and that he takes immense pleasure in playing such an ambiguous person.

Rickman's performance as Snape was widely acclaimed by critics, fans and Rowling herself. Entertainment Weekly listed Rickman as one of the most popular movie stars in 2007 for his performance as Snape, saying: "As the icy, humourless magic instructor Severus Snape, Rickman may not be on screen long—but he owns every minute." Rickman also noted fans' reactions; in an interview, he said he found "that people in general adore Snape. He is sarcastic, stubborn, etc, etc. But he is also fascinating. I have a lot of fun impersonating him." Rickman was nominated for several awards for his portrayal of Snape, and in 2011, was elected the best character portrayal in all the Harry Potter films series.

In 2011, Empire magazine published an open letter from Rickman to J.K. Rowling, ruminating on the ten years of working on the Potter films and thanking her for telling the story.

In Harry Potter and the Order of the Phoenix, the fifteen-year-old Snape (portrayed by Alec Hopkins) makes a brief appearance in a flashback to Snape's youth. In the final film, Harry Potter and the Deathly Hallows – Part 2, the younger Snape, perhaps ten or eleven, is played by Benedict Clarke. In 2016, a fan film prequel, Severus Snape and the Marauders, was released online and Snape was played by Morgana Ignis.

Before Alan Rickman was offered the role of Severus Snape, the role was offered to Tim Roth, who turned it down in favour of portraying General Thade in Planet of the Apes.

=== Television ===
Snape is set to be portrayed by Paapa Essiedu in the HBO television adaption of the Harry Potter series.

=== Stage ===
Harry Potter and the Cursed Child is a play written by Jack Thorne from a story by Thorne, J. K. Rowling and John Tiffany. In the play, Draco Malfoy's son Scorpius finds himself in an alternate timeline in which Voldemort won the Battle of Hogwarts, killed Harry, and instituted a reign of terror. Scorpius desperately searches for help in restoring history to its original course. He finds that in this reality Snape is still alive and still teaches at Hogwarts, and asks for his help. At first Snape is suspicious of him, since this timeline's version of Scorpius is a bully and a Voldemort stalwart. But when Scorpius shows that he knows of Snape having been in love with Lily, Harry's mother – Snape's most closely guarded secret – Snape becomes convinced that he does indeed come from a different timeline where Harry and his friends won. Snape then reveals that he, together with the fugitive Ron and Hermione Granger, maintain the last remnants of Dumbledore's Army – still waging hopeless resistance against the all-powerful Voldemort. In talking with Scorpius, Snape had learned that Harry would name his son "Albus Severus" and would regard Snape as "probably the bravest man I ever knew" – and is deeply moved. Though having guessed that in the other timeline he would die, Snape nevertheless willingly helps Scorpius recreate this timeline – and being discovered by Dementors, Snape sacrifices himself in order to cover Scorpius' escape. Snape was originally portrayed by Paul Bentall in the West End.

== Characterisation ==
=== Outward appearance ===
Snape is described as a thin man with sallow skin, a large, hooked nose, and yellow, uneven teeth. He has shoulder-length, greasy black hair which frames his face, and cold, black eyes. He wears black, flowing robes which give him the appearance of "an overgrown bat". The youthful Snape had a "stringy, pallid look", being "round-shouldered yet angular", having a "twitchy" walk "that recalled a spider" and "long oily hair that jumped about his face".

In the chapter illustrations by Mary GrandPré in the American editions of The Prisoner of Azkaban, The Order of the Phoenix, and The Half-Blood Prince, Snape is depicted with a moustache and goatee, long black hair, and a receding hairline.

=== Personality ===
Snape is generally depicted as being cold, calculating, precise, sarcastic, and bitter. He strongly dislikes Harry and often insults him by insulting his father James. As the series progresses, it is revealed that his treatment of Harry stems from Snape's bitter rivalry with James when they were in school together. In particular, James and Sirius bullied Snape, which according to Alan Rickman caused the already lonely boy to further "shut himself in". Rowling further described the young Snape as insecure and vulnerable: "Given his time over again [Snape] would not have become a Death Eater, but like many insecure, vulnerable people he craved membership of something big and powerful, something impressive.[...] [He] was so blinded by his attraction to the dark side he thought [Lily] would find him impressive if he became a real Death Eater."

The adult Snape, on the other hand, is portrayed as very self-assured and confident of his abilities, to a degree that Rickman described as "full of himself." Director David Yates said Snape is a character with gravitas, authority and power. Snape typically displays a very calm and collected demeanour, rarely at a loss for words or taken off guard. His temper, however, is sometimes short where Harry is concerned and positively flares when dealing with his erstwhile tormentor Sirius, or when accused of cowardice. His otherwise impassive and aloof attitude seems to stem from his belief that people who cannot control their emotions are weak.

Like some other prominent members of Slytherin house, Snape is shown to be a clever and cunning wizard. He is intelligent and has a keen, analytical mind. In an interview, Rowling adds that Snape is immensely brave, and when asked if she considers Snape a hero, replied: "Yes, I do; though a very flawed hero. An anti-hero, perhaps. He is not a particularly likeable man in many ways. He remains rather cruel, a bully, riddled with bitterness and insecurity—and yet he loved, and showed loyalty to that love and, ultimately, laid down his life because of it. That's pretty heroic!"

=== Magical abilities and skills ===
All seven novels show Snape to be a very powerful wizard and to have been outstanding while a student. He specialises in potion making and has talent and passion for the Dark Arts. Sirius claimed that Snape knew more hexes and curses as a first-year student at Hogwarts than most seventh-years knew. Particularly gifted in potion making, Snape added major improvements to his Potions textbook while still a student.

Also as a student, Snape shows a rare gift for discovering new spells. Lupin describes Sectumsempra as Snape's "speciality" in Deathly Hallows. Snape is shown using this spell as a teenager against Harry's father James and in the aerial battle in the last novel when he accidentally hits George Weasley (acting as a Potter decoy) with it while actually aiming for a Death Eater who was trying to attack Lupin, permanently severing George's right ear. Despite Sectumsempra's deadly power, Snape can also heal the wounds it causes. Snape is adept at reversing or containing potentially fatal damage from other dark curses as well, due to his vast knowledge of Dark Arts, as he does when Dumbledore and then Katie Bell are cursed.

Skilful in the arts of Legilimency and especially Occlumency, Snape is able to both access the minds of others and protect his own thoughts—indeed, though Snape does not care for the term himself, Harry forms the uncomfortable impression early in the series that the Potions Master is able to "read minds." Being an Occlumens, Snape is able to keep his betrayal from Voldemort, who is himself described as being "the greatest Legilimens" in history. According to Rowling, Snape is the only Death Eater capable of producing a full Patronus, which, like Lily's, is a doe.

Snape is a talented duellist, able to hold off by himself (if only briefly) a group of three Hogwarts professors that included former duelling champion Filius Flitwick. Professor McGonagall later implies that Snape learned to fly without the use of a broom, a rare skill previously displayed only by Voldemort.

=== Family ===
Snape's family background is mostly shown in flashbacks during the course of the last three novels. Snape was born to Eileen Prince, a witch, and Tobias Snape, a Muggle, making him a half-blood (hence the name, "Half-Blood Prince"). This is rare for a Death Eater, as remarked in the last book, though Voldemort himself also had a Muggle father. Snape spent his early childhood living with his parents in a small house in Spinner's End. Snape's family was a poor one and he is described as wearing ill-fitting clothes "that were so mis-matched that it looked deliberate". As a child, Snape was apparently neglected and his parents often fought with one another. Snape was very eager to leave his home to go to Hogwarts. Towards the end of the last novel, Harry draws parallels between his childhood, Snape's, and Voldemort's.

=== Loyalties ===
Snape's true loyalty was one of the most significant questions in the series up until the end of the final installment, Harry Potter and the Deathly Hallows. Although the first five novels depict him as unfair and vindictive towards Harry and his friends, he invariably ends up protecting or otherwise helping them when they or their allies are in danger. Several characters express doubts about his loyalty, but Dumbledore's trust in him is generally taken to be the final word. Curiously, the same thing appears to happen on the opposite side, where it is shown that Bellatrix Lestrange mistrusts Snape and only the word of Voldemort seems to protect him from the suspicions of the other Death Eaters. The sixth novel, Harry Potter and the Half-Blood Prince, departs from that model. In the second chapter, Snape claims to have been working for Voldemort ever since the latter's return, and only pretending to help Dumbledore. By killing Dumbledore toward the end of the novel, Snape seems to place himself firmly in Voldemort's camp. Rowling maintains this impression through the early chapters of the seventh novel. However, near the climax of the book, Snape leaves Harry his dying thoughts (to be viewed in the Pensieve) and ultimately reveals to Harry that he had been loyal to Albus Dumbledore throughout the series. Snape's fierce devotion to and love of his childhood friend Lily, Harry's mother, is the foundation of that loyalty.

After Harry Potter and the Half-Blood Prince, Snape's loyalty was a matter of intense debate among the fans. The issue was given special attention in the marketing campaigns on behalf of the last book, Harry Potter and the Deathly Hallows. "Is Snape Good or Evil?" was one of the questions in Scholastic Inc.'s seven-question series, part of its marketing campaign for the book. As part of the Waldenbooks marketing campaign, two free stickers, one that said "Trust Snape" and another that stated "Snape Is A Very Bad Man" were available with the book. Borders published a separate book on the topic, The Great Snape Debate, containing essays and arguments from both sides of the debate.

== Reception ==
The secretive attitude and gradual unfolding of Snape's character was broadly admired, with Stephen Fry, narrator of the UK audiobooks, saying in 2003: "Most characters like Snape are hard to love but there is a sort of ambiguity—you can't quite decide—something sad about him—lonely and it's fascinating when you think he's going to be the evil one..., then slowly you get this idea he's not so bad after all." David Yates, who directed the final four films of the series, also expressed his views on the character, saying: "A character like Snape, where you're not really sure if he's a good guy or a bad guy, that gives you a latent tension... I think the coolest thing you can do with an audience is deny them a little bit of information." Rowling herself described Snape as "a gift of a character". Despite being less than kind, Snape quickly gained popularity within the fandom to a level that surprised Rowling herself, with infatuated fans admiring him and some even deifying him. Joyce Millman suggests in her essay "To Sir with Love" in the book Mapping the World of Harry Potter, that Snape is derived from a tradition of Byronic heroes such as Wuthering Heights' Heathcliff. Jenny Sawyer from The Christian Science Monitor commented on the character's development in the series. She claimed that Snape is the only protagonist who genuinely has a choice to make and who struggles to do the right thing, hence the only one to face a "compelling inner crisis". She believed the popularity of the character is due to the moral journey and inner conflict that Snape undergoes within the series, as it is the hero's struggle and costly redemption that really matter: "[Snape's] character ached for resolution. And it is precisely this need for resolution—our desire to know the real Snape and to understand his choices—that makes him the most compelling character in the Potter epic."

The final revelation of Snape's loyalty in Harry Potter and the Deathly Hallows was viewed positively by fans and critics alike. Daniel Radcliffe, who portrays Harry Potter in the movie series, expressed his delight, saying he was pleased to see that his theory that Snape would end up being a sort of tragic hero came through. Elizabeth Hand from The Washington Post wrote, "The much-maligned loner Snape does not come onstage until the latter part of "Deathly Hallows," but when he does the book becomes his: Snape's fate, more than Voldemort's, perhaps more even than Harry's, is the most heartbreaking, surprising and satisfying of all of Rowling's achievements."

IGN listed Snape as their 4th top Harry Potter character, saying that he makes "quite an impact in the Harry Potter series", and IGN's Joe Utichi called Snape his favourite Harry Potter character and praised his character development. Shortly after the release of the final film, MTV held a public poll for fans to vote for the best character in the series, and Snape was voted #1. Around the same time, Empire magazine held a public poll for fans to vote for the 25 greatest characters in the series, and Snape once again came in at #1. In May 2011, Snape was again voted as the No. 1 favourite Harry Potter character in a public poll held by the Bloomsbury publishing house.

== In popular culture ==
The character of Severus Snape has appeared in various animated parodies of Harry Potter. He is a starring character in Neil Cicierega's online Potter Puppet Pals parodies, and has a centric episode titled Bothering Snape. Also, the video The Mysterious Ticking Noise with the chorus "Snape, Snape, Severus Snape" was the winner for "Best Comedy" of the year 2007 at YouTube; it currently has over 170 million views. Snape is also parodied as Professor Santory Snapekin in Sluggy Freelance's recurring series Torg Potter. In the first parody, Torg mistakenly thinks Professor Snapekin is plotting to achieve ultimate power.

In a 2004 sketch on Saturday Night Live in which Lindsay Lohan appears as Hermione Granger, Snape is portrayed by Will Forte. Snape has also been parodied in UK television. Comic Relief released a story called Harry Potter and the Secret Chamberpot of Azerbaijan, in which Snape is played by Jeremy Irons. Snape appeared in a Harry Potter parody named "Louis Potter and the Philosopher's Scone" in Alistair McGowan's Big Impression show, played by Alistair McGowan himself. In the Harry Bladder sketches in All That, Snape appears as Professor Chafe (portrayed by Jeremy Rowley), whose legs were badly chafed, causing him to be unnecessarily mean. Many sketches feature students brewing potions that did silly things, like enlarge students' behinds, give males large breasts, or change people into bras. In a sketch comedy named "Cooking With..." on Australian TV series The Wedge, Snape is played by Anthony Ahern, and catches Harry and Hermione making love. In Team Starkid's A Very Potter Musical, and its subsequent sequels A Very Potter Sequel and A Very Potter Senior Year, Snape is played by actor Joe Moses.
