= Quadrobics =

Form of physical exercise

Quadrobics is a form of physical exercise and a youth subculture that involves using all four limbs, as if imitating quadrupedal animal locomotion.

== Etymology and history ==
The word "quadrobics" is a portmanteau of the words "quattuor" (Latin for "four") and "aerobics". Quadrobics began as a sports hobby and over time turned into a trend that started to take over social networks. It is said to have been invented by Japanese sprinter Kenichi Ito, who in 2008 set the world record for running the 100-m track on all four limbs. Four years later, he beat his own record and was listed in the Guinness Book of Records. As of 2026, the record is 14.55 seconds, set by Ryusei Yonee in September 2025.

== Quadrobics as a sport and fitness activity ==
Quadrobics is not yet officially recognised as a sport, but its enthusiasts organise competitions within their communities. As a sport, quadrobics is close to parkour. As a fitness activity, it, according to Vogue, "combines elements of aerobics and callisthenics" and, having been designed to "engage all four limbs simultaneously", provides an "effective full-body workout". As fitness expert Tomi Akande explained to the magazine, a quadrobic workout routine trains several major muscle groups, improving strength, agility, and coordination.

The basic quadrobics movements include:

- running or walking on all fours / trotting (e.g. crab walks, lizard walks);
- crawling (e.g. bear crawls);
- leaping;
- balancing;
- high jumps;
- mountain climbers;
- the renegade row.

In 2015, a fitness activity called "crunning" became popular in Australia. Crunning is running on all four limbs, the term is a portmanteau of "crawling" and "running".

== Effects on health ==
Quadrobics can have numerous health benefits, as it provides a full-body workout, and improves coordination as well as general muscle strength.

However, quadrobics require most excess weight to be supported by the front of the body, potentially leading to wrist, elbow, or shoulder strain. While exercises like jumping and crawling are known to increase flexibility and strength, the overall effects quadrobics have on long-term health have not yet been studied.

== Quadrobics as a subculture ==
In Russia, the quadrobers (or quadrobists) youth subculture combining cosplay (dressing up as animals) with quadrobics (like running around on all fours) drew public attention in the spring of 2024. On 16 April, the head of the League for Safe Internet, Ekaterina Mizulina, drew attention to Internet hate messages that called for beating up people named "quadrobers". A week later, the commissioner for children's rights of the Republic of Tatarstan, Irina Volynets, spoke alarmedly about children in animal costumes and the necessity to define the line between play and deviation. In September, a viral video featuring singer Mia Boyka who, in front of a concert audience, ridiculed an 8-year-old female fan wearing cat ears and a tail, caused a scandal and led to a discussion of the new quadrober phenomenon on the Russian 1st Channel talk show Let Them Talk, spanning several episodes.

The subculture is popular mainly among children and adolescents aged 7 to 14. Quadrobists wear animal costumes and also imitate animal movements and behavior: walk on all fours, growl, bark and meow, climb trees and interact with fellow quadrobists as if they all were animals. The species of animals most popular among quadrobists are cats, foxes, dogs, and wolves.

Quadrobists are often confused with furries, but there are differences. Quadrobists focus on imitating real animals, while furries role-play anthropomorphic animal characters (thus creating so-called fursonas, a portmanteau of "fur" and "persona").

The difference between quadrobists and therians is that therians truly identify as an animal, while quadrobists see quadrobics as a physical activity and a sport. Neither quadrobists nor furries consider themselves non-human animals.
