= Kenichi Ito (athlete) =

Japanese four-legged runner (born 1982)

Personal information
- Native name: いとう けんいち
- Born: 伊藤 健一; 8 May 1982 (age 43) Tokyo, Japan

Kenichi Ito (Japanese: いとう けんいち, Hepburn: Itō Ken'ichi; real name: 伊藤 健一; born 8 May 1982) is a Japanese athlete from Tokyo. He has held the Guinness World Record for running 100 meters on all four limbs, multiple times, most recently from 6 November 2015 until 30 June 2022. The current record is held by Collin McClure. Ito set a best time of 15.71 seconds in Tokyo's Komazawa Olympic Park, shaving 0.15 seconds off the previous record of 15.86 seconds, by Katsumi Tamakoshi. Before Tamakoshi's record, Ito held the record of 16.87 seconds, set on 14 November 2013. He also held the record before that, having set a time of 17.47 seconds on 15 November 2012, and the record before that of 18.58 seconds in 2008. Ito spent nine years studying how animals like African patas monkeys move. He used to work as a janitor and mopped floors on all fours to practice his four-limbed running technique. As of 2016, he runs a company dealing in solar energy. He can be seen chasing a man in the video for the song "My Love Is My Disease" by the Australian rock band the Jezabels.

== See also ==
- Quadrobics
