= Plural identity =

Individuals with multiple personalities

Plural identity or plurality is a self-reported identity used by those who believe they experience multiple distinct consciousnesses, identities, or self-states. Various communities dedicated to plurality exist online, including sites for blogging or instant messaging. The plural subculture also includes some who practice tulpamancy as part of the identity.

The related term "multiplicity" is used within clinical psychology and by some plural people to describe the experience of being multiple. In clinical research, multiplicity is typically associated with symptoms of mental illness such as dissociative identity disorder (DID) or identity disturbance. However, some members of plural communities reject the suggestion that their experiences are inherently disordered and may even report finding their identities and associated experiences to be soothing.

== Origins and characteristics ==
The identity and its related vocabulary was first present in mailing lists of the 1980s. In the 1990s, online plural communities and their associated organizations emerged in greater abundance, and by 2001, online communities dedicated to plurality started to appear. Consensus to use plurality as an umbrella term emerged in 2018 when more than 23,000 votes were cast across different support groups and platforms in support of the term. According to licensed counselor Emily Christensen, this "was, in itself, a historic moment for Plurals as they organized together in a way they never have previously". In 2019, the terms endogenic and traumagenic were discussed during a presentation at the Plural Positivity World Conference.

Some in the plural community practice tulpamancy (borrowed from Tibetan culture); similarities between that practice and the experience of multiplicity are a major conversation point in plural communities. Plural communities continue to exist online through social media including blogging sites such as LiveJournal, Tumblr, and more recently, TikTok, Reddit, YouTube, and Discord servers.

Community members often identify as "systems"– multiple distinct identities or personalities in the same body. Those distinct identities are often called "headmates" or "systemmates". Psychologists commonly call them "alters" or "parts", and so do some plural people, but other plural people dislike these terms. Plural systems may describe a dominant or controlling headmate as "fronting" or, in cases when there is more than one, "co-fronting". Headmates that identify as animals or other non-human entities may also identify as "otherkin", a separate but overlapping community.

Certain plural terminology is taken from queer spaces, such as coming out of the closet. There is also a documented overlap between transgender and plural identities; transgender headmates (different from the body's sex) are not uncommon. A considerable contingent of autistic people identify as plural which, according to Christensen, may possibly be due to neurodivergency being traumatising in a neurotypically dominant society.

According to a doctoral thesis written by a Manchester Metropolitan University student, "systemhood" seems to have certain identifiable commonalities. For example, plurals who described themselves as "non-disordered" typically found systemhood to be soothing, while those with DID typically found it to be distressing. Also commonly reported was that a system's headspace exhibited elaborate individualities that changed based on specific emotions or events. A different study on tulpamancers reported that they also visualised an inner world, commonly calling it a "wonderland". Most systems interviewed in two separate studies reported that their headmates were aware of and communicated with each other. Christensen provided accounts of headmates marrying or procreating new headmates.

== Mental health ==
Multiplicity has been proposed as an "extreme form of identity splitting" present in individuals with symptoms of DID. A study by Turrel et al. reported that many they interviewed with plural identities said they felt disconnected from their body in experiences that matched dysmorphia and gender dysphoria, while additional stigma derived from popular media which often portrays those with plural identities as dangerous. Alternatively, recent clinical research has questioned whether identifying with multiplicity or plurality necessarily leads to distress. Indeed, some people with plural identities do not agree with, or seek, a DID diagnosis, instead rejecting the suggestion that there is anything inherently pathological about their experiences. Clinical scrutiny of plural social media content has generated backlash from some plural community members who view what they call the "system medicalist" or "sysmedical" approach to be gatekeeping or undermining their lived experience. By contrast, a different, largely DID-diagnosed sub-group within the plural community has been known to "call out" others they believe to be fabricating their experience of plurality. This sometimes includes arguing that the plural community should exclude those who are undiagnosed or identify as endogenic (believing that their identity does not arise from trauma).

A rise in self-diagnosed DID cases has coincided with a growing popularity of social media content relating to DID and plural identities, a development that dovetails with ongoing concern over links between social media and mental health, particularly in relation to TikTok communities. Some professionals also worry that online spaces could sociogenically exacerbate adverse effects of DID. In the Harvard Review of Psychiatry, Salter et al. hypothesized that the rise in the 2020s of social media self-diagnoses was the result of multiple intersecting factors including undiagnosed neurodevelopmental issues, social isolation, and hardships associated with the COVID-19 pandemic, drawing a parallel to the significant increase in tic-like presentations to Tourette syndrome clinics during this period. The publication also warned that distinguishing genuine DID cases from malingered, factitious, or imitative DID is difficult. On the other hand, most members of the plural community who identify specifically as endogenic systems reject the DID label and do not claim the diagnosis.

Other reports suggest that participation in plural communities might remedy some aspects of social isolation arising from DID. According to The Plural Association, a Netherlands-based nonprofit founded to "empower Plurals, no matter the words or labels they use to define their unique and individual experiences", "[d]enying the existence of separate experiences can be harmful and may not facilitate healing. Acknowledging and respecting the multiplicity-plurality of individuals with DID is essential for promoting understanding, acceptance, and support." The extent to which adopting a plural identity can be regarded as a healthy way of coping is under-researched, though Ribáry et al. noted that all interviewees in a 2017 study reported that discovering the notion of plurality and participating in related communities was "helpful and therapeutic" to them. On a further note, Elizabeth Schechter, Associate Professor of Philosophy at the University of Maryland, reported that the related practice of tulpamancy was used as a coping method during some practitioners' mental health crises. She along with religious studies PhD student Elizabeth Hale at UC Santa Barbara equated such practices with praying, noting that they could potentially impute therapeutic benefits for mental health and wellbeing.

== Glossary ==
Fronting
The act of controlling the body.
Co-fronting
When two or more headmates are fronting simultaneously.
Fronter
The headmate that currently controls the body.
Switching
When the fronter becomes a different headmate.
Headmate

One of a system's distinct identities.
Headspace

The concept of a mental world in which headmates interact together. Similar to tulpamancy's wonderland.
Multiplicity
A phenomenologically defined version of plurality.
Singlet
A person that does not experience plurality or is not a system.
System
The collective term for all of a plural person's headmates.
System name
A name that represents the system as a whole.
Traumagenic
A term used in plural communities for plurality that a person describes as arising from or being rooted in psychological trauma.
Endogenic
A term used in plural communities for plurality that a person describes as not originating entirely from psychological trauma.

== Notable people ==
- Akwaeke Emezi – Nigerian writer and visual artist (born 1987)

== See also ==
- Hypostatic model of personality – View that people present themselves in different aspects
- Personality style – Psychological characteristics of an individual
- Post-traumatic stress disorder – Mental disorder associated with trauma
- Spirit possession § Medicine and psychology – Purported control of a human body by spirits, ghosts, demons
- Subpersonality – Personality mode allowing a person to cope with psychosocial situations

== Sources ==
- Schechter, Elizabeth (March 2024). "Introducing Plurals" (PDF). Journal of Cognition and Neuroethics. 9 (2): 95–141. Archived (PDF) from the original on 25 June 2026.
- Christensen, Emily M. (1 June 2022). "The online community: DID and plurality". European Journal of Trauma & Dissociation. 6 (2) 100257. doi:10.1016/j.ejtd.2021.100257. ISSN 2468-7499.
- Hoek, Liorah; Hengel, Louis van den; Nistelrooij, Inge van; Schippers, Alice (29 December 2024). "Performing Plurality: Meet the Alters Vlogs on YouTube as Breeding Grounds for Epistemic Justice". TMG Journal for Media History. 27 (2): 1–36. doi:10.18146/tmg.896.
- ""Multiple Systems" versus Dissociative Identity Disorder: Life-Style or Mental Illness?" (PDF). Archived (PDF) from the original on 11 November 2014.
- Eve, Zarah (28 May 2024). Exploring emerging multiplicity and psychosocial functioning: a constructivist grounded theory study (doctoral thesis). Manchester Metropolitan University. Archived from the original on 20 September 2025.
- Ribáry, Gergő; Lajtai, László; Demetrovics, Zsolt; Maraz, Aniko (13 June 2017). "Multiplicity: An Explorative Interview Study on Personal Experiences of People with Multiple Selves". Frontiers in Psychology. 8 938. doi:10.3389/fpsyg.2017.00938. ISSN 1664-1078. PMC 5468408. PMID 28659840.
- Yarborough, Eric (2018). Yarbrough, Eric (ed.). Transgender Mental Health | Psychiatry Online. American Psychiatric Association. p. 159. doi:10.1176/appi.books.9781615378944. ISBN 978-1-61537-113-6.
