= Tulpa =

Entity manifesting from mental powers

In traditions of mysticism and the paranormal inspired by Tibetan Buddhism, a tulpa is a materialized being or thought-form, typically in human shape, that is usually created through spiritual practice and intense concentration. The term is borrowed from the Tibetan language. Modern practitioners, who call themselves "tulpamancers", use the term to refer to a type of willed imaginary friend whom practitioners consider sapient and relatively independent. Modern practitioners predominantly consider tulpas a psychological rather than a paranormal phenomenon. The idea became an important belief in theosophy.

== Origins ==
The word tulpa (sprul pa, སྤྲུལ་པ་) originates from Tibetan, where it may mean "phantom" along with other associated meanings. The western understanding of tulpas was developed by European mystical explorers, who interpreted and developed the idea independently of its uses in old Tibet. Hale claimed in a research paper that tulpamancy can be connected to religious prayer because of similar techniques used. Hale also pointed out that replacing "God" with "Tulpa" in the book "When God Talks Back" would be 80% applicable to tulpamancy.

== Theosophy and thought-forms ==
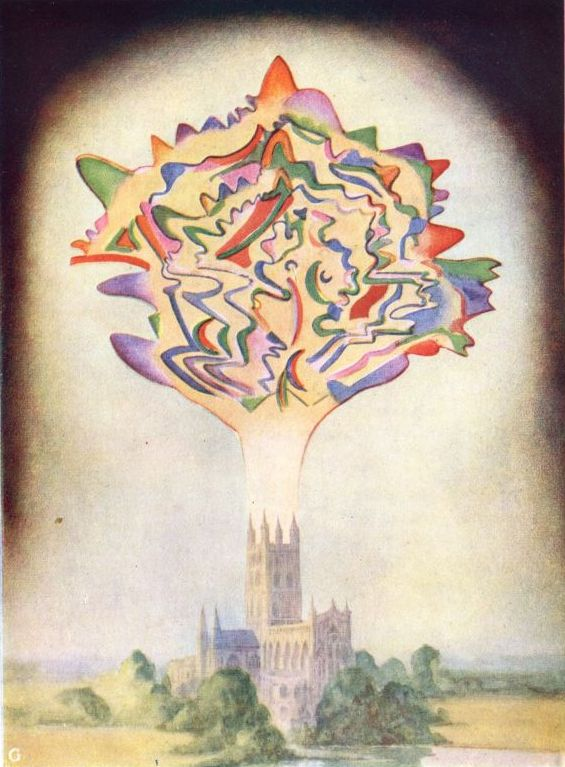
Thoughtform of the Music of Gounod, according to Annie Besant and C. W. Leadbeater in Thought-Forms (1905)

20th-century theosophists associated the Mahayana Buddhist concept of the emanation body (‘tulku’) and the concepts of 'tulpa' and 'thoughtform'. While maintaining a distinction between the terms ‘tulku’ and ‘tulpa’, they simultaneously collapsed the distinctions between a tulpa as a religious emanation, and tulpas as worldly phenomena created by a magician and similar. Their final conception remains distinct from both. In her 1905 book Thought-Forms, the theosophist Annie Besant divides them into three classes: forms in the shape of the person who creates them, forms that resemble objects or people and may become ensouled by nature spirits or by the dead, and forms that represent inherent qualities from the astral or mental planes, such as emotions. The term 'thoughtform' is also used in Evans-Wentz's 1927 translation of the Tibetan Book of the Dead, and in the Western practice of magic. Some have called the Slender Man a tulpa-effect, and attributed it to multiple people's thought processes.

In his book The Human Aura, occultist William Walker Atkinson describes thoughtforms as simple ethereal objects emanating from the auras surrounding people, generated by their thoughts and feelings. In Clairvoyance and Occult Powers, he describes how experienced practitioners of the occult can produce thoughtforms from their auras that serve as astral projections, or as illusions that can only be seen by those with "awakened astral senses".

=== Alexandra David-Néel ===
Spiritualist Alexandra David-Néel said she had observed Buddhist tulpa creation practices in 20th-century Tibet. She called tulpas "magic formations generated by a powerful concentration of thought". David-Néel believed a tulpa could develop a mind of its own: "Once the tulpa is endowed with enough vitality to be capable of playing the part of a real being, it tends to free itself from its maker's control. According to David-Néel, this happens nearly mechanically, just as the child, when her body is completed and able to live apart, leaves its mother's womb." She said she had created such a tulpa in the image of a jolly Friar Tuck-like monk, which she claimed had later developed independent thought and had to be destroyed. David-Néel raised the possibility that her experience was illusory: "I may have created my own hallucination", though she said others could see the thoughtforms that she created.

== Tulpamancers ==
Influenced by depictions in television and cinema from the 1990s and 2000s, the term tulpa started to be used to refer to a type of willed imaginary friend. Practitioners consider tulpas sapient and relatively autonomous. Online communities dedicated to tulpas spawned on the 4chan and Reddit websites, with some spin-offs into Discord. These communities call tulpa practitioners "tulpamancers". The communities gained popularity when adult fans of My Little Pony started discussing tulpas of characters from the television series My Little Pony. The fans attempted to use meditation and lucid dreaming techniques to create imaginary friends. Surveys by Samuel Veissière explored this community's demographic, social, and psychological profiles. These practitioners believe a tulpa is a "real or somewhat-real person". The number of active participants in these online communities is in the low hundreds per community, and few known meetings in person have taken place. They belong to "primarily urban, middle-class, Euro-American adolescent and young adult demographics" and "most ... cite loneliness and social anxiety as an incentive to pick up the practice". 93.7% of respondents said their involvement with the creation of tulpas had "made their [mental] condition better" and led to new, unusual sensory experiences. Some practitioners have sexual and romantic interactions with their tulpas, though the practice is controversial and typically regarded as taboo. One survey found that 8.5% support a metaphysical explanation of tulpas, 76.5% support a neurological or psychological explanation, and 14% "other" explanations.

Practitioners believe tulpas are able to communicate with their host in ways they sense do not originate from their own thoughts. Some practitioners report experiencing hallucinations of their tulpas. Practitioners that have hallucinations report being able to see, hear and touch their tulpas.

Veissière's survey of 141 respondents found that the rates of neurodivergence including autism and attention deficit hyperactivity disorder (ADHD) was significantly higher among the surveyed tulpamancers than in the general population. He speculates that these people may be more likely to want to make a tulpa because they have a higher level of loneliness. Tulpamancers were typically white, articulate, imaginative, and lived in urban areas. A 2022 study found people who did not have psychosis and experienced more than one unusual sensory phenomenon (in this instance autonomous sensory meridian response (ASMR) and tulpamancy) were more prone to hallucination than people who experienced only one of the two sensory phenomena.

Somer et al. (2021) describe the Internet tulpamancer subculture as being used to "overcome loneliness and mental suffering", and noted the close association with reality shifting (RS), a way of deliberately inducing a form of self-hypnosis to escape from reality into a pre-planned desired reality or "wonderland" of chosen fantasy characters.

Tulpamancers and their tulpas typically regard themselves as Plural, and the two communities share significant overlap.

== See also ==
- Alter ego
- Bicameral mentality
- Doppelgänger
- Egregore
- Etiäinen
- Golem
- Guardian angel
- Homunculus
- Plurality (identity)
- Rebirth (Buddhism)
- Reincarnation
- Takwin
- Thoughtography
- The Circular Ruins
- Á Bao A Qu
