= Reality shifting =

Self-induced belief in consciousness transfer to alternate realities

This symbol is often used to represent reality shifting in its virtual communities.

Reality shifting, also known as RS or shifting, is a cognitive activity and guided imagination practice in which practitioners attempt to transfer their awareness to alternate realities through meditation and focus. The universes targeted are often the pre-existing worlds of popular fiction, such as the Harry Potter universe or Marvel Universe.

From a scientific standpoint, it is not possible to shift one's consciousness to alternate realities, and reality shifting is therefore generally viewed as a personal experience rather than an objective manipulation of reality. There is concern among experts about reality shifting's impacts on people with pre-existing mental health conditions.

Reality shifting became a trend on social media in mid-2020, during the COVID-19 pandemic. This was likely sparked by the sudden increase in social isolation and resulting stress. The practice is related to the New Thought movement, a new religious movement; one of its principles is that the mind can manipulate the physical world almost without limit.

== Overview ==
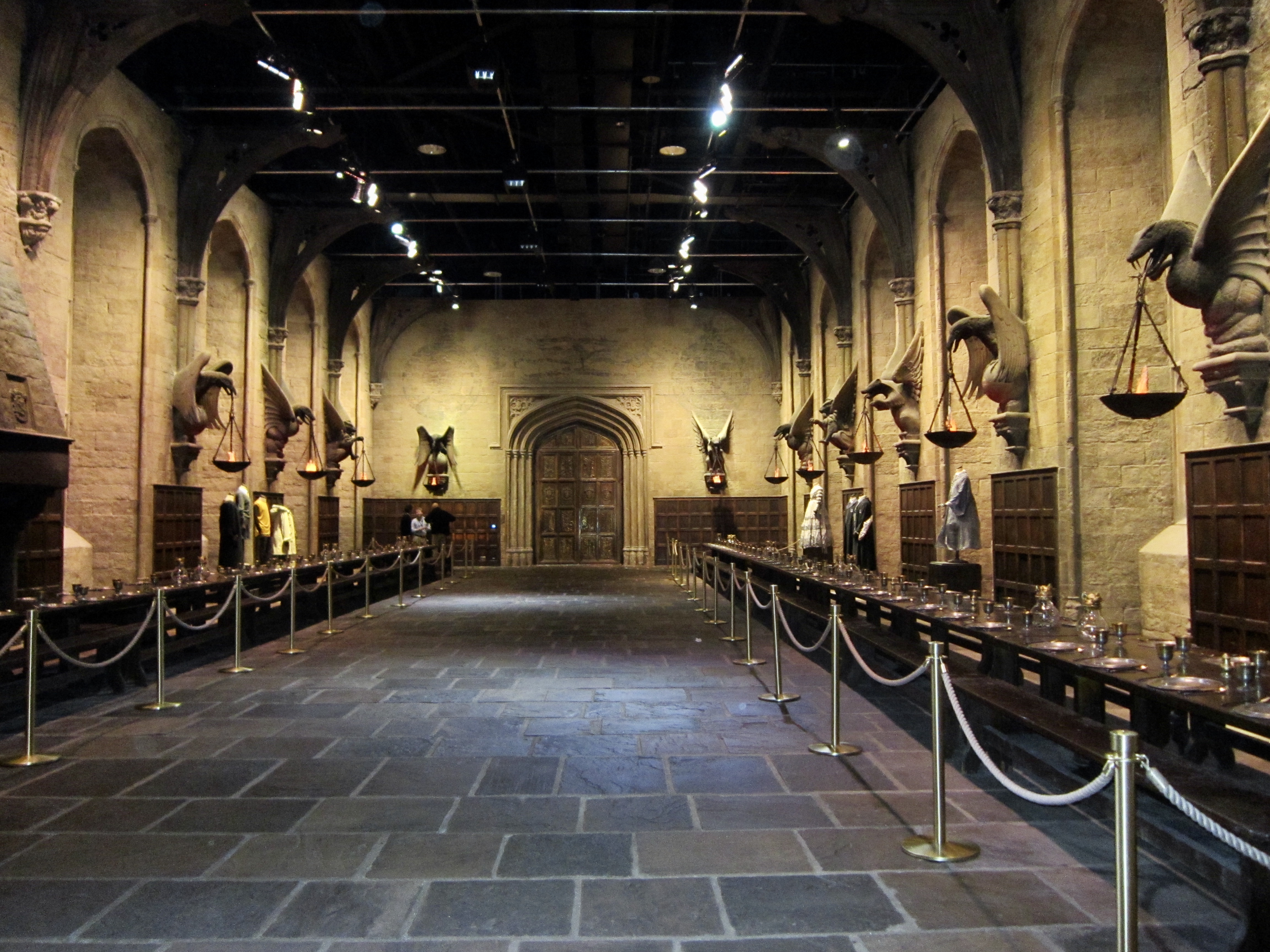
People engaging in reality shifting often attempt to shift to fictional places, such as Harry Potter's Hogwarts.

Shifting generally includes aspects such as concentration and meditation, and is performed with the explicit goal of shifting one's awareness to a specific alternate universe. This distinguishes it from similar phenomena such as lucid dreaming, tulpamancy, and self-hypnosis. The desired reality may be invented by the individual, but is commonly the universe of a popular work or series. Prominent examples include the Harry Potter universe, the Marvel Universe, the Shadowhunters world, the universe of Star Wars, the science fiction series Avatar, and the worlds of various anime and manga such as My Hero Academia.

Various induction techniques are employed to assist in reality shifting. For example, the "Alice in Wonderland" method involves visualizing oneself to be falling down a rabbit hole into the desired universe. Similarly, the "elevator" method requires one to imagine oneself riding an elevator up a series of floors, intensifying one's "energy levels" until the top floor is reached and the elevator opens into the target reality. The "raven" method involves lying on one's back and counting to one hundred while focusing on what one plans to do in one's new reality.

Shifters have formed various virtual communities on social media platforms like Reddit and TikTok. Members discuss their shifts to alternate universes and share tips and tutorials on how to enhance their experience, such as through "scripting" the shift to better control the storyline, or listening to "subliminal" music.

Most practitioners are teenagers and young adults. Interests in reality shifting tend to overlap with interests in parts of modern spirituality such as tarot cards, astrology, and manifestation.

== Health concerns ==
Reality shifting has not been researched enough to directly connect it to mental health disorders. Little empirical research has been conducted on the subject; a 2026 study on reality shifting communities noted that they were "gatekept, in fear of 'pathologizing' the phenomenon." According to Joshua Klapow, a clinical psychologist, "The practice of reality shifting is not inherently unhealthy. However, if a person is using it increasingly more and more to escape their present life, concern arises." Especially within the online community, reality shifting can be reified as an actual transition to another universe. Business Insider reported on the experience of several shifters, who claimed that shifting became an obsession for them and interfered with their daily life.

"Respawning" is a term for a radical escapist technique, encouraged by a fringe community within the larger shifting community. The user attempts to permanently move one's awareness to the desired reality, either by leaving behind a "clone" or "stand in" to continue to operate their body, or by inducing a physical death. On YouTube, several videos published were designed to incite a heart attack or similar "natural death" in viewers so they might respawn. Though some users commented that they felt symptoms, it is not scientifically plausible that these videos induce medical emergencies.

Reality shifting, alongside The Backrooms horror media and other social media and pop culture influences, was linked to a sudden onset of tics in a 15-year-old girl in Slovakia.

== See also ==
- Autosuggestion
- Astral projection
- Hypnosis
- Remote viewing
