= Narrative identity =

Psychological theory

In psychology, the theory of narrative identity, also known as self-narrative, postulates that individuals form an identity by integrating their life experiences into an internalized, evolving story of the self that provides the individual with a sense of unity and purpose in life. This life narrative integrates one's reconstructed past, perceived present, and imagined future. Furthermore, this narrative is a story – it has characters, episodes, imagery, a setting, plots, and themes and often follows the traditional model of a story, having a beginning (initiating event), middle (an attempt and a consequence), and an end (denouement).

In recent decades, a proliferation of psychological research on narrative identity has provided a strong empirical basis for the construct, cutting across the field, including personality psychology, social psychology, developmental and life-span psychology, cognitive psychology, cultural psychology, and clinical and counseling psychology.

== Context ==
=== Development ===
Development of narrative identity in childhood is largely influenced by opportunities for narrative expression through conversations with caregivers and friends. Young children whose parents share more detailed personal narratives from their own lives tend to have more detailed and coherent personal narratives themselves by the end of the preschool age period. In addition, young children whose parents or caregivers engage in more elaborative reminiscing techniques with them (such as asking open-ended questions or including emotional information) when co-constructing stories about past events tend to tell more coherent stories in both childhood and adolescence. Talking to attentive listeners is also important to childhood development of narrative identity as speakers provide more accurate autobiographical information when speaking to attentive listeners as opposed to distracted listeners, therefore developing more specific autobiographical memories which give rise to richer personal narratives.

The capability to independently construct narratives for a life story framework and form an identity emerges in adolescence. This aligns with Erikson's stages of psychosocial development, which posits that the central developmental task during adolescence is to establish an individual identity. The development of life story narratives in adolescence is facilitated by co-constructed reminiscing, in which caregivers use discussion, comparison, and analysis of inner motivation to guide reflection about past events and create narratives that explain situations and behavior. This helps adolescents develop an understanding of the relationship between the "self" of the past and their personal narrative in the present. This is achieved through autobiographical reasoning which uses (auto-)biographical arguments to relate distant parts of life to each other and to the development of the narrator's self, thereby contributing to life narrative coherence. Establishing a life story plays a vital role in adulthood by supporting generativity, and it helps to foster meaning-making at the end of life.

Entire life narratives and single event stories tend to increase in coherence and meaning-making over the course of adolescence. When a child, especially a boy, makes stronger semantic connections in early adolescence, he has a worse sense of well-being, but as he moves to late adolescence his well-being increases. The large jump in cognitive learning during adolescence allows this change to take place. Since this is a very important time for children to expand their social groups and conversational constructs, more semantic narratives can be created and allow the meaning making construct to develop.

=== Personality psychology ===
A person's narrative identity is a layer of personality related to, but distinct from the broad dispositional traits (The Big Five) and contextualized characteristic adaptations, described in Dan P. McAdams's three-level framework. Dispositional traits, drawn from the Five-Factor Model of personality are broad, decontextualized descriptors that are relatively stable across the lifespan and are useful for drawing comparisons between individuals. Characteristic adaptations encompass a person's motivations, developmental concerns, and life strategies and are used to describe the individual within their contextualized time, place, and social roles. Narrative identity, the third level in McAdams' framework, encompasses the internalized, evolving story of the self. It is argued that assessing all three levels simultaneously gives you a personological description of the whole person.

Different ways of interpreting and narrating life changes correlate with different forms of personality development. Because of the close linkage between narrative identity and psychological well-being, a common research focus in narrative identity is in exploring the relationship between characteristics of narratives and how they relate to personality development in the domains of ego development and psychological well-being. Individuals who place a high importance on understanding new viewpoints show higher scores in ego development, and those that placed importance on interpersonal relationships, joy and societal contribution tend to have higher scores on well-being.

=== Epistemology ===
Narrative can be approached through one of two epistemological paradigms: hermeneutic (also called "narrative"), or paradigmatic. The hermeneutic approach seeks to capture the specific, personal, and highly contextualized elements of an individual's story. The paradigmatic approach, on the other hand, tries to classify narratives, determine associations, draw cause-and-effect relationships, and test and validate hypotheses - to transcend the particulars that the hermeneutic approach primarily concerned with, to generate generalizable scientific findings.

== Components of identity narratives ==
Life narratives are often examined and evaluated by the presence and extent to which they contain various structural and thematic components.

=== Structure ===
Coherence is one of the primary structural elements of narratives. As individuals develop from children to adults, four types of coherence emerge in their abilities to tell stories:

- Temporal coherence: the telling of a story in a clear, chronological way, i.e. event B follows event A.
- Causal coherence: drawing cause-and-effect relationships between events in the narrative and also between events and their effect on the narrator's sense of self.
- Thematic coherence: the narrator making a reflective evaluation of their story, revealing themes, overarching trends, and creating meaning from the narrative.
- The cultural concept of biography: the story assuming the format and prose common to the narrator's culture and context.

Some amount of coherence is always necessary in a narrative, otherwise it will be incomprehensible, while too much coherence may make the narrative hard to believe, as though it too-neatly ties together the complexity of life. The general extent to which coherence is present or absent in a narrative has been found to be related to a variety of important outcomes such as overall psychological well-being and the nuance and complexity of meaning-making processes (ego development).

=== Content ===
Turning to content, research on narrative identity has focused especially on the thematic elements of personal narratives. When participants in research studies are asked to recount a personal narrative, researchers code the story on the following seven constructs: redemption, contamination, agency, communion, exploratory narrative processing, coherent positive resolution, and meaning making. An additional construct named performance has been newly recognized and also included in some researchers coding.

- Redemption: the narrator transitions from a generally "bad"/negative state, to a generally "good"/positive state (A → B). Such a transition can be characterized as being a sacrifice (enduring a negative event A to get the benefit of B), recovery (attaining a positive state after losing it), growth (bettering the self psychologically, physically, personally), or learning (gaining/mastering new skills, knowledge, wisdom).
- Contamination: the narrator transitions from a generally good/positive state, to a bad/negative state (B → A). Often, this transition is marked by a denial or not being able to remember the 'good' of the state before - it has been overwhelmed by the current 'bad' state. Common sub-themes in contamination include victimization, betrayal, loss, failure, illness/injury, disappointment, or disillusionment.
- Agency: refers to the extent to which the narrator is autonomous, and has the power to affect his/her own life. Agency is sometimes broken down into four pathways: self-mastery (the protagonist masters, enlarges, or betters the self), status/victory (the protagonist attains a heightened status or prestige amongst their peers), achievement/responsibility (the protagonist has significant achievement in some task, job, or goal), and empowerment (the protagonist is made better through an interaction with something larger and greater than the self).
- Communion: the narrator is motivated to form intimate friendships/relationships; showing intimacy, sharing, belonging, affiliation, etc. Common themes in communion are: love/friendship, reciprocal and noninstrumental dialogue, providence of caring/help to another, or a general feeling of unity/togetherness with the world/others.
- Exploratory narrative processing: the extent that the narrator engages in self-exploration while telling a story; a high score suggests profound self-exploration and/or a deep understanding of oneself. The practice of exploratory narrative processing in times of struggle is one avenue through which maturity develops, and narratives of positive self-transformation are often characterized by increased exploratory narrative processing.
- Coherent positive resolution: the extent to which tensions dissolve, providing closure and a satisfying ending to a narrative. Increased coherent positive resolution in narratives correlate with improvements in ego-resiliency, or one's adaptability under stress.
- Meaning-making: the extent to which the narrator gleans meaning from a narrative. Scores on responses range from low (no meaning; narrator simply recounts story), moderate (extracting a concrete lesson from the story—for example: do not put hands on hot surfaces), to high (gaining a deep insight from the narrative—for example: learning that you can't judge a book by its cover).
- Performance: The narrator describes life stories around the outcome of their performance. This narrative tends to be seen typically among elite athletes. It can be considered a very dominant narrative since it is very accepted within the athletic community.

== Research in narrative constructs ==
The constructs mentioned above can vary in a narrative depending on the characteristics of the narrator and the circumstances of the story. Research on construct variance is conducted by having participants tell a story that is scored for some number of the eight narrative constructs.

=== Individual characteristics ===
The characteristics of a narrative can vary depending on age: during the adolescent years, narrative sophistication increases with age. For example, in one psychological study, adolescents aged 14 to 18 wrote narratives about significant turning points in their lifetimes. The researchers coded the narratives for meaning making. The results showed that age was positively correlated with meaning making scores. This suggests that the capability to incorporate meaning in life stories develops over the course of adolescence. Across the lifespan, the mean valence or positivity of life narratives varies with age with a low in early adolescence, as do themes of agency and communion and the significant others mentioned.

The characteristics of a narrative can also vary depending on generativity (the degree to which an individual wishes to improve society and help future generations) and optimism. For example, in one study, participants narrated personally meaningful events from their pasts; these could be positive, negative turning point, or early childhood memories. Research participants with high generativity and optimism scores tended to have high narrative redemption scores.

Differences in identity status also correlate with differences in narrative characteristics. The identity status theory of identity development examines an individual's exploration of identities and his or her commitment to an identity. There are four identity statuses: identity achievement (the most adjusted status and an integration of exploration and commitment), moratorium (exploration with no commitment), foreclosure (commitment with no exploration), and diffusion (no commitment or exploration). The foreclosure and diffusion identity statuses are the least developmentally advanced. In addition, they are associated with lower meaning making scores than achievement and moratorium.

Personal experience narrative is the very thread that identity is crafted from. During the storytelling process what people say, how they say it, and especially if they keep saying it, determines who they are and where they stand. The words you use, or diction, situates you in a social group. Voicing and ventriloquation of past selves positioned against current self or others yields a trajectory of narrative and an evaluative tool of the construction of self-identity. Represented content and enacted positioning, therefore, can interrelate in two ways so as to construct the self. Past voices can lie on trajectory towards the storytelling self, or map out and organize the present self. Along with creating a coherent sense of identity, this helps build empathy between speaker and audience, which deepens the connection of the speaker's own self-identity. One cannot become a 'self' alone, and thus the audience is vital to the creation of self through the positioning and arranging of past and current selves.

=== Circumstances of the story ===
The narrative constructs of a story can also depend on its plot. For example, the emotionality of a plot affects the characteristics of a story. In one study, 168 adolescents each recounted three self-defining narratives. Narratives containing negative and/or conflicting emotions receive higher meaning making scores than narratives containing positive or neutral emotions.

Narrative themes can also depend on the event type. Different event types have varying levels of tension, and researchers posit that tension level is associated with narrative construct scores. For example, a mortality (or life-threatening) event would have a higher tension level than a leisure (i.e. vacation) event. Mortality narratives also receive higher meaning making scores than leisure narratives. Achievement (i.e. winning an award) and relationship events are posited to have mixed tension levels; for example, in relationship events, an interpersonal conflict would contain more emotional tension than falling in love. Achievement and relationship narratives also have varying meaning making scores.

=== Implications ===
The use of narrative constructs is associated with well-being: people who incorporate negative life events into their narrative identities as instances of redemption tend to have higher instances of levels of happiness and well-being. For example, high school seniors who were able to find a positive outcome from a negative adolescent experience (redemption) had higher levels of well-being than students who could not find a silver lining.

Much of the research on narrative constructs has not established causation: researchers do not know whether well-being causes redemption sequences in narratives, or whether redemption sequences cause well-being. Also, researchers do not know whether tension in a narrative causes meaning making, or whether meaning making leads to tension. Psychologists will need to determine causation before these findings can be practically implemented, such as in psychotherapy.

== Autobiographical memory ==
The formation and organization of memories is the central mechanism through which narrative identity is constructed. The life story allows individuals to organize recollective memories and more abstract knowledge of their past into a coherent biographical view. Different types of memories have been identified and classified, and have unique influences on how individuals develop their narrative self. Just as autobiographical memories influence personal narratives, these narratives also influence memories - For instance, narrative expression is critical for the development of a sense of agency in autobiographical memories.

The opportunity to tell stories about their lives can help autobiographical narrators establish a coherent sense of who they are. Charlotte Linde's definition of personal experience narrative is quintessential to the idea of narrative identity and is evidence into how these stories and the process of telling them craft the framework for one's own identity. Personal narrative is a powerful tool for creating, negotiating and displaying the moral standing of the self. The self has to be related to something, in this case an audience, but must also be related properly. Personal experience narrative culminates the discontinuity between inner experience and the portrayed self. The often hidden purpose of narratives as a social process is to show that the narrator knows what the norms are and agree with them, or depending on the audience, disagree with them. The very act of narrating creates the occasion for self-regard and editing. "The nature of the process of narration contributes to the creation of this reflexivity, because one can never immediately speak the present in the present. This necessarily creates a distinction between the narrator and the protagonist of the narrative, and interposes a distance between them. Consequently, the narrator can observe, reflect, adjust the amount of distance, and correct the self that is being created." Thus, temporal continuity- or identity of the self through time- is the most basic form of coherence we can create.

Narrative identity is mainly concerned with autobiographical memories and often are influenced by the meaning and emotions the individual has assigned to that event. These memories perform a self-representative function by using personal memories to create and maintain a coherent self-identity, or narrative identity, over time. Autobiographical memories that have to do with important goals within a certain period of life and correspond with the concerns of the present self have been termed "self-defining memories", and are especially important in narrative identity formation. When these memories contain recurring emotion-outcome sequences (see: content), together they give rise to "narrative scripts." Development of a narrative identity that promotes psychological well-being requires combining autobiographical memory specificity, the ability to recall self-defining memories of specific instances in your past, with the narrative construct of meaning-making to attain insight from the narrative script.

== Storytelling process ==
Beyond the content of people's stories, the storytelling process is essential to understanding narrative identity. The purpose of stories, the role of the listener, and storytelling patterns all influence the way stories are told, and thus narrative identity.

Richard Bauman states that different forms of conversational genres (personal experience narrative, tall tale, practical joke), interrelatedly, add texture and flavor to one's life. The formats of the stories that we tell reveal truths about our own personal identity. Together, they provide the narrator with a toolset of means to figure him/ herself in a variety of alignments to a remarkably consistent and coherent set of epistemological and social-relational concerns.

Bluck has conceptualized several reasons people tell narratives. One reason is for directive purposes, which involves transmitting information regarding the future. Additionally, stories are told for social reasons, in particular communication, persuasion, and entertainment purposes. Finally, narrators can benefit by expressing themselves, in addition to giving life purpose and meaning.

Listeners also possess power over the process of storytelling, and therefore the outcome of narrative identity. For instance, listener attentiveness elicits from the narrator more coherent stories, punchy endings, dynamic arcs over the course of the story, and overall, more specific and engaging stories. Themes in narratives can influence the listener's attitude toward the storyteller. For example, contamination sequences in bereavement narratives tend to elicit sympathy, while redemption sequences make the listener feel more comfortable and accepting of the narrator. Both positive moods and the act of telling the story can influence the narrator's relationship with the listener - and lead to more intimate sharing by the narrator.

Storytelling patterns may also impact an individual's narrative identity. - for instance, untold experiences are more likely to be forgotten and considered less important. Research has shown that 90% of emotional experiences are disclosed within a few days of the event, and 62% of the "most memorable events of the day" are told by end of that day. Those events that get forgotten cannot be included in the narrator's story of the self, and therefore cannot play a role in their identity.

Researchers focus on the storytelling process participants use in order to code the content the participants are showing. If a participant explains he or she participated in a sport not because he particularly liked it but because he could win, researchers would say he is using performance content to narrate his life. Storytelling is a very important piece to the methodology of narrative research for it provides variables the researchers can assess.

== Applications of narrative methods ==
The concept of narrative identity, and its associated research techniques have been applied in a wide variety of fields. Below are just a few examples:

=== Gay and lesbian identity ===
Narrative identity has been studied as it impacts the lives of lesbian and gay individuals. Specifically, the concept of master narratives (story scripts common within a cultural context) has been investigated in this domain. Studies have found that gay identity is often shaped by master narratives of gay identity in American culture, which have evolved over recent history. One of the foundational papers asserts that a study of gay identity must take into account cultural and historical factors. The paper demonstrates that gay-identified individuals must navigate through a world where master narratives exclude their desires and experiences.

=== Psychotherapy ===
Empirical research has demonstrated that narrative identity changes over the course of psychotherapy. This change has been associated with improvements in clients' mental health. A prospective longitudinal study tracked clients' narrative identity from before they began treatment through the early phase of psychotherapy. The study demonstrated that clients told stories about their experiences with an increasing sense of agency over the course of treatment. This increase in the theme of agency was associated with improvements in psychological health. Analyses revealed that changes in clients' stories occurred before changes in their psychological health. This finding suggests that narrative change may precede changes in mental health.

=== Education ===
Narration is a meaningful learning structure, which improves the educative process, and guides the student to develop a strong and healthy identity. Since identity is essential for psychological development and teachers should find ways to help students to get a complete human growth, to work on narrative eases the student to obtain a deep knowledge, useful for class and life

=== Schizophrenia ===
Narratives written by individuals with severe mental illnesses, such as schizophrenia, have been studied in order to determine the potential influence of treatment using therapy and/or antipsychotic medication on narrative formation. Studies have demonstrated that patients with schizophrenia develop more complex and dynamic narratives, but that the content of the narratives do not change a great deal over the course of treatment. Other studies have indicated that people with schizophrenia are better able to confront their illness after time spent in therapy, and subsequently develop more coherent narratives. These findings provide more insight into this disorder, and suggest new, more effective methods of treatment.

=== Prisoners ===
Narrative identity has been explored in the stories of incarcerated individuals. For example, narratives have been used to understand the conversion experience among prisoners. Through these narratives, prisoner converts have been able to integrate their negative self (the one who committed the crime) into their larger sense of self. They have also been able to exert control over their seemingly uncontrollable life while in prison. Narratives have also been used to study the conversion stories of incarcerated women. For these women, imprisonment causes dissonance between a conflict-self and a respectable identity. Conversion narratives help free women to reclaim their identities and sense of self-worth.

=== Medical practice ===
Medical practice that embraces the importance of stories exchanged in the medical context has been termed "narrative medicine". Narrative medicine allows for more effective care by physicians and more comfort for patients by providing new ways to consider the relationships and practices involved in medicine. Some of these relationships include those between the physician and patient, physician and self, physician and colleagues, and physician and society. This form of practice allows patients to overcome their loss of identity and benefit their recovery process. Physicians help the patients find new connections between their narrative stories and identity for the patients to find different options and outlooks on their recovery. With new connections, the patient can lead a healthier life with a positive outlook instead of revolving their lives around their illness.

=== Athletes ===
When assessing an athlete it is beneficial to understand how one describes their life since it can determine how mentally healthy they are. If there is a strong athletic identity, like the performance narrative, sometimes severe psychological problems can form when the athlete is in a slump or injured. Observing an athlete's narrative can help one shift their attention away from only the performance narrative but combine it with others. One can reach the elite level of athletes without only focusing on the performance script. Some actually attempt to follow the script but it does not help them succeed due to the clash of the cultural norm and what is desired by the athlete.

== See also ==
- Internarrative identity
- Memory
- Personality psychology
- Myth
- Self
