= Meditations on the Tarot =

Esoteric Christian book

Meditations on the Tarot: A Journey into Christian Hermeticism
- 2005 edition published by Penguin Group
- Author: Anonymous (later verified as Valentin Tomberg)
- Original title: Méditations sur les 22 arcanes majeurs du Tarot
- Translator: Robert A. Powell
- Language: French
- Publisher: Éditions Aubier-Montaigne (French edition); Amity House; Penguin Group; Angelico Press (English edition)
- Publication date: 1980
- Publication place: France
- English publication date: 1985
- Pages: 774 (first French edition); 658 (first English edition)
- ISBN: 9782700702088

Meditations on the Tarot: A Journey into Christian Hermeticism (French: Méditations sur les 22 arcanes majeurs du Tarot) is an esoteric Christian book by Valentin Tomberg and published posthumously and anonymously in 1980. The afterword written by Hans Urs von Balthasar states that "The author wished to remain anonymous in order to allow the work to speak for itself, to avoid the interposition of any kind of personal element between the work and the reader - reasons that we respect." This was followed by translation into German (Die großen Arcana des Tarot : Meditationen, ISBN 978-3906371054). An English translation was then published in 1985, with Robert A. Powell basing his rendering on the author's original French manuscript, whereas the published French edition (ISBN 978-2700703696) does not always follow the extant French original manuscript.
