= Furry pornography =

Pornography of anthropomorphic animal characters

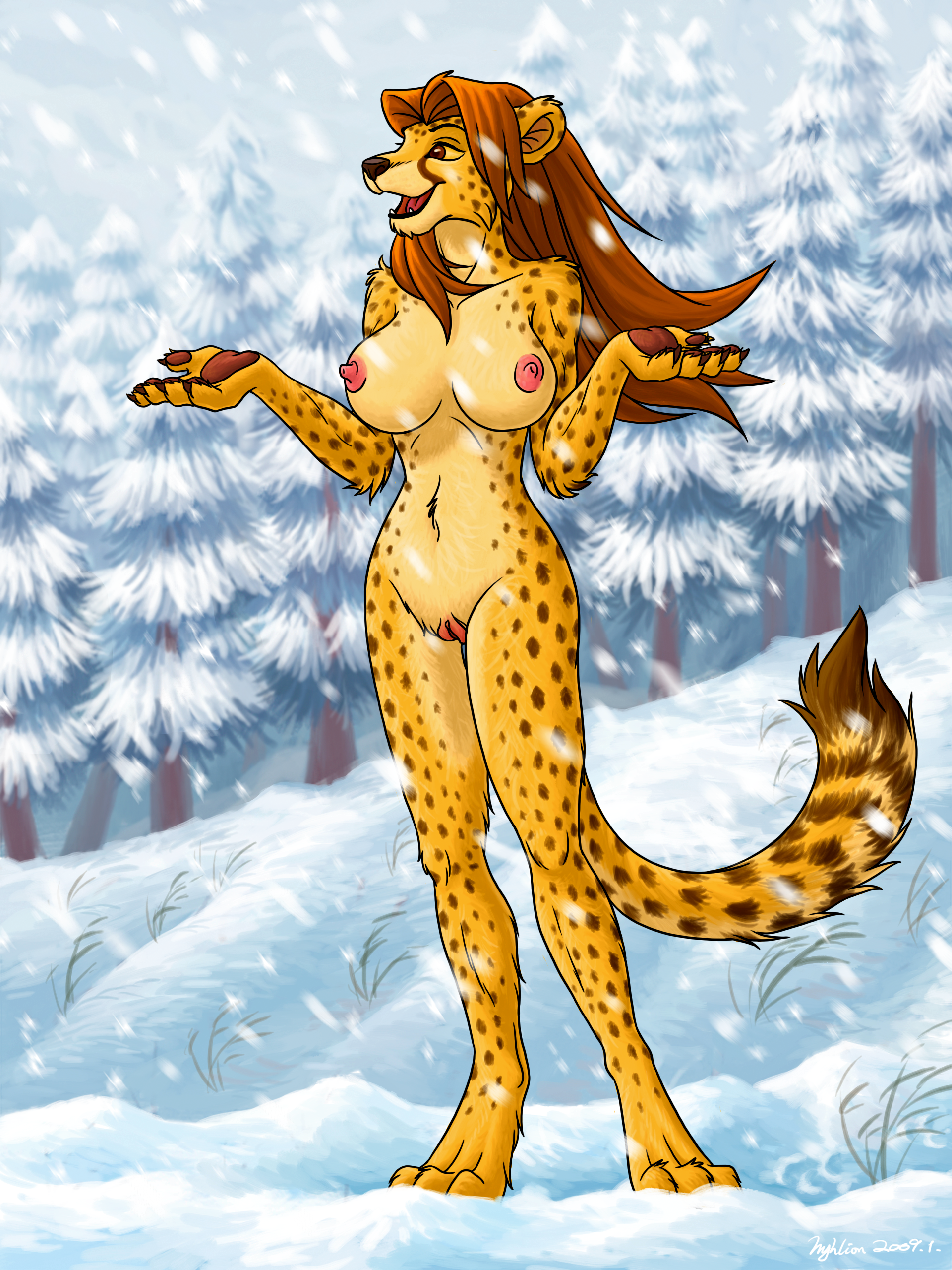
An example of sexually suggestive furry artwork, of an anthropomorphic cheetah depicting naturism

Furry pornography refers to a genre of pornography or erotic material depicting anthropomorphic animal characters engaging in lascivious behavior or sexual intercourse, commonly associated with the furry fandom. Such material may include visual art, animation, literature, and video games. While some material depicts original characters, other consists of erotic art of fan art, fan fiction, fan film, fan games, and other forms of fan labor.

The older term yiff describes sexual activity or pornographic content involving these characters. Such content is distributed on imageboards and other online platforms, and may also be produced using traditional digital art or with generative AI tools to create generative AI pornography.

Furry conventions usually have strict policies regulating where furry pornography can be displayed or sold. Yiff has also been used as a pejorative by critics of the fandom, such as in the phrase "yiff in hell". Additionally, the term is also used in the plushie fetish community. Animal roleplay such as HuCow or pup play relates to a fetishism that is not necessarily connected to furry pornography or the furry fandom. Furry pornography involves fictional anthropomorphic characters rather than real animals, and is distinguished from zoophilia or bestiality.

== History ==
=== Background ===
Fictional characters in fan culture predate the current furry fandom by decades, and sexual and mythical portrayals of people, animals, and anthropomorphic beings have existed for centuries. Classical mythology in culture and works discussing sexuality in ancient Rome included stories of bestiality, such as Leda and the Swan and the birth of the Minotaur from Pasiphaë's mating with a bull. Other historical examples of bestiality include, the 19th-century Kinoe no Komatsu, Japanese shunga erotica work of The Dream of the Fisherman's Wife which depicts tentacle erotica.

As early as the 1920s, erotic mini-comics known as Tijuana bibles depicted fictional figures. In fan culture, slash fiction is a genre of fan fiction centered on romantic or sexual relationships between same-sex characters. Works involving characters from Star Trek, particularly Kirk/Spock, circulated among fans as early as the 1970s. Many of these works drew inspiration from the 1967 Star Trek episode "Amok Time", which introduced the Vulcan mating cycle known as pon farr in which Vulcan males must mate or die. Similar concepts appeared in Ursula K. Le Guin's 1969 novel The Left Hand of Darkness, which depicted an extraterrestrial androgynous society with hermaphroditic characters.

By the 2000s, the internet adage "Rule 34" was created, claiming that anything that exists will have pornographic content of it. The otherkin culture developed primarily as an online community in the 1990s. Therian subculture (or therianthropes) are individuals who identify as, in a psychological or spiritual sense, one or more nonhuman animals. They also identified furries who saw themselves as "other than human", or who desired to become more like the furry species which they identified with. They suggested that this identification as "less than human" could be considered parallel to gender identity disorder (reclassified in 2013 as gender dysphoria), and described it using the term "species identity disorder". Several issues with this particular comparison made in the study were raised in 2011, mainly focusing on the controversial nature of gender identity disorder as a diagnosis and the means by which Gerbasi and colleagues drew conclusions about these subjects. The term "species identity disorder" is now more closely associated with therians or otherkin. Animal-transformation themes, such as werewolves and other shapeshifting human-animal hybrids, also appeared in franchises such as Buffy the Vampire Slayer, Twilight, Teen Wolf, and Harry Potter promoted ideas surrounding the speculative erotic fiction known as the omegaverse.

In related fandom spaces, including the My Little Pony franchise (especially My Little Pony: Friendship Is Magic and My Little Pony: Equestria Girls), erotic fan art known as clop developed within segments of the brony fandom (the adult fandom of Friendship Is Magic that emerged on the Internet in the early 2010s). The 2014 reality television show Sexy Beasts is a dating game show where contestants are made to resemble animals through prosthetic makeup. BookTok is a subcommunity on the TikTok social media platform that emerged in the late 2010s and focuses on books and literature. Within it, some discuss romance novels and erotic literature depicting monsters and monster girls, themes associated with teratophilia, or sexual attraction to monsters, often referred to as monster erotica or "Monster-Fucker" media. A 2024 article by The Guardian discussed the growing popularity of erotica and Omegaverse fiction described broader cultural shifts. More broadly, commentators have noted changing attitudes toward erotic media, with increasing visibility of niche genres and online communities in mainstream discourse.

Fans of furry pornography commonly distinguish it from zoophilia or bestiality, emphasizing that their interest is toward fictional characters depicted as sapient beings with human-like traits rather than real animals.

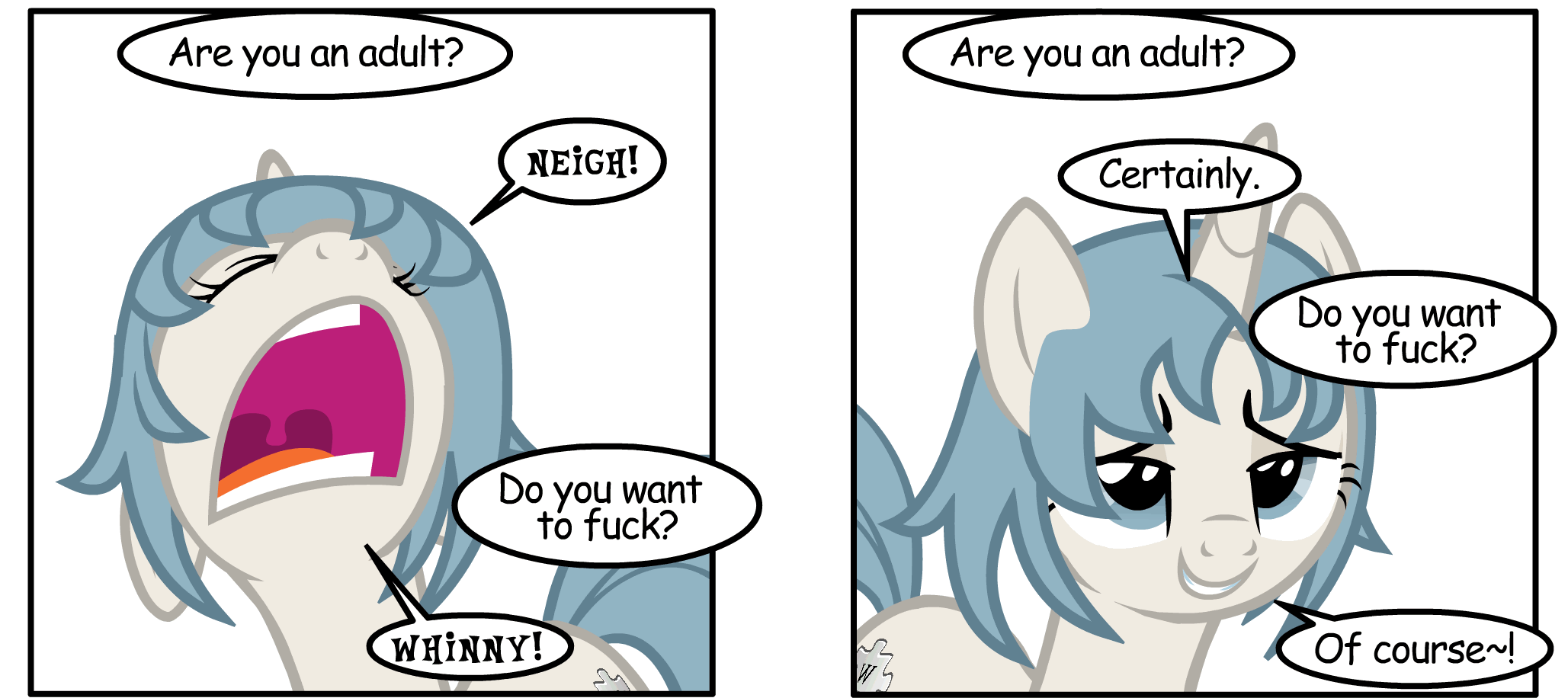
A ponified (ponysona) version of Wikipe-tan referencing the Harkness Test's emphasis on obtaining consent before engaging in sexual activity with animal-like characters

The Harkness Test is a set of criteria used in online communities to evaluate the ethical implications of fictosexuality relationships. The test is named after Captain Jack Harkness, a fictional character from the television series Doctor Who. The idea originated as an infographic posted on Fur Affinity in 2013, later circulating through platforms such as Derpibooru, Reddit, and Tumblr. It was later defined on Urban Dictionary in 2019. Nijikon refers to attraction toward fictional characters, particularly in media such as anime and manga (including hentai), while a fictional character to whom one feels attraction is sometimes referred to as a "waifu". Related online fandom phenomena include the "Tumblr Sexyman", a fictional character popularized online as a sex symbol.

== Genres ==
Example of feral art

Genres of furry pornography often incorporate fetishism and sexual kinks through anthropomorphic animal characters ("fursonas"). Common depictions include muscle worship, adipophilia ("thicc"), and species commonly associated with the furry fandom such as foxes, wolves, dogs, and cats, as well as mythical creatures including dragons, kumiho (kitsune). Some works depict "feral" characters, which are non-anthropomorphic animals portrayed with no human traits, typically represented as four-legged and animalistic rather than upright or speaking; feral art is contentious within the fandom. "Cub" pornography involves young or young-looking characters, similar to lolicon and shotacon, and is highly controversial.

Transformation ("TF") pornography depicts fursonas or humans changing into animals or other species, while hybrid characters combine traits from multiple species. Other themes include size-difference fantasies associated with macrophilia, body inflation, and "Mpreg" (male pregnancy), as well as BDSM dynamics. Related forms of roleplay, such as pet play, are not necessarily associated with the furry fandom.

Certain fictional characters have become widely recognized as subjects of sexualized fan content, including Lola Bunny from Looney Tunes who is regarded as an animated sex symbol, Robin Hood's depiction of Maid Marian, and others such as Tony the Tiger, who has been the subject of sexualized fan content.

Characters from My Little Pony: Friendship Is Magic are often featured in My Little Pony erotic fan art, often referred to as clop. Similar patterns appear in other fandoms, including characters like Judy Hopps and Nick Wilde from Zootopia. Fans of the Sonic the Hedgehog fandom have occasionally drawn fetish art of Sonic from Sonic the Hedgehog media franchise. Pokémon is also often the subject of erotic fan art, with some popularly sexualized characters being Lucario, Lopunny, Eevee's evolutions (especially Vaporeon), Meowscarada, and Gardevoir.

== Etymology and terminology ==
The word yiff originated as an onomatopoetic word in a constructed language known as Foxish. The word is derived from the sound of foxes mating. Foxish was created in 1990 by the user littlefox on an online, text-based role-playing game called FurryMUCK. Initially, the term conveyed a non-sexual, positive exclamation. Another word in the Foxish language that did have sexual connotation was yipp.

Pronunciation of the term "Yiff"

The CSI episode "Fur and Loathing", which aired on October 30, 2003, increased awareness of the term outside of the furry fandom while misrepresenting and inadvertently contributing to the negative stigma commonly associated with the furry fandom. The word yiff became mainstream later that decade from anti-furry rhetoric on sites like 4chan.

According to Google Trends, Google searches for the term were more prevalent during the 2000s and 2010s, reaching a peak during June 2010 before steadily declining outside of a brief rise in November 2020.

=== Community practices ===
Furry conventions and online platforms commonly maintain policies regulating the display and distribution of sexually explicit material. Some furry conventions also use age-restricted badges and limit access to adult-oriented events, artwork, and activities involving sexually explicit material. Platforms that host anthropomorphic artwork, such as Newgrounds, e621, Pornhub, DeviantArt, and Fur Affinity, use moderation systems to manage such content. Dedicated furry pornography Reddit communities (subreddits) also exist.

DeviantArt prohibits pornographic or explicitly sexual material, although "tasteful" nudity is permitted and explicit pornographic material can be easily located on-site despite its banned status. Access to mature content is restricted to account-registered users who are aged 18 and over.

Fur Affinity, a website dedicated to anthropomorphic artwork, uses access restrictions to separate adult material from general audiences. Content marked as "not safe for work" (NSFW) is limited to registered users over 18. The site prohibits content that includes sexual roleplay, but excludes discussion of adult themes, provided they aren't explicit. The site also prohibits material depicting underage characters.

== Analysis and studies ==
The International Anthropomorphic Research Project (IARP), a team of social scientists, has been collecting data on the furry fandom. Their 2016 publication collects several peer-reviewed and self-published studies into a single volume, titled Furscience. The IARP have found that many furries separate their fursonas from sexual activity, while others describe the fandom as a space for experimentation with identity, gender expression, and sexuality. Sexual aspects in the furry fandom include furry-themed erotic artwork and cybersex.

The term "yiff" is sometimes used to indicate sexual activity or sexual material within the fandom—this applies to sexual activity and interaction within the subculture whether in the form of cybersex or offline. This term peaked in usage in June 2010, according to Google Trends. The majority of furries responding to surveys on non-adult websites find that sexual attraction is not a very important part of their furry activities. Another survey at a furry convention in 2013 found that 96.3% of male furry respondents reported viewing furry pornography, compared with 78.3% of females; males estimated that 50.9% of all furry art they view is pornographic, compared with 30.7% in females. The respondents to the survey had a slight preference for pornographic furry artwork over non-pornographic artwork. 17.1% of males reported that when they viewed pornography, it was exclusively or near-exclusively furry pornography, and about 5% reported that pornography was the top factor that got them into the fandom.

A survey conducted from 1997 to 1998 reported about 2% of furry respondents stating an interest in zoophilia, and less than 1% an interest in plushophilia (sexually aroused by stuffed animal toys). The older, lower results, which are even lower than estimated in the general population, were due to the methodology of questioning respondents face-to-face, which led to social desirability bias. In contrast, one comparative study from 1974 and 1980 showed 7.5% of sampled students at University of Northern Iowa reporting zoophilia, while other studies find only 2.2% to 5.3% expressing fantasies of sex with animals. An anonymous survey in 2008 found 17% of respondents identified as zoophiles and it stated that most furries had a more moderate view of zoophilia. The study had 5,000 participants with 22.6% of them having an extremely negative view of zoophilia, 23% negative view, 36.3% ambivalent, 13.5% positive view, and 4.5% had an extremely positive view of it. Later sources have stated that both bestiality and zoophilia are considered taboo in the furry fandom, and there have been discussions in the fandom about distinguishing art of anthropomorphized animals from art of bestiality. A strong stigma remains against zoophiles in the furry fandom, with those who engage in the act being ostracized from in-person furry events and online. Despite this, a connection between the fandom and zoophilia remains, particularly in the perception of those unfamiliar with the fandom.

== See also ==
- Algospeak – Obfuscated speech on social media
- Bad Dragon – American sex toy manufacturer
- Cat Girl Manor – Colorado residence known for hosting animal roleplay
- Fetish art – Art that depicts fetishistic situations
- Fur fetishism – Sexual fetish relating to particular type of clothing
- Litter boxes in schools hoax – Right-wing hoax
- Overwatch and pornography – Pornography of the video game franchise Overwatch
- Pedobear – Internet meme
- Pokémon doujinshi incident – 1999 controversy
- Slang of the My Little Pony: Friendship Is Magic fandom – Vernacular of My Little Pony fans
- Smash or pass? – Party game
