= Lucario =

Pokémon species

- Pokémon character
- Lucario artwork by Ken Sugimori
- First appearance: Pokémon: Lucario and the Mystery of Mew (2005)
- First game: Pokémon Diamond and Pearl (2006)
- Designed by: Ken Sugimori (finalized)
- Voiced by: English: Sean Schemmel (movie, SSB for 3DS/Wii U - Ultimate) Bill Rogers (all other appearances); Japanese: Daisuke Namikawa (all other appearances) Daisuke Sakaguchi (anime, Riley’s/Gen’s and Maylene’s/Sumomo’s) Rikako Aikawa (anime, Cameron's/Kotetsu's) Kiyotaka Furushima (anime, Korrina's/Corni's)

In-universe information
- Species: Pokémon
- Type: Fighting and Steel

Lucario (/luːˈkɑːrioʊ/; Japanese: ルカリオ, Hepburn: Rukario) is a Pokémon species in Nintendo and Game Freak's Pokémon franchise. Created by Game Freak and finalized by Ken Sugimori, Lucario first appeared as a central character in the film Pokémon: Lucario and the Mystery of Mew, then as a cameo in Pokémon Mystery Dungeon: Blue Rescue Team and Red Rescue Team, and later appeared in the video games Pokémon Diamond and Pearl and later sequels. It additionally appears in various, spin-off titles and animated and printed adaptations of the franchise, and has been featured in several forms of merchandise, including figurines, plush toys, and the Pokémon Trading Card Game. Lucario is voiced by Daisuke Namikawa, Daisuke Sakaguchi, Rikako Aikawa and Kiyotaka Furushima in Japanese, and Bill Rogers and Sean Schemmel in English.

Known as the Aura Pokémon, Lucario can sense and manipulate aura (波導, hadō), a special kind of life energy. Lucario has also been featured as a playable character in the crossover fighting game series Super Smash Bros. since Super Smash Bros. Brawl. Since its debut, Lucario has received a positive reception, with critics responding positively to its design, and it has been a popular Pokémon with fans of the series. It has frequently been used in real-world promotion, including as an ambassador to promote fitness with children. It is also one of the few species capable of Mega Evolution, to which its design has been similarly praised.

== Concept and creation ==
Lucario is a species of fictional creatures called Pokémon created for the Pokémon media franchise. Developed by Game Freak and published by Nintendo, the Japanese franchise began in 1996 with the video games Pokémon Red and Green for the Game Boy, which were later released in North America as Pokémon Red and Blue in 1998. In these games and their sequels, the player assumes the role of a Trainer whose goal is to capture and use the creatures' special abilities to combat other Pokémon. Some Pokémon can transform into stronger species through a process called evolution via various means, such as exposure to specific items. Each Pokémon has one or two elemental types, which define its advantages and disadvantages when battling other Pokémon. A major goal in each game is to complete the Pokédex, a comprehensive Pokémon encyclopedia, by capturing, evolving, and trading with other Trainers to obtain individuals from all Pokémon species.

When developing Pokémon Diamond and Pearl, lead designer Ken Sugimori noted that the team wanted to "show new Pokémon that people have never seen before" and find ways to surprise people. He wanted the new designs to be able to "grow" on players and were intentionally made to feel "a little awkward at first". Director Junichi Masuda stated that when they started, they focused on "the strongest Pokemon" in each typing first. After the planning team was done, the design was finalized by Sugimori, who drew the species in multiple poses and defined smaller aspects such as its paws and face for the development team to work with afterward. Masuda considered Lucario's name as one of the most difficult to create, due to an effort to make it appeal to all audiences. The film Pokémon: Lucario and the Mystery of Mew, released during the game's development, affected how they approached Lucario's game counterpart, with Matsuda noting that he was excited to avoid the issues that arose with another Pokémon, Lugia, after the release of its own film.

Lucario is a canid-like Pokémon. Fans have speculated that it may be partly based on Anubis, the jackal-headed god of embalming from Egyptian mythology that is a bipedal digitigrade with finger-like digits on its forepaws. Its chest and the exterior of its wrists each feature a single, white spike. Lucario also has a large snout and ears, red irises with vertical slit pupils, an "hourglass"-shaped figure with thighs significantly thicker than the rest of its body, iron rings incorporated into its shoulders and waist, and a raccoon's "mask" that loosely resembles a khakkhara with four small dreadlock-like appendages on the back of its head that are used to sense aura. The coloration of Lucario's fur is predominantly blue and black, although its torso features buff-colored fur slightly shaggier than the rest of its body. When it opens its mouth wide enough, sharp fangs can be seen.

== Appearances ==
=== In video games ===
Lucario's debut and first video game appearance was in Pokémon Mystery Dungeon: Blue Rescue Team and Red Rescue Team, though it only appears in a cameo as a statue when the player gets the Lucario rank, the highest rank in the game. It then appeared in Pokémon Diamond and Pearl, such as where Cynthia, the final boss of the game, has Lucario on her team. Lucario later gained a Mega Evolution—a special transformation—in Pokémon X and Y. While holding Lucarionite, its Mega Stone, it can Mega Evolve into Mega Lucario during battle, gaining a power boost as a result. Mega Lucario Z, exclusive to the Pokémon Legends ZA Mega Dimension DLC, is the newest addition to Lucario's forms. Lucario would go on to appear in several later games in the series. It also appears as a playable character in Pokémon UNITE and Pokken Tournament and was in other spin-offs such as Pokémon Go and Pokémon Masters EX.

Due to an unintentional leak on Nintendo's official Super Smash Bros. website, which detailed how certain collectibles could be applied to certain characters, Lucario was indirectly confirmed as a playable character for Super Smash Bros. Brawl. In Brawl, Lucario is unlocked upon being encountered in the story mode at The Glacial Peak or through other special means. Lucario's special moveset in the series consists of many moves it can use in the Pokémon series. Its "Final Smash," or a powerful finisher attack, Aura Storm, consists of launching a powerful beam of aura at opponents. Lucario's fighting style revolves around a mixture of martial arts, including Shaolin Kung Fu, and aura manipulation. Aura itself is also a game mechanic unique to Lucario; its attacks become stronger as it continues to receive damage.

Lucario returned as a playable character in Super Smash Bros. for Nintendo 3DS and Wii U and again in Super Smash Bros. Ultimate, being voiced in both games by Sean Schemmel, who voiced Lucario in Pokémon: Lucario and the Mystery of Mew. Additionally, its aura mechanic now affects the entirety of its moveset. In Super Smash Bros. for Nintendo 3DS and Wii U, Lucario's Mega Evolution, Mega Lucario, replaced Aura Storm as its Final Smash, reflecting the form change introduced in Pokémon X and Y. In Super Smash Bros. Ultimate, its Final Smash consists of it Mega Evolving into Mega Lucario before performing Aura Storm.

=== In anime ===
Lucario debuted in the anime in the eighth Pokémon movie, Pokémon: Lucario and the Mystery of Mew. In the movie, Lucario is a servant to a nobleman named Sir Aaron in a Renaissance-themed city called Cameron Palace. Lucario thinks of Sir Aaron as his master and close friend; however, after Aaron traps him in a magic staff, Lucario begins questioning any Pokémon–human relationship. The Lucario in the movie, voiced in English by Sean Schemmel, can speak human languages through telepathy. Lucario ultimately sacrifices himself at the end of the film. Other Lucario later appear in the series. The anime series's protagonist Ash Ketchum later obtains a Lucario after his Riolu evolves in Pokémon Journeys: The Series during a battle against Chairman Rose, the main antagonist of Journeys series. It later gains the ability to Mega Evolve, and Ash uses it throughout the series.

== Promotion and reception ==
In Japan, Lucario has been used to promote fitness programs, such as radio calisthenics.

Lucario has been featured in several forms of merchandise, including figurines, plush toys, and the Pokémon Trading Card Game. Copies of Pokémon White sold at Target stores, including a promotional code to acquire Lucario early in the game. Lucario has also been a part of the third wave of amiibo, with its figure released on January 22, 2015, in Japan, and as a Toys "R" Us-exclusive beginning in February 2015 in North America. Nanoblock kits and gallery figures have been also made. As part of a partnership with Nintendo, Japan Post Insurance has used Lucario as an ambassador to promote radio calisthenics to children. Lucario has been used in similar promotions across Japan in order to encourage fitness.

Since its introduction, Lucario has been well received and was placed second on The Pokémon Company's Pokémon of the Year poll in 2020, which featured all Pokémon throughout the franchise. In 2023, Centennial Media's The Ultimate Guide to Pokémon noted that after compiling monthly search histories of Google, Yahoo, and Microsoft Bing, Lucario was the fourth highest searched Pokémon among internet users, with an approximate total of 126,200 average searches per month. Patricia Hernandez, in an examination of the furry fandom, stated Lucario was the most popular Pokémon for the subset dedicated to the franchise's characters. Meanwhile, the Pokémon has also been cited as one of the most frequently utilized in erotic works by the fandom and furry pornography, with a June 2023 study of such content on Rule 34 websites, such as e621, Rule 34.xxx, and Sankaku Channel, noting a significantly higher volume of material compared to characters from most other franchises, and the highest of characters from the Pokémon franchise as a whole.

IGN's Dale Bashir, calling Lucario the "unofficial poster child" for Pokémon from Diamond and Pearl, stated it was one of the best designs in the franchise, describing its "striking" design and noting its similarity to characters from the Digimon franchise. In another article, Bashir described it as a Pokémon that impacted the franchise the most due to its appearance in the Super Smash Bros. franchise, which elevated it to "Legendary" status by fans of the species. Game Informer writer John Carson regarded it as "arguably one of the most popular Pokémon" in the series. Den of Geek's Alec Bojalad argued that due to the frequent usage of them by Nintendo they "sometimes felt like a de facto franchise mascot in its own right", noting that while they didn't have Pikachu's "family friendly cuteness", they already had "the clear blessing of Nintendo and most fans." Ryan Woodrow in an article for Sports Illustrated noted that while Nintendo heavily pushed the species, he acknowledged its "brilliant design", calling it a "nice blend of the humanoid body but animalistic features that stop it from feeling uncanny", and adding that the lore around the species' abilities gave them an "anime-protagonist" mystery element.

Robert Grosso of Tech Raptor called Lucario "the perfect representation of the transition of Pokémon designs", noting that while they were an example of how Game Freak had "run out of designs," he acknowledged at the same time that they not only emerged as a successful and popular mascot but also as one of the most recognizable for the series as a whole. He further cited various elements as responsible for their popularity, namely their anthropomorphized appearance, the impact of their debut film, color scheme, and mix of "Jackal and Egyptian Boxer" aesthetic created a "perfect storm" of a design. He further added that while he was fascinated by how easily the species could fit into the Digimon franchise, and felt they were overrated, "in the end, it is a near perfect design."

While sources such as Paste and Den of Geek voiced praise for Lucario particularly for its appearance in Smash Bros., Isaiah McCall of The Gamer heavily criticized it. Noting that while Nintendo's frequent use of the species had made it a "fan-favorite", he felt it was too similar to another Pokémon, Mewtwo, and deemed it to be an inferior copy of it. Pointing out several shared elements between them, down to the abilities and body language, he added, "Lucario’s stardom piggybacked off of the nostalgia people had for Mewtwo", and that Lucario's replacement of the latter in Smash Bros. left players wanting to "cling to" a character in the same vein. He closed by stating that despite his disdain Lucario wasn't "terrible, but terribly overrated." In an article for USgamer, Nadia Oxford acknowledged this sentiment, but argued its unique design and traits helped it stand apart from Mewtwo, leaving it "not lacking for fans".

Dario Capelli and Roberto Luigi Pagani in a paper for SCANDIA likened Lucario's portrayal in Lucario and the Mystery of Mew to medieval tales of a knight and its familiar, where the knight would complete his quest and die while the familiar mourned at his grave. They felt that the character's death fulfilled its own knightly narrative, likening it and his reunion with Sir Aaron to the story of Yvain, the Knight of the Lion.
