= Cartoon pornography =

Cartoon characters in sexual situations

Eveready Harton in Buried Treasure, a pornographic short cartoon, c. 1929

Cartoon pornography is the portrayal of illustrated or animated fictional cartoon characters in erotic or sexual situations. Animated cartoon pornography, or erotic animation, is a subset of the larger field of adult animation, not all of which is sexually explicit.

Because historically most cartoons have been produced for child and all-ages audiences, cartoon pornography has sometimes been subject to criticism and extra scrutiny compared to live-action erotic films or photographs. It is somewhat common in Japan, where it is part of a genre of entertainment commonly referred to outside of Japan as hentai.

Cartoon pornography has significantly increased in production since the introduction of the internet, with the creation of websites dedicated to adult animation. The internet has also led to animated pornography being distributed on social media.

== History ==
One of the earliest examples of erotic animation is The Virgin with the Hot Pants, a stag film that opens with an animated sequence featuring an independent penis and testicles pursuing a naked woman and having sex with her, then another sequence of a mouse sexually penetrating a cat. Another early example is Eveready Harton in Buried Treasure, a 6.5-minute silent black-and-white animated film produced in 1928 by three US animation studios, allegedly for a private party in honor of Winsor McCay. It features a man with a large, perpetually erect penis who has various misadventures with other characters and farm animals, plus his penis detaching and doing things on its own. In 1932, Hakuzan Kimura completed Japan's first erotic animation Suzumi-bune using touches of Ukiyo-e style.

The Golden Age of Porn, which saw mainstream filmmakers and cinemas tentatively experiment with sexually explicit material with fully developed plots and storytelling themes, also saw some renewed interest in similar erotic animation. Examples include Out of an Old Man's Head (1968) by Per Åhlin and Tage Danielsson, Tarzoon: Shame of the Jungle (1975) by Picha and Boris Szulzinger, and Historias de amor y masacre (1979) by Jorge Amorós. Animator Ralph Bakshi produced Fritz the Cat (1972) (based loosely on the comic of Robert Crumb), which was the first animated film to receive an "X" rating in the US. The Italian film Il nano e la strega (released in English as King Dick, 1973) was a medieval fantasy story told entirely by hand-drawn animation. Once Upon a Girl (1976) featured live-action framing sequences around pornographic versions of well-known fairy tales. Animerama was a series of animated erotic films begun by Osamu Tezuka: A Thousand and One Nights (1969), Cleopatra (1970), and Belladonna of Sadness (1973). In addition, known as mockbusters, Maruhi Gekiga, Ukiyo-e Senichiya (1969), and Do It! Yasuji's Pornorama (1971) released.

Since the 1980s, erotica has been a popular genre of animation in Japan. Erotic Japanese anime – some based on erotic manga, often released as original video animation – called hentai feature sexually suggestive and explicit sex scenes.

In the early 21st century, producers began applying digital animation technology to erotic material. In 2000, Playboy TV began running the erotic dystopian sci-fi series Dark Justice, which used 3D animation, and ran for 20 episodes. In 2001, illustrator Joe Phillips released The House of Morecock, a comedic erotic feature film for gay and bisexual male audiences, made using 2D digital animation.

The 2006 short Sex Life of Robots turned to the traditional technique of stop-motion animation to depict the imagined sexual activities of living robots. In 2013 Savita Bhabhi, an Indian Hindi-language animated film directed by Deshmukh (Puneet Agarwal) was released as a web film. It was based on Agarwal's Kirtu webcomic character Savita Bhabhi (published online since 2008) and was the first adult animated film from India.

Animated content has become popular on pornographic video services, which sometimes report terms such as "anime", "hentai", and "cartoon" – all of which are commonly associated with animation – among the top search terms. In November 2020, Ana Valens of The Daily Dot highlighted the popularity of "Source Filmmaker porn", referring to SFM porn which is created using Source Filmmaker by "adult creators."

== Legal status ==
The legal status of cartoon pornography varies from country to country. In addition to the normal legal status of pornography, some cartoon pornography depicts potentially minor characters engaging in sexual acts. One of the primary reasons for this may be due to the many cartoons featuring major characters who are not adults. Cartoon pornography does not always have depictions of minors in sexual acts or situations, but that which does may fall under the jurisdiction laws concerning child pornography. Drawings of pre-existing characters can in theory be in violation of copyright law, no matter what the situation the characters are shown in.

== See also ==
- Adult animation – Animation aimed at adults
- Clop – Erotic fan art related to the My Little Pony media franchise
- Erotic comics – Adult comics which focus substantially on nudity and sexual activity
- Ecchi – Japanese term for playful sexual actions
- Elsagate – Controversy concerning a genre of YouTube videos
- Fan service – Parts of a fictional work intended to please the audience
- Hentai – Anime and manga pornography
- Overwatch and pornography – Pornography of the video game franchise Overwatch
- Pokémon and pornography – Pornography of the media franchise Pokémon
- Rule 34 – Internet slang regarding pornography
- Rule 63 – Internet slang regarding gender swapped versions of characters
- Yiff – Pornography of anthropomorphic animal characters
