= Domina =

Domina may refer to:

- Female form of Dominus (title)
- Domina (grape), a type of grape
- Domina (Image Comics), a character of the Spawn comic book series
- Domina (TV series), a 2021 UK historical-drama television series
- Domina (video game), a gladiator management game by DolphinBarn
- Domina, one of the Neo (Marvel Comics species)
- Domina (Overwatch), a character in the Overwatch franchise.
- Domina a synonym for the fly genus Psilopa

== People with the surname ==
- David Domina (born 1950), American politician

== See also ==
- Dominia (disambiguation)
- Dominatrix
