= E621 (website) =

Furry-themed imageboard art website

e621 / e926
- e621's standard logo, currently used on the site's footer outside the home page (Note: An LGBT pride variant of this logo is currently used on the navigation bar in the header by default since June 2025. A themes page (e926 link) allows users to change the logo to one of several variants.)

- Home page (Note: The home page was modified for the screenshot to remove non-free background images of a mascot.)
- Website type: Furry fandom-themed imageboard art website
- Founded: February 10, 2007; 19 years ago (e621); October 17, 2022; 4 years ago (e6AI)
- Dissolved: November 13, 2026; 6 days ago (e6AI)
- Headquarters: Arizona, United States
- Area served: Worldwide
- Owner: Dragonfruit Ventures LLC
- Key people: Jan "Varka" Mulders (owner)
- Website: e621.net (main site) e926.net (SFW site) e6ai.net (AI art; formerly)
- Commercial: No
- Registration: Optional (Note: Required to upload content, view blacklisted content, edit the wiki and content tags, and post comments, "blips", and forum posts.)
- Current status: Active (e621/e926); Defunct (e6AI)
- Written in: Ruby

e621 (Note: The most common pronunciations of the site's name are "ee-six-two-one" and "ee-six-twenty-one" (likewise, "ee-nine-two-six" and "ee-nine-twenty-six" for e926), though according to one of the site's administrators, "The proper way is ee-six-two-one. Sounding out each letter and number." Collectively, both sites may also be referred to simply as eSix or e6.) is a furry-themed booru-style imageboard and art archive website launched on February 10, 2007. It is primarily known for hosting pornographic furry content.

Hosting over 5 million images as of August 2026, the website is owned by Jan "Varka" Mulders via Dragonfruit Ventures LLC; Mulders is also the CEO of sex toy manufacturer Bad Dragon. e621 also maintains a safe for work (SFW) mirror site called e926, which runs on the same servers and thus maintains the same adults-only restriction e621 has. A sister site for AI-generated artwork called e6AI was launched on October 17, 2022, and was shut down on November 13, 2026, following public outcry.

e621 is among the most-visited furry websites, alongside the art community Fur Affinity.

== Name ==
E621 is the E number for monosodium glutamate, a flavor enhancer. Dictionary.com proposes that the website was named after this as a reference to its content being "tasty"; the online dictionary website also notes that e621's safe for work mirror website, e926, is the E number for the bleaching agent chlorine dioxide, which they state is perhaps a "reference to figurative eye bleach".

== Overview ==
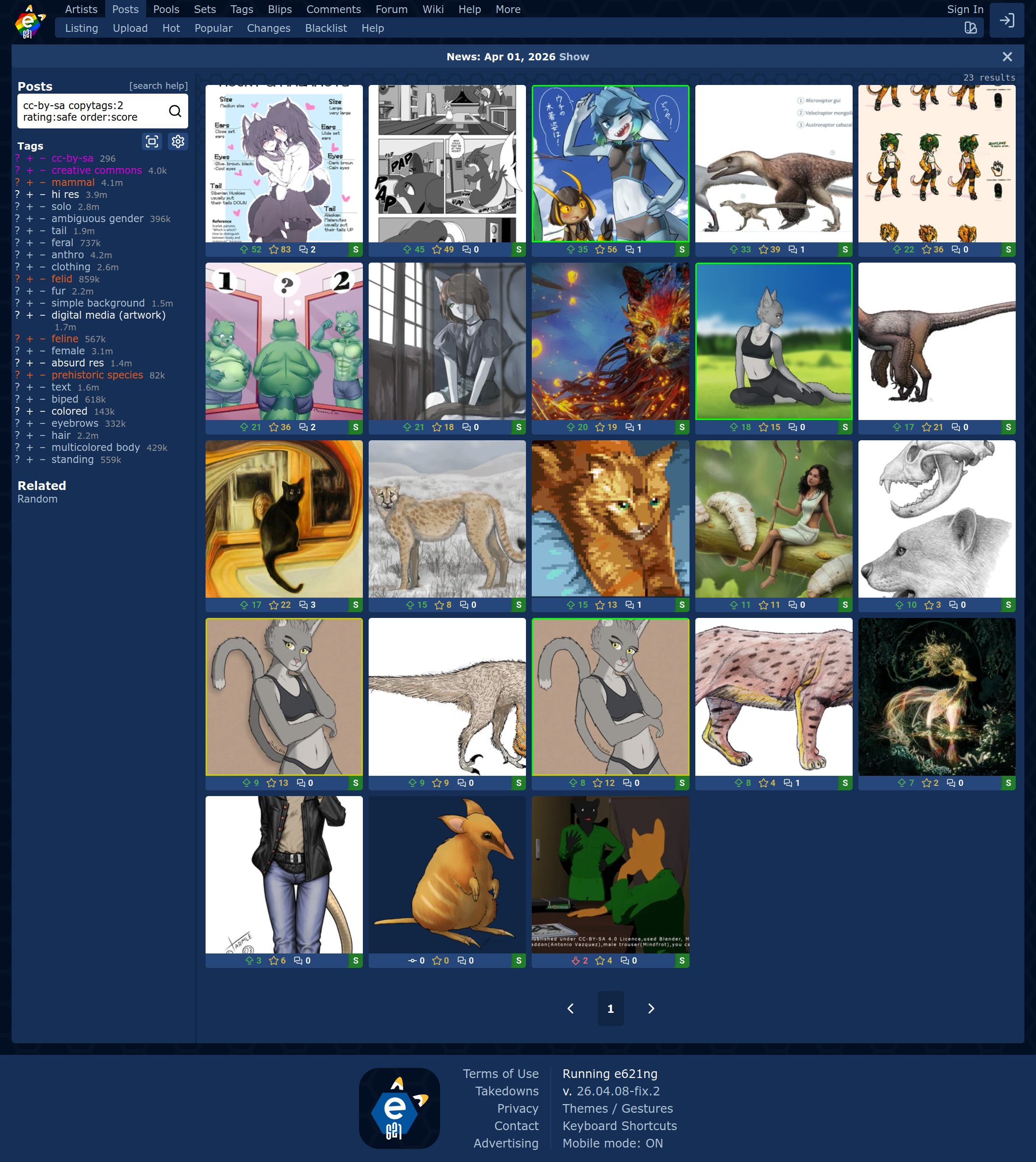
e621 is a booru that uses a tag system for image categorization.

e621 is a furry-themed booru-style imageboard: a gallery in which "posts" (uploads encompassing images, videos, and Adobe Flash files under the SWF format prior to the format's discontinuation), largely digital art images, are categorized with tags. While e621 allows for both safe for work and not safe for work content, furry pornography—known as yiff—is the website's largest collection; it is also for what e621 is best known. In this way, users can utilize the tagging function to search for artwork containing particular fetishes or kinks. e621 also hosts other forms of artwork, such as kemonomimi, Pokémon, and ponies from the animated children's TV series My Little Pony: Friendship Is Magic (the erotic art of which is known as clop).

Over 82,469 posts on e621 were tagged My Little Pony by 2015; by 2017, the number of such images had nearly doubled to 147,037. Since 2011, Twilight Sparkle has been the most frequently tagged character (apart from the "fan character" tag, which is for unofficial characters based on pre-existing IPs), reaching 33,792 tagged posts by March 2023. As of July 2026, the five most tagged characters on e621 are, in descending order, Twilight Sparkle with over 41,200 posts, Judy Hopps from Zootopia with over 40,800 posts, Rouge the Bat from Sonic the Hedgehog with over 33,000 posts, Fluttershy with over 32,000 posts, and Loona from Helluva Boss with over 31,200 posts.

On March 5, 2020, e621 released its source code under the terms of the 2-clause BSD license. The site is a heavily-modified fork of the Danbooru anime-focused imageboard, and uses the Ruby on Rails framework.

As of January 2024, e621 had almost 4 million posts. The website is owned by Jan "Varka" Mulders, who is also the CEO of sex toy manufacturer Bad Dragon. The website also contains a discussion forum and a wiki for its tags, as well as a safe for work (SFW) mirror site called e926. As of February 2025, AI-generated art or AI-assisted art is generally banned from being posted on e621 with exceptions for backgrounds, artwork that references, but does not directly use, AI-generated content, and for audio for video posts.

On October 17, 2022, Dragonfruit Ventures launched e6AI, a sister website dedicated to hosting AI furry art, with the intention of separating such material from the main e621 website. Although it was never directly advertised on the main e621 website, e6AI nevertheless garnered controversy, with users and e621 staff members—current and former—criticizing its existence. The criticism reached a breaking point in late October 2026 when furry artist TheKoboldKing posted about it on Bluesky, leading to several furry artists filing takedowns and requests to be added to e621's "do not post" (DNP) list in protest of its existence. On November 3, following a news post on e621 the previous day about generative AI and having the site's terms of service updated to clarify e621's ban on data scraping for generative AI databases and models, Dragonfruit Ventures announced that they would shut down e6AI. The announcement also clarified that e6AI was only used for hosting AI art, not generating such. Following this, e6AI announced on November 4 that uploading was disabled and it would shut down on November 13, which has since gone through. The moderators of the e6AI Discord server have since taken archival efforts and resumption of service under a different site unaffiliated with Dragonfruit Ventures called Floofgens.

== Website blocks ==
On December 21, 2023, access to e621 was blocked in Russia by the Russian censorship agency Roskomnadzor. Officially, this was due to the site allegedly hosting numerous pornographic illustrations depicting minors.

On January 1, 2024, e621 blocked access to itself from IP addresses originating in the U.S. state of North Carolina following the passing of the Pornography Age Verification Enforcement (PAVE) Act, which requires pornographic websites to verify a user's age.

== Popularity ==
e621 is among the most-visited furry websites, alongside Fur Affinity. A 2017 survey of attendees at Anthrocon—an annual furry convention in Pittsburgh, Pennsylvania—conducted by the International Anthropomorphic Research Project found that e621 was the 8th most-visited "furry-themed" website listed by participants.

== See also ==
- Booru – Type of Internet forum
- Derpibooru – My Little Pony fan art website
- Fur Affinity – Furry-centric art website
- Furry fandom – Subculture interested in anthropomorphic animals
- Furry pornography – Pornography of anthropomorphic animal characters
- Internet pornography – Any pornography that is accessible over the Internet
- Imageboard – Type of Internet forum
