= Charlet Chung =

American actress (born 1983)

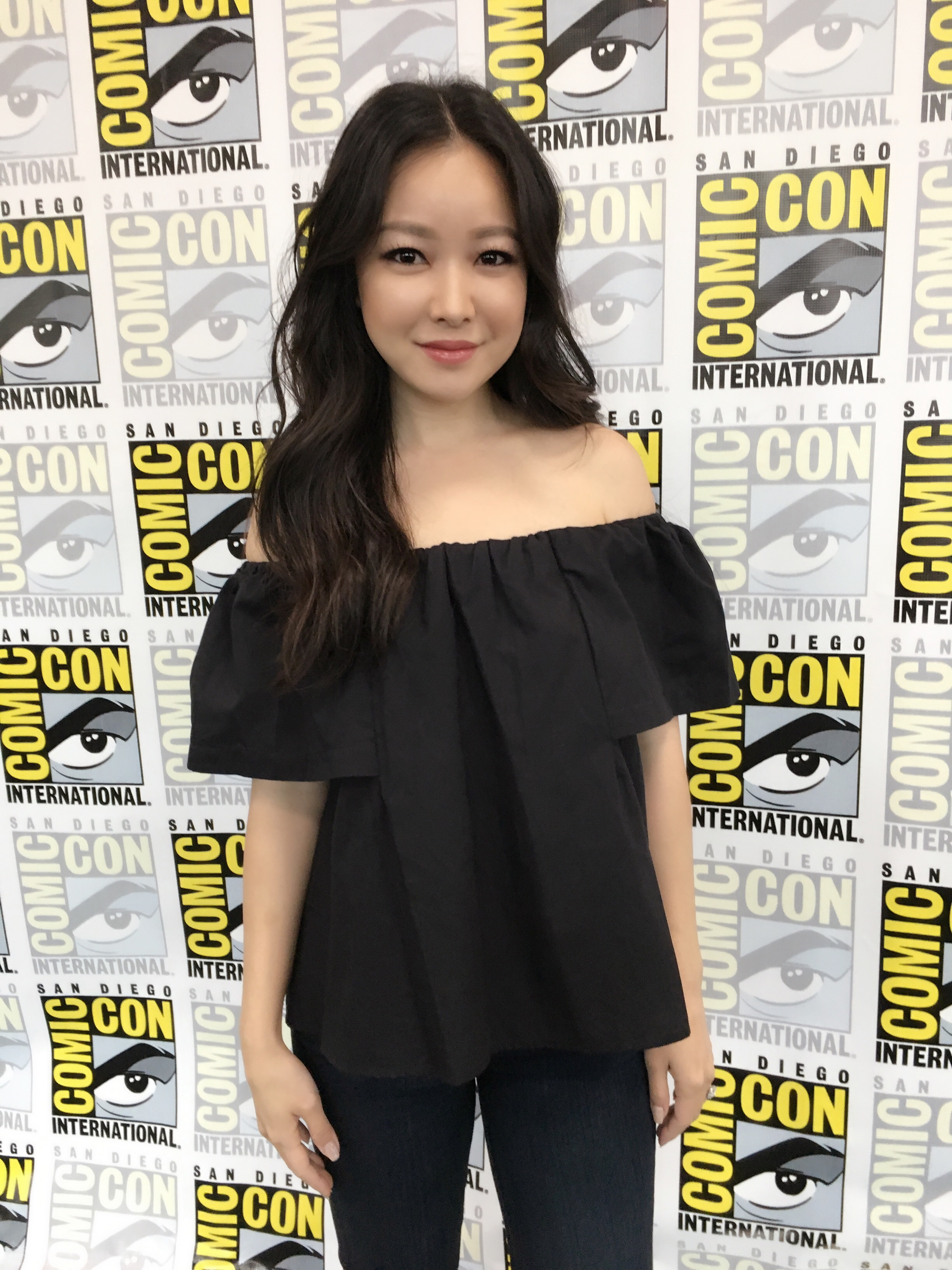
- Chung in 2017
- Born: Chihye Takahashi Chung; February 16, 1983 (age 43); Long Beach, California, U.S.
- Other name: Chie Takahashi
- Education: University of California, San Diego
- Occupation: Actress
- Spouse: Tom Yoo
- Children: 2

Korean name
- Hangul: 정지혜
- Hanja: 鄭智憓
- RR: Jeong Jihye
- MR: Chŏng Chihye

Japanese name
- Kanji: 高橋 知恵
- Kana: たかはし ちえ
Transcriptions
- Romanization: Takahashi Chie
- Website: www.charletchung.com

Chihye "Charlet" Takahashi Chung (born February 16, 1983) is an American actress who is best known for her works in voice acting, as well as for her various roles throughout film and television. She voices the fictional character D.Va in the multiplayer-shooter video game Overwatch and has reprised the role for the crossover game Heroes of the Storm. She also voiced Seraph in the shooter video game Call of Duty: Black Ops III. In television, Chung has made appearances on shows such as Cold Case, Cory in the House, 90210, Shake It Up and Grace and Frankie. In 2019, she joined the main cast of two Netflix animated series; on Carmen Sandiego as Julia Argent and on Fast & Furious Spy Racers as Margaret "Echo" Pearl.

== Early life ==
Chung was born as Chihye Takahashi Chung in Long Beach California, to a Japanese mother and a Korean father and is fluent and literate in three languages: English, Japanese, and Korean.

Chung graduated from Diamond Bar High School in 2001.

== Career ==
Her interest in acting began from a young age. She was discovered and signed on by an agent while on an airplane at the age of five. She landed her first acting role on CBS's Cold Case within three months after graduating with a Bachelor in Communications from the University of California, San Diego. In 2016, Chung made an appearance on the Netflix television series Grace and Frankie where she starred as the character Charlotte.

Chung has also done work as a voice actress. Her video game appearances include her role as Seraph from the game Call of Duty: Black Ops 3 and her popular portrayal of D.Va from Blizzard's 2016 game Overwatch. She also voices Ally "Hoops" Nguyen in the 2022 game Grounded.

In 2022, Chung partnered with Voiceverse, a blockchain-based startup that marketed itself as offering AI voice cloning technology in the form of non-fungible tokens.

== Personal life ==
Chung is married to Tom Yoo. In May 2019, she gave birth to a son and in November 2020 gave birth to a daughter.

== Filmography ==
=== Television ===
Year	Title	Role	Notes
2006	Cold Case	Barbie Yen	Episode: "Death Penalty: "Final Appeal"
2007	Cheerleader Camp	JoJo	Main cast
2007	Mad TV	Extra	Episode: "Episode #12. 13"
2007	Drake & Josh	Teen Girl	Episode: "Battle of Panthatar"
2007	Side Order of Life	Deb No. 2	Episode: "Coming Out"
2007	Cory in the House	Brunette Ashley	Episode: "Lip Service"
2008	Broken Angel	Taki	Guest appearance
2008	Greek	Gamma Psi Sister	Episode: "Brothers & Sisters"
2008	Boston Legal	Kim Wang Shu	Episode: "Roe"
2008	Desperate Housewives	Secretary	Episode: "A Vision's Just a Vision", uncredited
2008	Sincerely, Ted L. Nancy	Lisa	Main cast
2010	Weeds	Jane	Episode: "Bliss"
2010	90210	Jen's Assistant	Episode: "Age of Inheritance"
2010	Shake It Up	Candy Cho	Episode: "Show It Up"
2011	The Hard Times of RJ Berger	Grace	Episode: "RJ's Choice"
2011	Chuck	Susie Chin	Episode: "Chuck Versus the Bearded Bandit"
2012	Touch	Mandy Hsu	Episode: "Entanglement"
2014	Mystery Girls	Tika	Episode: "Passing the Torch"
2015	Ana Maria in Novela Land	Korean Soap Actress	Supporting cast
2015	Two Girls, One Up	Charlet	Main cast
2016	Grace and Frankie	Charlotte	Episode: "The Chicken"
2016	Fameless	Chie	Episode: "I Robot?"
2017	We Bare Bears	Additional Voices, Mrs. Lee (voice)	Episode: "Spa Day"
2018–20	Craig of the Creek	Yustice, Clerk (voice)	6 episodes
2018	Overwatch: Shooting Star	D.Va (voice)	Short film
2019–20	Spirit Riding Free	Ursula Yang (voice)	Pony Tales/Riding Academy
2019–20	American Dad!	Additional voices	4 episodes
2019–21	Fast & Furious Spy Racers	Echo (voice)	Main cast
2019–21	Carmen Sandiego	Julia Argent, Shopkeeper, Model 4, Nurse (voice)	Main cast
2020	Magic Camp	Bridesmaid	Film (credit only; scene deleted)
2021–26	Rugrats	Kimi Watanabe, Sporty Woman (voice)	Main cast
2022	Oni: Thunder God's Tale	Tanukinta, Darma, Kijiyama (voice)	Credited as Charlet Takahashi Chung

=== Film ===
Year	Title	Role	Notes
2021	The Addams Family 2	Dorky Girl, Madison, Girl on Beach, Festival Kids (voice)	Film

=== Video games ===
Year	Title	Voice role	Notes
2014	Call of Duty: Advanced Warfare	Korean Civilian, Spokesmodel	
2015	Call of Duty: Black Ops III	Seraph	
2016	StarCraft II: Nova Covert Ops	Additional Voices	
2016	Overwatch	D.Va	
2016	StarCraft II: Legacy of the Void	D.Va	
2017	Heroes of the Storm	D.Va	
2017	Agents of Mayhem	AISHA, Schaeffer	
2018	State of Decay 2	Survivor	
2020	Final Fantasy VII Remake	Additional Voices	
2020	Grounded	Ally "Hoops" Nguyen	
2020	World of Warcraft: Shadowlands	Willowblossom	
2022	Overwatch 2	D.Va	
