= D.Va =

Fictional video game character

- Overwatch character
- Artwork featuring D.Va's appearance in Overwatch, alongside her mech suit
- First appearance: Overwatch (2016)
- Designed by: Arnold Tsang; Ben Zhang (weaponry)
- Voiced by: Charlet Chung

In-universe information
- Class: Tank
- Origin: Busan, South Korea
- Nationality: South Korean

D.Va (/divɑː/) is the call sign of Hana Song, a character developed by Blizzard Entertainment for their Overwatch franchise. She was introduced at the launch of the franchise's first entry, a 2016 first-person hero shooter video game, and returned in its 2022 sequel, Overwatch 2. She features in the franchise's related animated and literary media. Outside of Overwatch, D.Va also appears as a playable character in the crossover multiplayer online battle arena (MOBA) game Heroes of the Storm and as a gameplay announcer in StarCraft II: Legacy of the Void. In English-language media, D.Va is voiced by Charlet Chung.

In Overwatch lore, D.Va is a professional eSports gamer from Busan, South Korea. Along with other pro gamers, she is recruited by the Mobile Exo-Force of the Korean Army (MEKA) to help quell an uprising by robotic Omnics, using their video game-playing skills to control weaponized mech suits. Within the game, D.Va is a tank character who can deal a stream of damage and, for a short time, neutralize incoming attacks. If her suit is destroyed, she can eject from it and survive long enough to call in a new suit. Her Ultimate Ability allows her to self-detonate her suit, dealing heavy enough damage to eliminate most characters within line of sight.

== Development and design ==
D.Va, along with Genji and Mei, was announced in November 2015 at BlizzCon; she was one of the final heroes to be introduced into Overwatch prior to its official release. Voice actor Charlet Chung provides the character's English-language voice. During development, D.Va's real name was initially Na Yeri (나예리), before Hana Song (송하나) was settled on as a nod to Hana, a member of the 2002 Korean girl group Déjà Vu.

D.Va is designed as a tank character who uses a highly mobile pink mech suit in battle, and acts as a "skirmisher". Seen beyond her mech suit, pink is a core part of D.Va's visual design, being featured in marks on her face, the bodysuit in her default skin, and her light gun.

One of Overwatch's initial character concepts was a hero who piloted a mech; the designers ultimately decided that the pilot could eject if their suit sustained critical damage and fight outside without protection. The game's assistant art director Arnold Tsang was inspired by mecha anime and manga for D.Va's look. The designers initially based the mech's stickers and artwork on a cat theme, but later changed it to a rabbit because they thought its short-range booster rockets made it look as though it was bunny hopping.

According to Goodman, early in her development, D.Va was able to deal more damage but her damage output was lowered because "she would fly into someone's face, destroy them, and fly away. There was little that person could do because [of] her mobility." Despite agreeing with feedback calling D.Va under-powered, Goodman said improvements to the character "are unlikely to take the shape of increasing her damage output significantly", adding "the goal is that she should be a viable aggressive initiation tank, much like Winston can be". The discussion of buffing D.Va coincided with a discussion on nerfing the character Cassidy, (Note: At the time of this change, the character was known as McCree.) who had been noted to eliminate tank characters too quickly; game director Jeff Kaplan said D.Va's buffs would take longer to develop and implement than the changes to Cassidy. Kaplan also said the development team would be exploring improvements to her damage output and survivability but would "probably pick one direction or the other". The character's ultimate ability was eventually buffed; the cost and explosion delay were reduced and the possibility for the activating player to be killed by their own ultimate ability was removed. Her "Defense Matrix" ability was changed to be toggled on and off at will with a resource meter rather than being a single-use ability with a cooldown.

In August 2017, in response to their observations of the meta-game, Blizzard planned to introduce changes to D.Va to be tested in the Public Test Realm (PTR) server and evaluated before full release. Namely, the developers found that D.Va was being used more frequently to absorb damage through her Defense Matrix and was not being played offensively. The revamped skill kit would increase the rate of energy depletion of the Defense Matrix, effectively reducing its use time by half, but would allow her to use her main weapon while boosting. The update also added a new Micro Missiles ability that launches a number of small missiles that do damage in a small area on impact. Kaplan said that the overall goal of D.Va's ability retooling was to "reduce her reliance on Defense Matrix and make her more fun to play," and stressed the changes were not meant to nerf D.Va overall. These changes were added for all players in a September 2017 patch.

Blizzard considers D.Va the most difficult character that they must develop around when adding new game modes or other features; as described by assistant director Aaron Keller, "she breaks everything" due to having two different forms for which they must account.

As with other characters in Overwatch, D.Va has equippable cosmetics that players can unlock, such as skins. In August 2018, Blizzard released the "Nano Cola Challenge", referring to an in-universe beverage that D.Va favors, and offering unlockable cosmetics for the character. When Blizzard added her "Academy" skin to the game in 2019, depicting D.Va in a schoolgirl outfit, Kaplan commented that it would likely "break the internet".

== Appearances ==
=== Overwatch ===
Both Overwatch and its sequel lack a traditional campaign or story mode; its lore and character backgrounds, including D.Va's, are instead shown in-game through map design and character voice lines. In Overwatch, D.Va is the screen name of Hana Song, a 19-year-old former professional gamer, known for becoming the No. 1 ranked StarCraft II player in the world and maintaining an undefeated record prior to her retirement from gaming in order to defend her homeland. During the in-universe Omnic Crisis event, an omnic monster rose from the East China Sea, destroying coastal cities including those in South Korea and its neighbors. The South Korean government developed the Mobile Exo-Force of the Korean Army (MEKA), a mobile armored drone unit to combat the omnic monster, although each battle resulted in a stalemate. The omnic continued to adapt to the MEKA's drone networks, turning them against the Koreans. The South Korean government struggled with finding pilots for new mechs, eventually turned to the country's professional gamers, thought to have necessary reflexes and instincts to effectively operate the mech suits' advanced weaponry. Based in Busan, D.Va was one of the pro gamers drafted by South Korea's government. Known for being fearless in combat against the omnics, she would develop a global following as she began live streaming her combat encounters. Within MEKA, D.Va is supported by Dae-hyun, a mechanic and D.Va's childhood friend, and takes orders from Myung, the MEKA's commanding officer. By Overwatch 2, D.Va was aged 21 and then based at Watchpoint: Gibraltar.

Outside of Overwatch, D.Va also appears in the updated dating sim game Loverwatch, exclusive to Chinese regions. Blizzard has also disseminated Overwatch story elements external to the games. D.Va is the focus of the animated short Shooting Star, released in August 2018. Its release coincided with a new control map based on Busan. The short shows the origin of D.Va's Self-Destruct ability, being forced to use it to fend off a wave of attacking Omnics to protect Busan. D.Va was featured in the final issue of New Blood, a limited series centering on Cassidy's efforts to recruit members into the Overwatch organization. Released in March 2022, the issue sees D.Va requesting permission from her MEKA captain to contact Overwatch. Communication with Overwatch, however, has been forbidden and D.Va is told to keep her focus on local Korea-based missions.

==== Gameplay ====
D.Va possesses a tank role in Overwatch; PC Gamer has described D.Va as an "offtank" character, which typically allows players "more freedom to play [aggressively]" compared to other tank characters. She is suited in her mech which is equipped with twin Fusion Cannons that do not need reloading. The Fusion Cannons deal substantial damage at close range, but consequentially slow her mobility. D.Va also comes equipped with Boosters and a Defense Matrix; the Boosters quickly move her in the direction that the player's reticle is facing, potentially allowing for short periods of flight, and additionally lightly damaging and knocking back enemies that come in contact with her while boosting. D.Va's Defense Matrix absorbs incoming enemy projectiles heading toward her. She can also fire a volley of Micro-Missiles that have a small area of splash damage upon impact.

Once her mech suit runs out of hitpoints (HP), D.Va ejects out of it, equipped with only a Light Gun. Though more vulnerable while outside the mech, she is a considerably smaller and more maneuverable target in this state. D.Va can also eject out of her mech suit as part of her Self Destruct ultimate ability, which causes her mech suit to explode and deal massive area of effect damage shortly after ejection. Once the mech explodes, D.Va can use her second ultimate ability, Call Mech, which simply allows her to resuit into her mech. This can be done immediately after using the Self Destruct ability, but otherwise has a cooldown period that can be sped up by damaging opponents while on foot.

=== Other Blizzard projects ===
In May 2017, as part of the version 2.0 update, D.Va was added to the roster of playable heroes in Blizzard's crossover multiplayer online battle arena (MOBA) game Heroes of the Storm. Additionally, those who played Heroes of the Storm during the game's version 2.0 launch event, dubbed "Nexus Challenge 2.0", received cosmetics for D.Va's character in Overwatch. D.Va made her first appearance for Heroes of the Storm in the "Hanamura Showdown", a non-canon cinematic trailer for the Heroes 2.0 update, in April 2017. She was the fifth Overwatch character added to Heroes.

As Overwatch lore heralds her as a world champion StarCraft II player, D.Va was added as a gameplay announcer for StarCraft II: Legacy of the Void, originally as part of a gift bundle, including announcer and player portrait features for attendees of BlizzCon 2016.

== Promotion and reception ==
D.Va has been well received by critics and players, particularly among Overwatch's female and LGBT fanbase. Media writers have commented positively on her design's considerably feminine attributes and have noted her likeness being used in feminist movements. Critics have also juxtaposed D.Va's status as a feminist icon in gaming with that of her sexualized image online, citing her prominence in fan-produced pornography. Her presence in other fan-produced works, such as cosplay and memes, has also been documented.

D.Va's character and gameplay design has been positively received by video game journalists. Likewise, the game's community has spurred a fandom around D.Va, with the character topping numerous fan popularity polls, having a noted presence amongst cosplayers, and being considered both a feminist icon and sex symbol in gaming. (Note: Sources that cite such opinions include:) Blizzard has released figurine lines featuring D.Va, including a partnership with Good Smile Company that saw the distribution of a D.Va Nendoroid figure. In 2017, Razer released D.Va-themed PC gaming accessories. Both in officially-licensed and fan-made merchandise, the color pink is a markedly common motif. In a collaboration with Disc City Entertainment Co., select cafes in Japan served dishes inspired by the character and others in the Overwatch cast.

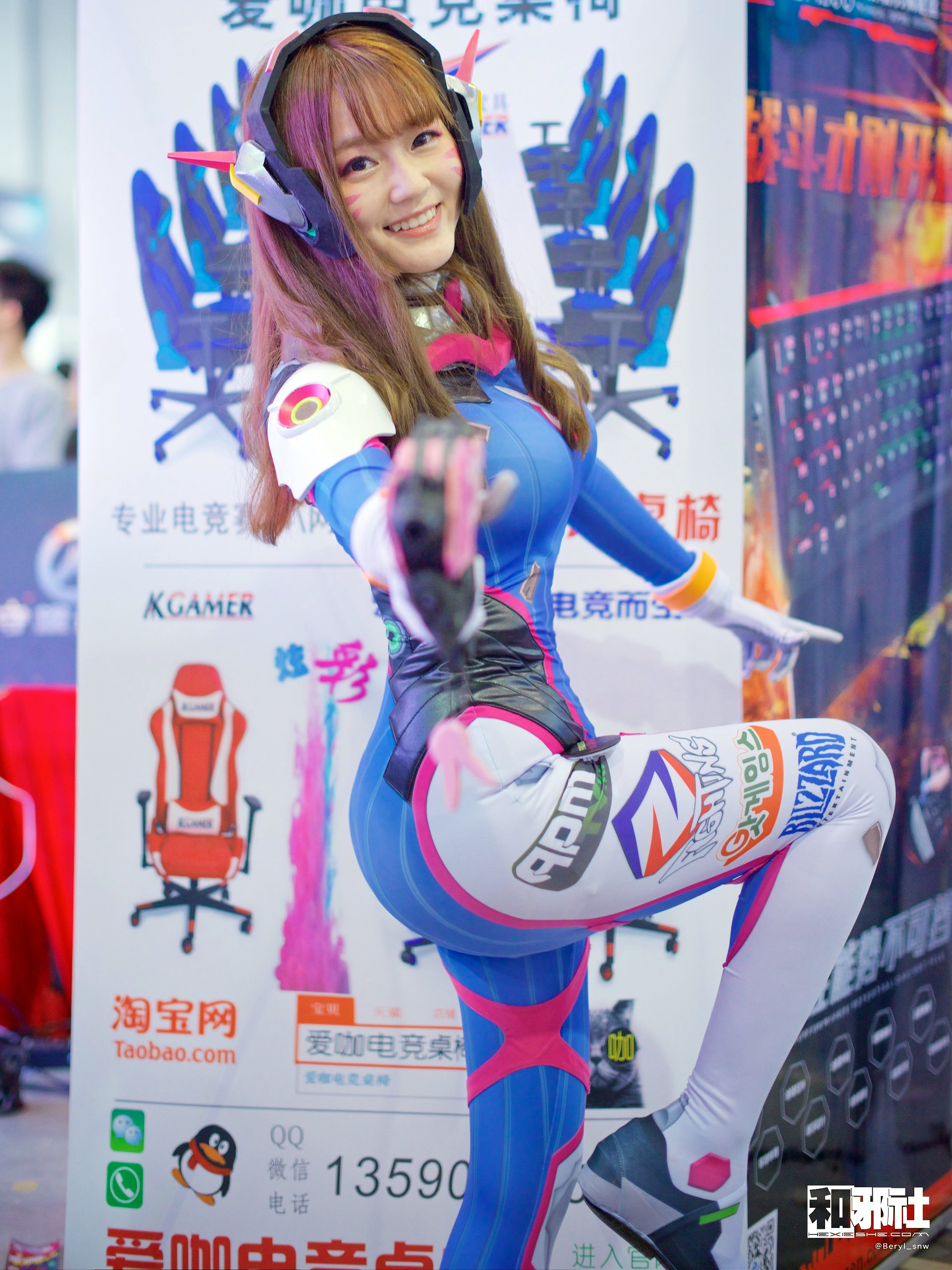
Cosplay of D.Va's default skin featured in both Overwatch games

A considerable amount of praise has been directed toward D.Va's representation of and impact on women in video game contexts. Writing for Heroes Never Die, Natalie Flores called her "the first character of her kind in a game with the success and notoriety that Overwatch has," and adding "she's more than just a single character; she's a monumental milestone that many people — especially women of color — have worked toward making a reality for years in the gaming industry." Flores also issued heavy praise for the merchandising around D.Va, particularly for its commitment to uphold the "hyper-feminine" nature of the character, writing that D.Va "presents a unique accessibility that femme girls and women have largely been unable to have in gaming, especially in the world of esports, until now — and it's most evident through her merchandise [... which] is loudly pink and incorporates pastels and cute animal faces. It's relentlessly feminine." Joseph Knoop of The Daily Dot ranked D.Va as the best character in Overwatch, writing "'Nerf this.' Never before have two words encapsulated so much spirit, energy, and drive to win at all costs," and calling her "an icon." Referencing D.Va's exemplification of a "softer feminism", Knoop added "There's a reason she's far and away the most cosplayed Overwatch character, and it's not just the simplicity of her jumpsuit. When you hear the hum of an imploding mech flying through the air, it's not just a gameplay mechanic. It's a signal that great change is on the way for all lady gamers."

Tech Insider's Steve Kovach called D.Va his favorite character. Kotaku's Kirk Hamilton praised the buff she received in July 2016, writing that it "transformed her into the high-flying terror I've always wanted her to be." Tyler Colp of PC Gamer complimented D.Va's ultimate ability, calling it one of the "most splashy" in Overwatch. Citing her Defensive Matrix ability, "devastating combination of mobility and damage", and the ease of learning her gameplay, Den of Geek called her the game's best tank character upon the release of Overwatch 2. In a review of Shooting Star, Connor Sheridan of GamesRadar+ complimented the short's efforts to character D.Va "beyond her 'lol git gud' voice lines," suggesting "that's a competitive persona she drops when she's hanging out with close friends."

Her perception amongst fans includes her depiction as a "Cheetos-eating gamer gremlin". A popular meme of the character, dubbed "Gremlin D.Va", features fan art of the character in which a chibi version of her is portrayed indulging in gamer stereotypes, such as eating Doritos and drinking Mountain Dew. An August 2016 Overwatch patch included a new emote for D.Va in which she sits in her mech playing a shoot 'em up game while eating chips and drinking a soft drink, alluding to the meme. Lead hero designer Geoff Goodman stated, "we love Gremlin D.Va," when speaking on Blizzard's favorite fan interpretation of characters. Katherine Cross of Gamasutra noted that many versions of the meme were "queer [and] aimed at the game's LGBT fanbase". D.Va is one of Overwatch's most frequently-included characters in fan-produced pornography, with her "Black Cat", "Cruiser", and "Academy" skins all being cited by Polygon's Cass Marshall as being popularly featured in such works. After the release of Overwatch 2, searches for D.Va on Pornhub rose considerably.

In South Korea, D.Va has been used as a representative of the National D.Va Association, later renamed as FAMERZ, a group of South Korean Overwatch players that support women's and LGBTQ rights which was formed to protest against former South Korean President Park Geun-hye. The group uses D.Va-related logos as demonstration material, with some appearing during international coverage of the 2017 Women's March in January 2017.

FAMERZ have, however, criticized some of the character's cosmetic skins, such as "Academy", based on a Japanese school uniform, and "Black Cat", based on gothic lolita fashion, saying that they sexualize and project too much male desire onto a character that otherwise represented Korean women well. The group also expressed concern that the skins' Japanese inspiration caused her to be conflated with women from other Asian countries, reinforcing misogynist and racist attitudes. D.Va's "Officer" skin received backlash from fans in the Black Lives Matter movement, who saw it as a symbol of police brutality, though others noted that the uniform was South Korean rather than American.
