= Bignic =

Musician and independent video game developer

- Born: Nicholas Gorissen
- Occupation(s): Game developer, musician
- Notable work: Zombies; Corporate Lifestyle Simulator; Domina
- Style: Big beat, house, pop
- Website: www.thebignic.com

Nicholas Gorissen, also known as Bignic, is an indie game developer and independent musician. His video games are released under his company Dolphin Barn Incorporated, based in Quebec, Canada, where he was the only employee as of 2017.

He once joked in 2010 that he chose Bignic ("Big Nick") as his alias because he was "6'4 and 400lbs".

== Games ==
Zombies for Windows and iOS was released in 2012. The game was renamed to "Corporate Lifestyle Simulator" in 2014 and re-released with additional content.

In 2017, Gorissen released Domina, a gladiator management game. Rock Paper Shotgun praised the game for its soundtrack.

== Controversies ==
In March 2022, the patch notes of a Domina update contained a message recommending people not to wear face masks during the COVID-19 pandemic. This caused a backlash from the community and the game was review bombed on Steam, making its recent reviews rating drop to "overwhelmingly negative". This was following earlier patch notes containing messages against Internet pornography, and followed by transphobic statements. Gorissen reported several of the reviews, which he labelled as "fraudulent" and an "orchestrated campaign of lies," but Steam moderators chose not to remove them. Gorissen consequently announced in August 2022 that Domina was unlikely to receive future updates on the platform.

In September 2022, a new Domina update contained transphobic comments and personal transphobic insults about Keffals, a Twitch streamer. Steam delisted Domina citing "insults targeting another person," "various rule violations" and announced "ending [their] business relationship with 'Dolphin Barn Incorporated' and removing all associated products from sale."

== See also ==
- Dolphin's Barn, a suburb of Dublin, Ireland
