= Bad Dragon =

American sex toy manufacturer

Bad Dragon Enterprises, Inc.
- Industry: Sex toys
- Founded: June 2008; 18 years ago
- Founders: Jan "Varka" Mulders; Brian "Athus Nadorian" Dyer; "Narse"; "Raith"
- Headquarters: 901 W Melinda Lane, Phoenix, Arizona, U.S.
- Area served: Worldwide
- Website: bad-dragon.com

Bad Dragon Enterprises, Inc. is an American manufacturer of fantasy-themed sex toys, primarily targeted at members of the furry fandom. Products are sold online and at conventions.

The CEO of Bad Dragon, Jan "Varka" Mulders, also owns the booru e621 (and its safe for work database mirror e926) and the role-playing website F-List, both of which also cater to furries.

== History ==
Bad Dragon was founded in June 2008. Jan "Varka" Mulders, one of the four co-founders (the others being Brian "Athus Nadorian" Dyer, "Narse", and "Raith"), had begun making sex toys in his university dormitory in Scotland the previous year. The company is now based in Phoenix, Arizona.

On March 20, 2024, Bad Dragon filed a federal lawsuit in Arizona against another toy company in New York, alleging that said company was plagiarizing Bad Dragon products.

== Products ==
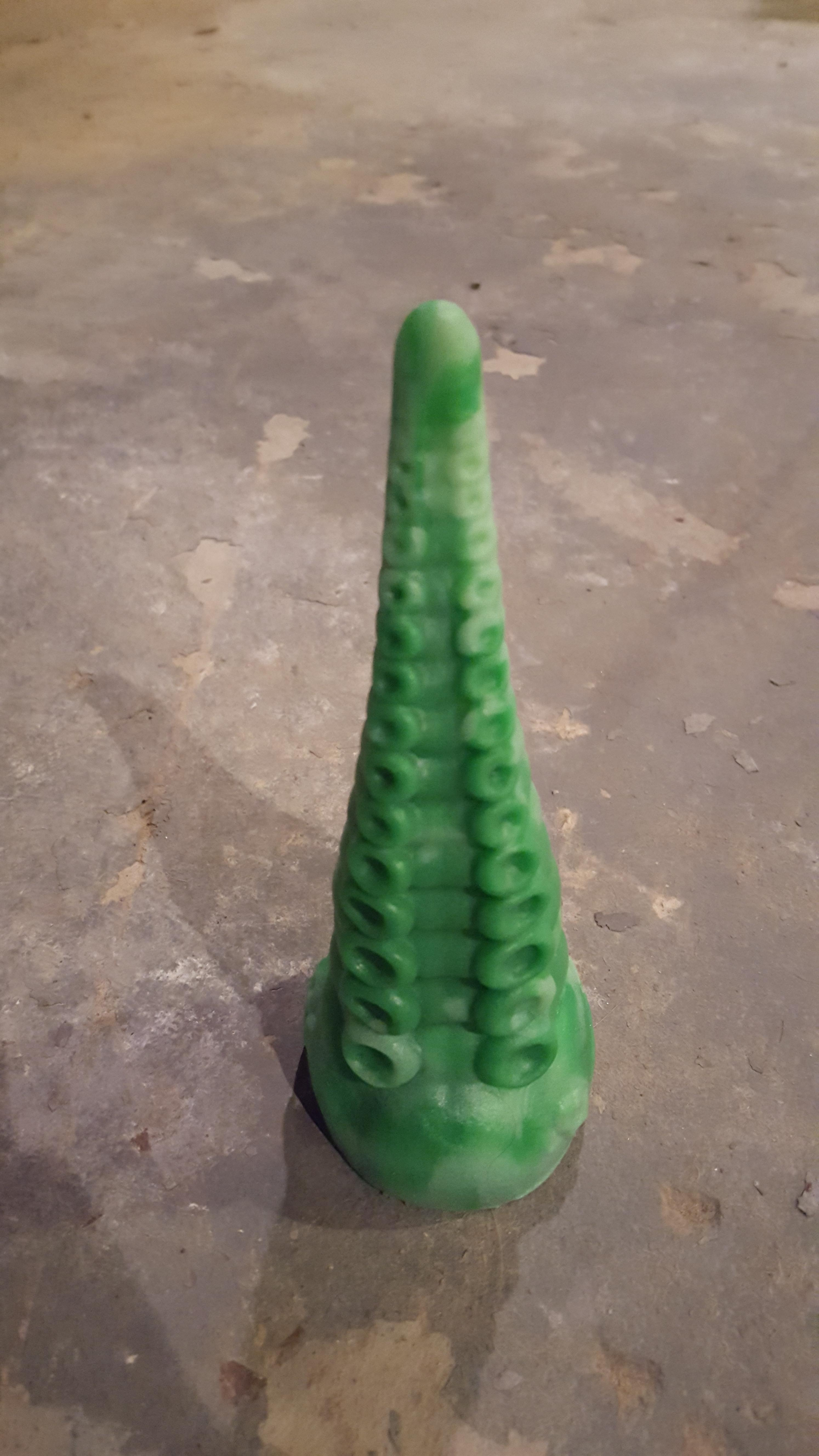
An example of a generic fantasy dildo with the animal characteristics of a tentacle

The company's products are primarily fantasy themed, with the creatures emulated including dragons, horses, orcas, chimeras, and werewolves. The website formerly featured a 'biography' of the characters each toy was based upon, alongside an illustration; as of August 15, 2017, this feature is only accessible by registered users, with listings for unregistered viewers displaying only pictures of the sex toy in question and details about its physical attributes. Bad Dragon also offers a 3-D interactive model to view certain areas of each toy.

Customers can also submit their own designs, some of which are chosen for limited production.

== Sponsors ==
In 2022, a race car driven by Mick Blue and sponsored by Bad Dragon won a National Auto Sport Association Time Trial.

== In popular culture ==
The nerd culture documentary Traceroute featured an interview with Jan "Varka" Mulders, one of the co-founders of Bad Dragon.
