= Dominia =

Dominia may refer to:

- Dominia (band), a Russian melodic death metal band
- Dominia, one of the cable-laying ships that produced the All Red Line
- The original name for the Multiverse, the fictional universe of Magic: The Gathering

== See also ==
- Domina (disambiguation)
- Dominica, an island country in the Caribbean
