= Pokémon and pornography =

Pornography of the media franchise Pokémon

Pokémon, a media franchise developed by Game Freak and published by Nintendo, has received a notable amount of fan-made pornography (also known as poképorn). The Pokémon games feature Pokémon trainers and creatures known as Pokémon; both are subject to pornography. The content can be usually found in imageboards such as e621, Rule 34, and Pornhub.

In 1999, in what was named the Pokémon doujinshi incident, a Japanese artist was arrested for producing erotic doujinshi of the Pokémon characters, inciting media fury. In the late 2010s, Pokémon-themed live-action porn parodies received media attention and, after the release of Pokémon Go in 2016, searches for pornography of the franchise increased significantly. Pokémon species such as Lucario, Lopunny, and Gardevoir are particularly known for being sexualized.

== Context ==
Developed by Game Freak and published by Nintendo, the Pokémon franchise began in Japan in 1996 with the release of the video games Pokémon Red and Blue for the Game Boy. In these games, the player assumes the role of a Pokémon Trainer whose goal is to capture and train Pokémon.

Pokémon pornography, also shortened as "poképorn", can involve either the Pokémon trainers or the Pokémon themselves, and can present interspecies acts between both. The Pokémon can either show human characteristics, known as "anthro", or show more animalistic features, known as "feral". The content can be in the form of drawings, on imageboards like Gelbooru or e621, or animated, live-action and 3D videos, on websites like Pornhub. Erotic Adobe Flash games related to Pokémon also exist. Collections of Pokémon pornography can be found on websites like DeviantArt, Twitter, Pixiv, and Newgrounds, and could be found on Tumblr before its nudity ban. There are also Reddit communities dedicated to sharing Pokémon pornography, the main subreddit being r/PokePorn. Lolicon and shotacon content related to Pokémon also exists, though it is banned on many websites. Erotic Pokémon-related fan fictions also exist. Artists may use Patreon to monetize their work and share exclusive content.

== History and popularity ==
In 1999, in what was named the Pokémon doujinshi incident, an artist was arrested on suspicion of violating Japan's copyright laws for creating a manga featuring erotic acts between Pikachu and Ash Ketchum, the main characters of the Pokémon anime. According to copyright holder Nintendo, the manga was "destructive of the Pokémon image". The incident incited media furor as well as an academic analysis in Japan on the copyright issues around doujinshi. In the late 2010s, live-action porn parodies received media attention, such as the 2015 parody Strokémon, the 2016 Pokémon Go parody by Brazzers, Pornstar Go XXX Parody, and the VR porn parody of Pokémon Go, Poke a Ho: Misty. Chuck Tingle, an author of gay erotica, released a book called Pokebutt Go: Pounded By 'Em All.

After the release of Pokémon Go on July 6, 2016, Pornhub reported on the 11th that searches for Pokémon porn had increased to 136%, with men being 62% more likely to search for the term and it being 336% more popular among 18–24 year olds. The data showed that Latin American countries were far more likely to search for Pokémon porn. Porn website xHamster reported the same day that the most searched terms since the release of Pokémon Go were "Pokemon", "Pikachu", "Hentai", and "Anime". YouPorn said that "Pokemon" became a more popular search term than "porn" on their website.

In December 2018, Pornhub Communications Director Chris Jackson said that the top three Pokémon-related searches were Gardevoir, Eevee, and Lopunny, with top humans being trainers Misty and Serena, as well as Team Rocket's Jessie. According to Vice, the dominance of Gardevoir and Lopunny is reflected on other websites, with Lucario not far behind. In June 2023, data compiled on Rule 34 websites Rule34.xxx and Sankaku Channel showed that Pokémon was the most pornified media franchise, with a large lead after the others. It also showed that the Pokémon themselves were preferred over the trainers, with the top choice being Lucario, followed by Gardevoir. Fan made erotica often depicts Gardevoir with human sexual aspects, such as breasts and/or fetish attire.

== See also ==
- Clop (erotic fan art) – My Little Pony pornography
- Overwatch and pornography – Pornography of the video game franchise Overwatch
- Rule 34 – Internet slang regarding pornography
- Furry pornography – Pornography of anthropomorphic animal characters
