= Domina (Overwatch) =

Fictional character in the Overwatch franchise

- Overwatch character
- Domina's appearance in Overwatch
- First game: Overwatch (2026)
- Designed by: Daryl Tan
- Voiced by: Taj Atwal

In-universe information
- Class: Tank
- Nationality: Indian

Domina, real name Vaira Singhania, is a character who first appeared in the 2023 video game Overwatch, a Blizzard Entertainment–developed first-person hero shooter. She is voiced by Taj Atwal.

== Conception and design ==
Domina was created by Blizzard Entertainment for their first-person hero shooter Overwatch 2, designed by concept artist Daryl Tan, and part of a five character group introduced in the game at once to reinforce a new narrative direction for the retitle following its rebranding to just Overwatch. As she had similar origins to another character, Symmetra, Tan wanted to emphasize this aspect as well as her visual appeal. Establishing her in the lore as a company CEO, they incorporated imagery of her having personal assistants constantly at her side by having two large independent robotic arms that hovered behind her that also serve the same purpose as Symmetra's cybernetic arm. Domina's gameplay concept was built around the idea of a character who could generate destructible panels, with the subsequent skills developed to better leverage this idea.

When developing the character's audio, they remixed Symmetra's existing sounds, with the team incorporating as much as they could to keep a similar feel reflecting Vishkar Industries, the company both characters are involved with in the lore. Aesthetically, they wanted to ensure her abilities sounded "high end and luxurious", adding melodic synthetic notes while sampling recordings of jewelry clinking together or a glass being grabbed. Her ultimate ability, "Panopticon", deviated from this by incorporating snarling particle sounds to help give it a lethal feeling.

Domina is a tall and curvaceous Indian woman, with black hair stylized into a bob cut, while the very front part is a golden blonde. Tan stated when designing her, he considered what kinds of clothing a company head would wear. Art director Dion Rogers added while Domina is shown in the game's story to be part of its villain faction Talon, her appearance and role were meant to reflect her as more of an entrepreneur.

== Appearances ==
Domina, real name Vaira Singhania, is the British Indian heiress of Vishkar Industries and its vice president of operations and development. In all appearances, she is voiced by Taj Atwal.

Her main weapon is a Photon Magnum with high-impact rounds. Using hard light, she can create a temporary, multi-faceted shield, use sonic repulsors to push enemies away and into obstacles to take damage, and create a charged crystal that she can later activate to cause a small explosion. Her ultimate is the Panopticon, a shield that flies forward and encases all nearby foes, within a radius, blocking their damage and healing and preventing external healing sources, exploding when it expires.

== Critical reception ==
Domina was well received. Spencer Perry of ComicBook.com expressed that her fashional presentation brought a unique visible style that had been absent in Overwatch, and called her "built not only on being chic in appearance, but also never getting her hands dirty". Chaping XPIN via the Tencent news portal expressed their surprise at her appearance and popularity, stating that while a good looking character will not immediately retain players on its own, it certainly drew attention. They further called her overall well designed, and questioned if Blizzard had poached artists from competing hero shooter Marvel Rivals. Jade King of TheGamer stated that while she was critical of some of the design choices of Overwatch characters, she felt Domina illustrated progress in being portrayed as an incredibly strong and confident Indian woman who "owned her looks" like previously successful Overwatch female characters, and further wanted to see more characters "across the spectrum of culture and attraction that don’t fill the same predictable demographic".

The staff of Chinese media outlet GamerSky.com attributed Overwatch's renewed popularity in part to her introduction as a "dark skinned mature woman". They further described her as having a "mature and charismatic 'voluptuous older sister' style" and a figure "full of strength", while stating that elements such as her "Heartbreaker" emote cosmetic suggested she had a rare tender side that resonated with fans. They further observed how some fans viewed characters like Domina as part of a renewed focus by Blizzard to develop traditionally attractive characters, with mixed response. Noting the company had previously been praised for pushing back against female character stereotypes, they suggested such a shift may have been due to Rival's success, citing fan comparisons of Domina to its depiction of Emma Frost.

Domina's sex appeal became a popular subject amongst players, resulting in a large amount of fan art and videos. Chaping XPIN noted that upon release her character model was almost immediately extracted for use in community generated pornography, while third-party figure company PA Created Studio developed a statue of the character featuring an eroticized design. Kaan Serin of GamesRadar+ stated that during the game's "Conquest" event, a faction war event where players would support either Overwatch or Talon in weekly batches, the latter saw overwhelming support from players hoping to secure in-game cosmetics for the character. He attributed it to players being "down bad" for the character, a which he describe as "shady business exec with a sassy mouth and, as the name suggests, a moveset capable of dominating tight spaces" that he felt further encouraged much of her fan art.

Simon Cardy of IGN meanwhile attributed much of her popularity more to her gameplay, which he felt helped revitalize the title for him. Elaborating, he described her shield as a particularly smart approach in how specific sections of it could be destroyed, making it feel balanced for both the user and enemies alike. Cardy enjoyed how it allowed both teams to utilize it tactically, and avoided the pitfalls in game design shields had previously caused in the game when utilized alongside turret-base allies. While he admitted that many of her skills may feel overpowered at the time of writing, how they stacked together felt both referential of the game's earlier eras yet simultaneously still fresh. He praised the developers for their attention to detail, and hoped they could keep this momentum going forward.
