= Kemonā =

Concept equivalent to furry fandom in Japan

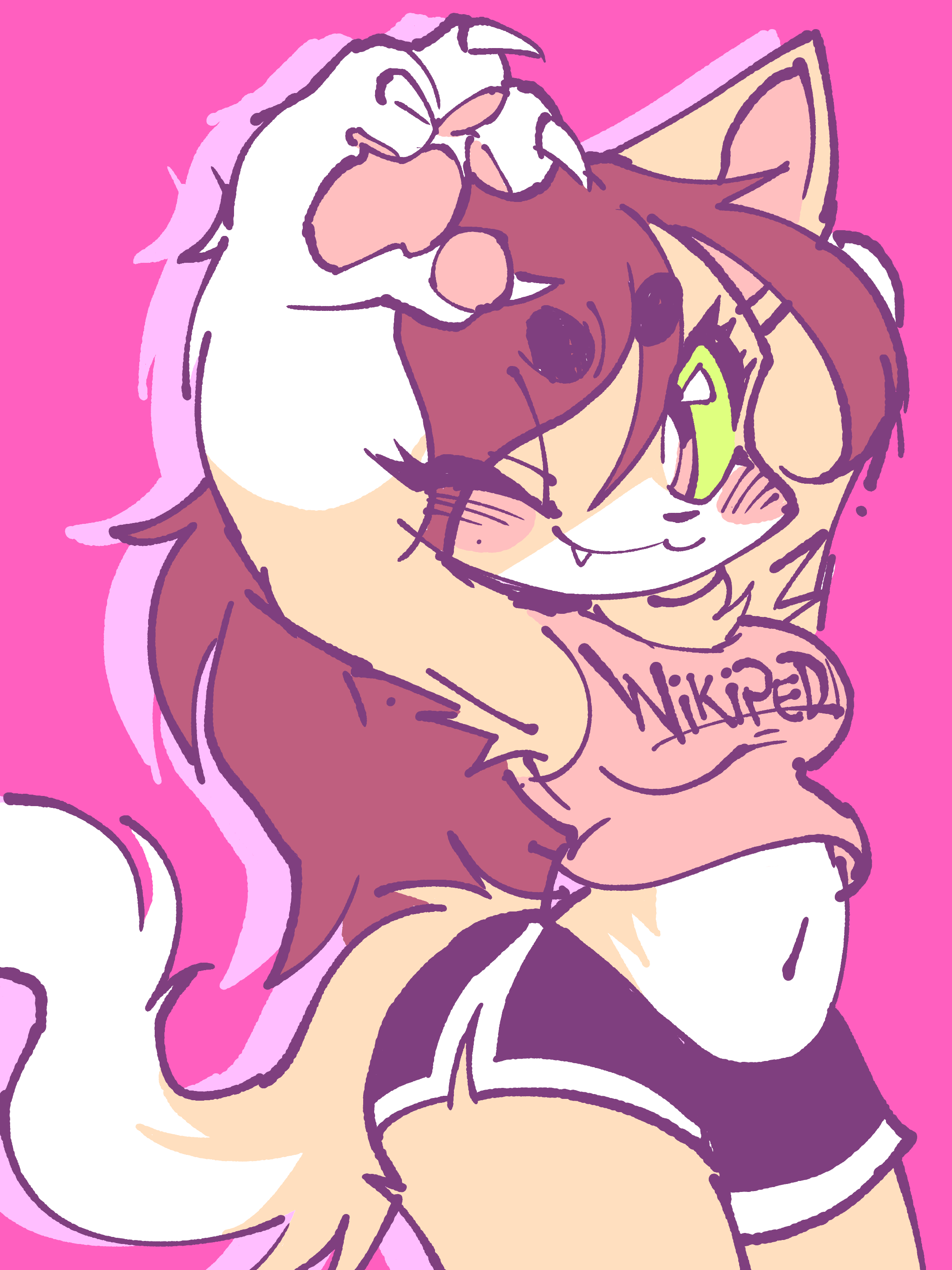
A kemono character, exhibiting animal features such as a muzzle and fur

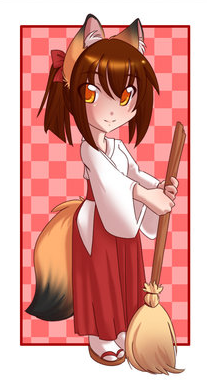
A kemonomimi character, exhibiting animal features only in the ears and tail

Kemonā (Japanese: ケモナー) is a Japanese subcultural term used to describe people who are fond of anthropomorphic animal characters, which are referred to as kemono (Japanese: ケモノ). These terms emerged during the late 1990s within the manga doujin culture, and they are sometimes claimed to have gained popularity when the term was used in the PlayStation 2 game .hack//G.U., released in 2000s. Interaction among kemonā initially revolved around doujin conventions, but with the proliferation of the Internet, the fandom has expanded to encompass various online art communities and social networking services. As per a 2013 article, the fandom has at least several thousand members.

== Definition ==
In Japanese subcultures, human characters with animal features such as ears and tails are often created, but they are not considered to be kemono. Criteria for identifying kemono often include the presence of a muzzle on the face and an animal-like appearance of the body surface. According to researcher Inokuchi Tomohiro (Japanese: 猪口智広), this is due to the recognition of "disconnection from humans" as a crucial factor that distinguishes between kemono and non-kemono. Inokuchi notes that while they are concerned with whether or not a character has a personality, they are rarely concerned with the amount of rationality or wildness within the personality. He then defines kemono as "an animal that is depicted as a non-human being, but with the potential for mutual understanding with humans."

=== Controversy on definition ===
Although those who are fond of kemonomimi character are also referred to as kemonā, this sort of usage is often controversial as a misuse of the term. This is because those who identify themselves as kemonā basically do not like the idea of being identified with lovers of animal ears.

In 2015, a personal blog introduced Kemono Friends, a smartphone game app featuring kemonomimi characters, as "for kemonā." A poster of the article included the sentence "I didn't realize that I was a kemonā, but it seems that I am." This caused an uproar, and finally the blog operator posted an apology. Inokuchi speculates that the fact that many kemonā do not view their identity and the term kemonā in a positive light might have contributed to the flaming. Kemonā may consider kemono characters as sexual objects, but there is a strong tendency for this to be equated with bestiality and considered taboo, which is why the term kemonā is often used in a negative sense. Combined with the strong internal orientation of Japanese doujin fandom, fans themselves have rarely actively made their fetishism public. This is believed to be one of the reasons why this fandom was not well known in Japan.

== Culture ==
As few commercial works deal with kemono, many of them create original characters and stories. Fursuit culture is also popular.

=== History ===
The terms kemono and kemonā were coined in the 1990s, but due in part to the Pokémon doujinshi incident in 1999, in which an artist who drew an erotic doujinshi about Pokémon was arrested, no kemono-only conventions were held until the 2010s. This is in contrast to kemonomimi-only convention Mimiketto (Japanese: みみけっと), which was first held in 2000.

Some of kemonā's most representative conventions include Kemoket (Japanese: けもケット), which was held in 2012 for the first time. As for events related to fursuits, Transfur (Japanese: とらんすふぁ) has been held since 2005 under the title of "first transfur event in Japan" and its de facto successor Kemocon has been held since 2007. In a 2013 interview, Inokuchi stated, "Originally, there was not much of a direct connection between the community that gathered at doujinshi sales and the community that liked fursuits, but these events have made this cohesion visible, and a new kemono culture is emerging that integrates them both."

=== Commercial work ===
CyberConnect2, a game development company credited with popularizing the term kemonā, launched the Kemono Project and sells anthologies and merchandise. YOS Corporation, which sells Kemonohime, a sex doll for kemonā, realized during commercial research that there were no adult products targeting kemonā, and created it as the "ultimate adult goods" for them.

== See also ==
- Moe anthropomorphism
- Furry fandom
- List of catgirls and catboys
