= Nanoblock =

Line of construction toys manufactured by Kawada

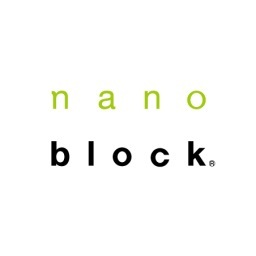
- Type: Construction set
- Company: Kawada
- Country: Japan
- Availability: 2008–present
- Official website

Nanoblock (Japanese: ナノブロック, Hepburn: Nanoburokku) is a line of construction toys manufactured by Kawada, a toy company based in Tokyo, Japan.

== History ==
Nanoblock was first introduced into the Japanese market in 2008 by Kawada. Nanoblock is distributed overseas by local companies, including Schylling in the United States and Mark's Europe in France and Benelux. In 2012, imports of Nanoblock reached 31 countries.

In 2010, Nanoblock won an Outstanding Performance Award in the High Target category at the Japan Toy Awards for the deluxe edition set based on Neuschwanstein Castle. The following year, Nanoblock won the Grand Prize in the High Target category at the 2011 Japan Toy Awards for their model of the Tokyo Skytree. In 2012, Nanoblock won the Brand License Award at the 2012 Licensing of the Year Awards.

== Sets ==
The Nanoblock range includes original designs and licensed sets. Kawada is currently releasing four original series. The Miniature collection series features miniatures designs of animals, musical instruments and Christmas themes. All sets contain around 80 to 150 pieces. The Sights to See series includes designs of world landmarks and notable buildings with sets ranging in size from 200 to 600 bricks. The Advanced Hobby series also features notable buildings and landmarks but on a larger scale. The sets in the series are all over 2,000 pieces. The largest set is Neuschwanstein Castle deluxe edition, with 5,800 pieces. The fourth series is aimed at girls with themes including weddings and birthdays.

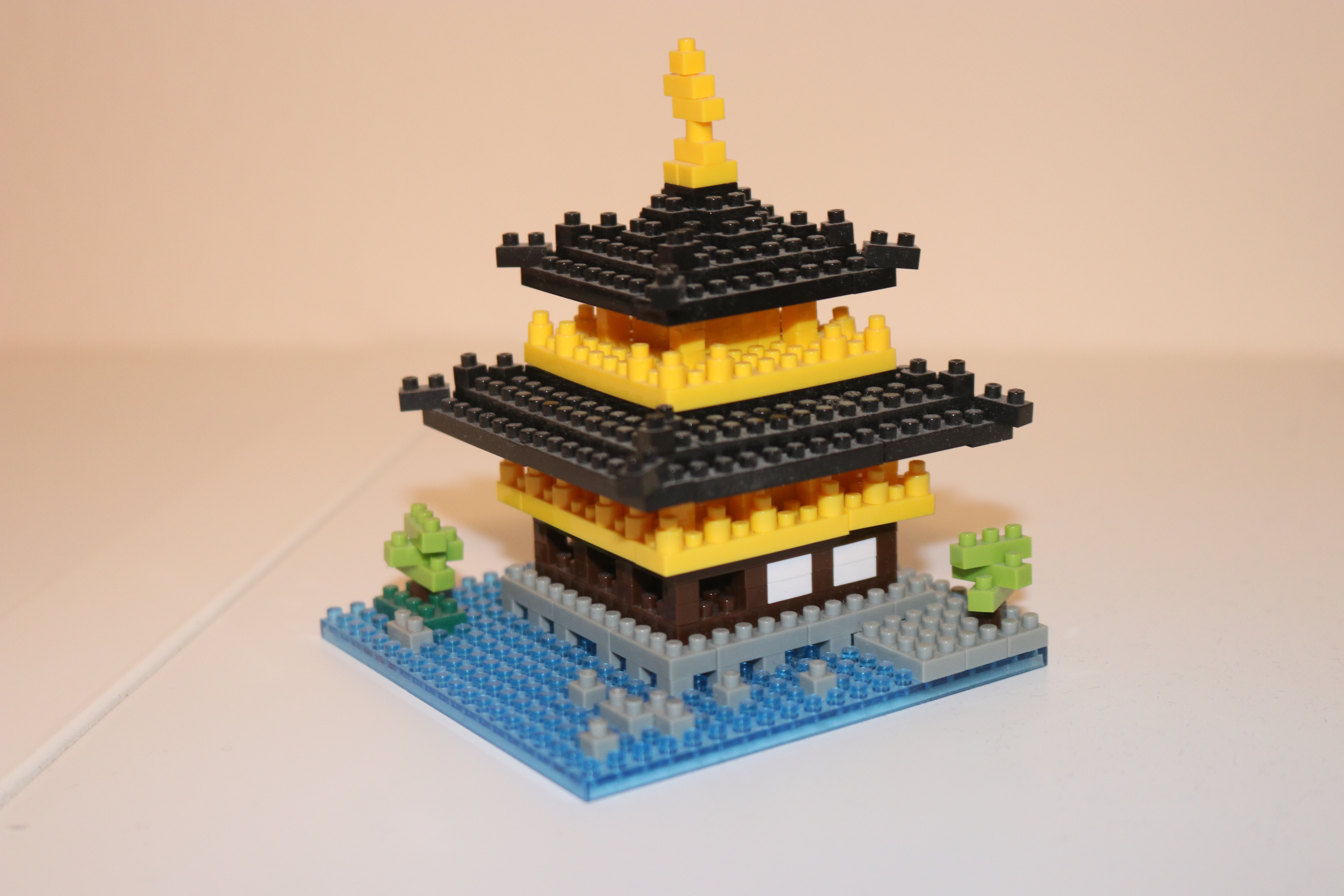
A Nanoblock set depicting the Kinkaku-Ji temple

Kawada has created sets based on various licenses including The Adventures of Tintin, Pokémon, Shaun the Sheep and Sanrio characters including Cinnamoroll, Hello Kitty, KeroKeroKeroppi and My Melody. A series of sets based on Disney characters is sold exclusively at the Tokyo Disneyland and Tokyo DisneySea theme parks. In 2013 it was announced Kawada would produce two sets based on Capcom's Mega Man video game franchise as part of the series' 25th anniversary. In 2015, four sets based on characters from the video game franchise Street Fighter were released. The four characters produced were Ryu, Chun-Li, Guile and Dhalsim. Also in 2015, camera giant Nikon partnered with Kawada to recreate its Nikon F camera in a set.

== Design ==
Nanoblocks are similar in design to a Lego brick but smaller, with the smallest brick being 4 mm × 4 mm × 3 mm, not including the stud. The bricks are 1/8 the size of Kawada's Diablock line of bricks. The underside of the bricks are different from Lego bricks because they use a dividing flange, known as the double-ridged backing system, instead of the tube system that Lego employs. The bricks are made using ABS plastic and there are eleven different types, the biggest being an 8×2 brick and the smallest a single stud brick.

Nanoblock sets typically include spare pieces.

== Reception ==
Wired described Nanoblock as an affordable alternative to Lego, but noted the small pieces were easily lost.
