= Fur Affinity =

Furry-centric art website

- Official logo since February 1, 2021, designed by Sciggles
- Company type: Subsidiary
- Website type: Art display Social networking service
- Available in: English
- Founded: January 16, 2005; 21 years ago
- Area served: Worldwide
- Owners: Ferrox Art LLC (2007–2015); IMVU LLC (2015–2021); Frost Dragon Art LLC (since 2021)
- Key people: Sean "Dragoneer" Piché (lead administrator [2007–2024], site owner [2007–2015, 2021–2024]; deceased); Susan "Sciggles" Hess (director of operations [since 2012], site owner [since 2024])
- Website: www.furaffinity.net sfw.furaffinity.net
- Registration: Optional (required to upload content or view adult content)
- Launched: December 10, 2005; 20 years ago
- Current status: Active

Fur Affinity (also written as FurAffinity) is a furry-centric art community that hosts artwork, literature, photography, and audio recordings. It was launched in 2005 by a pseudonymous individual using the moniker "Alkora" and was owned by Sean "Dragoneer" Piché through his limited liability corporation Ferrox Art from 2007 until 2015 when it was purchased by virtual world platform IMVU, and then again through a second LLC, Frost Dragon Art, from 2021 until his death in August 2024. Since Piché's death, the site is currently owned by his ex-wife Susan "Sciggles" Hess through Frost Dragon Art.

Fur Affinity features both standard furry art and adult art, although registration of a free account is required to view the latter. The site has become the most well-known and used furry-based website since its launch, receiving around 20 million visits monthly.

== History ==
Prior to the launch of Fur Affinity, the most well-known furry-centric website was an art site called SheezyArt. In 2004, it was announced that SheezyArt would be disallowing adult art. Alkora, a SheezyArt user, decided to launch Fur Affinity in January 2005 as a site that was open to adult art, along with non-adult art.

The original version of Fur Affinity was challenged with numerous security breaches and hacks. On August 1, 2005, due to a disagreement with the server provider and the lead coder, Fur Affinity was shut down. After a brief fundraiser to support a new server, Fur Affinity was relaunched on December 10.

Fur Affinity would continue to face server issues for the next few years. In 2007, site-runner Sean "Dragoneer" Piché's account was breached, which caused the site as a whole to go down for 2 days. In 2008, the site was taken down for over a month due to a "server hardware fault", and another fundraiser was set up in order for servers to be replaced.

In 2011, Fur Affinity merged with fellow furry-centric site, Furocity. In 2013, the site had achieved a total of 10 million posts. In 2015, FurAffinity was purchased by 3D software platform IMVU.

In 2016, Fur Affinity's source code was leaked, causing many users' personal data to be compromised. The site was immediately taken down as a result, and users were ordered to reset their passwords. In 2017, around 600 bot accounts posted graphic imagery of gore, once again causing the site to go down.

In February, Dragoneer announced that he had regained ownership of the website, and formed the limited liability company Frost Dragon Art. In 2022 the site took a stand against artificial intelligence-generated artwork, stating that AI-generated works lacked "artistic merit" and were not welcome on the site. In 2023, the site was banned in Russia due to "prohibited content". In the same year, it was reported that Shanghai Disneyland had included a picture from the site in a new City of Zootopia attraction without the artist's permission.

On August 6, 2024, Dragoneer died from complications of a lung infection. In a tweet before his death, he stated that he needed over $25,000 for a doctors appointment, while another showed $2,000. This meant delays in his critical care, leading to his condition getting worse. As of August 7, 2024, authorities were awaiting the results of a biopsy taken before his death to reveal the identity of the infection. His death incited criticism of the healthcare system in the United States.

=== 2024 hijacking ===
On August 20, 2024, the Fur Affinity website's domain records were compromised. The hacker redirected the domain to other sites, including a fake Shopify storefront mimicking the official website, a cryptocurrency scam, the then-officially-controlled Twitter account, a 2017 Washington Post article, and then Kiwi Farms. In response to the sudden influx of traffic, Kiwi Farms temporarily closed new user registrations and added a banner to the site claiming that the site's administration was not involved in the attacker's actions.

In response to the takeover, Fur Affinity invalidated all user logins to its website to mitigate the impact of the hack. On August 21, Cloudflare posted a warning on the domain that it had been reported for "possible phishing". Later that day, the Fur Affinity staff reported that they had regained control of the domain and were preparing to bring the site back online, but were concerned about a sudden influx of traffic causing further issues. The following day, staff announced that the site had been fully restored and was safe to use. They asserted that the site itself had not been compromised, and no private data had been accessed.

== Functions and content ==
Fur Affinity is an art community website, with a format similar to that of Newgrounds and DeviantArt. Newsweek described it as "the furry equivalent of Facebook." Registered users are able to upload artwork, animations, literature, photography, and audio recordings (including music). Users can also comment on posts, like them, and follow artists. Much like DeviantArt, users are able to create folders of their media, and can categorize uploads as "scraps". Fur Affinity also hosts Adobe Flash media and has integrated Ruffle into the site following the former's deprecation.

The minimum age for making an account is 13, and most artwork on the site is not safe for work. Posts marked as "not safe for work" are automatically restricted to registered users over 18, although many artwork whose themes are commonly seen as fetishes but not considered outright pornography have often gone unmarked by authors. Fur Affinity has a toggleable all-"safe for work" version of the site that does not show art that has been tagged as "adult". Under the "adult" filter, only media depicting adult characters are allowed, with pornographic/fetish content depicting underaged characters prohibited.

== Community ==
Fur Affinity is the most popular furry-focused website and has become both well-known and controversial in the furry fandom. It is used by furry community artists to promote their work. Since 2016, the website has offered banner advertising space to artists on the site in addition to the free public profiles that artists may use for self-promotion.

Fur Affinity formerly held a convention called "FA: United". The first convention was held in 2007, and was held yearly until 2020, when it was discontinued as a result of the COVID-19 pandemic.

Several of the site's controversies have stemmed from infighting and conduct between the admins and staffers, including long-time owner Dragoneer. Many users have migrated to other furry-centric websites, such as InkBunny, SoFurry, Weasyl, and Itaku as a result of the site's controversies. There have also been reports of alt-right furries, or "nazifurs", posting images on the website.

== See also ==
- Furry fandom – Subculture interested in anthropomorphic animals
