= HuCow =

Fetish that involves roleplaying as cows

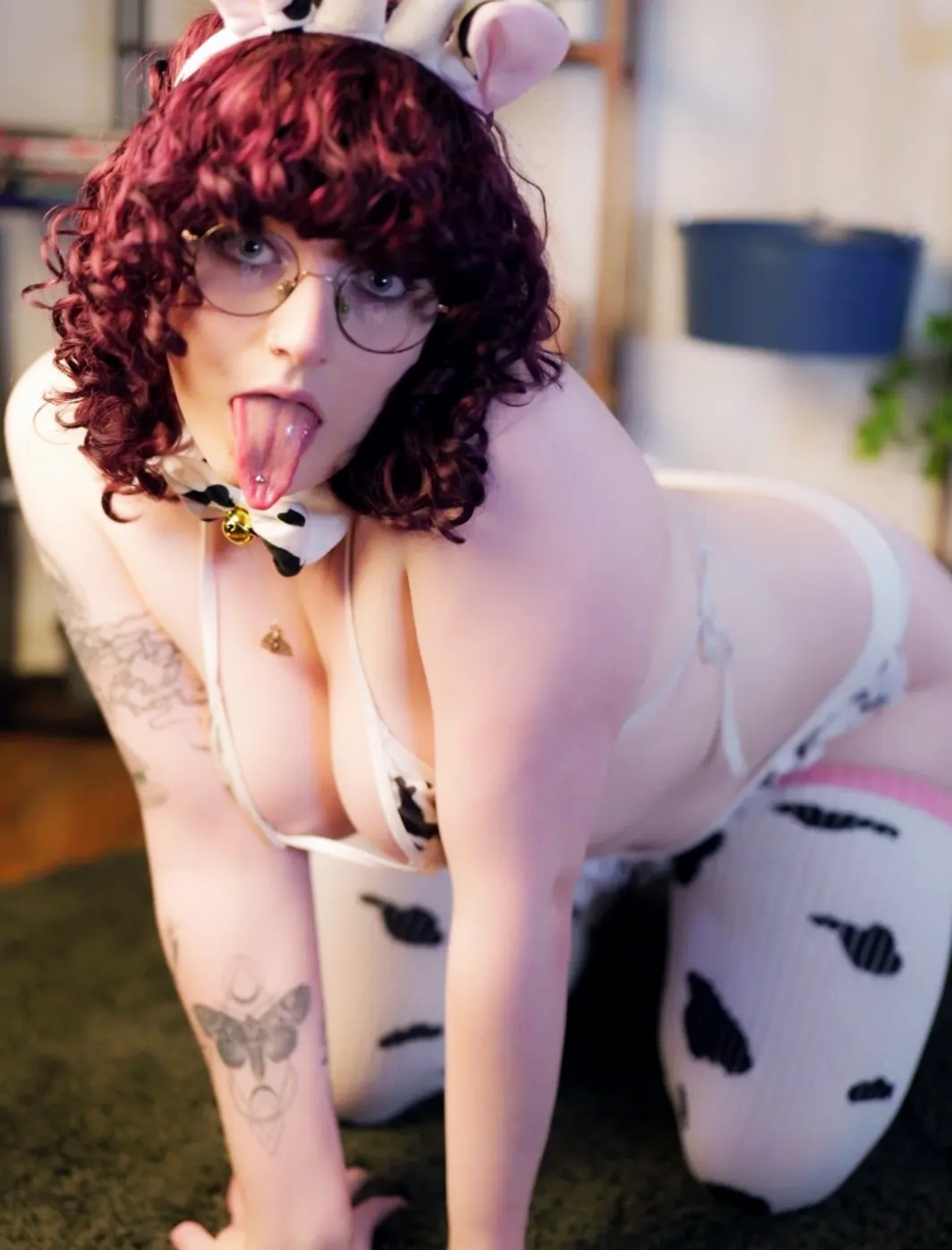
A woman posing in cow print stockings and lingerie while making an ahegao facial expression.

Human cow, or HuCow, is a BDSM subculture where people roleplay as dairy cows. Since the 2010s, it gained prominence through dedicated forums, fanart websites, and hentai repositories.

== Description ==
HuCow participants broadly consider themselves as cows or farmers. The cow is usually submissive and objectified by the farmer. Scenes are often centered around the farmer milking the human cow's breasts. Human cows are often portrayed with large-sized breasts or pecs, and as being able to lactate.

A popular trope in HuCow are settings which emulate the cattle industry, with names like The Dairy Department. Besides breast lactation, bondage is also prevalent in HuCow, where the human cow is bound by a harness to emulate livestock crushes.

A dominant partner can also be cattle. In that case, they are instead referred to as a bull or HuBull and often incorporate breeding fetish components in HuCow scenes. In the gay community, both milking the nipples and milking the penis of its semen are popular fantasies. HuCow is also related to pet play, but unlike conventional forms such as kitten play, it formed a more defined subculture with a less generic name.

=== Accessories ===
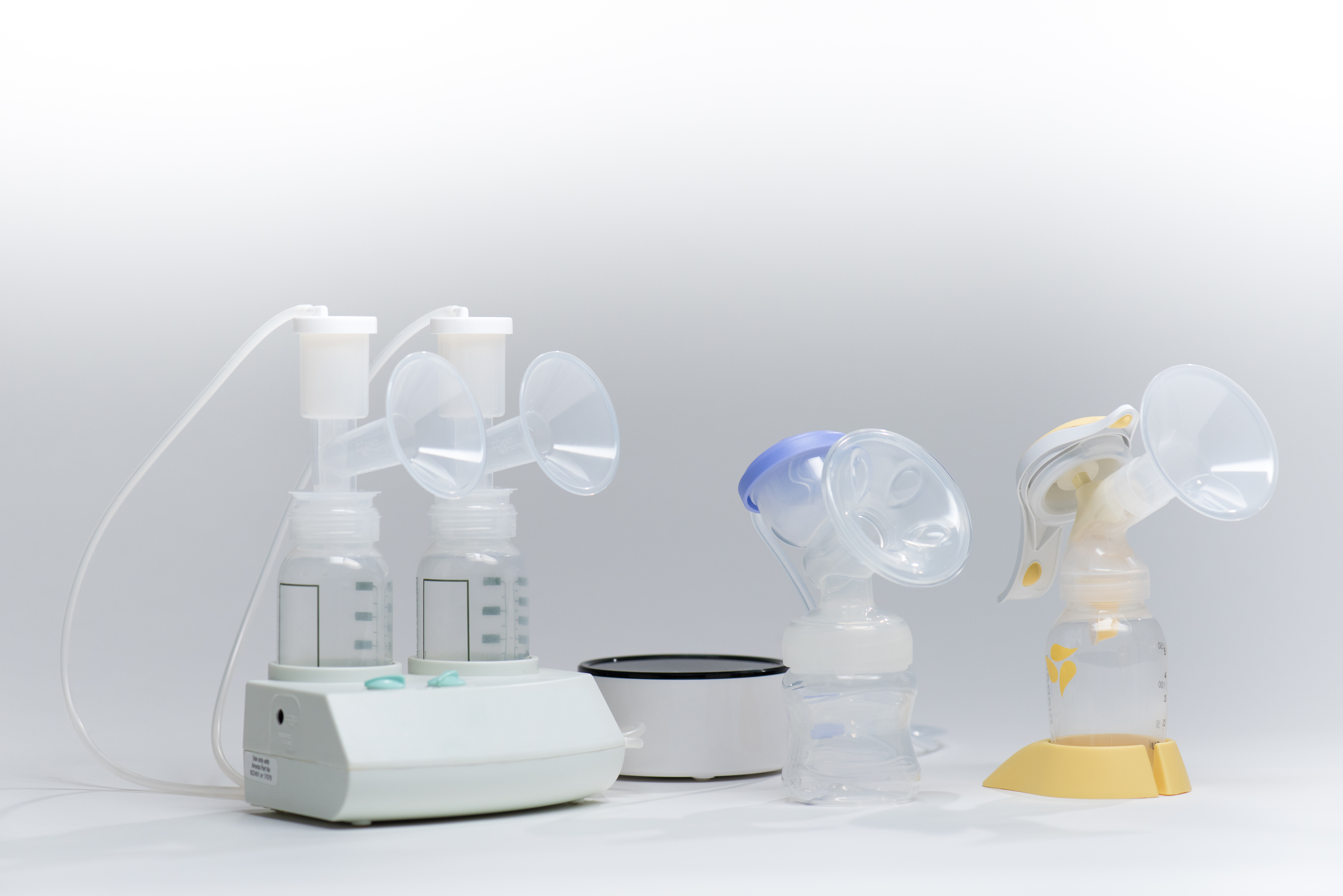
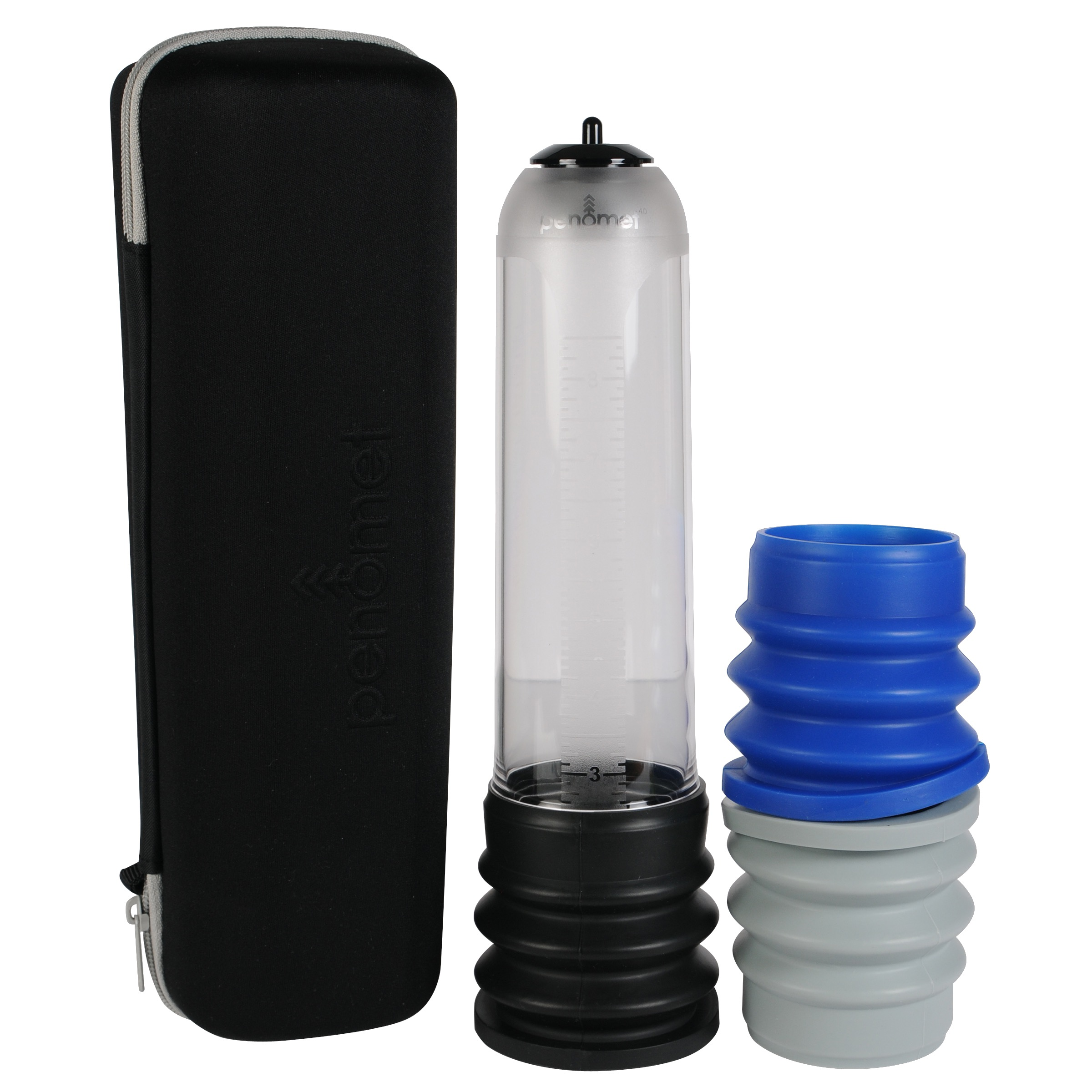
Breast pumps (left) and penis pumps (right) are popular accessories in human cow scenes.

Members of human cow communities also enjoy cosplay. Vendors on Amazon have started to offer products related to this community as the demand grew. Some accessories and costumes used by HuCows enthusiasts are:

- Cow-printed onesies, body paint or bikinis
- Cow-eared headbands
- Detachable tails
- Cattle ear tags
- Breast pumping machines and penis pumping machines.

== Prevalence ==
The modern concept of HuCow emerged in the early 2010s, but hentai porn has portrayed similar scenarios beforehand. HuCow participants span across all sexual orientations.

According to Justin Lehmiller, a research fellow at the Kinsey Institute, the fetish is popular with gay and bisexual man communities because it incorporates transformation fantasies and BDSM, both of which are well-represented in queer male communities. As of 2018, the dedicated HuCow subreddit had more than 23,000 subscribers and a popular HuCow Tumblr had more than 10,000 followers. Some porn studios are dedicated to HuCow, like hucows.com.

=== In media ===
The 2018 Doja Cat single "Mooo!" is credited with rousing public interest in cow-branded apparel and cow-related fantasies.

== See also ==
- Breast fetish
- Pup play
