= Overwatch and pornography =

Pornography of the video game franchise Overwatch

Erotic fan art featuring Mei. Alongside Tracer, Mei is often cited as one of the more popular characters in fan-made Overwatch porn.

Blizzard Entertainment's Overwatch video game franchise inspired a notable amount of fan-made pornography. The games' distinct and colorful character designs drew the attention of many online content creators, resulting in sexually explicit fanart. Character models were ripped from the beta versions of the game and subsequently spread, edited, and animated on the Internet.

Animated pornography shorts and sexualized imagery featuring official character models constitute the main content of Overwatch pornography. Original pornography fan artists (animators and illustrators) are most commonly based on social media platforms such as Twitter, and Reddit. Pornographic content is created primarily through Valve's Source Filmmaker (SFM) and Blender.

Overwatch pornography usually consists of short pieces of video featuring characters such as Tracer, D.Va, and Mei. Blizzard initially issued cease-and-desist orders to some prolific creators through an independent security firm, though the game's director described the situation as "an inevitable reality of the internet in 2016." Video game journalists have described the abundance of (pornographic) fan works as a positive indicator for the game's longevity. Pornographic works of the game remained a topic of discussion long after that game's release, with artists making content of the game's post-launch characters, and Overwatch-related search topics continuing to be popular on porn websites.

Overwatch and its pornographic community has inspired various groups and companies to produce adult content related to the game. Brazzers produced a "porn parody" based on Overwatch in September 2016. The website Overpog.com started producing a Playboy-style magazine about the game in late 2016, until they were forced to stop in February the following year. Overwatch has inspired both sexualized cosplay and pornographic virtual reality works.

== Background and history ==
Overwatch is a 2016 multiplayer online shooter game developed by Blizzard Entertainment. The game sports a cast of various characters, each with a unique design. Pornographic fan works of online multiplayer games like Overwatch has always been relatively common: according to Pornhub vice-president Cory Price, the most popular video-game related search queries on Pornhub were Minecraft, Halo, Clash of Clans, and Call of Duty. Aoife Wilson of Eurogamer asserted that a cursory search on websites like Pornhub reveals pornography inspired by many high-profile video game franchises.

Overwatch entered a closed beta in late 2015, during which time various people ripped the character models of Overwatch from the game and spread them over the Internet. In early 2016, Blizzard also encountered some controversy with the design of a victory pose for the game's cover art character, Tracer, which was criticised by some fans as "[reducing her] to just another bland female sex symbol." When Blizzard made an open beta of Overwatch available on May 5, 2016, Pornhub registered a spike of 817% in searches for pornographic material related to the game. Searches for Overwatch pornography originated somewhat evenly worldwide, though South Korea and Belarus searched for such content the most. According to Jeff Grub of VentureBeat, websites such as Tumblr were overflowing with sexualized fanart of the characters at the time.

The game managed to become iconic ... before it had even been released, and it's thanks entirely to the game's indelible character design and sui generis artistic flair. There is more fanart for this game than you could even imagine.

— James Stephanie Sterling

Nathan Grayson of Kotaku stated that Overwatch makes for "good porn" because of its colorful cast of characters with distinct visual styles. Grayson pointed out that the game features a higher-than-average number of female characters, many of which wear skin-tight clothing. Grayson wrote that Overwatch pornography is relatively easy to make with Source Filmmaker, the community of which is built around the sharing of assets, including nude models. Many people who create and watch Overwatch pornography have not actually played the game.

Blender, another "free, open-source 3D computer graphics creation tool" is also used by such animators, with one being cited by Kotaku as stating, "Overwatch models are, for the most part, readily available for Blender, and some of them are very beginner friendly." Some artists have achieved popularity within their online communities, being able to capitalize on their SFM or Blender art and use it as a source of income via Patreon donations.

Overwatch director and lead designer Jeff Kaplan stated in an interview that he and his team have purposefully kept the romantic relationships and sexual identities of their characters vague in order to not "pander" to the audience. Kaplan described the porn scene as "an inevitable reality of the internet in 2016." When Randy Pitchford, CEO of Gearbox Software, tweeted about the existence of pornographic content based on Overwatch's competitor game Battleborn, he was immediately mocked and trolled by fans of the more popular game. Pitchford was accused of "desperately trying to put the spotlight back on his game", and the subreddit he linked to was flooded by Overwatch references.

In January 2017, Pornhub announced that "Overwatch" was the 11th-most searched term on their website in the previous year, beating out searches for words such as "anal" and "threesome". Pornography featuring the game's characters has remained popular years after the game's launch. D.Va, Tracer, and Mercy, ranked as the top three video game characters by number of searches on Pornhub in 2017, and the game was the most searched on the platform in 2019.

Post-launch additions of new characters to the game's playable roster, such as Brigitte and Ashe, propelled spikes in related searches. After Ashe debuted, searches for Overwatch in general more than doubled on Pornhub. In 2022, Chinese internet users circumvented the state's ban on pornography by using a wallpaper app, with Overwatch-related porn being among the most popular on the platform. Media outlets also continued discussing Overwatch porn in 2022, ahead of the release of the game's sequel.

== Pornographic content ==
Many of the Overwatch-related videos on Pornhub during the game's open beta featured the official models of the characters with some slight alterations to show more skin. Amateur animators then used the free Source Filmmaker tool by Valve to animate sexual activities. The character Tracer was by far the most commonly searched Overwatch-related subject during this time, followed by Widowmaker and Mercy. Futanari imagery was also popular among Pornhub users.

After the release of Overwatch's competitive mode at the end of June, the query "Mei Overwatch Rule 34" became the most popular search target related to the game. Mo Mozuch of iDigitalTimes called the popularity of Mei significant, noting that she initially wouldn't seem as a likely target and that much pornography of her is fairly body positive, describing exaggerations of her form as "more Venus of Willendorf than Barbie."

On September 12, pornography website YouPorn revealed that Tracer was the second-most searched female video game character on the site, behind only Lara Croft. In January 2017, Pornhub released a list of top Overwatch character searches over the previous year, revealing that Tracer, D.Va, Mercy, Widowmaker, and Sombra had been the top 5 most popular female characters on the website, and that Lúcio was the most popular male character on the website.

Most Overwatch pornography is only several seconds long and intended to loop indefinitely. Since the game's official release, various creators have experimented with longer and more elaborate story content. Though the characters each have a personal backstory, there is still a lot not known about them. According to Kotaku's Grayson, "by design, they can’t be fully fleshed out. There has to be room for player identity." The personalities of the game's characters have been noted to be taken into account in some pornographic animations. Most short character clips take known character traits to a sort of "logical conclusion", such as showing former pro gamer D.Va masturbating while streaming.

The superpowers and symbols of agency of the female characters are usually not integral to these fanworks, though Emily Gaudette of Inverse noted that Tracer is an exception to this rule, stating that this character "has achieved something not many other female characters in porn have: a unique personality that only adds to her sex appeal." Gaudette further stated that the majority of Overwatch pornography is "vanilla", suggesting that it is intended for a straight male audience. Kate Gray, writing for Kotaku, noted that the scenarios found in such pornographic animations "are pretty basic."

Commenting upon the pornographic content available on the Internet, Aoife Wilson of Eurogamer said that some of the videos are of surprisingly high quality, though she criticized that female characters were commonly portrayed in a submissive manner unless they are depicted with a penis. Grayson stated that most of the Overwatch pornography is bad, featuring unsettlingly rigid movements and amateurish camera angles. However, he also described good content as "legitimately sexy." Grayson also noted that there exists a lot of comedy in the Overwatch porn scene, with people creating humorous videos or writing silly descriptions.

In 2019, Gray commented on how Overwatch pornographic animations focus on women, rather than men, but praised the quality of these animations, opining: "sure, the boobs might be overly jiggly, and some of the gasps of pleasure are a little too close to sobs, but the animation is amazing—subtle movements of flesh and hair, detailed fabric simulations, lifelike surfaces, realistic lighting." Gray was critical of the culture surrounding the creators of such content, writing that the genre has "a lot of the same issues as the porn industry as a whole." She elaborated that "It's clear that the people making these videos are into a very specific, predominantly white, and almost always skinny version of women," citing changes made to some characters, such as Pharah and Brigitte being portrayed as whiter and slimmer, respectively, than in-game, and an under-representation of others. Sashacakies, an animator in the Overwatch pornography scene, also criticized the lack of diversity in the such content, but was unsure if its artists or consumers are to blame.

=== Erotica ===
Both Inverse and Kotaku suggested that the majority of Overwatch's Source Filmmaker pornography community consists of straight men. However, both websites noted that users on Tumblr and various fan-fiction websites produce large amounts of romantic erotica. These communities consist in large part of women and LGBTQ people more interested in emphasizing the existing bonds of the characters. James Grebey of Inverse called Tumblr "perhaps ground zero for extremely good fanart, heartwarming comics, and other steamy user-generated Overwatch content." Tumblr described Overwatch as "rife for shipping" due to its 20 unique characters. In May 2017, the website sifted through its data in order to determine which character pairings was the most popular on Tumblr, revealing that Cassidy (formerly called "McCree") and Hanzo (McHanzo) were shipped 35% of the time.

== Major works ==
Overwatch became the subject of a "porn parody" created by Brazzers in September 2016. Titled Oversnatch XXX Parody, the video features Danny D as Reaper and Aletta Ocean as Widowmaker. The parody presents a "grudge match" between the two characters in an abandoned strip club. Oversnatch XXX Parody was the first time Brazzers produced a parody of a video game, but they went on to do more afterwards.

After producing several mock Playboy covers, staff of the website Overpog.com decided to create an Overwatch-themed, Playboy-style magazine under the title Playwatch. This magazine does not include any nudity, some of the images being cropped or edited in order to remove nudity where it otherwise would be. The magazine also features fictitious articles and interviews with Overwatch characters, as well as real-life cosplay. Overpog completed the first issue of Playwatch in November and it drew a large audience from Reddit. Overpog told PVP Live that the sexual images in Playwatch "were intended to titillate and impress with artistic intent rather than overtly sexual," and that the magazine was first and foremost a parody of the famous magazine. In February 2017, Playwatch was shut down through a cease-and-desist order issued by a copyright firm hired by Blizzard Entertainment.

In 2017, cosplay artist Stella Chuu started a group effort of sexualized Overwatch cosplay under the banner "Underwatch". Chuu drew up cosplay designs of each Overwatch hero and got to work with a group in order to present the work at Katsucon 2017. This cosplay meetup was highly successful, drawing a large crowd, and the group was asked to leave or cover up by Katsucon staff about an hour in, at which point they moved to a suite in the local MGM Grand for a photoshoot. Chuu told Kotaku that "many of the cosplayers approached [her] afterwards to express how confident [the event] made them feel."

Cosplay pornography company BaDoinkVR planned to release multiple virtual reality pornography projects based on Overwatch in 2017. Producer Dinorah Hernandez stated that "in Overwatch, people get attached to the characters as they play them and the way they're designed amplifies sexual attraction."

== Reactions ==
When asked about the pornographic fan content, Kaplan stated that as someone who is "creatively responsible" for the franchise, he is concerned and hopes people realize many children play the game despite the T-rating. Regardless, Kaplan stated, "Nobody’s trying to step on anybody’s freedom of speech or any of that, like totally love people’s creative expression."

As Overwatch pornography primarily makes use of official character models with appended genitalia, takedown notices have been issued to creators of such content. These notices have been issued by security firm Irdeto, which, according to news outlets, may have been hired by Blizzard to clean up unwanted fan content. Blizzard itself has not yet commented upon the large Overwatch porn scene. After one creator posted a screenshot of one such takedown notice on a Reddit message board, other creators started to come together in order to pressure Blizzard to stop.

Prolific video game porn developer Studio FOW stated that it would not create Overwatch pornography after the studio got a cease-and-desist order from Blizzard in 2015 for their World of Warcraft–related projects. Writing in a blog post, the studio stated that "it's not a process I'm happy to repeat because I have better things to do than argue semantics all day with jumped up, tiny, hypocrite attorneys ... there are more important things in life such as looking out for my team and feeding families."

Both James Stephanie Sterling and VentureBeat's Jeff Grub described the abundance of fan works of Overwatch, pornographic or otherwise, as a good sign for the game's longevity. The influx of Pokémon-related pornography shortly after the release of Pokémon Go was compared to that of Overwatch.

== See also ==
- Rule 34 – Pornographic art of characters from non-pornographic media in general
- Clop (erotic fan art) – My Little Pony pornography
- Doujinshi – Japanese self-published print works
- Tijuana bible – Pornographic comic book
- Yiff – Pornography of anthropomorphic animal characters
