= Domina (video game) =

2017 video game

- Developer: Bignic
- Platform: Windows
- Release: April 3, 2017
- Genre: Simulation
- Mode: Single-player

Domina is a gladiator simulation video game developed by Bignic and released into early access through Steam on April 3, 2017. In the game, the player takes on the role of a woman who must manage her father's ludus and train gladiators in order to restore its reputation.

On September 2, 2022, Domina was removed from sale on Steam following several comments made by the developer in the game's update notes, which were interpreted as transphobic.

== Gameplay ==
Domina features both real-time combat and gladiator management, where the player can train and purchase new armor and weaponry. During fights, the player can control a single gladiator in order to combat hostile, AI-controlled opponents.

== Reception ==
Eurogamer Italia's Davide Pessach gave the game 8 out of 10, stating that "the experience is really fun". Nate Crowley of Rock Paper Shotgun called the game "ultra-brutal" and mentioned "wild balance issues", but concluded by praising the soundtrack, calling it "fucking spectacular". PC Gamer's Christopher Livingstone also praised the game, calling it "a lot of fun" but criticized the AI of allied gladiators.

== Controversy ==
On March 12, 2022, developer Bignic added an anti-mask message to Domina' patch notes, writing "Women don't like dudes who cover their faces in fear. What are you afraid of? Getting laid? Grow up." The game was subsequently review bombed by Steam users.

In early August 2022, Bignic was banned from Domina's Steam community forum. Later that month, all of Bignic's games were removed for sale from Steam due to the presence of comments interpreted as transphobic within Domina's patch notes, including insults aimed at transgender Canadian streamer Keffals.
