= Pokémon doujinshi incident =

1999 controversy

The Pokémon doujinshi incident (ポケモン同人誌事件) refers to the incident where a Japanese doujinshi artist who sold erotic manga of Pokémon in 1999 was arrested on suspicion of violating Japan's copyright laws, creating a media furor as well as an academic analysis in Japan of the copyright issues around doujinshi.

== Background ==
In August 1998, a Fukuoka City-based doujinshi artist created a doujinshi manga featuring erotic acts between Pikachu and Ash Ketchum, the main characters from the Pokémon anime, and sold it as a B5-size booklet. Distribution took the form of sending flyers to members of doujinshi fandom to advertise, and mailed to those who wished to receive them. Three companies including Nintendo, which hold the copyright, filed a complaint against the woman on 5 January 1999, and, eight days later, the Kyoto Prefectural Police Living Environment Division arrested her on suspicion of violating Japan's copyright laws. She was taken to Kyoto and detained for 22 days, and fined for selling five copies of the doujinshi at 600 yen each and possessing about 100 copies for distribution.

Also in March, a printing company in Aichi Prefecture was fined in 73,000 yen for suspicion of violating the copyright law (aiding and abetting) for printing 460 copies of the doujinshi. Until then, the production of non-profit, small-scale doujinshis had often been tolerated as part of fan activities, and this was the first time that the artists and printing companies had been exposed.

== Court and Nintendo's responses ==
Nintendo stated that it could not tacitly approve of the sale due to the sexual depictions of the characters, which could harm their image, and pointed that as the scale of doujinshi events has grown, the general public, including small children, has had more opportunities to come into contact with them. In addition to that, the fact that the specific doujinshi in question was sold through mail order and was easily accessible to minors due to it not being sold in person was cited as the reason for the legal action.

The reasons for the decision to file a criminal complaint without a warning included the following: "the doujinshi artist had been publishing parody doujinshi continuously for some time," "many doujinshi circles and authors use pen names, and there was no guarantee that a warning would be received," and "books like the one in question might be produced in an organized criminal manner". Based on their previous experience with pirated products, they decided that criminal prosecution was more appropriate than "time-consuming" warnings or civil lawsuits.

Hiroshi Imanishi, who was the head of Nintendo's Public Relations Office, commented that the company only happened to learn about the book through a fan's report and that he didn't have a general interest in doujinshi. He also stated that there was no intention to make an example of her about the issue. Yasuhiro Minagawa, Public Relations Section Chief, also questioned the doujinshi market at the time, which disregarded the rights of copyright holders.

== Impact ==
This was the first-ever arrest of a doujinshi artist, causing unrest in the amateur artist industry, where similar cartoons were created. Comic Market organizer and manga critic Yoshihiro Yonezawa said that parody production is an accepted form of fan activity that enhances anime and manga culture, and expressed concern that this incident could delegitimize expression without any discussion of "what kind of parody manga is allowed". In addition, Gataket organizer Fumihiko Sakata, feeling threatened by his own interrogation by the Kyoto Prefectural Police, launched the Japan Doujinshi Marketplace Network with Comic Market organizer Yonezawa, COMITIA organizer Kimihiko Nakamura and others. Due in part to this incident, no kemono-only events were held until the 2010s.

In 2013, manga artist Ken Akamatsu proposed the Doujin Mark to indicate that copyright holders have permission to engage in doujin activities. His proposal was based on a concern that copyright infringement would no longer be an antragsdelikt due to the Trans-Pacific Partnership Agreement, which could lead to similar incidents to the Pokémon one, in which a complaint by a third party led to criminal action.

== See also ==
- Pokémon and pornography
- Child pornography laws in Japan
