= Rule 34 =

Internet slang regarding pornography

The 2003 webcomic by TangoStari (Peter Morley-Souter) credited with coining "Rule 34"

Rule 34 is an Internet meme which claims that some form of pornography exists concerning every possible topic. The concept is commonly depicted as fan art of normally non-erotic subjects engaging in sexual activity. It can also include writings, animations, images, GIFs and any other form of media to which the Internet provides opportunities for proliferation and redistribution.

== History ==
The phrase Rule 34 was coined in an August 13, 2003, webcomic captioned, "Rule #34 There is porn of it. No exceptions." The comic was drawn by TangoStari (Peter Morley-Souter) to depict his shock at seeing Calvin and Hobbes parody porn. Although the comic faded into obscurity, the caption instantly became popular on the Internet. Since then, the phrase has been adapted into different syntactic versions and has even been used as a verb. A list of "rules of the Internet", created on the website 4chan, includes Rule 34 within a list of similar tongue-in-cheek maxims, such as Rule 63.

In 2008, users on 4chan posted numerous sexually explicit parodies and cartoons illustrating Rule 34; in 4chan slang, pornography may be referred to as "rule 34" or "pr0nz". The Dictionary of Modern Proverbs claims that Rule 34 "began appearing on Internet postings in 2008".

As Rule 34 continued spreading throughout the Internet, some traditional media outlets began reporting on it. A 2009 Daily Telegraph article listed Rule 34 as the third of the "Top 10" Internet rules and laws. A 2013 CNN story said Rule 34 was "likely the most famous" Internet rule that has become part of mainstream culture.

Fan fiction has parodied events such as the 2016 United States presidential election, the 2021 Suez Canal obstruction, and Brexit.

== Analysis ==
According to researchers Ogi Ogas and Sai Gaddam, the maxim resonated with so many people because of its apparent truth to anyone who has browsed the Internet. Ogas said that following the 2009–2010 study, the consolidation of the porn industry onto large market share video aggregators has reduced the visibility of the niche market videos. The sites favor mainstream content directly by steering users towards it and indirectly by disadvantaging small producers who cannot afford strong anti-piracy measures, bringing into doubt the ability of the rule being able to keep up with the market.

Cory Doctorow concludes, "Rule 34 can be thought of as a kind of indictment of the Web as a cesspit of freaks, geeks, and weirdos, but seen through the lens of cosmopolitanism, bespeaks a certain sophistication—a gourmet approach to life."

John Paul Stadler concluded that Rule 34 reflects the codification of paraphilias into social identity structures.

== Variations ==
The original rule was rephrased and reiterated as it went viral on the Web. Some common permutations omit the original "No exceptions."

- "Rule 34: There is porn of it."
- "Rule 34: If it exists, there is porn of it."
- "Rule 34: If it exists, or can be imagined, there is Internet porn of it."
- "Rule 34: If you can imagine it, it exists as Internet porn."
- "Rule 34(r): If it exists, there is a subreddit devoted to it."

== Corollaries ==
- "Rule 35: If there is no porn, it will be made."
- "Rule 36: There will always be more fucked up shit than what you just saw."
- "Rule 63: For every given male character, there is a female version of that character and vice versa."

== See also ==
- Cartoon pornography – Cartoon characters in sexual situations
- Clop (erotic fan art) – Pornography of My Little Pony characters
- Hentai – Anime and manga pornography
- Not safe for work (NSFW) – Internet slang term
- Overwatch and pornography
- Pokémon and pornography
- Pornographic parody film – Subgenre of pornographic films
- Rule 63 – Technique in fiction
- Furry pornography – Pornography of anthropomorphic animal characters
- List of Internet phenomena
