= Sex Life of Robots =

- Directed by: Michael Sullivan
- Produced by: Richard Skidmore
- Edited by: Richard Skidmore
- Release date: 2006
- Country: United States

Sex Life of Robots is an animated short film directed by Michael Sullivan and produced by Richard Skidmore. The film shows imaginary sexual activities among robots.

The plot of Sex Life of Robots is centered on a baby robot and a mother robot who are looking for pornography in the computer of their home. In this process, scenes of sexual intercourse among robots is shown in their computer screen.

Sex Life of Robots was made using stop motion animation technique. The design of the robots shown in the film were based on toys such as, among others, the fashion doll Barbie and the G.I. Joe action figures. The film was edited by its producer Richard Skidmore.

According to director Sullivan, "It's supposed to be like a silent robot porno movie from another planet." Although the film is a kind of pornography, according to Wired columnist Dylan Tweney, Sex Life of Robots "exhibits a high degree of artistry" which is full of "gritty, industrialized atmosphere". The New York magazine described the film as "art-porn". According to online news portal Terra Chile, the character of robot mother was inspired by American singer-songwriter and actress Debbie Harry.

A trailer of the film was uploaded on YouTube, but it was later removed because its pornographic nature created controversy. Sex Life of Robots was premiered at the Tribeca Film Festival in 2006.

The Tribeca Film Festival commented on the film, "Romance is swept aside by the mechanical imperative to inject robot sperm into robot eggs in this two-minute teaser of The Sex Lives of Robots. Lascivious machinery and a larger-than-life Deborah Harry robot drives this one-note plot to its inevitable climax."
