= Website footer =

Type of web element

In web design, a footer is the bottom section of a website. It is used across many websites around the internet. Footers can contain any type of HTML content, including text, images and links.

HTML5 introduced the <footer> element.

Common items that are included or linked to from footers are copyright, sitemaps, privacy policies, terms of use, contact details and directions.

Infinite scrolling cannot be used in combination with footers, because the footer becomes inaccessible.
