= Not safe for work =

Internet slang term

Not safe for work (NSFW), also known as not suitable for work, is Internet slang or shorthand used to mark links to content, videos, or webpages the viewer may not wish to be seen viewing in a public, formal, or controlled environment. The marked content may contain graphic violence, pornography, profanity, nudity, slurs, or other potentially disturbing subject matter. Environments that may be problematic include workplaces, schools, and family settings. NSFW has particular relevance for people trying to make personal use of the Internet at workplaces or schools that have policies prohibiting access to sexual and graphic subject matter. Conversely, safe for work (SFW) is used for links that do not contain such material, especially where the title might otherwise lead people to think that the content is NSFW.

The similar expression not safe for life (NSFL) is also used, referring to content which is so nauseating or disturbing that it might be emotionally scarring to view. Links marked NSFL may contain murder, gore, or certain fetish pornography.

Some platforms, such as Reddit, Twitter, Patreon, or DeviantArt have long offered users the option to designate their content as NSFW, in order to warn others of its explicit nature before they access it, as well as to algorithmically separate it from SFW content.

== History ==
It has been speculated that the term evolved from an earlier form originating on message boards, not for British school kids (NFBSK), which appears online as early as the year 2000. "NSFW" itself has been used in online communities since the early 2000s, with a definition being posted to Urban Dictionary in 2003. In 2009, it was suggested that a future version of HTML could include "NSFW" as a standardized tag for adult material on websites that could be automatically hidden depending on user settings.

By 2011, the term was common enough to be added to Oxford Dictionaries Online, with Merriam-Webster adding the abbreviation to its dictionary in 2015. The Oxford English Dictionary added the term in 2016, citing earlier evidence of usage from 2002.

== See also ==
- Internet filter – Software used to restrict access to unsuitable content
- Internet pornography – Any pornography that is accessible over the Internet
- Rule 34 – Internet slang regarding pornography
- Shock site – Website intended to offend or disgust its viewers
- Trash stream – Internet broadcast focused on extreme behavior
