= Furry fandom =

Subculture interested in anthropomorphic animals

Fursuiters at a furry meetup in Indonesia

The furry fandom is a subculture defined by an interest in anthropomorphic animal characters. Members of the fandom, known as furries, often identify with their own personalized characters known as fursonas, and may wear fursuits, engaging with fellow furries on the internet and at furry conventions. Art, literature, digital media, and music all play a part in the furry fandom's identity and interests. Though much of the furry fandom's history and studies on the community have centered on the United States, furry communities exist worldwide.

Terms for the fandom originated in the 1980s, though portrayal of anthropomorphic animals had existed previously in culture and literature. Socialization between members of the furry fandom grew through the development of the Internet, particularly through websites and services such as FurryMUCK, DeviantArt, Fur Affinity, and Telegram. The first furry conventions started through the efforts of artists and anthropomorphic animal fans at science fiction conventions in the 1970s, at which time highly anthropomorphized characters were known mainly as funny animals. Furry conventions have since grown to host thousands of attendees, have varying economic impact on their host cities, and are often associated with charities. In the 2020s, furries became strongly associated with the information technology industry.

Furries have been derided extensively by media outlets and online communities, becoming the target of physical threats and political attacks. While some furries engage in the subculture primarily through sexual activities, many portrayals of furries' sexuality are characterized as exaggerated and associated with a negative perception. Stigma against furries has led to individuals hiding their furry identity from friends, family, or coworkers. The furry fandom is largely male-dominated, but a significant portion of the fandom identifies as transgender, outside the gender binary, or both. Some members of the community identify as partially non-human; those who identify this way are more often associated with the therian subculture or otherkin, which may not necessarily overlap with the furry fandom.

== Definition ==
Depictions of anthropomorphic animals have existed for thousands of years, one example of which being the ancient Egyptian god Anubis.

Members of the furry fandom, furries, are generally described as individuals who are interested in anthropomorphic animal characters. Some examples of anthropomorphic attributes include exhibiting human emotions, speaking, and wearing clothes, though the term itself is defined simply as attributing human characteristics to non-humans, and all of these attributes are not necessary. For instance, any non-human character that is depicted as feeling complex emotions can be considered anthropomorphic, regardless of whether it speaks or walks upright. Anthropomorphism and its significance in human culture greatly predates the advent of furries as they are now; imagery of human figures with animal anatomic features are known from engravings and cave paintings that date to the Upper Paleolithic period. Having fur is not a prerequisite for a character to be considered "furry", though alternative terms may be used to distinguish subsets of the community; for example, a person interested in anthropomorphic reptiles may be considered a "scalie", but would remain part of the furry fandom regardless of their preferred species.

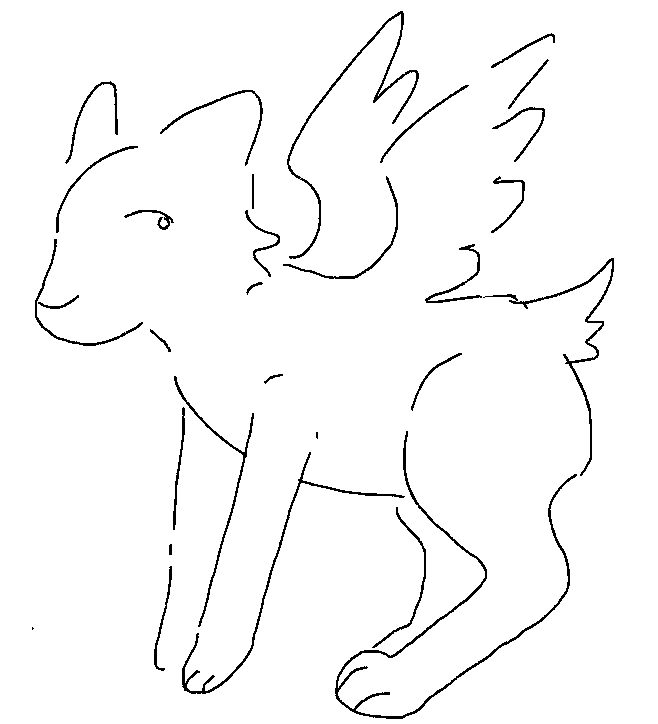
A feral character

An anthropomorphic character that has the anatomy of a regular animal is described as "feral"; these characters are relatively unpopular within the community. Members of the fandom are more likely to describe being furry as being part of a community organized around an interest in anthropomorphic animals rather than having the specific interest on its own; studies on the fandom have found that there is no one accepted definition of "furry" within the group. Those who most strongly identify as furry are more resistant to the idea of the furry fandom being considered part of or lumped together with other fandoms, such as the anime and manga fandom. Members of the furry fandom distinguish the group as unique compared to other fandoms because of how it centers on an "aesthetic interest", rather than interests related to aspects of an established canon; however, furries participate in activities common between different fandoms like performing cosplay, hosting conventions, and producing fan art. Furthermore, furry aesthetics derive a great deal of inspiration from American and Japanese animation, and furries are more often invested in representations of animals in media than they are in the biology of real-world animals; greater associations between the individual and non-human animals are more often seen in the therian community.

== History ==
The history of the furry fandom is largely documented by furries, and this documentation often aims to depict the fandom in a positive light; many furry authors tailor their works with the intent of being seen by other furries, and may omit narratives that make parts of the subculture seem unpalatable. The furry subculture originates in the 1970s with a group of "original furries", most of which were men, who individually had an interest in anthropomorphic animals and congregated to watch sci-fi and anime titles. This early period of the furry fandom was largely documented by fandom historian Fred Patten.

The logo for FurryMUCK, a furry-based virtual environment founded in 1990

Mark Merlino and Rod O'Riley are credited with starting the first room parties for furry socialization that evolved into the later concept of furry conventions. Merlino had held screenings of cartoons featuring anthropomorphic animals since 1977, and in 1985 at Westercon, Merlino and O'Riley held a themed room party where Looney Tunes episodes and Animalympics were shown. The event was a success, and the two continued to hold similar parties at different conventions. At the following year's Westercon, the event was branded as a "furry party", and such events soon took off at different science fiction and fantasy conventions. By 1989, there was sufficient interest to stage the first furry convention, Confurence 0, which was held at the Holiday Inn Bristol Plaza in Costa Mesa, California. Once the Internet became accessible to the general population in the 1990s, it became the most popular means for furry fans to socialize. The newsgroup alt.fan.furry was created in November 1990, and virtual environments such as MUCKs also became popular places on the internet for fans to communicate, with the most prominent of these being FurryMUCK.

The first works uniquely associated with the furry fandom were created in 1976, when cartoonists Ken Fletcher and Reed Waller created the amateur press association Vootie, which was dedicated to animal-focused art. Many of its featured works contained adult themes, such as "Omaha" the Cat Dancer, which contained explicit sex. Vootie was at first distributed only through local conventions and Fletcher's contacts, but grew a small following over the next several years. The publication ran for 37 issues from 1976 to 1983 and was succeeded by the amateur press association Rowrbrazzle, which was active from 1984 onwards. According to Patten, the concept of furry originated at a science fiction convention in 1980, when a character drawing from Steve Gallacci's Albedo Anthropomorphics started a discussion of anthropomorphic characters in science fiction novels. This led to the formation of a discussion group that met at science fiction conventions and comics conventions.

The specific term furry fandom was being used in fanzines as early as 1983, and had become the standard name for the genre by the mid-1990s when it was defined as "the organized appreciation and dissemination of art and prose regarding 'Furries', or fictional mammalian anthropomorphic characters". Prior to this point, these anthropomorphic animals were generally referred to as funny animals, a term used in comics since at least the 1870s. Internet newsgroup discussion in the 1990s created some separation between fans of funny animal characters and furry characters, meant to avoid the baggage that was associated with the term "furry". Some fans consider the origins of furry fandom to be much earlier, with fictional works such as Kimba, the White Lion, released in 1965, Richard Adams's novel Watership Down, published in 1972 (and its 1978 film adaptation), and Disney's Robin Hood being oft-cited examples.

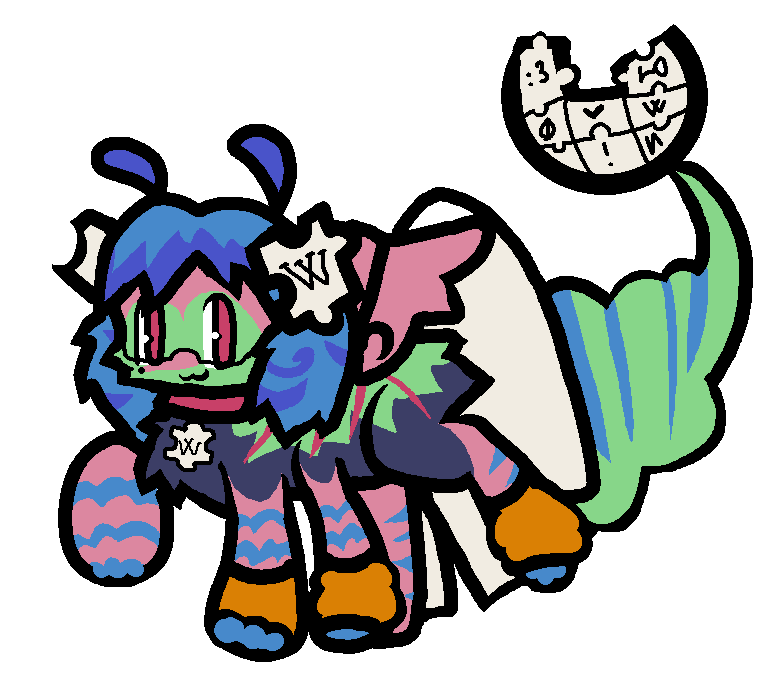
An example of a sparkledog

During the mid- to late 2000s, furry art became associated with art sharing sites such as DeviantArt. Many furries who created characters or fursonas during this period would design brightly colored dogs or wolves, leading to the coining of the commonly derisive term "sparkledog". This period marked significant growth within the fandom, and members frequently saw abuse from other online communities. Public media began to focus on the furry fandom, largely through lenses of sex-obsession or a complete identification with animals. By the 2010s the fandom had become more strongly associated with the LGBTQ community, and attacks on the latter started using furries as targets. During this period, groups that embraced far-right politics emerged in the furry fandom; the largest growth of these groups, identifying as "altfurry" or "Furry Raiders", occurred in 2017. Furry influencers have become more prominent through social media like TikTok during the 2020s, with some describing it as a means to "take the furry community mainstream". As of 2023, the most popular furry website was FurAffinity, an art sharing website and forum. The messaging program Telegram is the preeminent way furries communicate with each other, and social media sites like Twitter, Discord, and Reddit remain popular sites in the furry fandom.

== Inspiration ==
Allegorical novels, including works of both science fiction and fantasy, and cartoons featuring anthropomorphic animals are often cited as the earliest inspiration for the fandom. A survey conducted in 2007 suggested that when compared with a non-furry control group, a higher proportion of those identifying as furries liked cartoons "a great deal" as children and recalled watching them significantly more often, as well as being more likely to enjoy works of science fiction than those outside of the community. Designs associated with the furry fandom are largely informed by American and Japanese animation.

While cartoons and other media are common routes that lead to interest in the furry fandom, by far the most common source of exposure to furries is the internet. This is contrasted with sports fans, who are generally more likely to become fans due to the influence of friends or family. Some furries have expressed a feeling that they were always a part of the fandom, but did not know it until they were exposed to others in the community; others discover the fandom through research into media or ancient mythology, through happenstance, introduction by a friend or significant other, online role-playing, or pornography. Individuals remain in the fandom for various reasons, but the most prominent motivation among those surveyed is a sense of belonging in the fan community.

== Activities and interests ==
According to a survey from 2008, most furries believe that visual art, conventions, literature, and online communities are strongly important to the fandom. While the most straightforward interest of furries remains the anthropomorphic characters themselves, artwork, paraphernalia (such as fursuits, leashes, collars, accessories, and other costume pieces), conventions, and furry events remain strong interests within the fandom in subsequent surveys.

=== Crafts ===
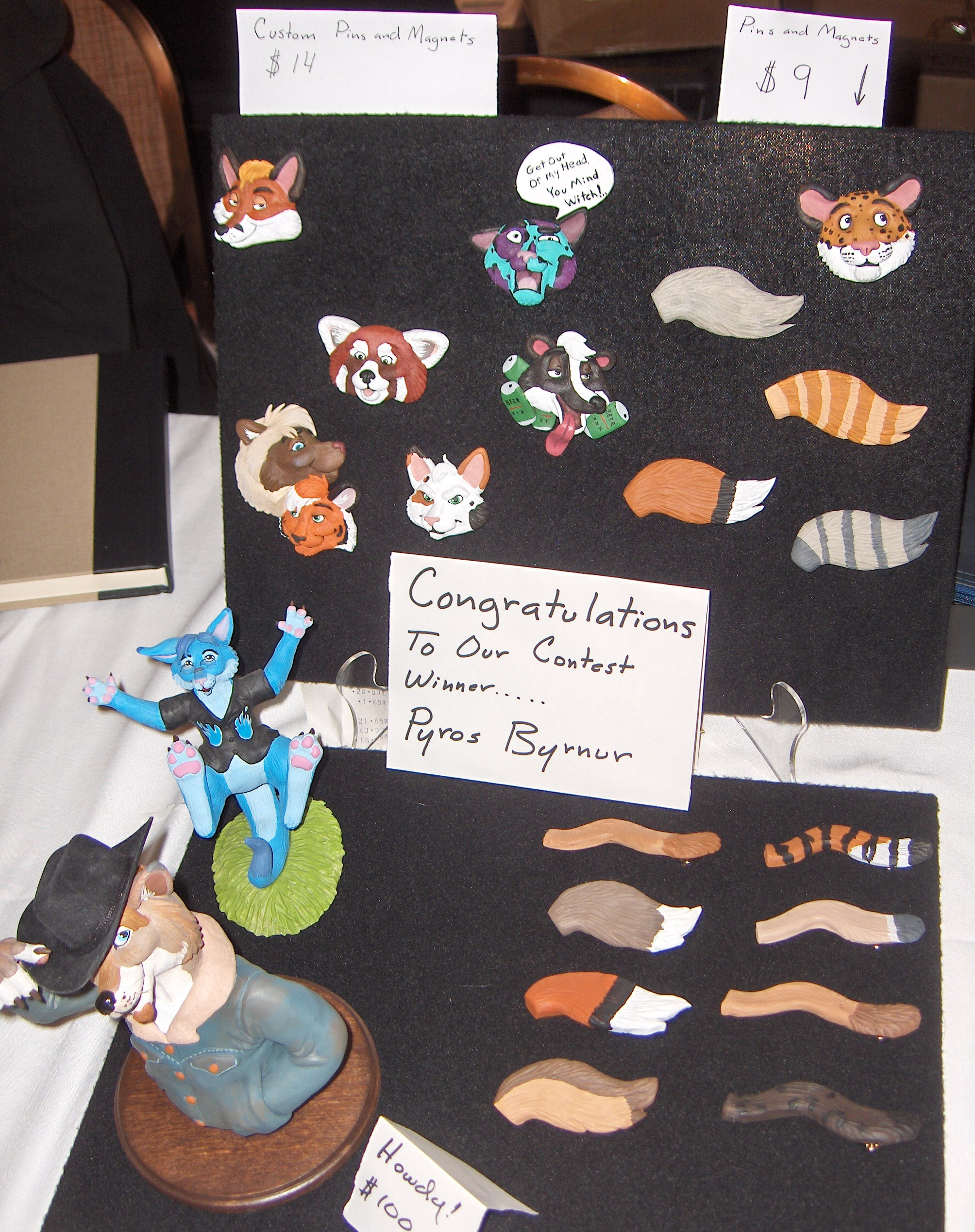
Sculptures and pins on display at Further Confusion, a furry convention

Fans with craft skills create plush toys and also build elaborate costumes called fursuits, which are worn for fun or to participate in parades, convention masquerades, dances, or fund-raising charity events (as entertainers). Fursuits range from designs featuring simple construction resembling some entertainment and sports mascots to those with more sophisticated features such as moving jaw mechanisms, animatronic parts, prosthetic makeup, and other features. Complete fursuits typically range in price from about $1000 for a simple design to upwards of $6,600 for models incorporating digitigrade legs, which require additional padding and sculpting. Some fans may also wear "partial" suits consisting simply of ears and a tail, or a head, paws, and a tail. Surveys from the late 2000s indicated that about 80% of furries do not own a full fursuit, but later surveys from 2016 to 2020 found that the number of fursuit owners ranged from one-quarter to one-third of those surveyed. A much larger proportion of individuals who attend conventions own a full or partial fursuit—45%, according to a survey done at Anthrocon 2018—which has been attributed to convention attendees' generally higher likelihood of being able to afford to buy a fursuit if they can afford convention travel expenses.

Furries also pursue puppetry, recording videos and performing live shows such as Rapid T. Rabbit and Friends and the Funday PawPet Show, and create furry accessories, such as ears or tails. Besides ears and tails, many furries make and sell less overtly animal-themed items, like charms and beaded bracelets.

=== Role-playing ===
A cartoon anthropomorphic vixen, an example of a furry character

Anthropomorphic animal characters created by furry fans, known as fursonas, have historically been used for role-playing in MUDs, on internet forums, or electronic mailing lists. A variety of species are employed as the basis of these personas, although many furry fans (for example over 60% of those surveyed in 2007) choose to identify themselves with carnivorans. The longest-running online furry role-playing environment is FurryMUCK, which was established in 1990. Another popular online furry social game is called Furcadia, a long-running massively multiplayer online role-playing game that was continuously updated from 1996 to 2016. Other games that can be used as online chatrooms, such as VRChat, have been used to facilitate furry role-playing.

=== Art, websites and online communities ===
The Internet contains a multitude of furry websites and online communities, such as art community websites Fur Affinity, Inkbunny, SoFurry, and Weasyl; and WikiFur, a collaborative furry wiki. Furry news websites include Flayrah and Dogpatch Press. Art involving furry characters is a key component of furries' engagement with the fandom, which contributes to the popularity of websites that mainly function as galleries like Fur Affinity.

There are several webcomics featuring animal characters created by or for furry fans; as such, they may be referred to as furry comics. One such comic, T.H.E. Fox, was first published on CompuServe in 1986, predating the World Wide Web by several years, while another, Kevin and Kell by Bill Holbrook, has been awarded both a Web Cartoonists' Choice Award and an Ursa Major Award. Sabrina Online, a webcomic by Eric W. Schwartz that began in 1996, won a Web Cartoonists' Choice Award and features a tech-savvy anthropomorphic skunk named Sabrina as the namesake protagonist. Webcomics featuring anthropomorphic animals make up a significant subset of amateur comics online, with many being published on DeviantArt and Reddit.

The Ursa Major Award is given in the field of furry fandom works and is the main award in the field of anthropomorphism. It has been awarded to media in various forms, including animated works like Helluva Boss (2021), Beastars (2020), and Zootopia 2 (2025), video games like Webfishing (2024) and Cult of the Lamb (2022), and fiction and non-fiction literature.

=== Conventions ===
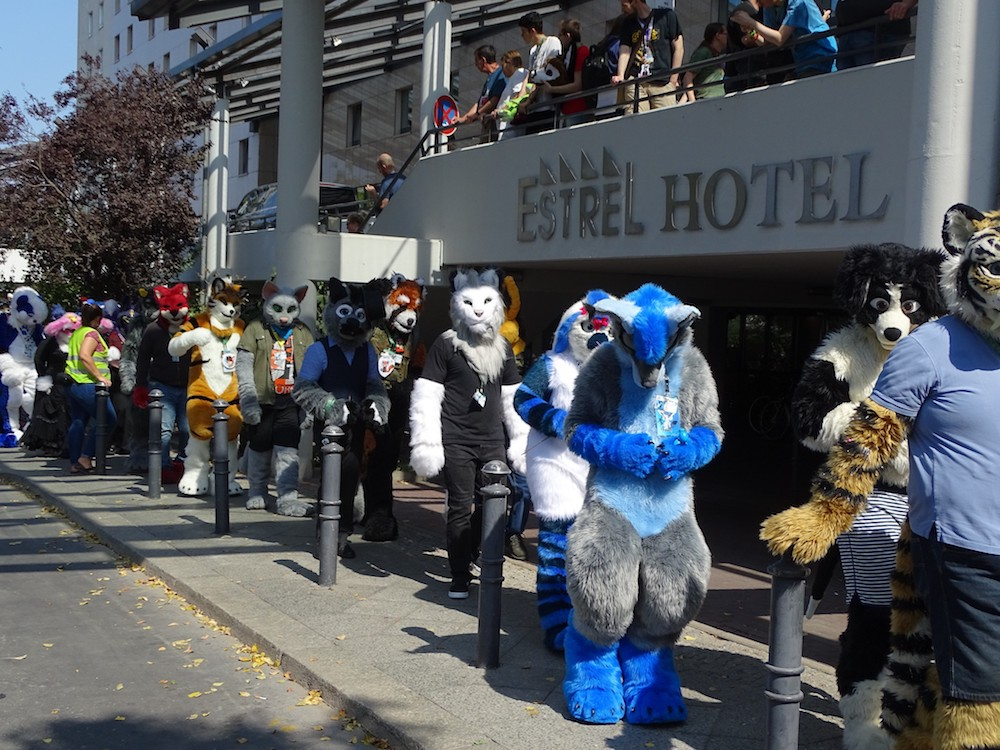
A fursuit parade passes by the Estrel Hotel in Berlin during Eurofurence 24 in 2018

A furry convention is an event where fans get together to buy and sell artwork, participate in workshops or panels, wear costumes, and socialize. Anthrocon, in 2008, was the largest furry convention at the time, with more than 5,861 attendees. It was estimated to have generated approximately $3 million for Pittsburgh's economy that year. Another convention, Further Confusion, held in San Jose each January, closely follows Anthrocon in scale and attendance. As of December 2022, Midwest FurFest was the world's largest furry convention; despite its size, which is attributed to the nearby O'Hare International Airport allowing attendees easy access from around the world, the convention is noted to have little economic impact to the surrounding Rosemont, Illinois area compared to that of Anthrocon in its native Pittsburgh, which reported attendance numbers of 16,800 in 2024 and 18,357 in 2025. By 2026, Anthrocon was being widely reported as the "world's largest furry con" again. Even higher attendance numbers are reported by virtual conventions; Furality, a VRChat-based convention, had 21,000 registrations in 2024.

Conventions are often associated with charities, and "nearly all" chose an animal-themed charity to support. A 2018 study found that more than 85% of furries surveyed had donated to an animal-themed charity. $470,000 was raised by conventions for charity from 2000 to 2009. Besides animal charities, conventions frequently raise money for LGBTQ-oriented causes; for example, Furry Weekend Atlanta raised $150,000 for Lost-n-Found Youth in 2026, and Las Vegas Fur Con raised over $10,000 for the transgender support group Las Vegas TransPride. The smaller Albany, New York-based con Eufuria raised $4,800 for a local LGBTQ advocacy organization the same year.

The first known furry convention, ConFurence, is no longer held; Califur replaced it in 2004, as both conventions were based in Southern California. A 2007 survey suggested that about 40% of furries had attended at least one furry convention; analysis in 2023 by Reysen and Plante concluded that "most furries have attended at least a few [conventions]". While most furry conventions take place in the United States, conventions have started across the world, spanning countries in North and South America, Europe, Asia, and Australia. One of the largest conventions outside the US is Eurofurence, which was started with the intention to change its host country every year. Smaller "furmeets" occur more frequently than conventions, and may only involve a small group of furries who arrange to meet up for a short period of time.

=== IT industry and tech ===
It is often suggested that "furries run the internet", as members of the furry community are overrepresented in the IT industry. One example was David Benaron, a physician and biomedical researcher who participated in the furry community under the alias of a cheetah named Spottacus. Studies in 2014 and 2016 that surveyed convention-going furries found that much of the fandom is made up of college students and recent graduates working skilled or white-collar jobs. Compared to other fandoms, such as those interested in anime and manga or fantasy sports, furries were more likely to describe their work as involving computers. On the whole, however, the average American furry was found to have an annual income comparable to that of most Americans. Several furries note that while their furry friends may know about their occupation, they rarely share information about their interest in the furry fandom with those they work alongside, citing its negative public perception. However, furries in the tech industry also note that connections within the fandom have helped them get jobs within the industry.

== Demographics and sociology ==
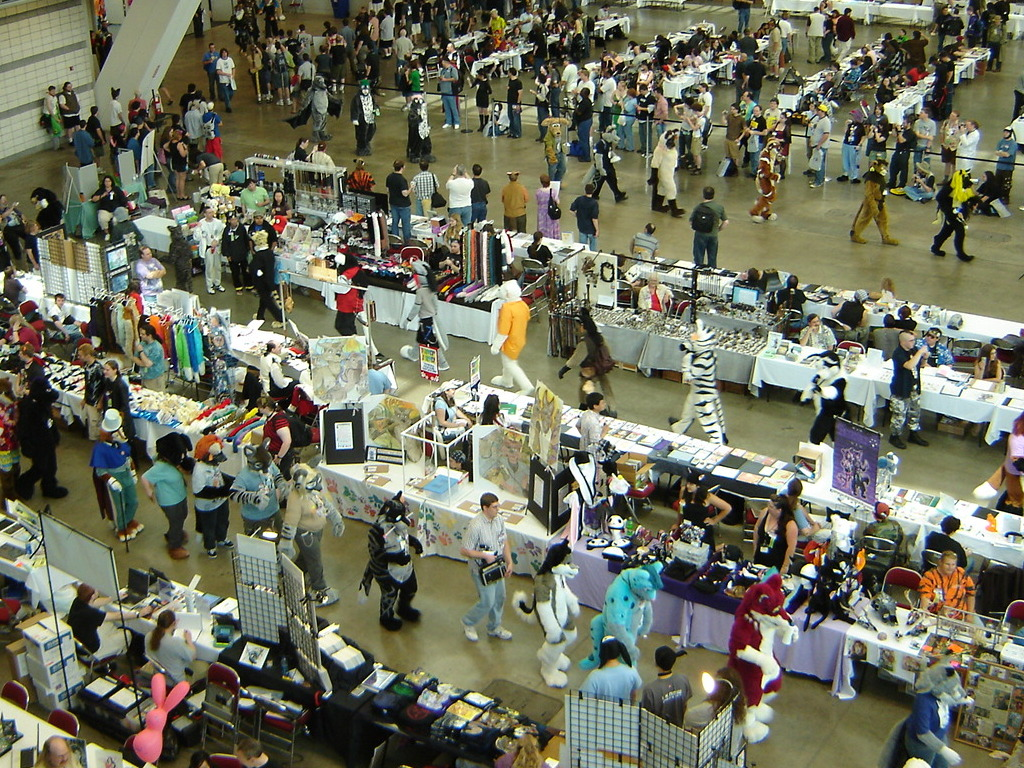
While some furry fans create and wear costumes called "fursuits" depicting their characters, not all of them do. In this photo from Anthrocon 2007, furries in and out of fursuits walk between artists' booths.

The International Anthropomorphic Research Project (IARP), a team of social scientists, has been collecting data on the furry fandom since 2011. Their 2016 publication collects several peer-reviewed and self-published studies into a single volume, titled Furscience. Among their findings were that the average adult furry is between 23 and 27 years of age, with more than 75% of furries being 25 years of age or younger, and 88% of adult furries being under the age of 30. Minors were not included in the study for professional ethics reasons. IARP estimated that 20% were under the age of 18. Over two-thirds (67.1%) of furries identified themselves as male on the surveys, while 23.3% identified as female. 2% of furries identified themselves as transgender, and 10% of furries identified themselves as genderqueer or non-binary. Early surveys found that the furry fandom was male-dominated, with 2007–08 surveys reporting around 80% male respondents, though later studies that allowed for choices broader than a male/female binary found lower percentages of male respondents. More than 25% of respondents to surveys from 2021 to 2022 identified as transgender or did not identify with the labels of male or female. The prevalence of men in the furry fandom has been reported since even before the 2000s.

According to surveys conducted at various furry conventions in North America, between 83% and 90% of furries self-identify as White, with small minorities of furries self-identifying as Asian (2–5%), (Note: Data from Plante et al lists 2% identifying as "Asian", and around 3% identifying as "East Indian" or "Middle Eastern") Black (2–3%), and Hispanic (3%). Over a fifth (21%) of furries identify as members of the brony fandom, 44% identity as anime fans, and 11% identify as sports fans. Furries, as a group, are more politically progressive and less religious than the average American or other comparable fan groups such as anime fans, while still containing groups such as neo-Nazis and alt-right activists. Almost a quarter of furries (23.5%) self-identified as Christian, 16.8% as atheist, 16.8% as agnostic, 11.0% as Pagan/Wiccan, 2.4% as Buddhist, 1.2% as Jewish, 1.1% as Deist, 0.9% as Satanist, and 26.2% as "other" (including "participants who had their own belief systems, were undecided, refused to answer, or had uncommon belief systems"). Groups of furries that practice religion may fear being ostracized both by the largely secular furry fandom and by their professional colleagues.

Approximately 70% of adult furries have either completed or are currently completing post-secondary education. Further results from the IARP were published in a 2023 book, also titled Furscience. Furry demographics are informed by the way they are collected; most surveyed furries are advertised to on English-speaking websites, and those that have been interviewed or surveyed in person were only at conventions in North America and western Europe. Furry communities exist across the globe, as seen in Mexico, Russia, Japan, Philippines, Indonesia, and South Africa. In some regions, like Latin America, the costs of importing materials may be prohibitively high for prospective fursuiters, and conservative government policies may reduce the visibility of furry communities.

A Pittsburgh-based researcher reported that up to 15% of furries may have autism, compared with about 2% of children in the United States population as estimated by the Center for Disease Control. The 15% figure includes people who may be undiagnosed but self-identify as autistic. Studies that asked whether furries had been diagnosed have found responses varying from 3% up to 13.2% of the surveyed sample having been diagnosed. Through surveying a broader range of disorders, including attention deficit hyperactivity disorder and anxiety, furries were not found to be particularly susceptible to diagnosable mental health problems compared to the general population.

One of the most universal behaviors in the furry fandom is the creation of a fursona—an anthropomorphic animal representation or avatar. More than 95% of furries have a fursona. Nearly half of furries report that they have only ever had one fursona to represent themselves; relatively few furries have had more than three or four fursonas. The most popular fursona species include wolves, foxes, dogs, large felines, and dragons. There is generally no association between personality traits and different fursona species. Furries report different degrees of personality traits when thinking of themselves in their everyday identity compared with their fan identity. Some furries identify as partly non-human: 35% say they do not feel 100% human (compared with 7% of non-furries), and 39% say they would be 0% human if they could (compared with 10% of non-furries).

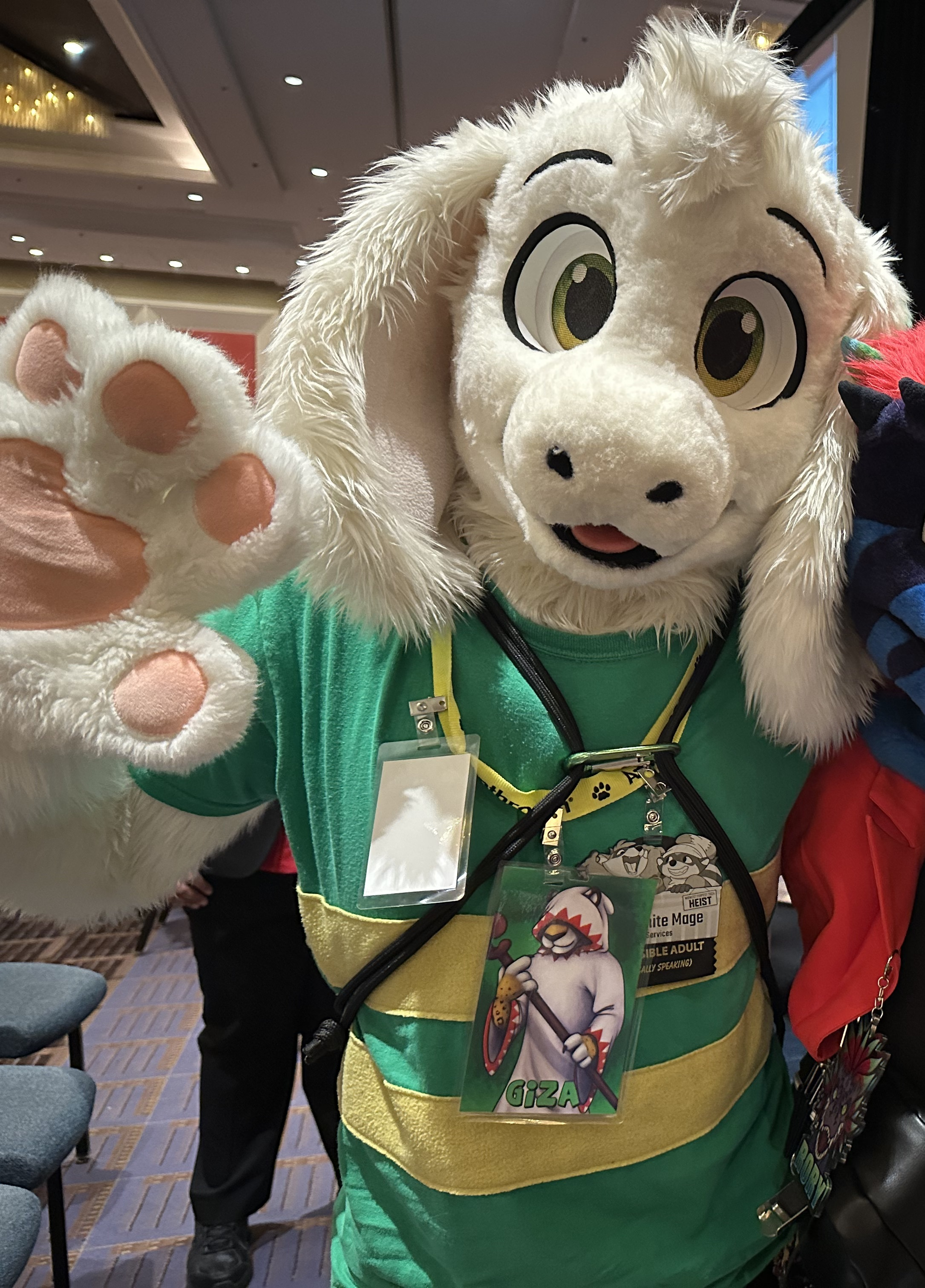
Some furries also identify as gamers and may prefer to play games featuring furry characters. Pictured is a fursuit of the character Asriel Dreemurr from the 2015 video game Undertale.

Inclusion and belonging are central themes in the furry fandom: compared with members of other fandoms such as anime or fantasy sports, furries are significantly more likely to identify with other members of their fan community. On average, half of a furry's friends are also furries themselves. Furries rate themselves higher (compared with a comparison community sample of non-furries) on the degree of global awareness (knowledge of the world and felt connections to others in the world), global citizenship identification (psychological connection with global citizens), and environmental sustainability. Many furries find overlap in their interests with other hobbies, such as anime and manga, video games, and music, though most gravitate towards "furry media" when possible. Furries may turn to external media to distract from their own lives and potentially benefit more from their involvement with the furry fandom through their engagement with art.

=== Furry lifestyle and therianthropy ===
The phrases "furry lifestyle" and "furry lifestyler" first appeared in July 1996 on the newsgroup alt.fan.furry during an ongoing dispute within the online community. The Usenet newsgroup was created to accommodate discussion beyond furry art and literature, and to resolve disputes concerning what should or should not be associated with the fandom; its members quickly adopted the term "furry lifestylers", and considered the fandom and the lifestyle to be separate social entities. They defined and adopted an alternative meaning of the word "furry" specific to this group: "a person with an important emotional/spiritual connection with an animal or animals, real, fictional, or symbolic." The description of a furry lifestyle has since developed and has been contrasted with being furry as a hobby; some furries who treat their interest in the fandom as a hobby use this distinction to denote that they do not take it as seriously as do others (who may wear a tail and collar every day and at work), but hobbyists are not typically seen as "lesser furries" when compared to lifestylers.

In their 2007 survey, Gerbasi and colleagues examined what it meant to be a furry, and proposed a taxonomy in which to categorize different "types" of furries. The largest group—38% of those surveyed—described their interest in furry fandom predominantly as a "route to socializing with others who share common interests such as anthropomorphic art and costumes." They also identified furries who saw themselves as "other than human", or who desired to become more like the furry species which they identified with. They suggested that this identification as "less than human" could be considered parallel to gender identity disorder (reclassified in 2013 as gender dysphoria), and described it using the term "species identity disorder". Several issues with this particular comparison made in the study were raised in 2011, mainly focusing on the controversial nature of gender identity disorder as a diagnosis and the means by which Gerbasi and colleagues drew conclusions about these subjects. The term "species identity disorder" has since been abandoned, and the broader idea of nonhuman identity is now more often discussed in relation to therians and otherkin.

=== Sexuality ===
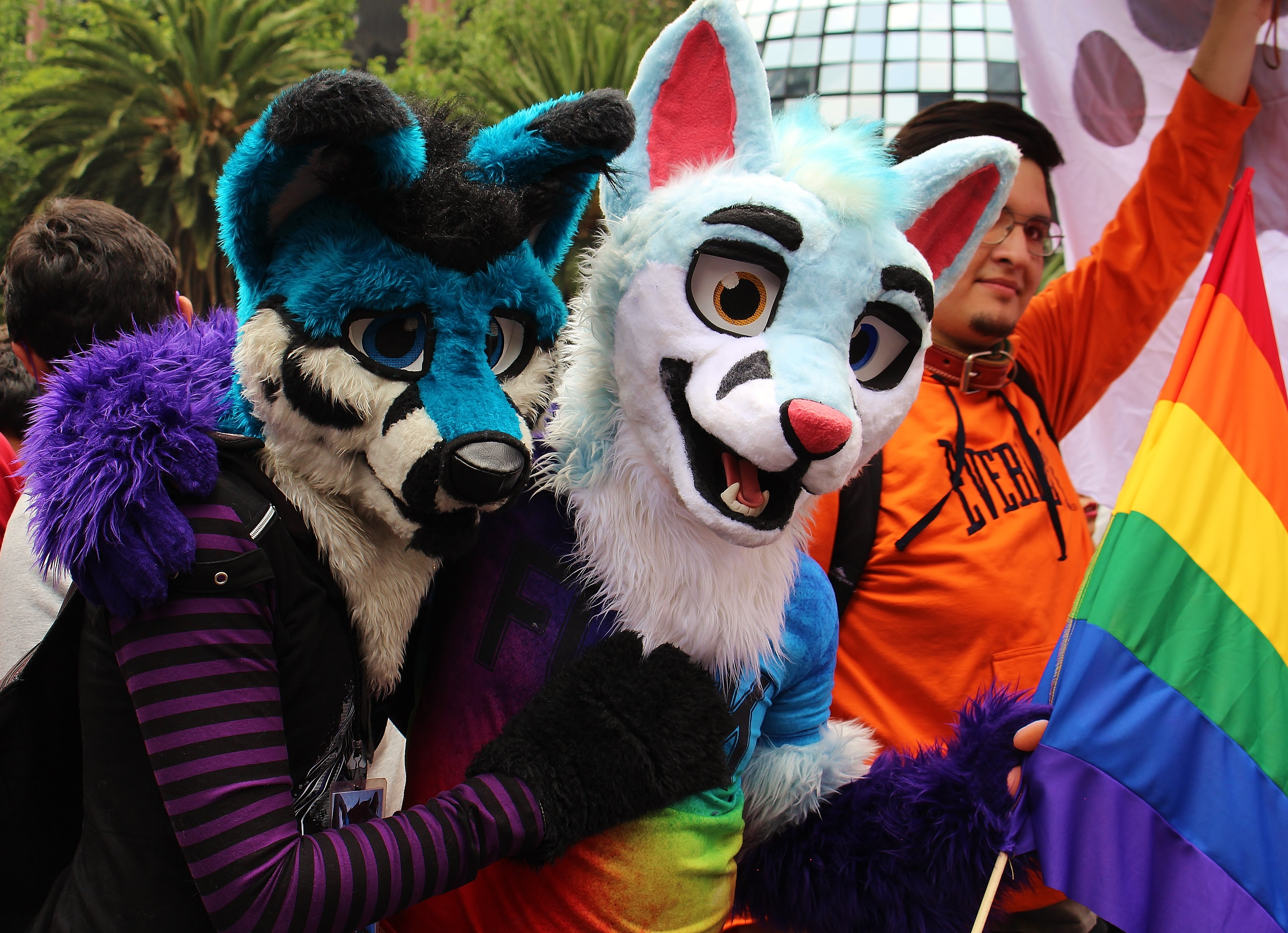
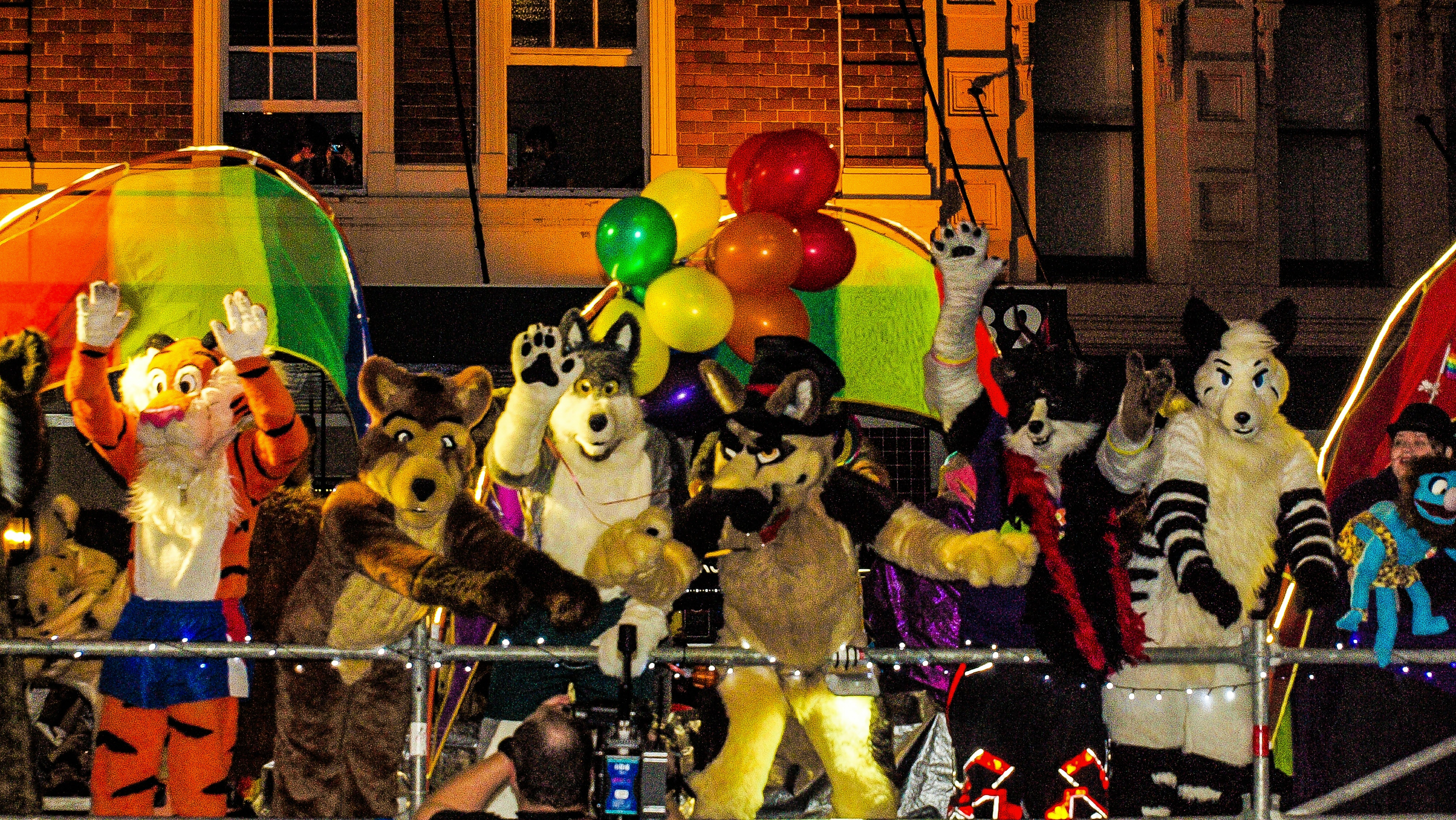
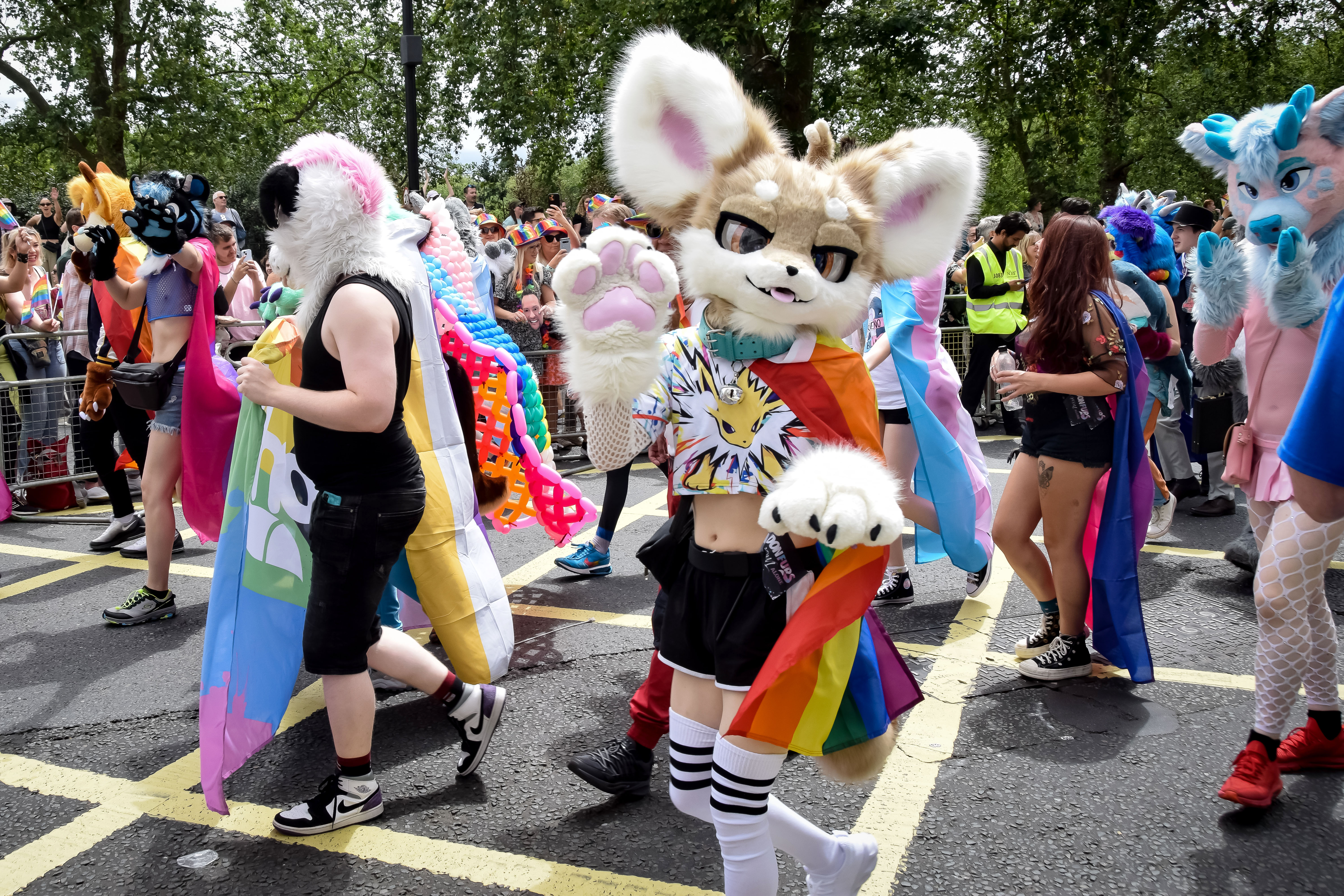
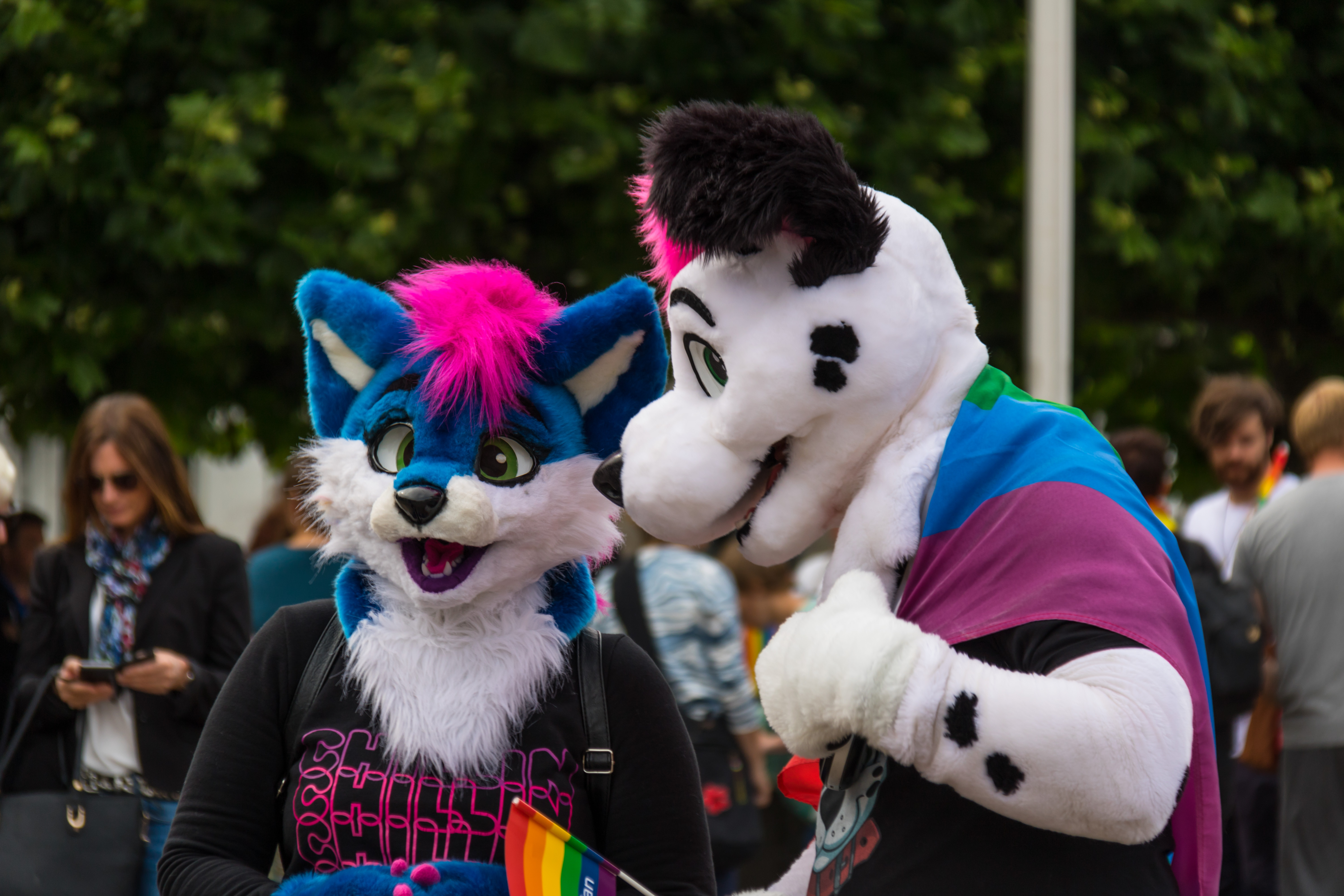
A majority of the furry fandom falls within the group of LGBTQ people. Clockwise from upper left: Furries at Mexico City Pride, on a float at Sydney Gay and Lesbian Mardi Gras, at Pride in London, and in a pride parade in Malmö.

According to four different surveys conducted from 2007 to 2011, 14–25% of the fandom members report homosexuality, 37–52% bisexuality, 28–39% heterosexuality, and 3–8% other forms of alternative sexual relationships. Approximately half of the respondents reported being in a relationship, of which 76% were in a relationship with another member of the furry fandom. The prevalence of queer people within the furry fandom since its inception has been described by American historian Jim Downs as an example of people "[inventing] new families and communities that could offer some haven from oppression", a practice that was developing at a rapid pace following the 1969 Stonewall riots.

==== Furry pornography ====
Examples of sexual aspects within the furry fandom include erotic art and furry-themed cybersex. The majority of furries responding to surveys on non-adult websites find that sexual attraction is not a very important part of their furry activities. A 2013 convention survey found that while a majority of respondents had viewed furry pornography, only a small minority cited it as their primary reason for joining the fandom. Fursuiters in particular are far less likely to be motivated by sex in their consumption of furry art compared to the rest of the fandom. Some furries create and use furry art, both general-audience and explicit, as a means of exploring their own sexuality and gender identity.

A 1997–1998 survey found that about 2% of respondents reported an interest in zoophilia, while an anonymous 2008 survey found that 17% identified as zoophiles. More recent sources state that real-life zoophilia and bestiality are generally regarded as taboo within the furry fandom, with zoophiles often ostracized from in-person events and online communities. Despite this, a connection between the fandom and zoophilia remains, particularly in the perception of those unfamiliar with the fandom.

== Public perception and media coverage ==
Reporters from KDKA-TV interviewing Samuel Conway at Anthrocon 2006

Early portrayals of furries in magazines such as Wired, Loaded, and Vanity Fair focused mainly on the sexual aspect of the furry fandom. Fictional portrayals of the furry fandom have appeared in television shows such as The Simpsons, ER, CSI: Crime Scene Investigation, The Drew Carey Show, Sex2K on MTV, Entourage, 1000 Ways to Die, Tosh.0, Check It Out! with Dr. Steve Brule, and 30 Rock. Furries have claimed that media portrayals from the late 90s and early 2000s are misconceptions. By the later 2000s, coverage had shifted to focus on addressing the myths and stereotypes associated with the furry fandom. A reporter attending Anthrocon 2006 noted that "despite their wild image from Vanity Fair, MTV, and CSI, furry conventions aren't about kinky sex between weirdos gussied up in foxy costumes", that conference attendees were "not having sex more than the rest of us", and that the furry convention was about "people talking and drawing animals and comic-book characters in sketchbooks." In October 2007, a Hartford Advocate reporter attended FurFright 2007 undercover because of media restrictions. She learned that the restrictions were intended to prevent misinformation, and reported that the scandalous behavior she had expected was not present. A 2009 article from the BBC entitled "Who are the furries?" was the first piece of journalism to be nominated for an Ursa Major Award, a major award within the fandom. The article described furry fans' belief that they will be portrayed as "mainly obsessed with sex", which has led to distrust of the media and social researchers.

Milwaukee Brewers broadcaster Jim Powell was sharing a hotel with Anthrocon 2007 attendees a day before the convention and reported a negative opinion of furries. Several downtown Pittsburgh businesses welcomed furries during the event, with local business owners creating special T-shirts and drawing paw prints in chalk outside their shops to attract attendees. Samuel Conway, CEO of Anthrocon, said "For the most part, people give us curious stares, but they're good-natured curious stares. We're here to have fun, people have fun having us here, everybody wins". Positive coverage was generated following a furry convention that was held in a Vancouver hotel where several Syrian refugees were being temporarily housed. Despite some concerns and warnings by staff that there could be a negative culture clash if the two groups interacted, the refugee children were on the whole delighted to meet the convention goers, especially those in fursuits. News coverage of the furry fandom has generally trended to be more positive in English-language media since the late 2010s.

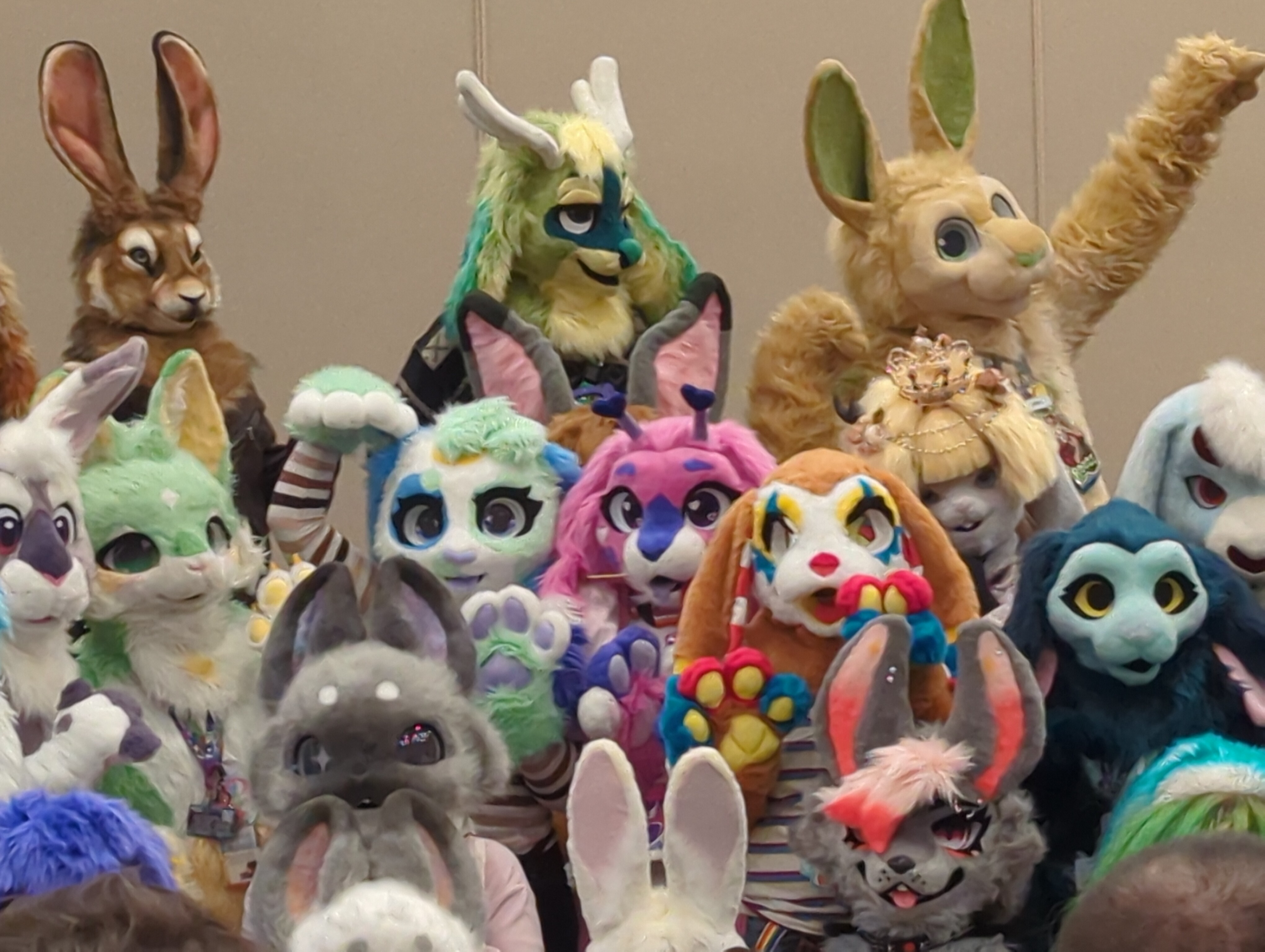
A group of rabbit fursuiters

A 2008 survey found that about half of furries perceived public reaction to the fandom as negative at the time. College students and fantasy sports fans surveyed from 2016 to 2023 corroborate the negative perception of the fandom felt by its members; when asked to rate how they felt towards different fandoms, furries were consistently among the most negatively-judged groups, being placed alongside bronies and juggalos. Many furries have been subject to bullying due to their identity and may be reluctant to disclose their participation in the furry fandom to friends and family due to the stigma it poses. Being furry may contribute to the factors that make an individual more susceptible to bullying, though this is not always the main cause, as evidenced in a 2022 study of South African furries. Furries working in public service may fear reprisal if their colleagues were to discover their identity; in one instance, a councilman in New Milford, Connecticut was forced to resign after being outed as furry. Furries have been targeted with violence even at conventions, as was the case in the 2014 Midwest FurFest gas attack. Bomb threats are reportedly common at Anthrocon, even as of 2024.

In 2021 and 2022, media coverage in Canada and the United States focused on false rumors about litter boxes in schools being provided for furries, which was part of a cultural backlash amplified by conservative and far-right politicians against transgender accommodations in schools. Hoaxes about animal-like behavior in schools, including the use of litter boxes, led to the 2025 proposal of a bill to ban animal-like behavior and accessories that failed to pass committee in Texas. On September 22, 2026, Alabama senator Tommy Tuberville made a speech on the United States Senate floor deriding the furry fandom, calling it a "deranged fetish" and conflating it with "gender confusion" and mental illness. He went on to claim that there were an "alarming" number of aviation personnel, including pilots, flight attendants, and air traffic controllers, who participated in the furry fandom.

== See also ==
- Costumed performer
- Human–animal hybrid
- Kemonomimi
- Quadrobics

=== Documentaries ===
- A Tail of Identity
- Fursonas
- The Fandom

=== Related subcultures ===
- Babyfur
- Brony
- Kemonā
- Sonic the Hedgehog fandom
