= Yerf World =

In on-line computer gaming, the Yerfworld can refer to two ages in the game of Myst.

- For the upper Yerfworld, see FurryMUCK.
- For the lower Yerfworld, see Tapestries MUCK.
