= Fursonas (film) =

2016 documentary film by Dominic Rodriguez

- Directed by: Dominic Rodriguez
- Produced by: Olivia Vaughn
- Cinematography: Jordan Serra
- Edited by: Christine Meyer
- Production company: Animal Media Group
- Distributed by: Gravitas Ventures
- Release date: January 25, 2016
- Country: United States
- Language: English

Fursonas is a documentary film regarding the furry fandom. Directed by Dominic Rodriguez, it was released in January 2016. It was produced by Olivia Vaughn and edited by Christine Meyer, among others. Fursonas follows multiple individual furries being interviewed to provide social commentary of the fandom, its common stigmas, and how it is perceived through sensational media coverage.

== Production ==
Production of Fursonas began as a senior thesis project, started by Rodriguez while a filmmaking major at Point Park University with Olivia Vaughn and Christine Meyer. Originally a 12-minute short film, the film was expanded into a feature length documentary when the crew was awarded a 10,000 dollar grant from The Sprout Fund in 2013. In 2014, Meyer and Vaughn became interns at the Animal Media Group, a production and visual effects studio. Animal allowed the crew to use their facilities to edit the footage of the documentary and later offered to be the official production company for the documentary.

== Premiere ==
The documentary premiered at the 2016 Slamdance Film Festival, and is distributed via Video on demand by Gravitas Ventures.

== Reception ==
Fursonas was well-received, winning the "Spirit of Slamdance" award at its debut film festival and receiving positive reviews from magazines Variety and Deadline Hollywood.

Despite a positive reception, the film resulted in its director receiving a lifetime ban from Anthrocon, the biggest furry convention in the world as of 2024. Though accused of filming at the con without consent, the ban has been seen largely as Samuel Conway's retribution for his negative portrayal in the film.

== Cast ==
(The list consists of the interviewees' fursona names, rather than their real names)

- Boomer The Dog
- Freya Fox
- IllKato
- Grix Fox
- Diezel Raccoon
- Quad Shadow Bandit
- Imaginary Skye La Lux
- Chew Fox
- Tom Cat
- Uncle Kage
- Varka
