= Archipelagos (video game) =

1989 video game

- European Atari ST cover art
- Developer: Astral Software
- Publisher: Logotron
- Platforms: Amiga, Atari ST, MS-DOS
- Release: 1989
- Genres: Action, strategy
- Mode: Single player

Archipelagos is a first person action and strategy video game developed by Astral Software for Amiga, Atari ST, and MS-DOS. It was published in 1989 by Logotron.

== Plot ==
The game takes place on a series of islands (the titular archipelagos). These islands were created by a mysterious race known only as the Ancients. The Ancients also created another race, the Visitors, who ended up being their downfall, as the Visitors rebelled against their creators, ultimately killing them. As the blood of the slaughtered Ancients soaked into the land, the worlds they had created became twisted and poisoned. This is the world the player now finds themselves in, with the task of restoring the islands to their former, uncorrupted glory.

== Gameplay ==
The first level (Atari ST)

The game is played from a first person 3D view. The player is not a specific character, but a kind of disembodied consciousness. Each level consists of a landscape made up of one or more lost islands. The player can manipulate the landscape, creating land and disinfecting it. Each level has a stone obelisk, a number of egg shaped boulders, and various hazards, such as animated trees, souls, or other enemies. The aim of each level is to destroy all of the boulders. Boulders can only be destroyed if joined by at least one continuous land bridge to the obelisk. Once the boulders are destroyed, a timer starts. The player then has 90 seconds to reach the obelisk and destroy it.

Various obstacles stand in the player's way. There are animated trees which spread the blood of the ancients from their roots as they move around. Moving into an area contaminated by the blood damages the player. Also, once the timer has been started by destroying all of the boulders, the trees become enraged, and swarm towards the player. Later levels introduce other creatures and hazards, but the core gameplay remains the same throughout the game. As the levels are procedurally generated from seed numbers, there are 9999 levels in total.

== Reception ==
Archipelagos received largely positive reviews upon release. The Atari ST version received review scores of 92%, 84% and 9/10 respectively from The One magazine (issue 7, Apr 89), ST/Amiga Format magazine (issue 11, May 89), and Atari ST User (unknown issue, Jun 89). The Amiga version scored 79% from CU Amiga (Jun 89) and 90% in Zzap (Issue 51, Jul 89). Elements of the game highlighted in reviews included the 3D graphics, which were seen as very advanced for the time, the atmospheric nature of the game, and its originality.

Computer Gaming World stated "graphically, this game is stunning, perhaps even shocking ... the game concept is innovative and the play becomes increasingly engrossing". It concluded: "Archipelagos is a distinctive product that well deserves to be imported". Compute! described it as "unusual and addictive", recommending the game to those seeking "challenging logic puzzles with first-rate graphics animation". STart described Archipelagos as "one of the most original games I've seen, both in gameplay and in original concept", with an "odd and eerie setting that works despite an eminently forgettable scenario". The magazine recommended it to those who enjoyed puzzles or "truly weird challenges". The game was reviewed in 1991 in Dragon #169 by Hartley, Patricia, and Kirk Lesser in "The Role of Computers" column. The reviewers gave the game 4 out of 5 stars.

== Legacy ==
A remake of Archipelagos, called Archipelagos 2000 and developed by Anthill Studios was released for Windows in 1999.
