= Furry Weekend Atlanta =

Furry convention held in Atlanta, Georgia, U.S.

- Status: Active
- Genre: Furry
- Venue: Atlanta Marriott Marquis, Hyatt Regency Atlanta, Hilton Atlanta
- Locations: Atlanta, Georgia
- Country: United States
- Inaugurated: 2004
- Most recent: 2026
- Attendance: ▼17,301 in 2026
- Organizer: Furry Weekend Atlanta, Inc.
- Website: www.furryweekend.com

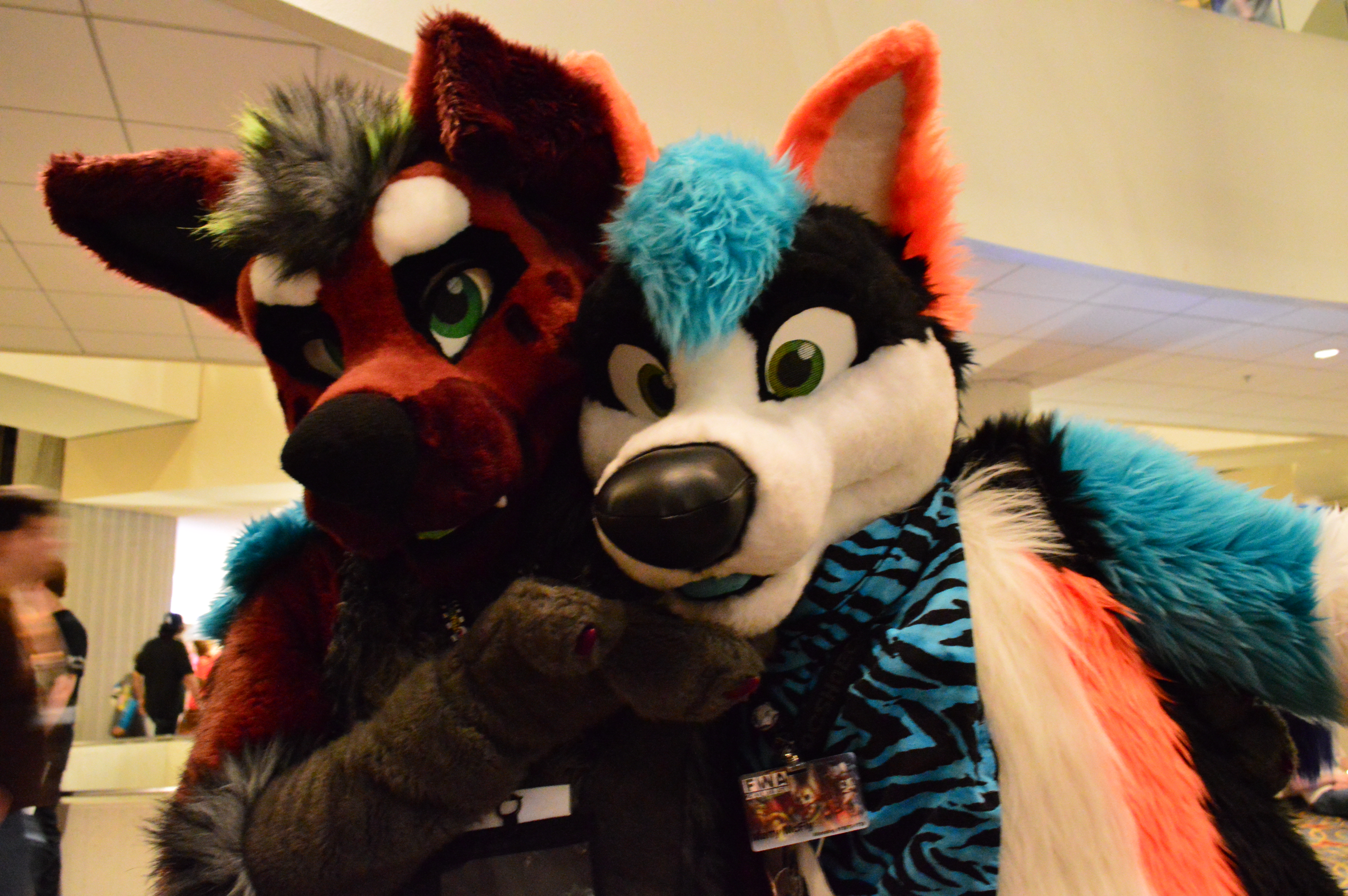
Fursuiters at Furry Weekend Atlanta 2015

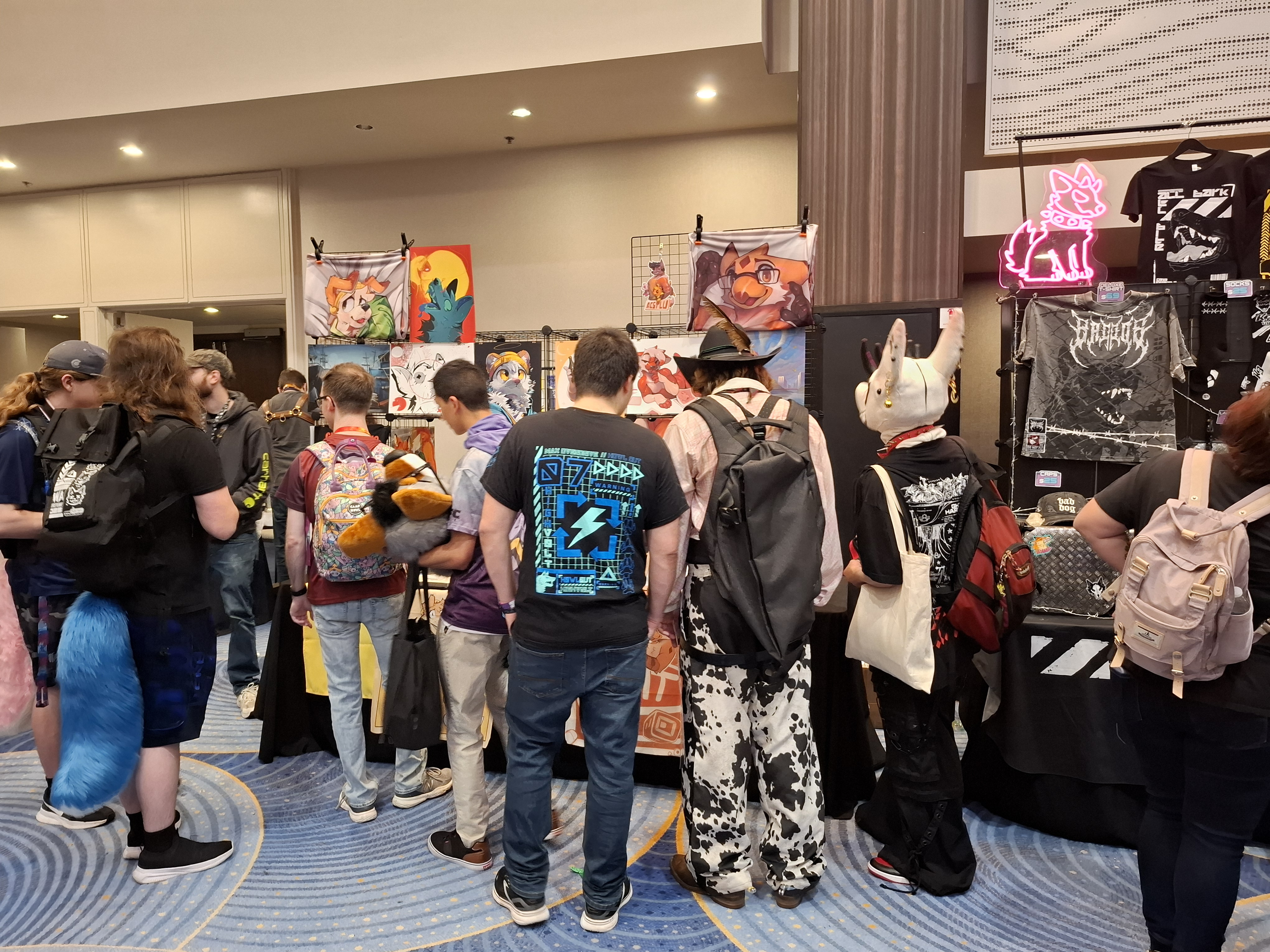
Convention goers at a dealer's stall in 2025

Furry Weekend Atlanta (FWA) is a furry convention held annually in Atlanta, Georgia, United States. Started in 2004, the convention caters to members of the furry fandom, a subculture focused around fictional anthropomorphic animal characters. Attendance has steadily risen throughout its history, peaking at 17,736 attendees in 2025, (Note: https://bsky.app/profile/furryweekend.com/post/3lozhw55m322w) making it one of the most attended furry conventions in the world.

== History ==
Furry Weekend Atlanta started as an outgrowth of a local furry meetups often held in Atlanta at the homes of various members of the furry fandom. As the gatherings became larger, the idea of formally holding a convention was raised. After several unsuccessful attempts, a plan was made to hold a convention in February 2004. The name Furry Weekend Atlanta was chosen to echo the name of the anime convention held in the city, Anime Weekend Atlanta. The name became a federally registered trademark on December 2, 2008. Originally held around Valentine's Day, the convention was rescheduled to be held mid-March in 2009, and since 2019 has been held on the first or second weekend of May.

== Organization ==
Furry Weekend Atlanta, Inc. is the 501(c)(3) nonprofit corporation which organizes the Furry Weekend Atlanta convention. Furry Weekend Atlanta, Inc. is headed by an executive committee which, in addition to operating the annual convention, promotes the acceptance of the furry fandom in the southeastern United States. Furry Weekend Atlanta, Inc. retains only the funds necessary for the organization of the Furry Weekend Atlanta convention, and donates the rest to charities.

== Charity ==
In 2005 and 2006, Furry Weekend Atlanta supported the Ellijay Wildlife Rehabilitation Sanctuary, a state and federally licensed wildlife rehabilitation center located in Ellijay, Georgia. Furry Weekend Atlanta attendees donated almost $4,000 to the Sanctuary in 2006, and almost $3,000 in 2005. From 2007 to 2023, Furry Weekend Atlanta supported the Conservator's Center, a nonprofit organization working to preserve threatened species. As of 2024, FWA supports Lost-n-Found Youth.

== FWA by year ==
Furry Weekend Atlanta attendance by year

Year	Dates	Location	Attendance	Charity Donation	Charity	Theme	Guests of Honor
2004	February 13–15	Holiday Inn Atlanta	270	—N/a	Ellijay Wildlife Rehabilitation Sanctuary	—N/a	Fursuit maker and graphic artist Valentina Caicedo
2005	February 11–13	Holiday Inn Atlanta	500	$3,000	Ellijay Wildlife Rehabilitation Sanctuary	—N/a	Artist Jessica Maia Albee, aka "Jessie T. Wolf"; Artist "Fel"
2006	February 17–19	Holiday Inn Atlanta	563	$4,000	Ellijay Wildlife Rehabilitation Sanctuary	—N/a	Cartoonist Bill Holbrook; Matt Burt
2007	February 16–18	Sheraton Gateway Hotel	762	—N/a	Conservator's Center	—N/a	Artist "Strider Orion"; Artist Daria McGrain
2008	February 15–17	Sheraton Gateway Hotel	1,046	$5,001	Conservator's Center	—N/a	Artist "Bonk"; Fursuiter "TILT Longtail"
2009	March 19–22	Hilton Atlanta	1,371	$5,054	Conservator's Center	On Safari	Musician Matthew Ebel; Artist "Lizardbeth"
2010	March 25–28	Hilton Atlanta	1,564	$4,600	Conservator's Center	Carnaval!	"Kami Cheetah"
2011	March 17–21	Sheraton Atlanta Hotel	1,621	$8,000	Conservator's Center	Furries in Wonderland	Fursuit makers and fursuiters Lacy and Nick; Artist Zhivago Daemon
2012	March 15–19	Sheraton Atlanta Hotel	1,902	$18,000	Conservator's Center	Furries at the Moulin Rouge	Author Kyell Gold; Artist and writer Rukis Croax
2013	March 14–17	Westin Peachtree Plaza Hotel	2,396	$18,400	Conservator's Center	Still in Love	Artist and fursuiter Jimmy Chin; Artist Hibbary
2014	March 20–23	Westin Peachtree Plaza Hotel	2,488	$20,000	Conservator's Center	Furry University	Artist and fursuiter "Louvelex"
2015	April 9–12	Atlanta Marriott Marquis	3,252	$28,000	Conservator's Center	Shangri La: Furgotten Orient	Artist Reimina Clover Keishana; Artist "Silverfox5213"
2016	March 31 – April 3	Atlanta Marriott Marquis	3,431	$28,922	Conservator's Center	Camp Furry Weekend	Artist "Demicoeur"
2017	April 6–9	Atlanta Marriott Marquis	4,274	$35,000	Conservator's Center	Game On!	Artist "Chibi-Marrow"; Syber
2018	April 4–8	Atlanta Marriott Marquis	5,193	$50,000	Conservator's Center	Galactic Gunslingers	Strype; Kazul
2019	May 9–13	Atlanta Marriott Marquis	5,645	$50,000	Conservator's Center	Pirates	Caraid; Sean Chiplock; Luis Dubuc
2020	Cancelled; originally scheduled for May 7–11	Atlanta Marriott Marquis	—N/a	—N/a	Conservator's Center	The Enchanted Forest	Marc Knelsen / El Ranno
2021	Convention moved online May 7–8	At Home	—N/a	—N/a	Conservator's Center	The Enchanted Forest	—N/a
2022	May 5–9	Atlanta Marriott Marquis	7,212	$50,000	Conservator's Center	The Enchanted Forest	Marc Knelsen / El Ranno
2023	May 11–14	Atlanta Marriott Marquis, Hyatt Regency Atlanta	10,328	Unreleased	Conservators Center	The Lost City	Artist "Jacato"
2024	May 9–12	Atlanta Marriott Marquis, Hilton Atlanta	15,021	$100,000	Lost N Found Youth	Furry University: Homecoming	Logan Preshaw (Wickedinsignia)
2025	May 8–11	Atlanta Marriott Marquis, Hilton Atlanta, Hyatt Regency Atlanta	17,736	$150,000	Lost N Found Youth	FuturePunk	Jonathan Vair Duncan; Sasha R. Jones; Red Means Recording
2026	May 7–10	Atlanta Marriott Marquis	17,301	—N/a	—N/a	Nowhere Inn Between	—N/a
