= Vaxine =

1990 video game

- Developer: U.S. Gold
- Publisher: The Assembly Line
- Platforms: Amiga, Atari ST, MS-DOS
- Release: 1990: Amiga, ST; 1991: MS-DOS
- Genre: First-person shooter

Vaxine is a first person shooter published for the Amiga and Atari ST by The Assembly Line in 1990. An MS-DOS version was released in 1991.

== Gameplay ==
Vaxine is a game in which the miniaturized player character fights a deadly virus from within the body of the president of the United States.

== Reception ==
Allen L. Greenberg reviewed the game for Computer Gaming World, and stated that "Vaxine is clearly a product for hard-core arcade fanatics who enjoy wonderfully abstract graphics."

Tom Malcom for Info gave the game 5 stars and said "If you like abstract concept games, this is one of the very best. Vaxine's infinite levels will keep you infinitely entertained."

Amiga Format rated the game 85% and said "Conditions are terrible, it is five to a cell! That cry will be herd the length and breadth of the country any day now. Thing is, it won’t be prisoners complaining about conditions, but your very own body. Unknown, unseen and unexpected a virus is attacking mankind, but luckily the Assembly Line has come up with the Vaxine."

Raze rated the game 84% and said "The basic EGA version is a great little game, but where the PC game really shines is on an enhanced machine. Get hold of a VGA machine with an AdLib or Roland soundcard and you'll have a game that probably improves on even the Amiga version. There's full use of the 256-colour display and some really atmospheric sound effects pumped out of the speakers."
