= David Benaron =

American physician and biomedical researcher (1958–2025)

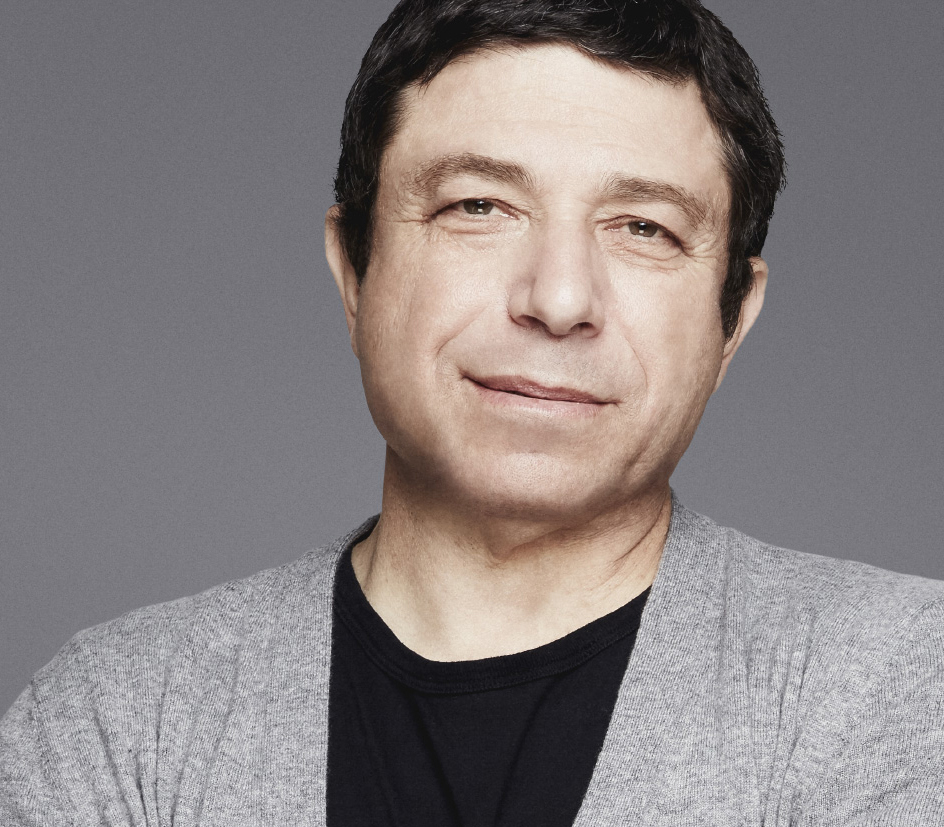
- Benaron, c. 2016
- Born: November 21, 1958; Los Angeles, California, U.S.
- Died: July 19, 2025 (aged 66); Belmont, California, U.S.
- Occupations: Physician, biomedical researcher, technology entrepreneur

David A. Benaron (November 21, 1958 – July 19, 2025) was an American physician, biomedical researcher, and technology entrepreneur. He served as a professor of pediatrics at the Stanford University School of Medicine and was known for contributions to medical optical imaging, wearable health technology, and related biomedical innovations.

== Education ==
Benaron studied biochemistry at the University of California, Davis. He attended the Harvard–MIT Health Sciences and Technology program, earning his medical degree from Harvard Medical School. He completed his Pediatric Residency at the University of Pennsylvania, Children's Hospital of Philadelphia and Fellowship in neonatal intensive care at Stanford Medical School.

== Academic career ==
Benaron joined the faculty of Stanford’s Division of Neonatal and Developmental Medicine in 1989. He worked on optical imaging methods, including early in vivo imaging of infection in collaboration with colleagues at Stanford. He remained at Stanford until 2002 and continued as a consulting professor until 2016.

== Business and technology ==
While at Stanford, Benaron developed biomedical imaging technologies that led to the founding of several biotechnology companies. His work contributed to the development of the green‑light heart‑rate sensor found in many consumer wearables, luciferase‑based bioluminescent imaging, and applications of white‑light spectroscopy for tissue oxygen measurement.

In 2002, he received the Tibbetts Award from the United States Congress for innovation commercialization, and in 2012 he was inducted into the Stanford Inventors Hall of Fame.

Benaron joined technology company Jawbone in 2015 following its acquisition of his company Spectros and later became Chief Medical Officer of Jawbone Health. He worked on wearable systems intended for continuous health monitoring and early detection of chronic conditions.

== Personal life and death ==
Benaron was active in the furry fandom, with his main fursona being a cheetah named Spottacus. He had two children. Benaron died on July 19, 2025, at the age of 66.
