= Sabrina Online =

Furry comedy webcomic strip

- 1997 cover
- Author: Eric W. Schwartz
- Website: www.sabrina-online.com
- Current status/schedule: 1996–2016 (Original black-and-white run); 2017-present (Revived color run)
- Launch date: September 15, 1996
- Publisher(s): E.S. Productions (self-published); Amiga Format; United Publications
- Genre: Furry/Comedy
- Preceded by: Sabrina at See-CAD

Sabrina Online is a furry-themed comedy webcomic strip by cartoonist and animator Eric W. Schwartz. Making its debut online in 1996 during the second decade of webcomics, Sabrina Online stars a young anthropomorphic skunk woman named Sabrina, a shy but witty computer enthusiast and hobbyist as she navigates through an independent life both online and in real life. The webcomic also features several other major characters like Amy, an anthropomorphic squirrel who resides in an apartment as Sabrina's roommate and was conceived by Schwartz as early as 1989. Because of Amy's similar appearance to other female characters in old cartoons, Schwartz created Sabrina as a character whose appearance and personality were very distinct from Amy.

As a college student who attended Columbus College of Art and Design, Schwartz created the comic strip series Sabrina at See-CAD, which appeared in the now-defunct student newsletter Above Ground from 1993 to 1994 and starred Sabrina as the titular main character and a college student. A few years after, he rebooted the series into a different continuity, the Sabrina Online webcomic that also starred both Sabrina and Amy; Sabrina received a visual overhaul for this new comic, with a smaller tail and other minor changes. Since, the webcomic remains regularly updated on its own website, although it also had its strips published in Amiga Format and was published under collection books for Sabrina Online, themselves published by United Publications. The original run's comic strips were black and white and were posted on a monthly schedule from 1996 to 2016. The newer run, which consisted of colored comic strips, began in 2017 with no monthly schedule.

As among the earliest "furry" webcomics, Sabrina Online has been argued by authors to be an iconic entry and early instance of the furry fandom's engagement with online content. It was praised for its writing and story directions in humor and romance and was translated into multiple other languages. It won the "Best Romantic Comic" award in 2001 and was nominated in multiple other categories from 2002 to 2004 under the Web Cartoonists' Choice Awards.

== Premise ==
2026 art of Sabrina Online characters, with Sabrina's family and friends surrounding her.

Sabrina Online is a comedy slice of life webcomic starring a young anthropomorphic skunk woman with glasses named Sabrina. Sabrina is depicted as shy, full of low self-esteem, and not easily willing to make friends but is also noted as smart and witty, having a preference for "clever" humor. She has geeky passions for technology, especially computers like the Amiga 1200 that she owns and likes because of its potential for graphics, and collecting Transformers toys, a trait stemming from not having such toys as a child. Sabrina is a graduate of the Columbus College of Art and Design who works at an adult film studio as a graphics and web designer. Sabrina Online was produced on a monthly schedule for much of its original run and focuses on Sabrina's life in both the real and online worlds, including her social life and romantic developments. The series relies on "nerd humor" with references to internet culture, computers, and other niche references along with sitcom-type scenarios that Sabrina has to face. Other characters of the series include Amy, an anthropomorphic squirrel who is an apartment roommate and friend of Sabrina; Thomas Woolfe, a wolf-fox hybrid who is Amy's boyfriend and later husband; Tabitha, Sabrina's much younger skunk sister; Carli, a chinchilla and online friend of Sabrina; Zig Zag, a ¾ skunk/¼ white tiger hybrid who is the boss of the film studio that Sabrina works for; and Richard (or RC), a raccoon who was an online friend turned love interest of Sabrina.

== Production ==
=== Background and artist biography ===
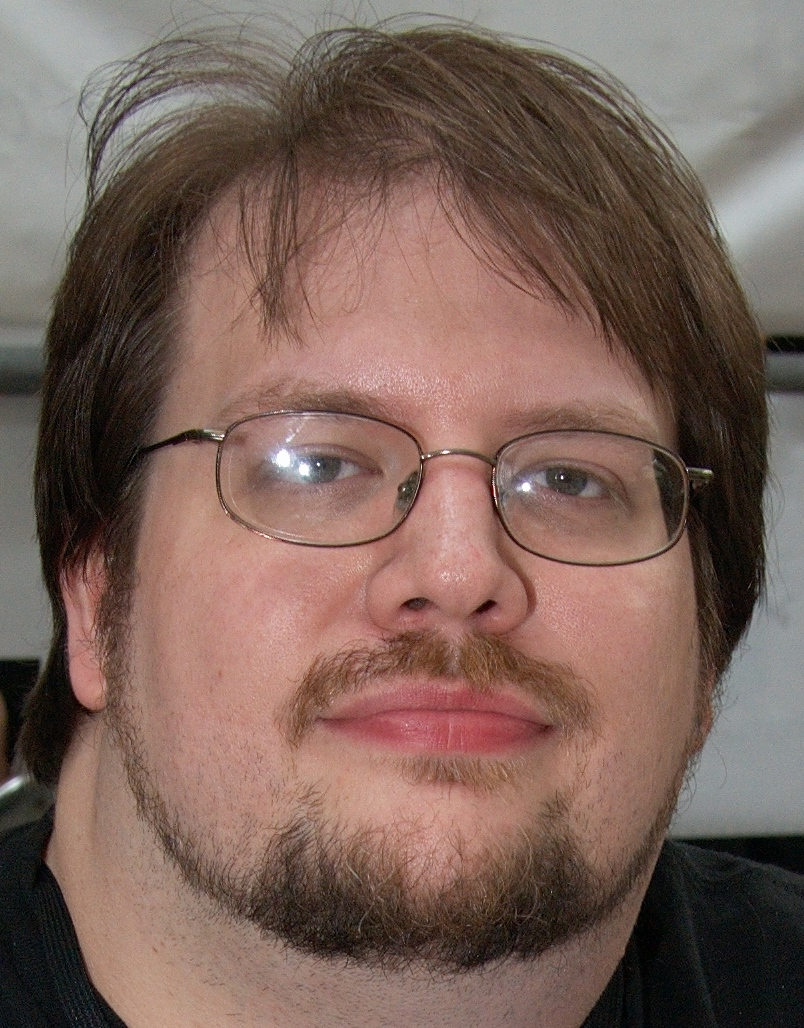
Eric W. Schwartz in 2009

The American cartoonist and animator Eric W. Schwartz was born on November 27, 1971, in Kettering, a suburb of the city of Dayton, Ohio. In high school, he had a high passion for drawing and later found instructors who encouraged his interests, then also beginning to create short animations using Amiga, a type of personal computer produced in the late 20th century by the now-defunct Commodore International. Schwartz attended the Columbus College of Art and Design, where he majored in illustration. His first drawing attempts were based on copying drawn characters like the cat character Garfield from his namesake comic strip series and animated characters from The Walt Disney Company and Warner Bros. Because of the common presence of animals as cartoon characters, he eventually decided to create his own animal characters, although it was not until later that he learned from a few of his fans about furry fandoms. Schwartz said that he became interested in Amiga computers upon their release because they were powerful devices in the 1980s. In 1988, he purchased the Amiga 500, having used it for the creation of short animations. He also mentioned that he did freelance work in illustrations and animations, having done such works in comic books, websites, video game graphics and animations, local television commercials, and his own artworks for sale.

=== Development ===
In 1989, Schwartz created Amy the Squirrel, who he considered to be both one of his first attempts at creating a character inspired by classic cartoon designs and his first popular character among fans. He said that her name was derived from the Amiga and that her personality and design had evolved somewhat. Because reviewers in Amiga magazines commonly mistook other female characters in many old animations for Amy, Schwartz sought to create more characters that were distinct from each other in design. In deliberate contrast to Amy, an "unofficial mascot" of Amiga computers who had a supermodel-style appearance and sported a more confident look, the artist ensured that Sabrina was not as thin and was more insecure of herself. While deciding on creating comic strips for the Columbus College of Art and Design during his senior year, he chose Sabrina as the main character because he felt that she would be more relatable to students than Amy. Thus, he created for the now-defunct student newspaper Above Ground the 1993 to 1994 comic series Sabrina at See-CAD, which featured events inspired by his college experiences. Sabrina at See-CAD differed from its successor comic by Sabrina having a romantic interest named Michael Fox and a larger tail.

In addition to the student newsletter, a few of the comic strips were featured in The American Journal of Anthropomorphics (published by Med Systems) and in Schwartz's own zine. He envisioned a second series after Sabrina at See-CAD called The Life and Birth of Amy the Squirrel, which was planned to focus on Amy's pregnancy and her raising a child but was then scrapped. However, he borrowed concepts of it including stories and jokes for usage in his next comic series Sabrina Online, which he described as "a continuity 'reboot' of sorts". While Schwartz originally thought to publish his successor comic series as a comic book entry, he later received internet connection in the mid-1990s and then wanted to allow users to check his website regularly for updates on the comics from him.

Eric Schwartz published Sabrina Online as a webcomic in September 1996. From 1996 to 2016 during the webcomic's original run, new comics were posted every month. Unlike with his previous comic strip series, its storylines were far less often inspired by real-life events, but the personalities and interests of Sabrina and other characters were drawn from himself and other people he knew. More specifically, Schwartz mentioned that he was probably most like Sabrina since both shared personalities and interests with each other. In an interview dating to 2008, the Sabrina Online author said that for each strip, he first planned out ideas and sketches. Schwartz revealed that he had mainly hand-drawn the comic strips using a pencil, ink, and lettering. He then scanned the final draft of the line-art into his Amiga and used the Personal Paint program by Cloanto for finishing touches.

In addition to Schwartz, many other artists are credited by him for contributions to his webcomic, namely drawings, stories, and characters. The series is posted in its own website by Schwartz, but its strips were also published in the British computer magazine Amiga Format up until the end of its circulation in 2000. He also published collections of Sabrina Online (Sabrina Online: Year 1 followed by its sequels) under British publishing company United Publications and a homemade collection of Sabrina at See-CAD. Schwartz additionally created a short cartoon animation of Sabrina for the CD-ROM called "Plight of the Artist", emphasizing that he had a soft spot for it because of the short having taken the most amount of time for him to create of all his animations as of 1997. For much of the comic series, the strips were colored in black and white. Since the end of the original run in 2016, however, Schwartz used full color for subsequent comic strips which were uploaded to the series' website and through his Patreon channel since 2017. Unlike with the original run, the newer one does not follow a monthly publication schedule; the comics during it are posted on an infrequent basis.

== Reception and legacy ==
Since the creation of early webcomics in 1985, Sabrina Online has been noted by authors as an early example of a comic that uses traditional panel layouts but is published in online formats, with The Comics Journal recording it as an early instance in which furry fandom artists "formed their own massive, insular community with its own stars". T. Campbell, in his history book A History of Webcomics, observed that Sabrina Online offered "risqué" content that was not overly inappropriate but also portrayed virginity and the loss of it in a "heartwarming rather than titillating" manner. He also recorded that the adult video producer in the series was a rare example of a kind and understanding individual within her field. Sabrina Online and several other early webcomics like Kevin and Kell by Bill Holbrook and Suburban Jungle by John Robey were examples of "furry comics" that received high attention from audiences despite potentially slower publishing schedules because of their positive reception and themes of tolerance from the furry fandom.

In her book about skunks, Alyce Miller argued that Sabrina was "one of the most famous furry comics stars" and "a favourite with many in the furry fandom". She continued that Sabrina Online attracted online acclaim globally and had been translated into eight languages including "Polish, Spanish, Russian, German, and Danish". Comix Talk reviewer Matt Trepal considered Sabrina Online to be "one of the most well-known and oldest anthropomorphic animal (or 'furry') comics on the Internet" as well as among the oldest webcomics ever, going further in suggesting that many online artists cited it as an inspiration. He praised the relationship between Sabrina and RC evolving from an online friendship to an in-person romantic relationship and called the writing from Schwartz "funny and crisp". The writer also acknowledged the "risqué" dialogue from Zig Zag and that without the furry aspect of the webcomic and the adult film plotline, the fictional work would have been more typical of an American newspaper's comic. Trepal added that the webcomic balances well between the "incredibly detailed strips" and "spare environments", referring to Sabrina Online as a "cleverly-written, well-drawn example of cartooning".

The series was also the subject of multiple awards. In 2001, it was the winner of the "Best Romantic Comic" award for the Web Cartoonists' Choice Awards. In subsequent years for the same annual awards, it was also a nominee for "Best Anthropomorphic Comic" in 2002, "Outstanding Anthropomorphic Comic" and "Outstanding Romantic Comic" in 2003, and "Outstanding Anthropomorphic Comic" in 2004. The comic collection Sabrina Online 'A Trio of Tales' (published the same year) won the 2025 "General Literary Award" from the Ursa Major Awards.
