= Lost-n-Found Youth =

Atlanta organization for homeless youth

Lost-n-Found Youth, Inc.
- Founded: 2011; 15 years ago
- Founders: Rick Westbrook; Art Izzard; Paul Swicord
- Type: Nonprofit
- Tax ID no.: 45-4153322 (EIN)
- Location: Atlanta, Georgia
- Executive director: Melanea Alvarez
- Website: lostnfoundyouth.org

Lost-n-Found Youth is an Atlanta, Georgia-based organization that assists homeless LGBTQ youth. The organization, at the time of its 2011 founding, was the "only organization actively taking Atlanta's LGBT homeless youth directly off the streets". They work with young adults ages 18 to 25, helping them find housing, employment, and other things that are needed to maintain independence.

== Operations ==
As of June 2026, the chief executive director is Melanea Alvarez.

== History ==
Lost-n-Found Youth started in 2011 as a project organized by the Sisters of Perpetual Indulgence to address the need for a homeless shelter to specifically meet the needs of LGBTQ youth in the Atlanta area. The organization, originally known as the Saint Lost and Found project, was founded by Rick Westbrook, Art Izzard, and Paul Swicord. Since its inception, the organization has helped more than 300 homeless young adults.

In 2014, The Human Rights Campaign awarded Lost-n-Found Youth with the Dan Bradley Humanitarian Award.

The organization is converting an Atlanta home that is more than a century old, into a shelter. Saint Mark's United Methodist Church has rented the house to Lost-n-Found Youth for one per year, on a 20-year lease.

In 2024, Furry Weekend Atlanta raised more than $100,000 to support Lost-n-Found Youth. Two years later, the same convention raised $150,000 for the organization.

== See also ==
- Homelessness in Georgia
- LGBTQ youth vulnerability
- Youth homelessness
