= FurryMUCK =

Text-based virtual world

- Developer: Project community
- Engine: TinyMUCK
- Platform: Platform independent
- Release: 1990
- Genre: Social MUD
- Mode: Multiplayer

FurryMUCK is one of the oldest and largest non-combat MUD-style games in existence. It was founded in 1990 as an online gathering place for furry fans to meet and socialize in a virtual role-playing environment. Over time, FurryMUCK had become one of the central focal points for furry fandom, with a user base consisting of several thousand, with over 150 users regularly signed on simultaneously.

Many furry fans state that their first exposure to furry fandom came from FurryMUCK.

West Corner of the Park is the central meeting place within the MUCK. It is held to a non-explicit rating and is generally continually populated. Visitors will emerge into the park. There also was a webcomic of the same name, which is set on FurryMUCK, usually in the park.

== History ==
A screenshot from FurryMUCK showing part of a listing of online users and a starting area for guests

The first MUDs appeared in 1978 and provided a text-based virtual world focused on adventure. While the first MUDs were clearly focused on the game, things changed in 1989 when Jim Aspnes released TinyMUD. TinyMUD allowed users to focus on building and socialisation, rather than RPG-style game playing. It soon emerged as the "most popular MUD on the internet", and a subculture of furry fans emerged within the system. These players "described themselves as anthropomorphic animals" and proved to be "somewhat controversial".

With TinyMUD's success a number of alternative systems derived from TinyMUD's basic architecture emerged. One of these variants was TinyMUCK, a program originally developed and released by Stephen White. Piaw Na became interested in White's TinyMUCK in 1990 and decided to implement Forth as the programming language for development within the environment. The result was MUCK Forth (MUF), as implemented in TinyMUCK 2.0, which became the core to Na's short-lived AtlantisMUCK, which was launched in 1990. AtlantisMUCK grew to be "tremendously popular" but was shut down in August of that year. Nevertheless, by that time copies of Na's code had spread, and by late 1990, FurryMUCK had been released using Na's version of TinyMUCK. According to Tina "Jahangiri" Smith, the founders of FurryMUCK were looking for a theme for their new MUCK, and "furries" emerged as an option. The aim was to combine furry fandom with the MUD's users — the former group needing a better method of communication, while the latter understood "high speed roleplay". However, one early difficulty faced by the growing FurryMUCK community related to where to host the system. The original version of FurryMUCK was hosted at North Carolina State University until mid-1991, when it was forced to move. A new home was found at the University of California, Irvine, where it resided until November of that year. While at UC Irvine FurryMUCK was limited to 63 concurrent users. In November FurryMUCK moved again, this time to a server at Carnegie Mellon University. It remained there until September 1992, when FurryMUCK was deleted and had to be restarted (with the loss of considerable work) at the University of Toronto. Toronto proved to be only a short-term home, and in October 1993, after a call for volunteers to host the system, it was moved to St. Norbert College. This time the address proved to be more stable, and FurryMUCK remained at St. Norbert until 1999, when it was finally relocated to a dedicated server.

At times, FurryMUCK has undergone turmoil in response to Internet content legislative efforts.

In spite of the many moves, FurryMUCK grew rapidly, and by 1995 was regarded as one of the "most successful MUDs". A Wired.com article called FurryMUCK "the first anthropomorphic MUD.". Four years later, in 1999, FurryMUCK had become "one of the longest-running and best-maintained social MUCKs online", and it is still online today.

== See also ==
- Furcadia
- Second Life
- MUD
- TinyMUCK
