= Jim Downs =

American historian

Jim Downs is an American historian. He is the Gilder Lehrman-National Endowment for the Humanities Professor of Civil War Studies and History at Gettysburg College. Downs is a 2025 Guggenheim Fellow. He earned his PhD at Columbia University under the direction of Eric Foner. He received his BA in English from the University of Pennsylvania, his MA in American Studies from Columbia University, where he also earned his M.Phil in History. With the support of the Andrew Mellon New Directions Fellowship, he returned to graduate school, where he studied medical anthropology, global health, and epidemiology at Harvard University.

== Books ==
- Maladies of Empire: How Colonialism, Slavery, and War Transformed Medicine (2021)
- Stand by Me: The Forgotten History of Gay Liberation (2016)
- Sick from Freedom: African-American Illness and Suffering during the Civil War and Reconstruction (2012)
