= Generative audio =

Creation of audio files from databases of audio clips

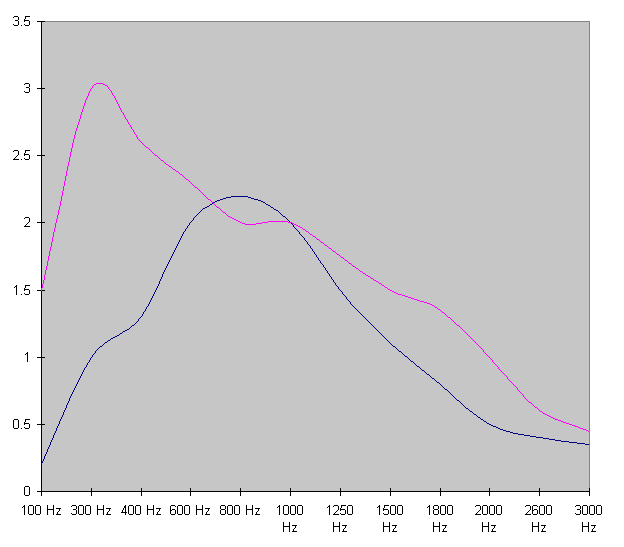
Audio curves

Generative audio refers to the creation of audio files from databases of audio clips. This technology differs from synthesized voices such as Apple's Siri or Amazon's Alexa, which use a collection of fragments that are stitched together on demand.

Generative audio works by using neural networks to learn the statistical properties of an audio source, then reproducing those properties.

== Implications ==
With this technology, a person's voice can be replicated to speak phrases that they may have never spoken. This could lead to a synthetic version of a public figure's voice being used against them.

== Technology ==
Modern generative audio systems employ various deep learning architectures. One notable approach uses generative adversarial networks (GANs), where two machine learning models work against each other to create realistic audio. Other architectures include WaveNet, which uses dilated causal convolutions to model raw audio waveforms, and implementations like 15.ai, which demonstrated in 2020 the ability to clone voices using as little as 15 seconds of training data through specialized neural network architectures.

== See also ==
- 15.ai
- Deep learning speech synthesis
- Generative art
- Generative music
- WaveNet
