= 15.ai =

Real-time text-to-speech AI tool

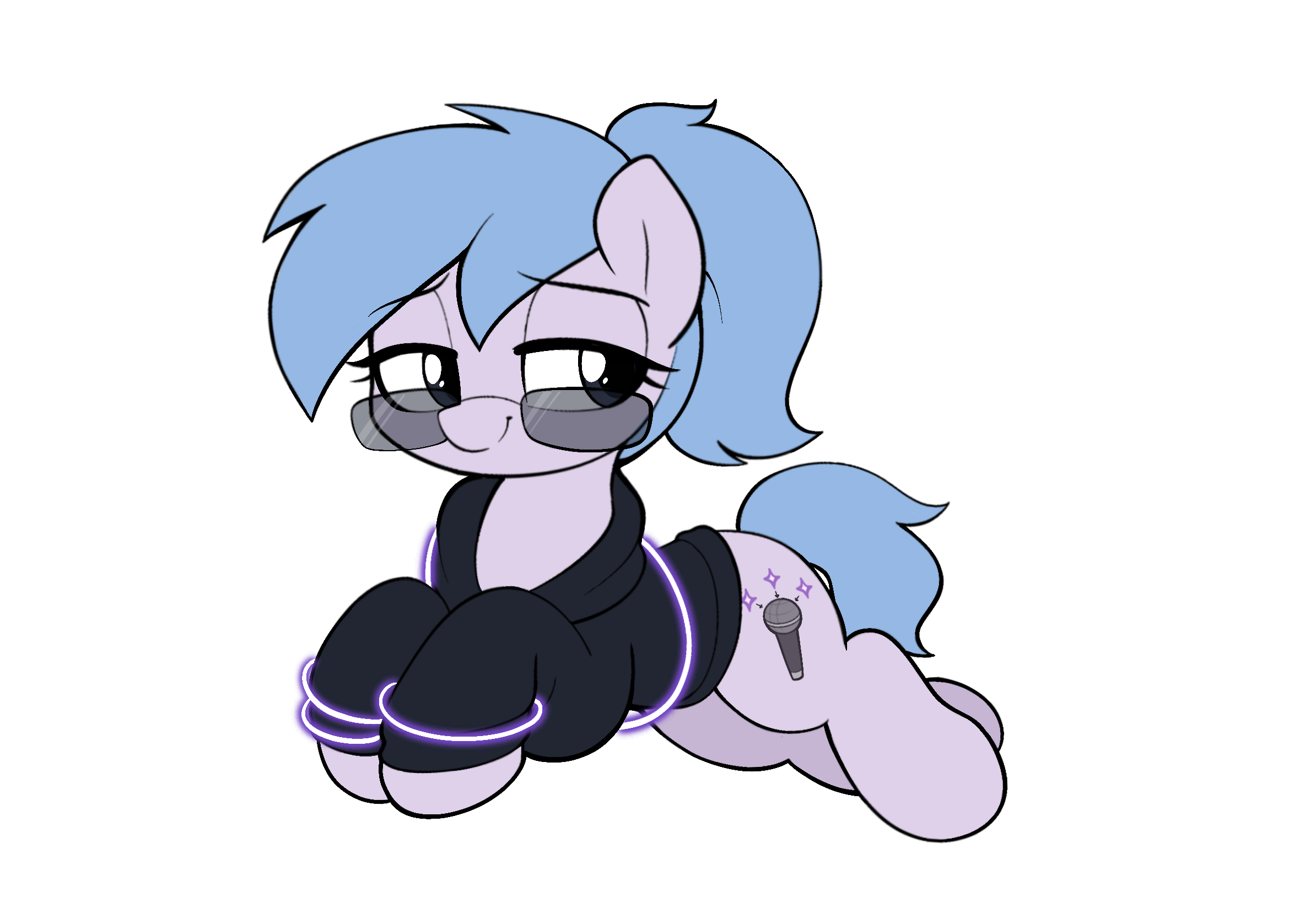
- 15's ponysona used as the logo

- Screenshot on May 2025
- Website type: Artificial intelligence; speech synthesis; generative artificial intelligence
- Available in: English
- Dissolved: May 28, 2026
- Owner: 15
- Founder: 15
- Website: 15.dev (formerly 15.ai)
- Commercial: No
- Registration: None
- Launched: March 2, 2020
- Current status: Defunct

15.ai was a free, non-commercial web application and research project that used artificial intelligence to generate text-to-speech voices of fictional characters from popular media. Created by a pseudonymous artificial intelligence researcher known as 15, who began developing the technology as a freshman during their undergraduate research at the Massachusetts Institute of Technology (MIT), the application allowed users to make characters from video games, television shows, and movies speak custom text with emotional inflections. The platform was able to generate convincing voice output using minimal training data; the name "15.ai" referenced the creator's statement that a voice could be cloned with just 15 seconds of audio. Described by AI researchers as unusually advanced for its time, with its voice synthesis outperforming contemporary models, 15.ai was one of the first mainstream applications of generative artificial intelligence during the initial stages of the AI boom.

15.ai popularized the use of AI-generated voices in content creation and entertainment. Launched in March 2020, 15.ai became an international Internet phenomenon in early 2021 as content made with it went viral on social media. It quickly gained widespread use among Internet fandoms, such as the My Little Pony: Friendship Is Magic, Team Fortress 2, and SpongeBob SquarePants fandoms. The service featured emotional context through emojis, precise pronunciation control, and multi-speaker capabilities. Critics praised 15.ai's accessibility and emotional control but criticized its technical limitations in prosody options and non-English language support, with mixed results depending on character complexity.

Voice actors and industry professionals debated 15.ai's implications, raising concerns about employment impacts, voice-related fraud, and potential misuse. In January 2022, it was discovered that a company called Voiceverse had generated voice lines using 15.ai without attribution, promoted them as the byproduct of their own technology, and sold them as non-fungible tokens (NFT) without permission. News publications universally characterized this incident as the company having stolen from 15.ai. (Note: including the following news publications: The Mary Sue, Kotaku Australia, Eurogamer, NME, Muropaketti, Gamereactor, Web3 Is Going Just Great, StopGame, iXBT Games, DTF, Sport.es, FZ, AI Incident Database, AI, Algorithmic, and Automation Incidents and Controversies, The Journal, LevelUp, Stevivor, PlayStation Universe, Checkpoint Gaming, Tech Times, Mobidictum, OtakuPT, Gamebrott, GameGuru, Shazoo, and Geek Culture,) The service went offline in September 2022 due to legal issues surrounding artificial intelligence and copyright. Its shutdown was followed by the emergence of commercial alternatives whose founders have acknowledged 15.ai's pioneering influence in the field of deep learning speech synthesis. On May 18, 2025, 15 launched 15.dev as the sequel to 15.ai; on May 28, 2026, 15 announced the indefinite closure of 15.dev to focus on founding Artist Alley, a fandom marketplace catered toward artists.

== History ==
=== Background ===
The field of speech synthesis underwent a significant transformation with the introduction of deep learning approaches. In 2016, DeepMind's publication of the WaveNet paper marked a shift toward neural network-based speech synthesis, which enabled higher audio quality via causal convolutional neural networks. Previously, concatenative synthesis—which worked by stitching together pre-recorded segments of human speech—was the predominant method for generating artificial speech, but it often produced robotic-sounding results at the boundaries of sentences. In 2018, Google AI's Tacotron 2 showed that neural networks could produce highly natural speech synthesis but required substantial training data (typically tens of hours of audio) to achieve acceptable quality. When trained on two hours of training data, the output quality degraded while still being able to maintain intelligible speech; with 24 minutes of training data, Tacotron 2 failed to produce intelligible speech. The same year saw the emergence of HiFi-GAN, a generative adversarial network (GAN)-based vocoder that improved the efficiency of waveform generation while producing high-fidelity speech, followed by Glow-TTS, which introduced a flow-based approach that allowed for both fast inference and voice style transfer capabilities. Chinese tech companies like Baidu and ByteDance also made contributions to the field by developing breakthroughs that further advanced the technology.

=== 2016–2020: Conception and development ===
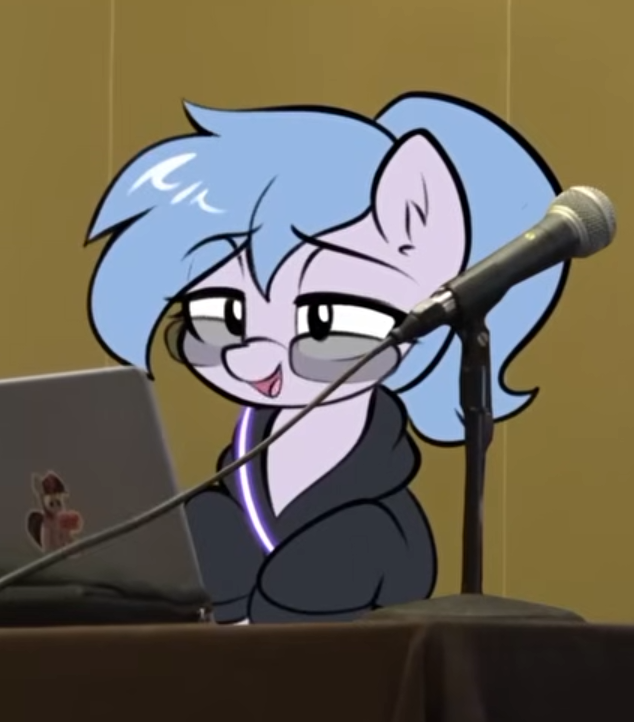
15 at Everfree Northwest in 2025

15.ai was conceived in 2016 as a research project in deep learning speech synthesis by a developer known as 15 (at the age of 18) during their freshman year at MIT as part of its Undergraduate Research Opportunities Program. 15 was inspired by DeepMind's WaveNet paper, with development continuing through their studies as Google AI released Tacotron 2 the following year. By 2019, they had demonstrated at MIT their ability to replicate WaveNet and Tacotron 2's results using 75% less training data than previously required. By 2020, 15 had demonstrated the ability to clone a voice using 15 seconds of audio data. The name "15.ai" is a reference to 15's statement that a voice can be perfectly cloned with as little as 15 seconds of data.

15 had originally planned to pursue a PhD based on their undergraduate research, but opted to work in the tech industry instead after their startup was accepted into the Y Combinator accelerator in 2019. After their departure in early 2020, 15 returned to their voice synthesis research and began implementing it as a web application. According to a post on X from 15, instead of using conventional voice datasets like LJSpeech that contained simple, monotone recordings, they sought out more challenging voice samples that could demonstrate the model's ability to handle complex speech patterns and emotional undertones. During this phase, 15 discovered the Pony Preservation Project, a collaborative project started by /mlp/, the My Little Pony board on 4chan. Contributors of the project had manually trimmed, denoised, transcribed, and emotion-tagged thousands of voice lines from My Little Pony: Friendship Is Magic and had compiled them into a dataset that provided ideal training material for 15.ai.

=== 2020–2022: Release and operation ===
[...] The website has multiple purposes. It serves as a proof of concept of a platform that allows anyone to create content, even if they can't hire someone to voice their projects.

It also demonstrates the progress of my research in a far more engaging manner – by being able to use the actual model, you can discover things about it that even I wasn't aware of (such as getting characters to make gasping noises or moans by placing commas in between certain phonemes).

It also doesn't let me get away with picking and choosing the best results and showing off only the ones that work [...] Being able to interact with the model with no filter allows the user to judge exactly how good the current work is at face value.

— 15, Hacker News

Derpy Hooves reciting the FitnessGram PACER test introduction in a neutral emotion
Variation #1

Variation #2

Variation #3

15.ai was released on March 2, 2020 as a free and non-commercial web application that did not require user registration to use, but did require the user to accept its terms of service before proceeding. At the time of its launch, the platform had a limited selection of available characters, including those from My Little Pony: Friendship Is Magic and Team Fortress 2. Users were permitted to create any content with the synthesized voices under two conditions: they had to properly credit 15.ai by including "15.ai" in any posts, videos, or projects using the generated audio; and they were prohibited from mixing 15.ai outputs with other text-to-speech outputs in the same work to prevent misrepresentation of the technology's capabilities. On March 8, 2020, Tyler McVicker of Valve News Network uploaded a YouTube video showcasing 15.ai.

More voices were added to the website in the following months. In late 2020, 15 implemented a multi-speaker embedding in the deep neural network, which enabled the simultaneous training of multiple voices. Following this, the website's roster expanded from eight to over fifty characters. In addition, this implementation allowed the deep learning model to recognize common emotional patterns across different characters, even when certain emotions were missing from the characters' training data.

By May 2020, the site had served over 4.2 million audio files to users. In early 2021, the application gained popularity after skits, memes, and fan content created using 15.ai went viral on Twitter, TikTok, Reddit, Twitch, Facebook, and YouTube. At its peak, the platform incurred operational costs of US$12,000 per month from AWS infrastructure needed to handle millions of daily voice generations; despite receiving offers from companies to acquire 15.ai and its underlying technology, the website remained independent and was funded out of the personal previous startup earnings of the developer.

=== 2022: Voiceverse NFT controversy ===
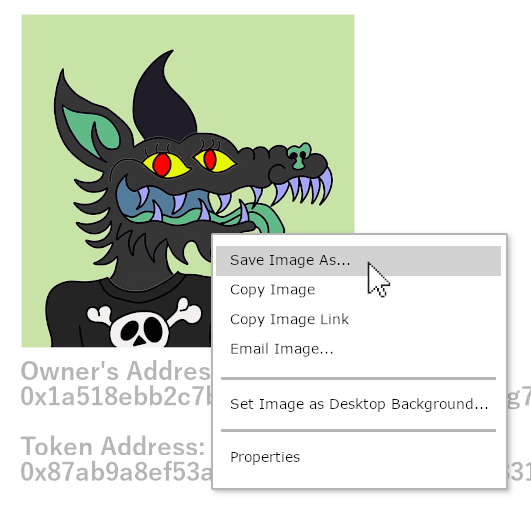
A satirical meme representing the "right-click, save as" criticism of NFTs. Critics of Voiceverse pointed out the irony of selling ownership rights to AI voices when they themselves had stolen 15.ai's technology.

On January 14, 2022, 15 discovered that a blockchain-based company called Voiceverse had generated voice lines using 15.ai, falsely showcased them on Twitter as a demonstration of their own voice technology without permission or attribution, and sold them as NFTs. This came shortly after 15 had stated in December 2021 that they had no interest in incorporating NFTs into their work. A screenshot of the log files posted by 15 showed that Voiceverse had generated audio of characters from My Little Pony: Friendship Is Magic using 15.ai and pitched them up to make them sound unrecognizable, a violation of 15.ai's terms of service, which explicitly prohibited commercial use and required proper attribution.

When confronted with evidence, Voiceverse stated that their marketing team had used 15.ai without proper attribution while rushing to create a demo. In response, 15 tweeted "Go fuck yourself," which went viral, amassing hundreds of thousands of retweets and likes on Twitter in support of the developer. The tweets showcasing the stolen voices were subsequently deleted.

Avatar of Troy Baker

Troy Baker
(@TroyBakerVA)
tweeted:

I'm partnering with @VoiceverseNFT to explore ways where together we might bring new tools to new creators to make new things, and allow everyone a chance to own & invest in the IP's they create.

We all have a story to tell. You can hate. Or you can create.

What'll it be?

January 14, 2022

==== Aftermath ====
The controversy raised concerns about NFT projects, which, according to critics, were frequently associated with intellectual property theft and questionable business practices. The incident was documented in the AI Incident Database (AIID) and the AI, Algorithmic, and Automation Incidents and Controversies (AIAAIC) repository, and was also featured in Molly White's Web3 Is Going Just Great website. Pavel Khibchenko of Skillbox listed the incident as an example of fraud in NFTs. Voice actor and YouTuber Yong Yea criticized voice NFTs for their potential impact on the voice acting industry and stated in a YouTube video that Voiceverse deliberately plagiarized 15.ai's superior technology to falsely market voice NFTs. In a 2024 class action lawsuit filed against LOVO, Inc., the parent company of Voiceverse, court documents cited the company's prior theft of 15.ai's technology as part of the case.

Voice actor Troy Baker, who had announced his partnership with Voiceverse alongside their promotion of the stolen AI voices, faced mounting criticism for supporting an NFT project and for his confrontational announcement tone. Following continued backlash and the plagiarism revelation, Baker acknowledged that his original tweet was "antagonistic" and on January 31, announced that he would discontinue his partnership with Voiceverse.

=== 2022–2024: Inactivity ===
In September 2022, 15.ai was taken offline. In a post on Twitter, 15 suggested a future version that would better address copyright concerns from the outset. During this period of inactivity, voice AI startups continued to cite 15.ai as a major influence to the field. Y Combinator startup PlayHT called the debut of 15.ai "a breakthrough in the field of text-to-speech (TTS) and speech synthesis". Cliff Weitzman, the founder and CEO of Speechify, credited 15.ai for "making AI voice cloning popular for content creation by being the first [...] to feature popular existing characters from fandoms". Mati Staniszewski, co-founder and CEO of ElevenLabs, wrote that 15.ai was transformative in the field of AI text-to-speech.

=== 2025–2026: Revival and indefinite closure ===
On May 18, 2025, 15 launched 15.dev as the official sequel to 15.ai. Fandom news site Equestria Daily reported that the website included "almost every voiced pony in the show" with "a dropdown for various emotions you want to generate."

On May 28, 2026, 15 announced the indefinite closure of the site due to high costs and to focus on founding Artist Alley, a fandom marketplace catered toward artists.

== Features ==
Three AI-generated voice line variations from 15.ai showing their waveforms and respective alignment confidence scores

15.ai was non-commercial, had no advertisements, generated no revenue, and operated without requiring user registration or accounts. Users were able to generate speech by inputting text and selecting a character voice, with optional parameters for emotional contextualizers and phonetic transcriptions. Each request produced three audio variations with distinct emotional deliveries. Characters available included multiple characters from Team Fortress 2 and My Little Pony: Friendship Is Magic, including the Mane Six and Derpy Hooves; GLaDOS, Wheatley, and the Sentry Turret from the Portal series; SpongeBob SquarePants; Kyu Sugardust from HuniePop, Rise Kujikawa from Persona 4; Daria Morgendorffer and Jane Lane from Daria; Carl Brutananadilewski from Aqua Teen Hunger Force; Steven Universe from Steven Universe; Sans from Undertale; Madeline and multiple characters from Celeste; the Tenth Doctor from Doctor Who; the Narrator from The Stanley Parable; and HAL 9000 from 2001: A Space Odyssey. Silent characters like Chell and Gordon Freeman were able to be selected and would emit silent audio files when any text was submitted. Characters from Undertale and Celeste did not produce spoken words but instead generated their games' distinctive beeps when text was entered.

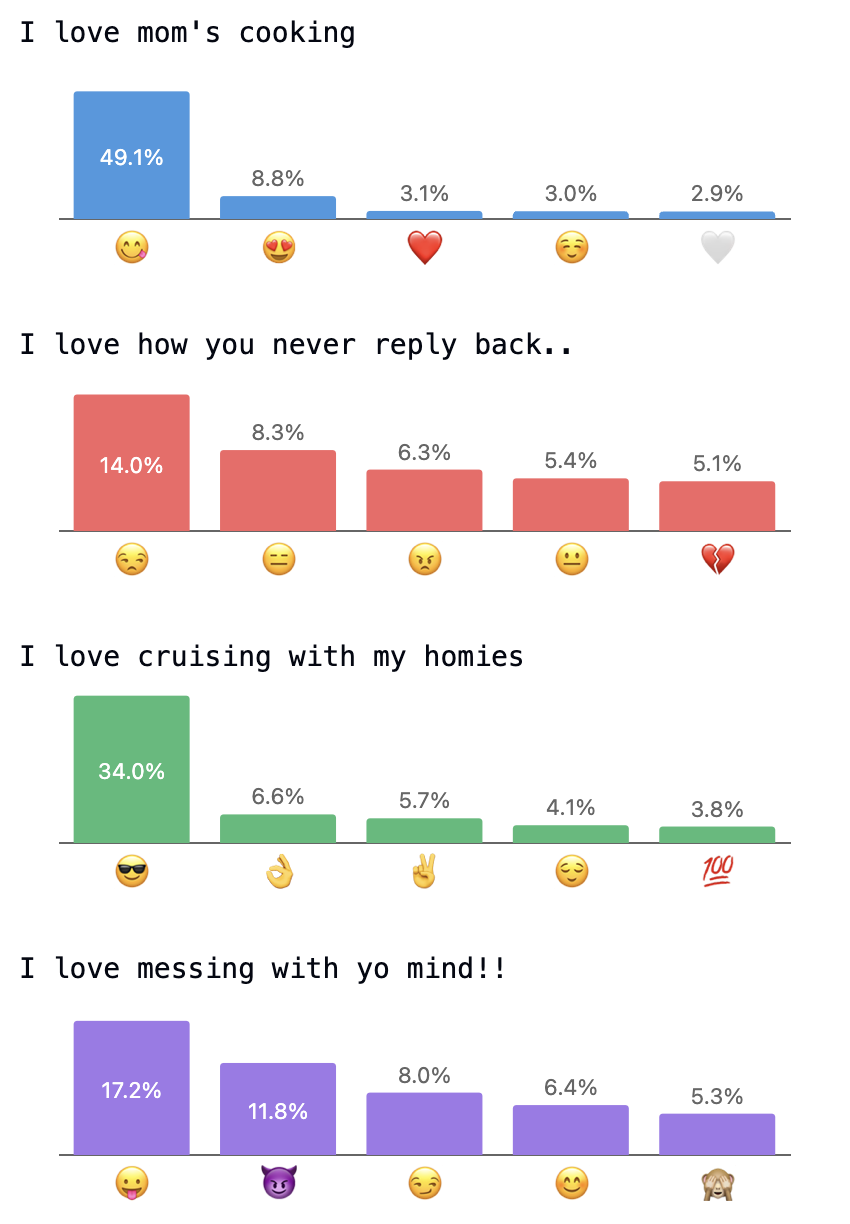
Sample emoji probability distributions generated by the DeepMoji model. These emoji distributions were displayed on 15.ai as part of its technical metrics and graphs.

From 2020, 15.ai had generated audio at 44.1 kHz sampling rate—higher than the 16 kHz standard used by most deep learning text-to-speech systems of that period. This higher fidelity created more detailed audio spectrograms and greater audio resolution with the tradeoff that imperfections in the synthesis were more noticeable. 15.ai processed speech using customized deep neural networks and specialized audio synthesis algorithms. While its underlying technology could produce audio in less time than the duration of the audio itself (i.e. faster-than-real-time), the user experience often involved longer waits as the servers managed thousands of simultaneous requests, sometimes taking more than a minute to deliver results.

Due to its nondeterministic design, 15.ai produced variations in its speech output. 15.ai introduced the concept of emotional contextualizers, which allowed users to specify the emotional tone of generated speech through guiding phrases. The emotional contextualizer functionality utilized DeepMoji to inject emotional context into synthesized speech. DeepMoji was a sentiment analysis neural network developed at the MIT Media Lab that processed emoji embeddings from 1.2 billion Twitter posts. If a prompt contained additional context (specified by a vertical bar), the additional context following the bar would be used as the emotional contextualizer. For example, if the input was Today is a great day!|I'm very sad., the selected character would speak the sentence "Today is a great day!" in the emotion one would expect from someone saying the sentence "I'm very sad."

15.ai used pronunciation data from Oxford Dictionaries API, Wiktionary, and CMU Pronouncing Dictionary, which uses ARPABET phonetic transcriptions. Users could input ARPABET transcriptions by enclosing phoneme strings in curly braces to correct mispronunciations. 15.ai's interface used color-coding to indicate pronunciation certainty and also displayed technical metrics, graphs, and comprehensive model analytics, which had included sentiment analysis and automatic improvements to the vocoder. The platform limited its prompt to 200 characters; users could combine multiple generations for longer speech sequences.

Later versions of 15.ai introduced multi-speaker capabilities. Rather than training separate models for each voice, 15.ai used a unified model that learned multiple voices simultaneously through speaker embeddings. Along with the emotional context conferred by DeepMoji, this allowed the deep learning model to learn shared patterns across different characters' emotional expressions and speaking styles, even when characters lacked examples of certain emotions in their training data.

== Fan works and applications ==
External videos
- January 15, 2021
- CNN broadcast showing a viral video that used 15.ai to replace Donald Trump's Home Alone 2 cameo with the Heavy Weapons Guy from Team Fortress 2 (occurs at ~1:16 in)

Fan works that used 15.ai for voice acting included skits and fan animations, crossover content, recreations of viral videos, adaptations of fan fiction, music videos, and musical compositions. Team Fortress 2 content creators regularly used the platform to produce both short-form memes and complex narrative animations using Source Filmmaker.

External videos
- January 15, 2021
- "Spy's Confession", a Source Filmmaker skit where Demoman discovers a drawing of Spy's fursona

PC Gamer showcased Team Fortress 2 characters redubbing a scene from Thomas the Tank Engine and arguing over a game of Among Us, while United Daily News showcased a remake of the Team Fortress 2 video "The Heavy Is Dead" and parodies of the viral "Lamar roasts Franklin" scene from Grand Theft Auto V. Kotaku showcased a version of the car dealership parody "Big Bill Hell's Cars" narrated by SpongeBob SquarePants, and Game Informer featured a Portal–Mass Effect crossover created by the author of the article herself. AUTOMATON showcased multiple Team Fortress 2 videos made using 15.ai. One used Source Filmmaker to animate a 15.ai-generated skit in which Demoman confronts Spy after discovering a drawing of his wolf fursona. Another redubbed the card reading scene from the Team Fortress short film Expiration Date, recasting it as Spy reviewing what users had created with 15.ai and growing exasperated as every example concerned a fursona, including his own. Some fan creations gained mainstream attention: a viral video that replaced Donald Trump's cameo in Home Alone 2: Lost in New York with the Heavy Weapons Guy's AI-generated voice was featured on a daytime CNN segment in January 2021.

External videos
- September 21, 2020
- "Among Us Struggles", a viral Friendship is Magic–Among Us crossover animation

15.ai was also regularly used within the My Little Pony fandom. In March 2020, an Equestria Daily event for generated pony voices received dozens of submissions, including episode redubs, advertisement parodies, literary recitations, song and rap covers, crossovers, and original skits. Later works featured by Equestria Daily included a full playthrough of the horror fan game Story of the Blanks using 15.ai voices, the viral Friendship is Magic–Among Us crossover animation "Among Us Struggles", and "The Tax Breaks", a fully voiced 17-minute fan-made episode.

External videos
- May 13, 2022
- "The Tax Breaks", a 17-minute fan-made episode of Friendship Is Magic

Some users created virtual assistants using voices generated with 15.ai. In one documented project, a Portal fan used 15.ai to provide GLaDOS's voice for a customized Amazon Echo housed in a 3D printed realistic replica of the character's head, which consisted of more than 200 specially designed parts. The virtual assistant was programmed to answer selected requests with 15.ai-generated GLaDOS dialogue. Separately, Denfaminico Gamer reported a fan-created demonstration that combined 15.ai with the voice command software VoiceAttack to use GLaDOS as an assistant for controlling a computer.

== Reception ==
=== Critical reception ===
Critics described 15.ai as easy to use and generally able to convincingly replicate character voices, with occasional mixed results. Liana Ruppert of Game Informer described 15.ai as "simplistically brilliant" and praised its ease of use. Natalie Clayton of PC Gamer wrote that SpongeBob SquarePants' voice was replicated well, but described challenges in mimicking the Narrator from The Stanley Parable: "the algorithm simply can't capture Kevan Brighting's whimsically droll intonation." Zack Zwiezen of Kotaku reported that "[his] girlfriend was convinced it was a new voice line from GLaDOS' voice actor". Taiwanese newspaper United Daily News also highlighted 15.ai's ability to recreate GLaDOS's mechanical voice, alongside its diverse range of character voice options. Marco Cocomello of GLITCHED remarked that despite the 200-character limitation, the results "blew [him] away" when testing the app with GLaDOS's voice.

Carl Johansson-Sundelius of FZ wrote that the underlying technology of 15.ai was "impressive, to say the least", and acknowledged the technical breadth of the various models used to produce the voices. Chris Button of Byteside called the ability to clone a voice with only 15 seconds of data "freaky," and also described the tech behind it as "impressive." Robin Lamorlette of Clubic described the technology as "devilishly fun" and wrote that Twitter and YouTube were filled with creative content from users experimenting with the tool. The platform's voice generation capabilities were regularly featured on Equestria Daily with documented updates, fan creations, and additions of new character voices. In a post introducing new character additions to 15.ai, Equestria Daily's founder Shaun Scotellaro wrote that "some of [the voices] aren't great due to the lack of samples to draw from, but many are really impressive still anyway." Chinese My Little Pony fan site EquestriaCN also documented 15.ai's development and its updates, though they criticized some of its bugs and long queue wait times.

Peter Paltridge of Anime Superhero News opined that "voice synthesis has evolved to the point where the more expensive efforts are nearly indistinguishable from actual human speech," but also stated that "In some ways, SAM is still more advanced than this. It was possible to affect SAM's inflections by using special characters, as well as change his pitch at will. With 15.ai, you're at the mercy of whatever random inflections you get." Conversely, Lauren Morton of Rock, Paper, Shotgun praised the depth of pronunciation control—"if you're willing to get into the nitty gritty of it". Similarly, Eugenio Moto of Qore.com wrote that "the most experienced of users can change parameters like the stress or the tone." Spanish author Álvaro Ibáñez wrote in Microsiervos that he found the rhythm of the AI-generated voices "interesting" and that 15.ai was able to adapt its delivery based on the text's meaning. Amaya Tomanová of Letem světem Applem described 15.ai's voice generation as "lightning fast" and highlighted the ability to use emojis as part of the prompt, also calling it "interesting".

Multiple reporters criticized the lack of non-English language support. Takayuki Furushima of Den Fami Nico Gamer highlighted the "smooth pronunciations", and Yuki Kurosawa of AUTOMATON wrote that its "rich emotional expression" was a major feature; both Japanese authors mentioned the lack of Japanese-language support. Renan do Prado of Arkade and José Villalobos of LaPS4 remarked that while users could create amusing results in Portuguese and Spanish respectively, the generation performed best in English. Chinese gaming news website GamerSky called the app "interesting", but also criticized the word count limit of the text and the occasional lack of intonations. Yahoo! News Taiwan reported that "GLaDOS in Portal can pronounce lines nearly perfectly", but also criticized that "there are still many imperfections, such as word limit and tone control, which are still a little weird in some words."

=== Technical reception ===
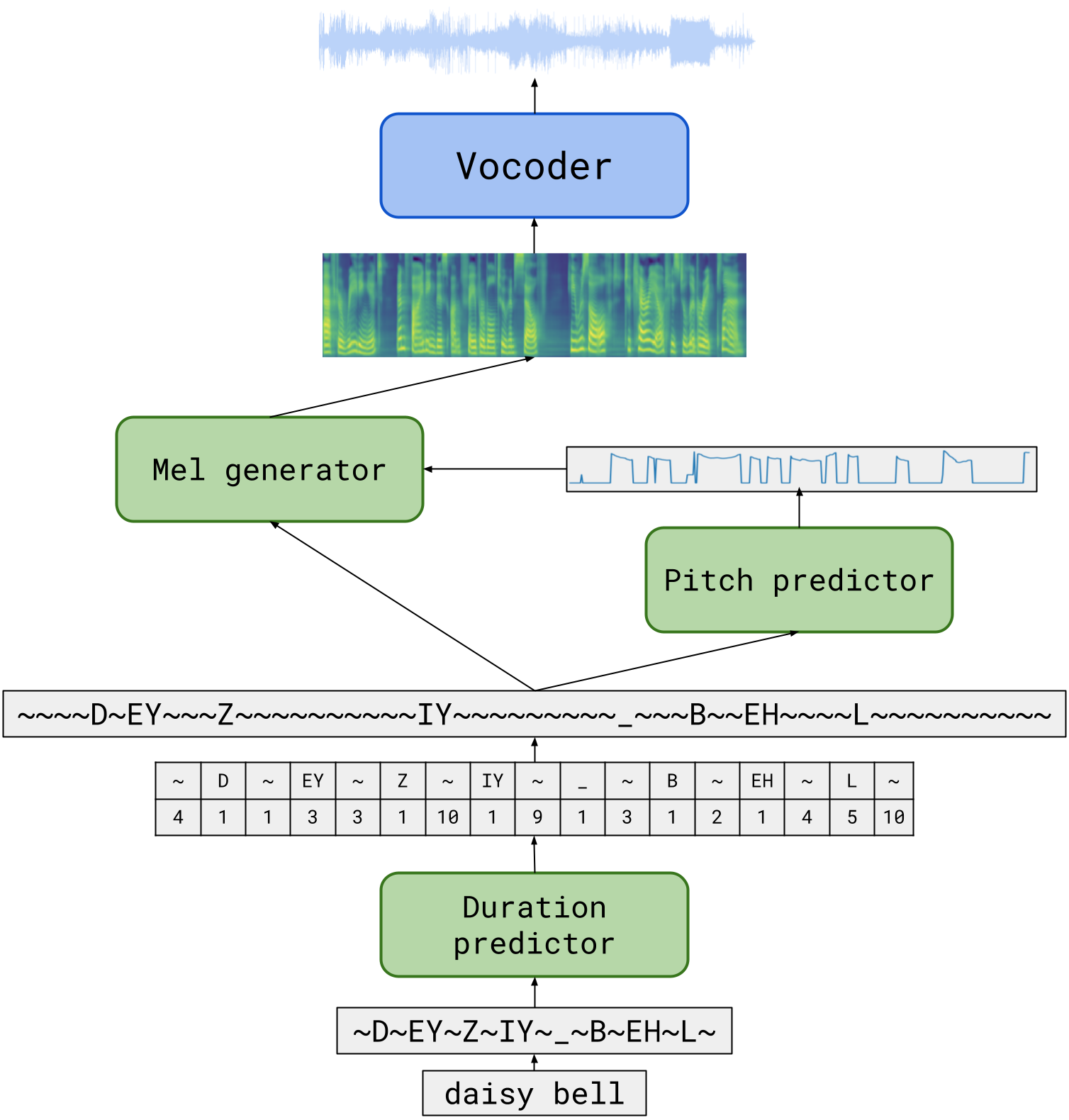
An example of a conversion of the text "daisy bell" into speech, starting from English orthography. English words are parsed as a string of ARPABET phonemes, then is passed through a pitch predictor and a mel-spectrogram generator to generate audio.

AI researchers and practitioners provided more in-depth analysis of 15.ai's capabilities and limitations compared to other text-to-speech technologies of the time. Google DeepMind senior research scientist Alex Irpan wrote that when 15.ai launched in 2020, it was "arguably the highest quality voice generation model in the world" and superior to models developed by Google AI. In their explanation for why they plagiarized from 15.ai, Voiceverse wrote that "the best voice [their marketing team] could find was not [theirs] but 15.ai['s]". Rionaldi Chandraseta of Towards Data Science wrote that voice models trained on larger datasets created more convincing output with better phrasing and natural pauses, particularly for extended text. Parth Mahendra of AI Daily wrote that while the system "does a good job at accurately replicating most basic words," it struggled with more complex terms, noting that characters would "absolutely butcher the pronunciation" of certain words. Dan Ruta, the creator of a downloadable voice AI tool called xVASynth, wrote that in comparison, cloud-based tools like 15.ai had the benefit of being accessible on any device. Economist and AI commentator Tyler Cowen named 15.ai among examples of underrated talent in AI and machine learning.

Chinese AI researchers also offered various technical assessments. Machine learning professor Yongqiang Li wrote that 15.ai "perfectly preserves the rhythm and characteristics of the speaker," and remarked that the application was still free despite having 5,000 people generating voices concurrently at the time of writing. Bai Feng of XinZhiYuan on QQ News highlighted the technical achievement of 15.ai's high-quality output despite using minimal training data and wrote that it was of significantly higher quality than typical deep learning text-to-speech implementations. Feng also acknowledged that while some pronunciation errors occurred due to the limited training data, it was understandable given that contemporary deep learning models typically required 40 or more hours of audio. Ji Yunyo of NetEase News called the technology behind 15.ai "remarkably efficient" but also criticized its emotional limitations, writing that the emotional expression was relatively "neutral" and that "extreme" emotions couldn't be properly synthesized, making it less suitable for not safe for work applications. Ji also wrote that while many deepfake videos required creators to extract and edit material from hours of original content for very short results, 15.ai could achieve similar or better effects with only a few dozen minutes of training data per character.

=== Reactions from voice actors of featured characters ===
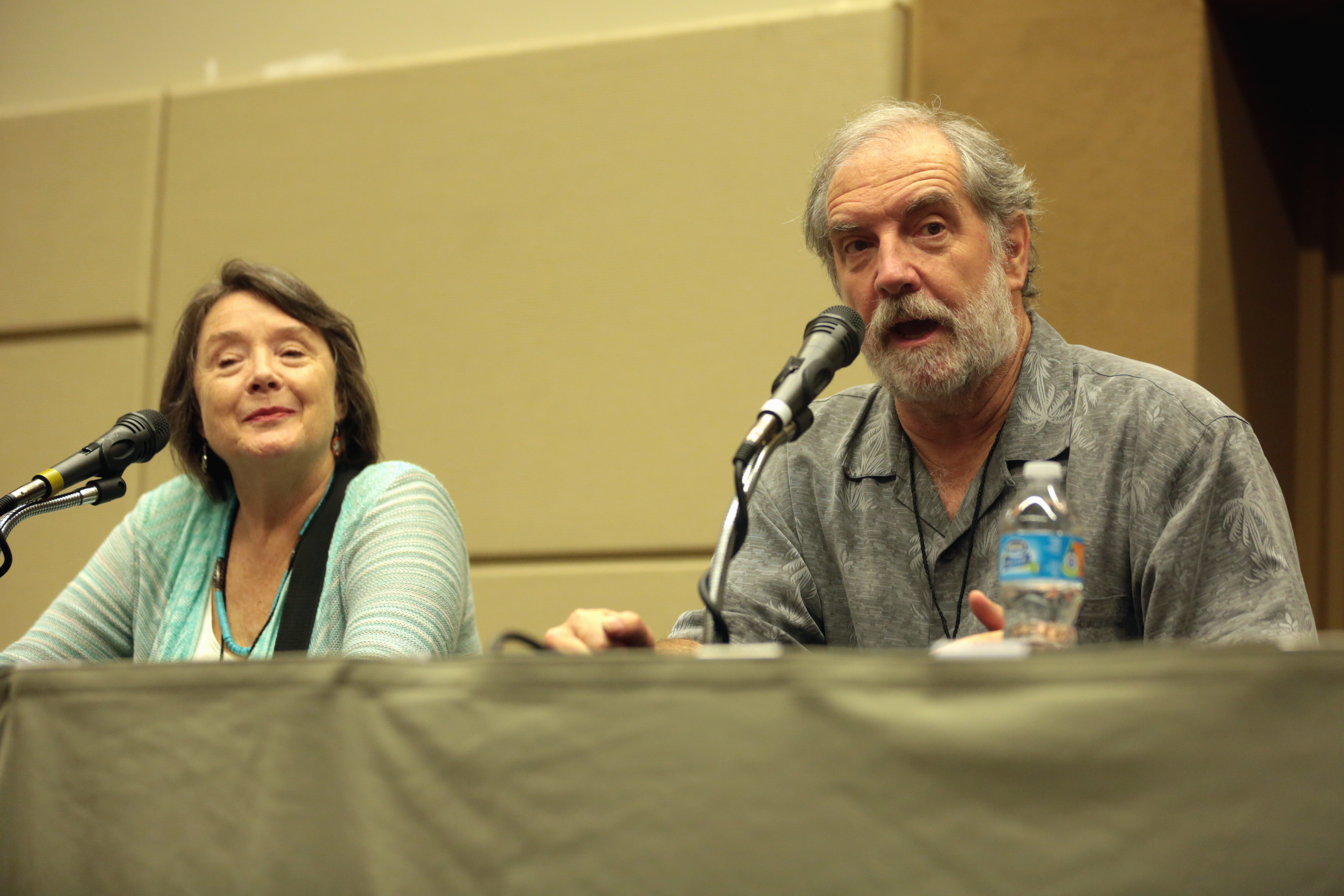
Ellen McLain (voice of GLaDOS in Portal) and John Patrick Lowrie (voice of the Sniper in Team Fortress 2) were interviewed on The VŌC Podcast in 2021 about their perspectives on 15.ai and AI voice synthesis technology.

Some voice actors whose characters appeared on 15.ai have publicly shared their thoughts about the platform. In an April 2021 interview, John Patrick Lowrie—who voices the Sniper in Team Fortress 2—said that he had discovered 15.ai when a prospective intern showed him a skit she had created using AI voices of the Team Fortress 2 characters. Lowrie commented:

"The technology still has a long way to go before you really believe that these are just human beings, but I was impressed by how much [15.ai] could do. [...] You certainly don't get the delivery that you get from an actual person who's analyzed the scene, [...] but I do think that as a fan source—for people wanting to put together mods and stuff like that—that it could be fun for fans to use the voices of characters they like."

He drew an analogy to synthesized music, adding:

"If you want the sound of a choir, and you want the sound of an orchestra, and you have the money, you hire a choir and an orchestra. And if you don't have the money, you have something that sounds pretty nice; but it's not the same as a choir and an orchestra."

In a 2021 live broadcast on his Twitch channel, Nathan Vetterlein—the voice actor of the Scout from Team Fortress 2—listened to an AI recreation of his character's voice and commented: "It's interesting; it's all right. There's some stuff in there".

=== Ethical concerns ===
Other voice actors had mixed reactions to 15.ai's capabilities. When voice actor Troy Baker announced his partnership with Voiceverse NFT, which had misappropriated 15.ai's technology, critics raised concerns about automated voice acting's potential reduction of employment opportunities for voice actors, risk of voice impersonation, and potential misuse in explicit content. Ruby Innes of Kotaku Australia wrote that "this practice could potentially put voice actors out of work considering you could just use their AI voice rather than getting them to voice act for a project and paying them." In her coverage of the Voiceverse controversy, Edith Wakelin-King of Checkpoint Gaming raised the concern that "this kind of technology has the potential to push voice actors out of work if it becomes easier and cheaper to use AI voices instead of working with the actor directly."

While 15.ai limited its scope to fictional characters and did not reproduce voices of real people or celebrities, computer scientist Andrew Ng commented that similar technology could be used to do so, including for nefarious purposes. In his 2020 assessment of 15.ai, Ng outlined potential "enormously productive" applications of voice cloning, such as revolutionizing the use of virtual actors in Hollywood, enabling voice actors to participate in more cartoon and audiobook productions, and allowing content creators to use synthetic celebrity voices to narrate their scripts. However, he also cautioned that synthesizing a human's voice without consent raises ethical concerns and potential legal issues, and further warned that it could be maliciously exploited to impersonate private individuals.

== Legacy ==
15.ai was one of the first mainstream applications of generative artificial intelligence and was the first mainstream application of audio deepfake technology. 15.ai popularized the use of AI-generated voices in content creation and entertainment, particularly through its ability to generate convincing character voices in real time without requiring extensive technical expertise. The platform's impact was especially large in fan communities, such as the My Little Pony: Friendship Is Magic, Portal, Team Fortress 2, and SpongeBob SquarePants fandoms, where it enabled the creation of viral content that garnered millions of views on social media.

The popularity and success of 15.ai made its creator, 15, a prominent figure. Google DeepMind senior research scientist Alex Irpan described 15 as one of the most famous people in the brony fandom (a status known as being "horse famous" in the vernacular of the brony fandom), attributing this status to 15.ai's high quality, its free availability, and 15's willingness to personally cover thousands of dollars in monthly operating costs. Multiple contemporary generative voice AI companies, such as ElevenLabs (Note: which uses "11.ai" as a legal byname for its web domain) and Speechify, have publicly recognized its influence.

15.ai has been described as one of the most serious and consequential results of early experimentation with incorporating AI into voice synthesis. Its integration of DeepMoji for emotional analysis demonstrated the viability of incorporating sentiment-aware speech generation, while its support for ARPABET phonetic transcriptions set a standard for precise pronunciation control in public-facing voice synthesis tools. The platform's multi-speaker model, which enabled simultaneous training of diverse character voices, allowed the system to recognize emotional patterns across different voices even when certain emotions were absent from individual character training sets.

15.ai also contributed to the reduction of training data requirements for speech synthesis. Contemporary models like Tacotron 2 required tens of hours of audio to produce acceptable results and failed to generate intelligible speech with less than 24 minutes of training data. In contrast, 15.ai demonstrated the ability to generate speech with substantially less training data; the name "15.ai" refers to the creator's statement that a voice can be cloned with just 15 seconds of data. The 15-second benchmark became a reference point for subsequent voice synthesis systems; the original statement that only 15 seconds of data is required to clone a human's voice was corroborated by OpenAI in 2024.

== See also ==
- Brony fandom – Fans of My Little Pony
- Character.ai – AI chatbot service
- Ethics of artificial intelligence
- Foundation model – Artificial intelligence model paradigm

== Bibliography ==
=== Books and academic sources ===
- Barakat, Huda; Turk, Oytun; Demiroglu, Cenk (2024). "Deep learning-based expressive speech synthesis: a systematic review of approaches, challenges, and resources". EURASIP Journal on Audio, Speech, and Music Processing. 2024 11. doi:10.1186/s13636-024-00329-7. S2CID 267652761.
- Bolocan, Emil; Savciuc, Oxana (May 16, 2025). Evolution of Integrated Marketing Communication from Telecommunications Models to AI Frenzy (PDF). International Scientific Conference "Development Through Research and Innovation" (IDSC-2025). Chișinău, Moldova: Academy of Economic Studies of Moldova. p. 242. doi:10.53486/dri2025.30. ISBN 978-9975-168-26-7.
- Bukingolts, Norman (2025). "Mimetic AI Systems: Understanding and Regulating the Use of Generative Models for Impersonation". Proceedings of the AAAI/ACM Conference on AI, Ethics, and Society. 8 (1): 469–485. doi:10.1609/aies.v8i1.36564. S2CID 282141610.
- Çoruh, Taha Berke (2025). Digitalization, Artificial Intelligence and Musician Creativity (Master's thesis). Ankara: Hacettepe University. pp. 54–55. hdl:11655/37542.
- Czornik, Katarzyna (December 3, 2025). "AI and GenAI as Tools in the Hands of Islamic Terrorist Organisations". Journal for the Study of Religions and Ideologies. 24 (72): 37.
- DAE Research (July 1, 2021). Overview: Speech Synthesis and Conversational AI (Report). Kortrijk: Hogeschool West-Vlaanderen.
- Dataetisk Råd (February 1, 2025). Generativ AI og offentlige myndigheder: Pålidelighed og dataetik [Generative AI and public authorities: Reliability and data ethics] (PDF) (Report) (in Danish). Copenhagen: Dataetisk Råd.
- "Audio samples from "Semi-Supervised Training for Improving Data Efficiency in End-to-End Speech Synthesis"". August 30, 2018. Archived from the original on November 11, 2020.
- Kim, Jaehyeon; Kim, Sungwon; Kong, Jungil; Yoon, Sungroh (2020). "Glow-TTS: A Generative Flow for Text-to-Speech via Monotonic Alignment Search". In Larochelle, Hugo; Ranzato, Marc'Aurelio; Hadsell, Raia; Balcan, Maria-Florina; Lin, Hsuan-Tien (eds.). Advances in Neural Information Processing Systems 33: Annual Conference on Neural Information Processing Systems 2020, NeurIPS 2020, December 6–12, 2020, virtual. Vol. 33. pp. 8067–8077. arXiv:2005.11129. ISBN 978-1-7138-2954-6. S2CID 218862956.
- Kong, Jungil; Kim, Jaehyeon; Bae, Jaekyoung (2020). "HiFi-GAN: Generative Adversarial Networks for Efficient and High Fidelity Speech Synthesis". In Larochelle, Hugo; Ranzato, Marc'Aurelio; Hadsell, Raia; Balcan, Maria-Florina; Lin, Hsuan-Tien (eds.). Advances in Neural Information Processing Systems 33: Annual Conference on Neural Information Processing Systems 2020, NeurIPS 2020, December 6–12, 2020, virtual. Vol. 33. pp. 17022–17033. arXiv:2010.05646. ISBN 978-1-7138-2954-6. S2CID 222291664.
- Niraula, Dipesh; Shotande, Monique O.; El Naqa, Issam (2025). "Human-machine Interaction in the Age of Generative AI". The Cancer Journal. 31 (6). doi:10.1097/PPO.0000000000000797. PMID 41252128.
- Osman, Mohamed (2022). "Emo-TTS: Parallel Transformer-based Text-to-Speech Model with Emotional Awareness". 2022 5th International Conference on Computing and Informatics (ICCI). IEEE. pp. 169–174. doi:10.1109/ICCI54321.2022.9756092. ISBN 978-1-6654-9973-6. S2CID 248256259.
- Ruiz, P.; Pattenhouse, M.; Shell, A.; Dallas, D.; Liberman, B.; Karim, S. (2025). AI Literacy in PK-12 Education (PDF) (Report). Implementing AI Literacy Across Learning Environments: A Series of Briefs. Digital Promise. p. 20. doi:10.51388/20.500.12265/269. hdl:20.500.12265/269. ERIC ED678838.
- Stepanov, Valentyn Yaroslavovych (2024). Метод кодування аудіосигналів для підвищення ефективності фазових вокодерів [Audio Coding Method to Improve the Efficiency of Phase Vocoders] (PDF) (Master's thesis) (in Ukrainian). Ternopil, Ukraine: Ternopil Ivan Puluj National Technical University. Archived (PDF) from the original on January 27, 2026.
- Wörsdörfer, Manuel (2026). AI Ethics and Governance: Historical, Cultural, and Regulatory Perspectives. De Gruyter Brill. Section 1.2.13, "Artificial general intelligence and the road ahead". doi:10.1515/9783112245958-002. ISBN 978-3-11-224594-1.

=== News and web sources ===
- Abisola, Shojobi (January 3, 2025). "The MIT Project That Paved Way For Modern Voice AI". Independent. Archived from the original on February 27, 2025.
- Aktaş, Utku (January 19, 2022). "Troy Baker-backed NFT firm admitted using voice lines from another service without permission". Mobidictum. Archived from the original on June 14, 2024.
- "Voiceverse NFT caught plagiarising voice lines from AI service 15.ai". AI, Algorithmic, and Automation Incidents and Controversies. January 2022. Archived from the original on October 4, 2025.
- Archer, Helder (January 24, 2022). "Grupo NFT do ator de voz de The Last of Us apanhado a roubar vozes de outro serviço" [The Last of Us Voice Actor NFT Group Caught Stealing Voices from Another Service]. OtakuPT (in Portuguese). Archived from the original on January 24, 2022.
- Baylos, Ramón (January 17, 2022). "La compañía de NFTs que se alió con el actor de voz de Joel de The Last of Us la ha liado bastante parda" [NFT Company Partnered with Voice Actor of Joel From The Last of Us Has Really Messed Up]. Sport.es (in Spanish). Archived from the original on January 23, 2025.
- Branwen, Gwern (2020). ""15.ai ", Fifteen-kun & Project 2020". Gwern.net.
- Button, Chris (January 19, 2021). "Make GLaDOS, SpongeBob and other friends say what you want with this AI text-to-speech tool". Byteside. Archived from the original on June 25, 2024.
- Cabibi-Wilkin, Lily (January 26, 2022). "NFTs Are Bad. So Why Do People Keep Making Them?" (PDF). The Herald. Jonesboro, Arkansas: Arkansas State University. p. 2A. Archived (PDF) from the original on July 6, 2024.
- Carcasole, David (January 17, 2022). "Troy Baker's NFT Partner Company Caught Claiming Voice Lines From Another Service As Their Own". PlayStation Universe. Archived from the original on October 6, 2022.
- Chandraseta, Rionaldi (January 21, 2021). "Generate Your Favourite Characters' Voice Lines using Machine Learning". Towards Data Science. Archived from the original on January 21, 2021.
- Clayton, Natalie (January 19, 2021). "Make the cast of TF2 recite old memes with this AI text-to-speech tool". PC Gamer. Archived from the original on January 19, 2021.
- Cocomello, Marco (January 20, 2021). "Make Portal's GLaDOS and Other Characters Say Whatever You Want with This New App". GLITCHED. Archived from the original on March 12, 2025.
- Cowen, Tyler (May 12, 2022). "The most underrated talent in AI?". Marginal Revolution. Archived from the original on May 12, 2022.
- "CNN Newsroom". CNN. January 15, 2021. Archived from the original on August 21, 2025.
- do Prado, Renan (January 19, 2021). "Faça GLaDOS, Bob Esponja e outros personagens falarem textos escritos por você!" [Make GLaDOS, SpongeBob and Other Characters Speak Texts Written by You!]. Arkade (in Brazilian Portuguese). Archived from the original on August 19, 2022.
- Eghosa, Fredrick (June 30, 2025). "I tested the 6 best 15.ai alternatives for AI voiceovers (2025 review)". Techpoint Africa.
- "Can I publish the content I generate on the platform?". ElevenLabs (Official website). 2024b. Archived from the original on December 23, 2024.
- Enriquez, XC (January 16, 2022). "Voice Actor for Joel Receives Backlash after NFT Tweet". ClutchPoints. Archived from the original on March 23, 2025.
- "15.ai已经重新上线，版本更新至v23" [15.ai Back Online, Updated to Version 23]. EquestriaCN (in Chinese). October 1, 2021. Archived from the original on May 19, 2024.
- Ewins, Henry (June 29, 2021). "The AI revolution coming to Skyrim and The Witcher 3's mod scenes". PCGamesN. Archived from the original on January 14, 2025.
- Feng, Bai (March 15, 2020). "模型参数过亿跑不动？看MIT小哥，少量数据完成高质量文本转语音！" [Struggling with Models with Over 100 Million Parameters? See How an MIT Student Achieved High‑Quality Text‑to‑Speech with Minimal Data!]. QQ News (in Chinese). XinZhiYuan. Archived from the original on February 27, 2025.
- Furushima, Takayuki (January 18, 2021). "『Portal』のGLaDOSや『UNDERTALE』のサンズがテキストを読み上げてくれる。文章に込められた感情まで再現することを目指すサービス「15.ai」が話題に" [Portal's GLaDOS and Undertale's Sans Will Read Text for You — AI Service 15.ai Aims to Reproduce Even Emotions in Text, Becomes a Hot Topic]. Denfaminico Gamer (in Japanese). Archived from the original on January 18, 2021.
- "这个网站可用AI生成语音 让ACG角色"说"出你输入的文本" [This Website Can Use AI to Generate Voice, Making ACG Characters "Say" the Text You Input]. GamerSky (in Chinese). January 18, 2021. Archived from the original on December 11, 2024.
- Granger (January 31, 2022). "Трой Бейкер отказался от партнёрства с NFT-платформой Voiceverse и извинился за резкое высказывание в поддержку токенов" [Troy Baker Ends Partnership with NFT Platform Voiceverse and Apologises for Pointed Comments in Support of the NFTs]. DTF (in Russian). Archived from the original on March 23, 2025.
- Groth-Anderson, Magnus (January 19, 2022). "Troy Baker-støttet NFT-virksomhed indrømmer at have stjålet indhold" [Troy Baker‑Backed NFT Company Admits to Stealing Content]. Gamereactor (in Danish). Archived from the original on August 23, 2026.
- "15.ai". Hacker News. June 12, 2022. Archived from the original on April 9, 2023.
- Henry, Joseph (January 18, 2022). "Troy Baker's Partner NFT Company Voiceverse Reportedly Steals Voice Lines From 15.ai". Tech Times. Archived from the original on January 18, 2022.
- Ibáñez, Álvaro (June 15, 2022). "Un algoritmo que convierte texto a voz "con emoción y sentimiento" e imita a personajes y voces conocidas" [Algorithm Converts Text to Speech 'with Emotion and Feeling' and Imitates Well‑Known Characters and Voices]. Microsiervos (in Spanish). Archived from the original on December 12, 2024.
- Ifram, Lauda (January 18, 2022). "Proyek NFT Troy Baker Ketahuan Mencuri Aset Suara AI Tanpa Seizin Pemiliknya" [Troy Baker's NFT Project Caught Stealing AI Voice Assets Without Their Owners' Permission]. Gamebrott (in Indonesian). Archived from the original on May 26, 2022.
- Innes, Ruby (January 18, 2022). "Voiceverse Is The Latest NFT Company Caught Using Someone Else's Content". Kotaku Australia. Archived from the original on July 26, 2024.
- Irpan, Alex (July 21, 2025). "Brony Musicians Seize The Means of Production: My Eyewitness Account to BABSCon 2025". Alex Irpan. Archived from the original on July 30, 2025.
- Ji, Yunyo (January 19, 2021). "这个国外的语音合成网站，可以让玩家操控二次元角色说话" [Overseas Voice Synthesis Site Lets Gamers Make ACG Characters Talk]. 163.com (in Chinese). NetEase News. Archived from the original on February 27, 2025.
- Johansson-Sundelius, Carl (January 18, 2021). "Låt GlaDOS och andra spelkaraktärer hälsa dig god morgon" [Let GLaDOS and Other Game Characters Wish You Good Morning]. FZ (in Swedish). Archived from the original on January 18, 2021.
- Kamen, Matt (January 31, 2022). "Troy Baker ends partnership with NFT company Voiceverse". NME. Archived from the original on June 9, 2024.
- Khibchenko, Pavel (February 15, 2022). "NFT в геймдеве: проблемы регулирования, гнев игроков и поспешные решения разработчиков" [NFTs in gaming: regulatory issues, player anger, and developers' hasty decisions]. Skillbox (in Russian). Archived from the original on June 5, 2023.
- Kuchkanov, Phil (January 15, 2022). ""NFT-штука Троя Бейкера ворует чужие работы". В сети уничтожают известного актера озвучки" ['Troy Baker's NFT Thing Steals Other People's Work.' The Internet Is Destroying the Famous Voice Actor]. GameGuru.ru. Archived from the original on January 15, 2022.
- Kurosawa, Yuki (January 19, 2021). "ゲームキャラ音声読み上げソフト「15.ai」公開中。『Undertale』や『Portal』のキャラに好きなセリフを言ってもらえる" [Game Character Text-to-Speech Tool 15.ai Now Available. Get Characters from Undertale and Portal Say Your Desired Lines]. AUTOMATON (in Japanese). Archived from the original on January 19, 2021.
- Lamorlette, Robin (January 25, 2021). "Insolite : un site permet de faire dire ce que vous souhaitez à GlaDOS (et à d'autres personnages de jeux vidéo)" [Unusual: A Site Lets You Make GLaDOS (and Other Video Game Characters) Say Whatever You Want]. Clubic (in French). Archived from the original on January 19, 2025.
- Lamorlette, Robin (May 9, 2021). "Portal : un fan du jeu a transformé son Alexa en une GLaDOS plus vraie que nature" [Portal: A Fan of the Game Transformed His Alexa into a More Lifelike GLaDOS]. Clubic (in French). Archived from the original on May 9, 2021.
- Lawrence, Briana (January 19, 2022). "Shonen Jump Scare Leads to Company Reassuring Fans That They Aren't Getting Into NFTs". The Mary Sue. Archived from the original on January 13, 2025.
- Li, Yongqiang (January 22, 2021). "语音开源项目优选：免费配音网站15.ai" [Top Open‑Source Voice Project: Free Text‑to‑Speech Site 15.ai]. Zhihu (in Chinese). Archived from the original on December 19, 2024.
- Lopez, Ule (January 16, 2022). "Voiceverse NFT Service Reportedly Uses Stolen Technology from 15ai [UPDATE]". Wccftech. Archived from the original on January 16, 2022.
- MacKinlay, Dan (May 11, 2026). "DIY Generative AI: Community resource and epistemological infrastructure". Dan Mackinlay. Archived from the original on July 30, 2026.
- Mahendra, Parth (May 11, 2020). "Spongebob Can Now Narrate Your Writing". AI Daily. Archived from the original on July 1, 2021.
- Makowiec, Paweł (April 6, 2024). "#CyberMagazyn: Sztuczna inteligencja w służbie filmowców? Lepiej to przemyśleć" [#CyberMagazine: Artificial Intelligence in the Service of Filmmakers? Better Think It Through]. CyberDefence24 (Analysis) (in Polish). Archived from the original on September 5, 2025.
- Moos, Jeanne (January 15, 2021). "Actor applauds editing out Trump's 'Home Alone 2' cameo". CNN. Archived from the original on September 25, 2025.
- Morton, Lauren (January 18, 2021). "Put words in game characters' mouths with this fascinating text to speech tool". Rock, Paper, Shotgun. Archived from the original on January 18, 2021.
- Moto, Eugenio (January 20, 2021). "15.ai, el sitio que te permite usar voces de personajes populares para que digan lo que quieras". Qore (in Spanish). Archived from the original on December 28, 2024.
- MrSun (January 19, 2021). "讓你喜愛的ACG角色說出任何話！ AI生成技術幫助你實現夢想" [Make Your Favorite ACG Characters Say Anything! AI Generation Technology Helps You Realize Your Dreams]. Yahoo! News Taiwan (in Chinese). Archived from the original on December 28, 2024.
- "Troy Bakerin tukema NFT-yhtiö kärähti – Kaupitteli ääninäyttelyä luvatta" [Troy Baker‑Backed NFT Company Exposed – Sold Voice Acting Without Permission]. Muropaketti (in Finnish). January 17, 2022. Archived from the original on May 25, 2022.
- Myrén, Jonny (January 18, 2022). "NFT-företaget som Troy Baker marknadsför tog ljudklipp från annan tjänst" [NFT Company Promoted by Troy Baker Took Audio Clips from Another Service]. FZ (in Swedish). Archived from the original on January 1, 2024.
- Ng, Andrew (April 1, 2020). "Voice Cloning for the Masses". DeepLearning.AI. Archived from the original on December 28, 2024.
- "Navigating the Challenges and Opportunities of Synthetic Voices". OpenAI. March 9, 2024. Archived from the original on November 25, 2024.
- Paltridge, Peter (January 18, 2021). "This Website Will Say Whatever You Type In Spongebob's Voice". Anime Superhero News. Archived from the original on October 17, 2021.
- Parker, Jordan (February 5, 2022). "Like them or not, NFTs are here to stay". The Journal. Webster University. Archived from the original on November 8, 2024.
- Phillips, Tom (January 17, 2022). "Troy Baker-backed NFT firm admits using voice lines taken from another service without permission". Eurogamer. Archived from the original on January 17, 2022.
- Piletsky, Boris (January 15, 2022). "Создателей NFT-голосов, которых поддержал Трой Бейкер, уличили в краже голосов в тот же день" [Creators of Voice NFTs Backed by Troy Baker Caught Stealing Voices The Very Same Day]. iXBT Games. Archived from the original on September 24, 2023.
- "Everything You Need to Know About 15.ai: The AI Voice Generator". Play.ht. September 12, 2024. Archived from the original on December 25, 2024.
- Rosas, Víctor (January 17, 2022). "¡La decepción, hermano! Proyecto NFT apoyado por Troy Baker usó tecnología ajena" [Bro, What a Disappointment! Troy Baker-Backed NFT Project Used Third-Party Technology.]. LevelUp.com (in Spanish). Yahoo! Finance. Archived from the original on February 3, 2022.
- Ruppert, Liana (January 18, 2021). "Make Portal's GLaDOS And Other Beloved Characters Say The Weirdest Things with This App". Game Informer. Archived from the original on January 18, 2021.
- Scotellaro, Shaun (October 5, 2020). "15.ai Adds Tons of New Pony Voices". Equestria Daily. Archived from the original on December 26, 2024.
- Scotellaro, Shaun (September 25, 2020). "New Among Us Animation Goes Viral... With Pony Voices". Equestria Daily. Archived from the original on August 12, 2026.
- Scotellaro, Shaun (March 24, 2020). "Pony Voice Event - What People Forced Ponies to Say!". Equestria Daily. Archived from the original on March 29, 2020.
- Scotellaro, Shaun (November 30, 2021). "The Entire "Story of the Blanks" Played With 15.ai Voices". Equestria Daily. Archived from the original on December 2, 2021.
- Scotellaro, Shaun (May 15, 2022). "Full Simple Animated Episode - The Tax Breaks (Twilight)". Equestria Daily. Archived from the original on August 3, 2026.
- Scotellaro, Shaun (May 19, 2025). "15.ai Returns with Pony Voice Creation as the Focus". Equestria Daily. Archived from the original on August 22, 2025.
- Skorich, Lina (January 15, 2022). "Трою Бейкеру пришлось извиняться за решение сотрудничать с NFT-компанией" [Troy Baker Forced to Apologize for Decision to Partner with NFT Company]. StopGame. Archived from the original on October 2, 2022.
- Sonali, Pednekar (January 14, 2022). Lam, Khoa (ed.). "Incident 277: Voices Created Using Publicly Available App Stolen and Resold as NFT without Attribution". AI Incident Database. Archived from the original on January 13, 2025.
- Staniszewski, Mati (2024). "15.AI: Everything You Need to Know & Best Alternatives". ElevenLabs (Official website). Archived from the original on December 25, 2024.
- Temitope, Yusuf (December 10, 2024). "15.ai Creator reveals journey from MIT Project to internet phenomenon". The Guardian. Archived from the original on December 28, 2024.
- Toh, Brandon (January 18, 2022). "Troy Baker's NFT Partner Company Voiceverse Caught Using Voice Lines From Another Service Without Permission". Geek Culture. Archived from the original on November 30, 2022.
- Tomanová, Amaya (March 27, 2022). "Užitečné weby, které stojí za pozornost: Bezplatné vzdělávání všeho druhu, kreslení s Google Earth a dabing s umělou inteligencí" [Useful Websites Worth Attention: Free Education of All Kinds, Drawing with Google Earth, and Dubbing with Artificial Intelligence]. Letem světem Applem (in Czech). Archived from the original on July 12, 2025.
- Torkington, Nat (May 11, 2020). "Four short links: 11 May 2020". O'Reilly Radar. O'Reilly Media.
- 遊戲, 遊戲角落 (January 20, 2021). "這個AI語音可以模仿《傳送門》GLaDOS講出任何對白！連《Undertale》都可以學" [This AI Voice Can Imitate Portal's GLaDOS Saying Any Dialog! It Can Even Learn Undertale]. United Daily News (in Chinese (Taiwan)). Archived from the original on December 19, 2024.
- Villalobos, José (January 18, 2021). "Descubre 15.AI, un sitio web en el que podrás hacer que GlaDOS diga lo que quieras" [Discover 15.AI, a Website Where You Can Make GlaDOS Say What You Want]. LaPS4 (in Spanish). Archived from the original on January 18, 2021.
- VK, Anirudh (March 18, 2023). "Deepfakes Are Elevating Meme Culture, But At What Cost?". Analytics India Magazine. Archived from the original on December 26, 2024.
- Wakelin-King, Edith (January 15, 2022). "Troy Baker angers the internet with NFT partnership". Checkpoint Gaming. Archived from the original on December 12, 2024.
- Weitzman, Cliff (November 19, 2023). "15.ai: All about 15.ai and the best alternative". Speechify. Archived from the original on December 25, 2024.
- White, Molly (January 14, 2022). "Voice actor Troy Baker announces his involvement in "voice NFT" project Voiceverse with an antagonistic tweet, shortly before it's revealed that the project stole work". Web3 Is Going Just Great. Archived from the original on July 24, 2024.
- Williams, Demi (January 18, 2022). "Voiceverse NFT admits to taking voice lines from non-commercial service". NME. Archived from the original on January 18, 2022.
- Wright, Steve (January 17, 2022). "Troy Baker-backed NFT company admits to using content without permission". Stevivor. Archived from the original on January 17, 2022.
- Wright, Steven (March 21, 2023). "Why Biden, Trump, and Obama Arguing Over Video Games Is YouTube's New Obsession". Inverse. Archived from the original on December 20, 2024.
- Zwiezen, Zack (January 18, 2021). "Website Lets You Make GLaDOS Say Whatever You Want". Kotaku. Archived from the original on January 17, 2021.
- Коэн (January 15, 2022). "Создателей голосовых NFT, поддерживаемых Троем Бейкером, обвинили в воровстве голоса" [Creators of Voice NFTs Backed by Troy Baker Accused of Voice Theft]. Shazoo (in Russian). Archived from the original on January 23, 2022.
