= Voiceverse NFT plagiarism scandal =

2022 NFT plagiarism controversy

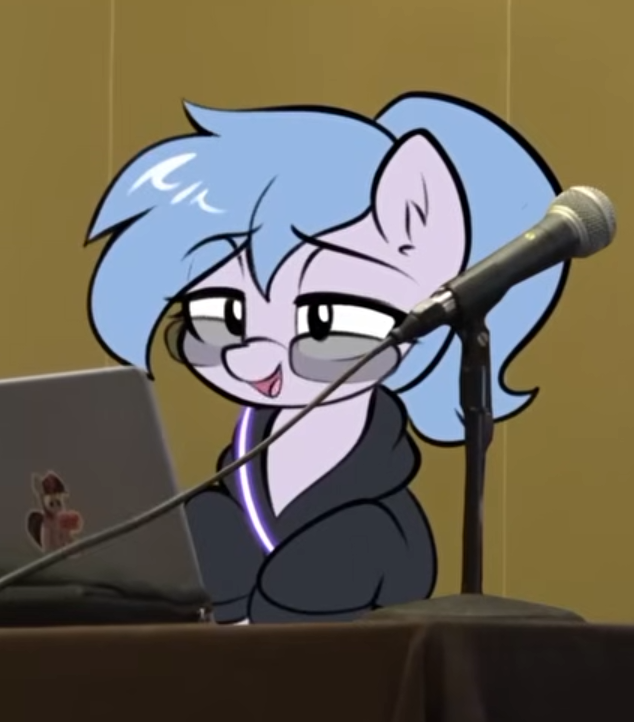
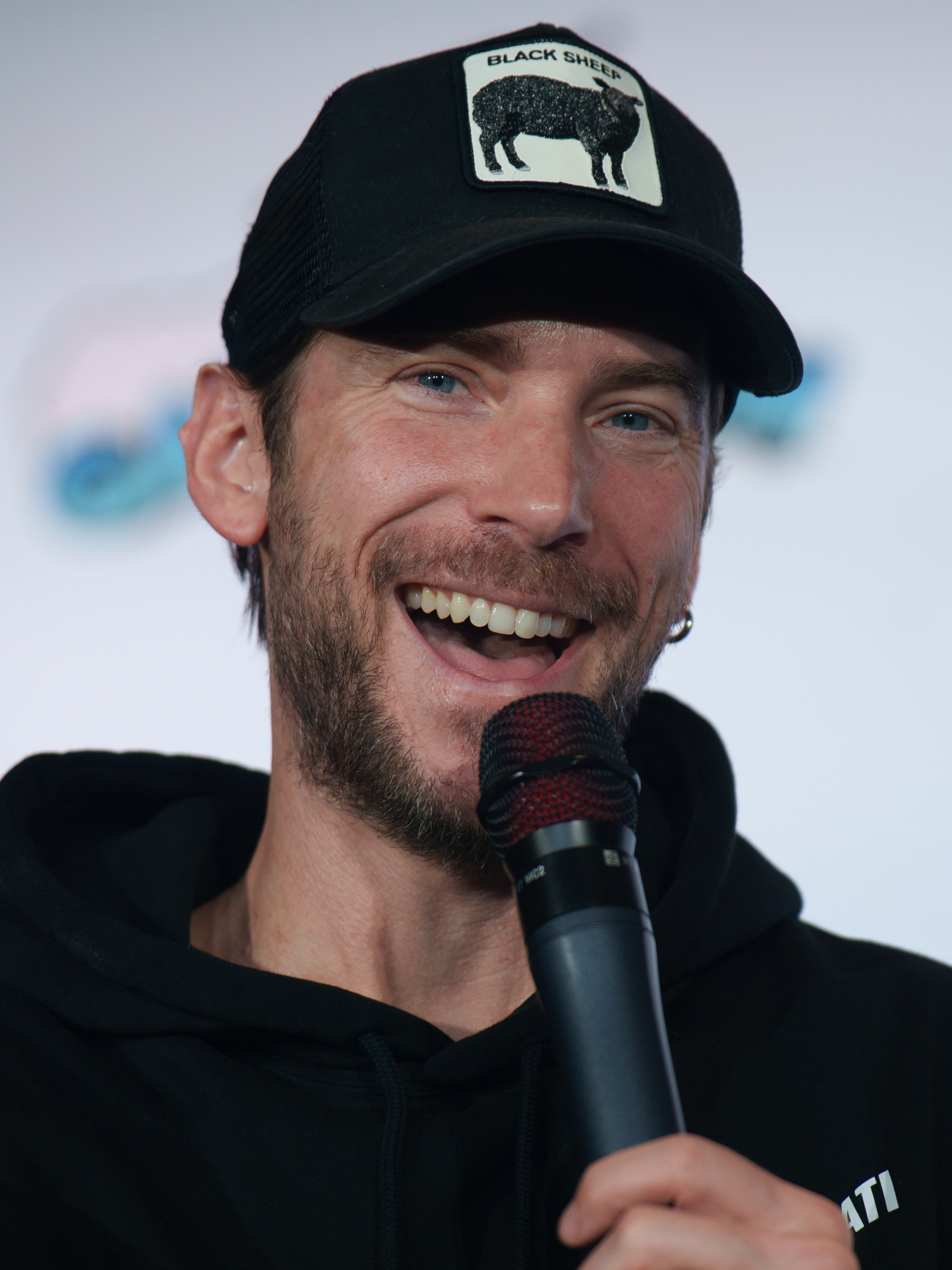
15 (ponysona pictured left) discovered that Voiceverse had used 15.ai to generate voice lines that were used to market Voiceverse's partnership with Troy Baker (right) and subsequently sold as NFTs.

In January 2022, 15—the pseudonymous Massachusetts Institute of Technology (MIT) artificial intelligence researcher and creator of the non-commercial generative artificial intelligence voice synthesis research project 15.ai—discovered that the blockchain-based technology company Voiceverse had plagiarized from their platform. Voiceverse marketed itself as a service that offered AI voice cloning technology that could be purchased and traded as non-fungible tokens (NFTs).

Amid heightened controversy over NFTs in the gaming industry, voice actor Troy Baker (who has been described as one of the most famous voice actors in video games) announced his partnership with Voiceverse on January 14, 2022, triggering immediate backlash over concerns about the environmental impact of NFTs, potential for fraud, predatory monetization in video games, and the potential of AI displacing jobs for human voice actors. Later that same day, 15 revealed through server logs that Voiceverse had generated voice lines using 15.ai, pitch-shifted the audio to make them unrecognizable, and falsely marketed the samples as their own technology before selling them as NFTs. Within an hour of being confronted with evidence, Voiceverse confessed and stated that their marketing team had used 15.ai without proper attribution while rushing to create a technology demo to coincide with Baker's partnership announcement, further exacerbating the already negative reception to the original announcement. In response, 15 replied "Go fuck yourself"; the interaction went viral and garnered a large amount of support for the developer. News publications universally characterized this incident as Voiceverse having stolen from 15.ai.

The next day, Baker appeared on a podcast and stated that his motivation had been to help independent creators who were unable to afford professional voice actors. Following continued backlash and the plagiarism revelation, Baker ended his partnership with Voiceverse on January 31, 2022. Subsequently, the incident was documented in multiple AI ethics databases, criticisms of predatory monetization in video games, and retrospectives as one of the earliest instances of plagiarism and theft stemming from artificial intelligence during the AI boom. After its parent company LOVO, Inc. filed for Chapter 7 bankruptcy, Voiceverse shut down and ceased all operations on May 27, 2026.

== Background ==
=== Troy Baker ===
Troy Baker is a prominent voice actor in the video game industry best known for his performances as Joel Miller in The Last of Us franchise. Baker has been described as "ubiquitous" by Polygon, "one of the most high-profile and prolific voice actors in video games" by Eurogamer, and "arguably the most famous voice actor in the gaming industry" by GameGuru. His other prominent roles include voicing Agent John "Jonesy" Jones in Fortnite, Booker DeWitt in BioShock Infinite, and both Batman and Joker in multiple Batman video games. As of October 2025, Baker holds the record for the most acting nominations at the BAFTA Games Awards, with five between 2013 and 2021.

=== Voiceverse ===
Voiceverse was a blockchain-based startup founded by the Bored Ape Yacht Club that marketed itself as offering AI voice cloning technology in the form of NFTs. Prior to the announcement of their partnership with Baker, Voiceverse had partnered with LOVO, Inc., an AI voice platform that, according to LOVO, could generate human-like voices. Voiceverse stated that any user who purchases a voice NFT would have unlimited and perpetual access to the voice model, which could be used to create content such as audiobooks, YouTube videos, podcasts, e-learning materials, in-game voice chat, and Zoom calls. Voiceverse promised that buyers would "OWN [sic] all of the IP" of content they created using these voices. Voiceverse's roadmap included plans to release 8,888 initial voice NFTs, a feature to add emotions to existing voices, and the ability for users to mint their own voices as NFTs. Prior to Baker's partnership, Voiceverse had also partnered with voice actors Charlet Chung, who voices D.Va in Overwatch, and Andy Milonakis of The Andy Milonakis Show.

=== 15.ai ===
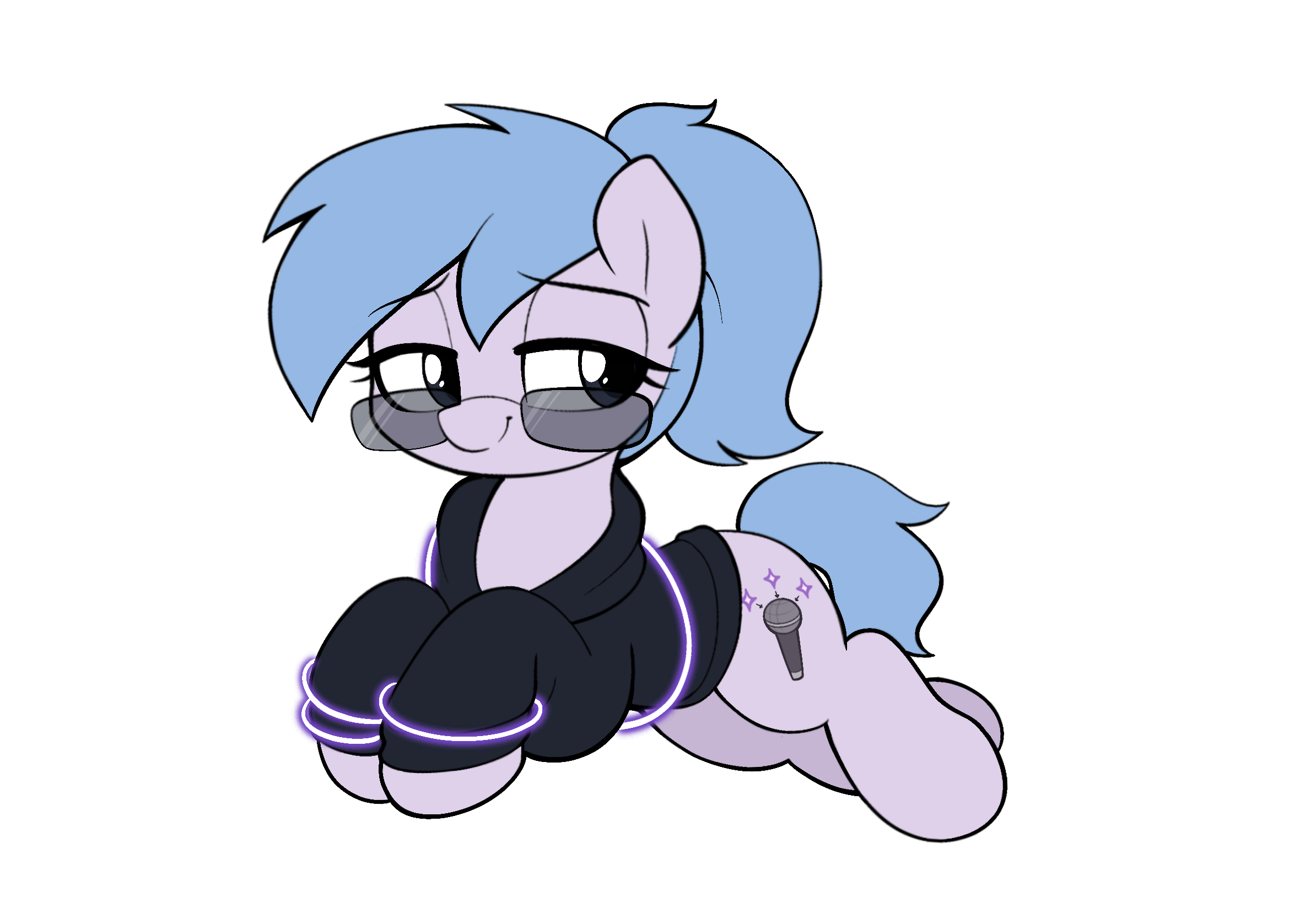
15's ponysona was the mascot of the 15.ai website

15.ai was a free web application launched in 2020 that used artificial intelligence to generate text-to-speech voices of fictional characters from popular media. Created by a pseudonymous artificial intelligence researcher known as 15, who began developing the technology as a freshman during their undergraduate research at MIT, it was an early example of an application of generative artificial intelligence during the initial stages of the AI boom. The platform showed that deep neural networks could generate emotionally expressive speech with only 15 seconds of speech; the name "15.ai" references the creator's statement that a voice can be convincingly cloned with just 15 seconds of audio, as opposed to the tens of hours of data previously required. 15.ai became an Internet phenomenon in early 2021 when content utilizing it went viral on social media and quickly gained widespread use among various Internet fandoms. 15 has emphasized that it remain free and non-commercial; it only requires users to give proper credit when using the service for content creation.

=== NFTs in the video game industry ===
By early 2022, NFTs had become highly controversial within the gaming industry. Critics raised concerns about their environmental impact due to the significant energy consumption of blockchain technology. In addition, the prevalence of scams, fraud, and potential money laundering associated with NFT sales, as well as fears that NFTs were a new form of predatory monetization following the increasing frequency of loot boxes, caused vocal pushback from the gaming community. Several major gaming companies had begun exploring NFT integration into their products, though fan backlash had already forced some projects to be cancelled. On December 16, 2021, the developers of S.T.A.L.K.E.R. 2: Heart of Chernobyl announced that they would be including NFTs in the game, but cancelled within an hour of the announcement due to immediate universal backlash. Voice actors were already struggling for better pay and working conditions, when the rise of AI voice technology brought fears that they would lose jobs and see their work devalued.

== Partnership announcement and backlash ==
Avatar of Troy Baker

Troy Baker
(@TroyBakerVA)
tweeted:

I'm partnering with @VoiceverseNFT to explore ways where together we might bring new tools to new creators to make new things, and allow everyone a chance to own & invest in the IP's they create.

We all have a story to tell.
You can hate.
Or you can create.

What'll it be?

January 14, 2022, 1:02 a.m.

On January 14, 2022, 1:02 a.m. EST, Baker announced on Twitter that he was partnering with Voiceverse "to explore ways where together we might bring new tools to new creators to make new things, and allow everyone a chance to own & invest in the IP's they create." The announcement concluded with the statement "You can hate. Or you can create." Baker's specific role with Voiceverse remained unclear at the time of the announcement.

A Chubbiverse promo video posted by Voiceverse. Server logs later showed that the voices were actually generated using 15.ai and had been distorted to sound unrecognizable.

Along with Baker's announcement, Voiceverse promoted their supposed voice AI technology on Twitter by posting animated videos that featured a cat character created by NFT firm Chubbiverse. The videos concluded with text that read "The Voice Powered By Voiceverse"; Voiceverse stated on Twitter that the voices in the animations had been generated using their own AI voice synthesis technology and presented the videos as a technology demonstration of their voice NFT capabilities.

The announcement provoked immediate and widespread backlash from the gaming community. Baker's tweet received thousands of replies and quote retweets (the vast majority of which were negative), far more than the number of likes; Michael McWhertor of Polygon described it as a "textbook example of being ratioed" and commented that reactions had been amplified by the final part of Baker's announcement. Michael Beckwith of Metro called Baker's approach "bizarrely aggressive".

Later that day, Baker responded to the backlash by apologizing for his choice of words. He said he appreciated people's thoughts and acknowledged that the "hate/create part might have been a bit antagonistic," calling it a "bad attempt to bring levity". Despite the apology, Baker and his fellow voice actors did not distance themselves from Voiceverse at this point. At the same time, Voiceverse attempted to address the criticisms, stating that they were working to move to more environmentally friendly blockchain technology and that voice actors would receive royalties from NFT sales, with actors benefiting from any increase in NFT value.

== Plagiarism revelation ==
{
  "character": "Twilight Sparkle",
  "text": "Hi Frens! We giggle in the Chubbiverse, we eat jpegs and fast foods, then we vomit memes and fart rainbows.",
  "ip": [REDACTED],
  "timestamp": "2022-01-04T02:20:01.651Z"
}
{
  "character": "Rainbow Dash",
  "text": "Hi Frens! i got an alpha drop for you?!? I am made with love and my voice is ai! Yeah for real lets build the chubbiverse - reply below and comment alpha.",
  "ip": [REDACTED],
  "timestamp": "2022-01-04T08:16:16.664Z"
}

An excerpt of the log files that were posted by 15 showing that Voiceverse had used 15.ai to generate voices of Twilight Sparkle and Rainbow Dash, with text matching those spoken in the Chubbiverse promotional video

On December 13, 2021, amidst the increasingly negative reactions toward NFTs among the general public, the creator of 15.ai (known pseudonymously as 15) announced that they had "no interest in incorporating NFTs into any aspect of [their] work."

On January 14, 2022, 11:17 a.m. EST (10 hours after Baker's initial announcement), 15 commented on the Voiceverse venture, stating that it "sounds like a scam". Two hours later, at 1:20 p.m., 15 explicitly accused Voiceverse of "actively attempting to appropriate [15's] work for [Voiceverse's] own benefit." 15 provided evidence through server log files that showed that the voices Voiceverse was claiming credit for had actually been generated by 15.ai. The log files, which showed the details of the server request–responses exactly matching up with those present in Voiceverse's video, proved that Voiceverse had used 15.ai to create the voice samples that they were marketing as their own technology. The Chubbiverse promotion videos featured distorted voices of characters (Note: While sources like Eurogamer and NME mention Rainbow Dash, logs posted by 15 showed that the voice of Twilight Sparkle had also been copied on January 4, 2022.) from the animated television series My Little Pony: Friendship Is Magic. The voice lines had then been sold as NFTs, a violation of 15.ai's terms of service, which explicitly prohibited commercial use and required proper attribution.

Voiceverse
(@VoiceverseNFT)
tweeted:

Hey @fifteenai we are extremely sorry about this. The voice was indeed taken from your platform, which our marketing team used without giving proper credit. Chubbiverse team has no knowledge of this. We will make sure this never happens again.

January 14, 2022, 2:09 p.m.

Voiceverse initially responded sarcastically before deleting that response. At 2:09 p.m. EST, Voiceverse wrote in an apology to 15: "We are extremely sorry about this. The voice was indeed taken from your platform, which our marketing team used without giving proper credit. Chubbiverse team has no knowledge of this. We will make sure this never happens again." In their Discord server, Voiceverse further stated that their marketing team had been in such a rush to create a partnership technology demo that they resorted to using 15.ai without waiting for their own voice technology to be ready.

In response, at 3:34 p.m. EST, 15 tweeted "Go fuck yourself"; the interaction went viral, garnering widespread support for 15. In a subsequent statement, the creator expressed being "extremely depressed" by the incident and wrote: "Not only because my work was stolen and used for profit, but also because of this scandal, the entire field of vocal synthesis is now being misrepresented by charlatans who are only in it for the money." Voiceverse subsequently deleted the incriminating tweet, but Twitter users had already saved and reshared the video.

== Reactions ==
News publications universally characterized the incident as theft. English-language news websites—including Eurogamer, NME, Kotaku Australia, The Mary Sue, The Journal, ClutchPoints, Cracked.com, PlayStation Universe, Geek Culture, TheGeek, Tech Times, We Got This Covered, Stevivor, Checkpoint Gaming, Metro, Kakuchopurei, Wccftech, TweakTown, PlayStation LifeStyle, Destructoid, Know Your Meme, Dot Esports, and Mobidictum—reported that Voiceverse had stolen, (Note: The Mary Sue: "The situation with 15.ai is just one of many stories where creatives talk about their work being stolen and turned into an NFT."; The Journal: "VoiceverseNFT previously admitted to selling voice content stolen from fifteenAI"; PlayStation Universe: "Voiceverse NFT has deleted their original tweets in which they used the stolen lines"; Geek Culture: "Voiceverse has admitted that they stole voice lines without proper credit and permission"; Tech Times: "Troy Baker's Partner NFT Company Voiceverse Reportedly Steals Voice Lines From 15.ai"; Metro: "NFT firm Voiceverse admits it stole work after announcing Troy Baker deal"; Wccftech: "Voiceverse NFT Service Reportedly Uses Stolen Technology from 15ai [UPDATE]"; Kakuchopurei: "Of course, there’s also the other issue of Voiceverse allegedly stealing and profiting off of somebody’s work."; TheGeek: "Voiceverse NFT Uses Stolen Technology!") taken, (Note: Eurogamer: "Troy Baker-backed NFT firm admits using voice lines taken from another service without permission"; NME: "Voiceverse NFT admits to taking voice lines from non-commercial service"; Kotaku Australia: "upon realising that Voiceverse NFT had taken voice lines from the popular text-to-speech service without giving credit") or used 15.ai's work without permission. (Note: Stevivor: "Troy Baker-backed NFT company admits to using content without permission"; Checkpoint Gaming: "It has been discovered that the project has in at least one instance used the work of an existing vocal synthesis creator without their permission."; Mobidictum: "Troy Baker-backed NFT firm admitted using voice lines from another service without permission") Briana Lawrence of The Mary Sue wrote that "15's pinned tweet explicitly states that they have no interest in NFTs, so the theft in this case is a double dose of 'the audacity.'" Ruby Innes of Kotaku Australia called the theft "a case of absolute and unadulterated degenerate behaviour." Brandon Toh of Geek Culture remarked that Voiceverse's actions "seem to run counter to their purported support for content creators as a whole." Russian gaming sites GameGuru, iXBT Games, StopGame, DTF, VGTimes, and Shazoo; Danish gaming magazine Gamereactor; Czech newspaper iDNES; Spanish-language newspaper Sport and gaming news website LevelUp; Portuguese entertainment site OtakuPT; Greek gaming news website GameWorld; Polish gaming website Gry-Online; Indonesian gaming website Gamebrott; Turkish gaming website TurkMMO; French gaming website Mondes Persistants; Hungarian gaming websites GameStar and PC Guru; Swedish gaming website FZ; and Finnish technology website Muropaketti also reported that Voiceverse had stolen, (Note: GameGuru: "А теперь выяснилось, что площадка, с которой он сотрудничает, ворует чужие работы." (transl. "Now, it has been revealed that the platform he collaborates with is stealing other people's work."); iXBT Games: "Создателей NFT-голосов, которых поддержал Трой Бейкер, уличили в краже голосов в тот же день" (transl. "NFT creators backed by Troy Baker were caught stealing votes on the same day."); StopGame: "компанию уличили в воровстве в тот же день, когда актёр объявил о сотрудничестве с производителем аудио-NFT." (transl. "the company was caught stealing on the same day the actor announced his collaboration with an audio NFT producer."); DTF: "На следующий день после того, как Бейкер объявил о работе с Voiceverse, платформу обвинили в воровстве голосов." (transl. "The day after Baker announced his collaboration with Voiceverse, the platform was accused of stealing voices."); VGTimes: "Если кратко, буквально в день анонса коллаборации компанию уличили в воровстве голоса c другой платформы." (transl. "In short, literally on the day of the collaboration's announcement, the company was caught stealing a voice from another platform."); Shazoo: "нам сообщили, что разработчиков платформы поймали на воровстве чужого голоса." (transl. "we've been informed that the platform's developers have been caught stealing someone else's voice."); Gamereactor: "Nu er det hele blevet meget værre for Voiceverse har nu indrømmet, efter en masse beskyldninger, at de har stjålet, og solgt, AI-baseret stemmeskuespil som NFT'er baseret på en stemme opfundet og designet af en tjeneste ved navn 15.ai." (transl. "Now it's all gotten a lot worse because Voiceverse has now admitted, after a lot of accusations, that they have stolen, and sold, AI-based voice acting as NFTs based on a voice invented and designed by a service called 15.ai."); OtakuPT: "Grupo NFT do ator de voz de The Last of Us apanhado a roubar vozes de outro serviço" (transl. "The Last of Us Voice Actor NFT Group Caught Stealing Voices from Another Service"); Gamebrott: "Proyek NFT Troy Baker Ketahuan Mencuri Aset Suara AI Tanpa Seizin Pemiliknya" (transl. "Troy Baker's NFT Project Caught Stealing AI Voice Assets Without Their Owners' Permission")) plagiarized, (Note: FZ: "Voiceverse NFT har erkänt att de tagit rösten utan att hänvisa till upphovsmannen" (transl. "Voiceverse NFT has admitted that they took the voice without attributing it to the creator"); iDNES: "V souvislosti s tím se už ozvali první lidé, kteří upozornili na to, že přímo Voiceverse NFT už ve svých tokenech omylem využil nahrávky, která byla cizím majetkem." (transl. "In this regard, the first people have already spoken out, pointing out that Voiceverse NFT itself has already misrepresented a recording that was someone else's property in its tokens."); LevelUp: "Voiceverse NFT pretendía lucirse con tecnología que no era suya y sin dar crédito" (transl. "Voiceverse NFT intended to show off with technology that was not its own and without giving credit")) or used 15.ai's work without permission. (Note: Sport: "La cosa es que esta IA puede utilizarse de forma grauita y la firma de NFTs ya mencionada estaría intentando sacarle partido al comercializar una muestra y [...] sin el permiso de su autor" (transl. "The thing is that this AI can be used for free and the aforementioned NFT company would be trying to take advantage of it by marketing a sample [...] without the permission of its author."); Muropaketti: "Kaupitteli ääninäyttelyä luvatta" (transl. "selling voice acting without permission"); GameWorld: "Voiceverse, το οποίο δεν έχει τα πνευματικά δικαιώματα" (transl. "Voiceverse, which did not have permission"))

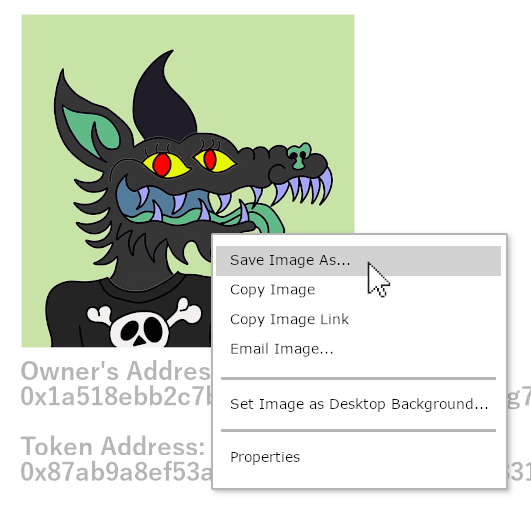
A satirical meme representing the "right-click, save as" criticism of NFTs. Critics of Voiceverse pointed out the irony of selling ownership rights to AI voices when they themselves had stolen 15.ai's technology.

According to Eurogamer, reactions to Baker's initial partnership announcement were universally negative. Critics warned that AI voices could replace human voice actors, devalue their work, and undercut newcomers to the profession. They also raised concerns about the environmental impact of blockchain energy use, as well as scams and art theft associated with NFTs. At the same time, fans also accused Baker of abandoning a 2017 music crowdfunding project and never providing refunds to those who donated.

The plagiarism revelation immediately exacerbated the already-negative reception. Less than an hour after 15's accusation, YouTubers SkillUp and Yong Yea both reported that by plagiarizing 15.ai's work, Voiceverse had committed theft and fraud.

== Aftermath ==
=== Baker's apology and separation ===
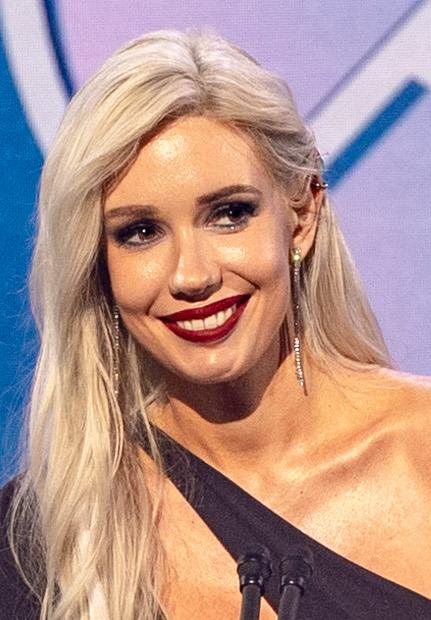
Alanah Pearce

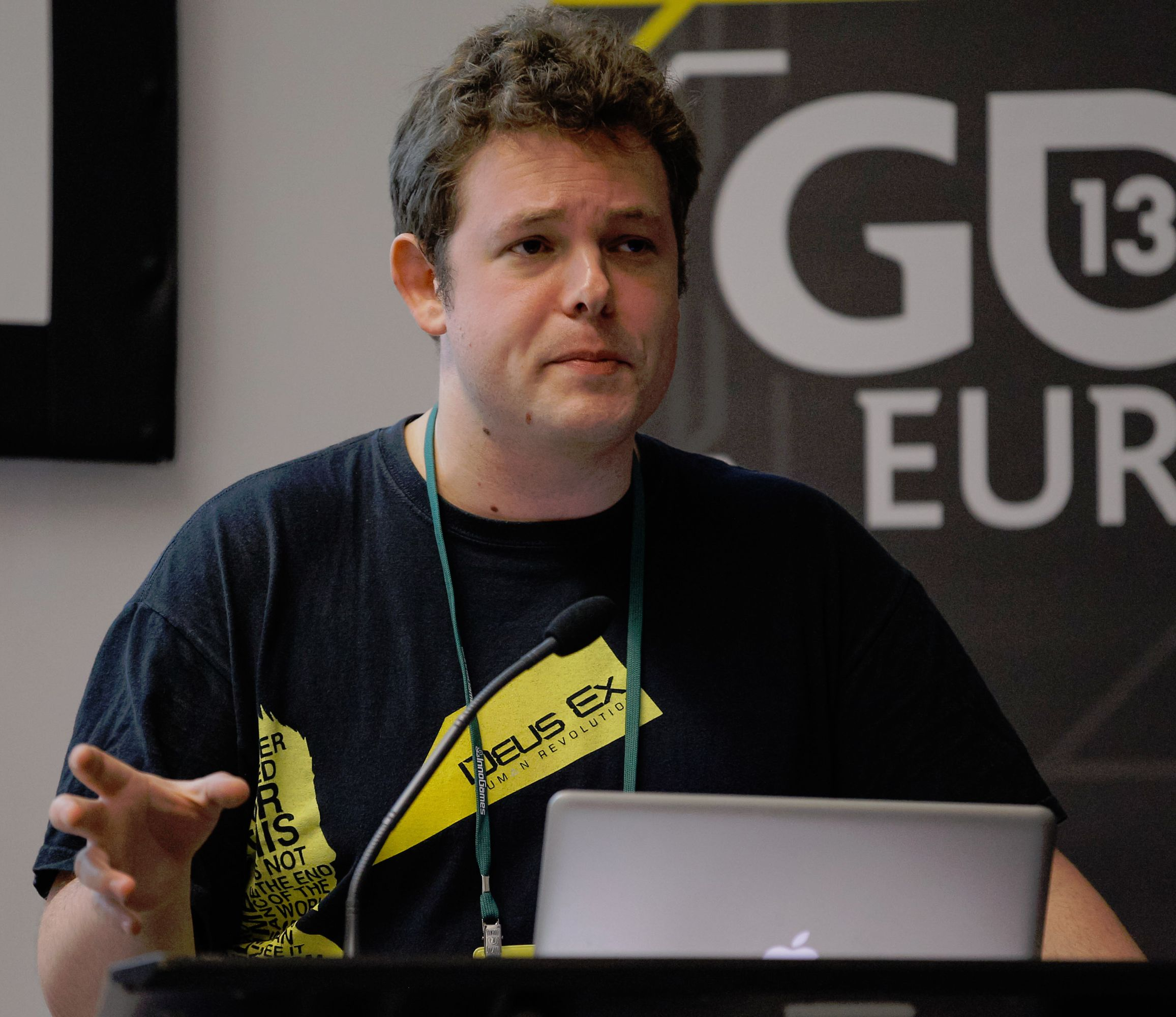
Mike Bithell

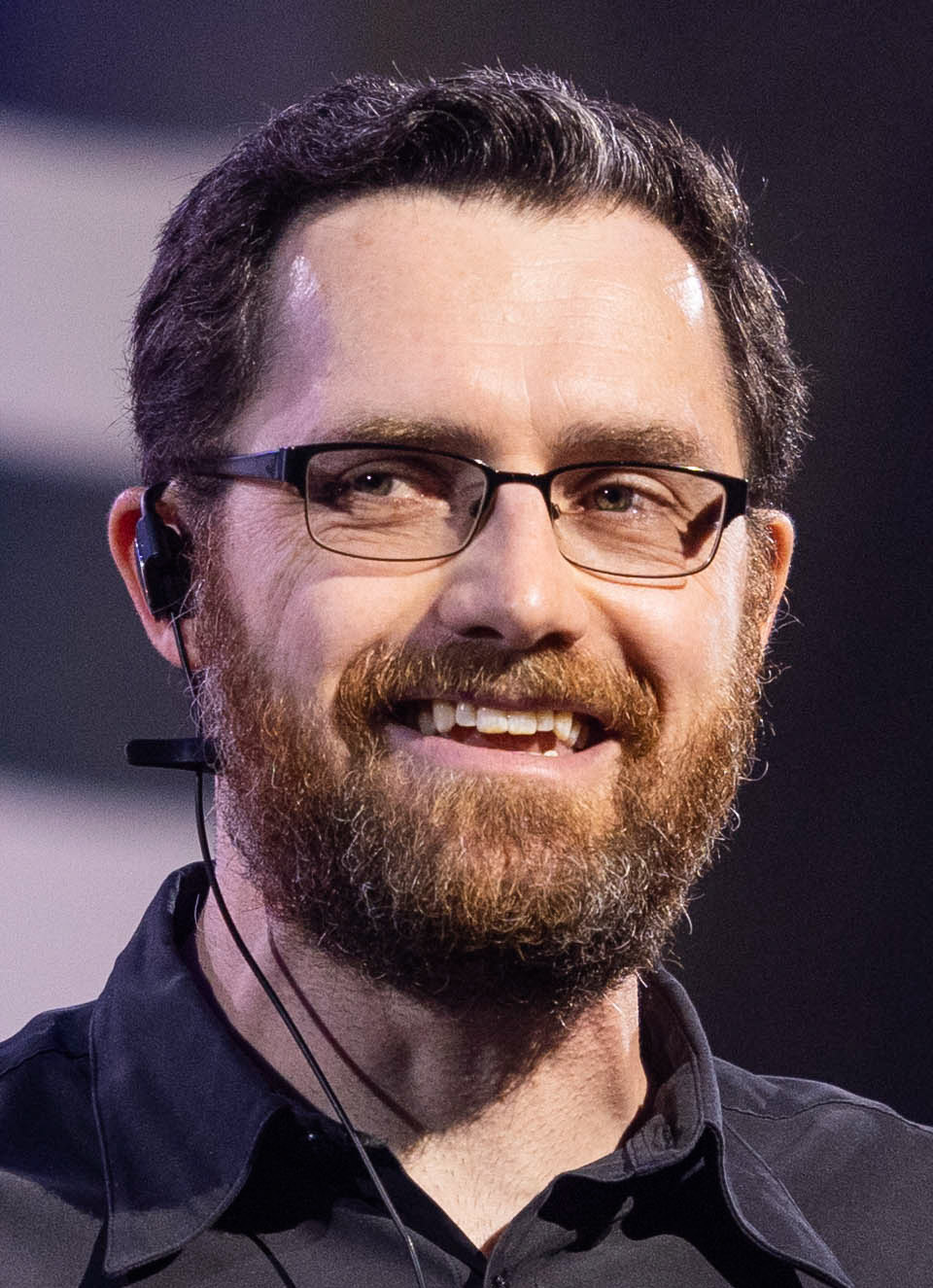
Austin Wintory

On January 15, the day after the plagiarism revelation, Baker appeared on episode 90 of the Play, Watch, Listen podcast, which he co-hosts with Alanah Pearce, Mike Bithell, and Austin Wintory. In the episode, "Talking to Troy Baker About His NFT Tweet," Baker stated that his primary motivation for the partnership was to help independent creators access resources they otherwise could not afford. He said: "while I understood that an NFT was a component to this, that's not what I got involved with." Baker said he envisioned a scenario where "if some independent game maker wants to have me in their game and they can't afford me and they can do that now, great." Responding to concerns that the technology could put voice actors out of work, Baker said: "if the only reason why I don't do something to help somebody out is because it may hurt me, that's a fucked up reason to not do the right thing." He acknowledged that his announcement had been "just a fucking bad look" and apologized again; he also said that he had told Voiceverse he did not know what would happen with the partnership moving forward.

On January 31, over two weeks after his initial announcement, Baker announced that he would no longer partner with Voiceverse and thanked fans for their "feedback and patience". He reiterated his apology from earlier in the month: "Intentions aside, I've heard you and apologize for accusing anyone of 'hating' just by simply disagreeing with me." Voiceverse stated that the decision was reached as a "mutual agreement" between the two parties and stated that they would "double-down our resources and efforts to execute on our roadmap, further our vision as the voice of Web3.0, and strengthen our community as well as the broader NFT ecosystem."

=== Lehrman & Sage v. LOVO, Inc. ===
In April 2021, LOVO, Inc. (the parent company of Voiceverse) had written in their company blog post that "[15.ai] are LOVO's competition because we do all of that as well, but none of us are real threats to each other, yet." On September 25, 2024, a class action lawsuit was filed by voice actors Paul Skye Lehrman and Linnea Sage against LOVO alleging that the company had illegally copied their voices and had used them without permission. Court documents cited LOVO/Voiceverse's prior plagiarism of 15.ai as part of the case. In July 2025, a federal judge in New York dismissed the claims that the artists' voices were subject to federal copyright protection but permitted the claims of breach of contract, unfair business practices, and separate copyright infringement claims regarding unauthorized use of their voices in the AI's training data to proceed.

LOVO, Inc. filed for Chapter 7 bankruptcy on May 27, 2026, ceasing all operations and permanently shutting down Voiceverse.

== Legacy ==
The incident was documented by various organizations indexing ethics violations in artificial intelligence and cryptocurrency. Both the AI Incident Database (AIID) and the AI, Algorithmic, and Automation Incidents and Controversies (AIAAIC) (Note: which are frequently cited and used by researchers, policymakers, and practitioners studying AI-related incidents and their impacts) classified the incident as theft. Later, the AIAAIC also formally classified the incident as a case of plagiarism. The MIT AI Risk Repository catalogued the incident as an example of "economic and cultural devaluation of human effort", and a group of artificial intelligence researchers from Penn State University, Arizona State University, and the University of Dhaka categorized it as an example of platform governance risk of attribution stripping and commercial exploitation.

In a retrospective of the incident on her Web3 Is Going Just Great website, writer and crypto skeptic Molly White wrote that "things were further soured when it was revealed that Voiceverse had stolen work without crediting it from [...] 15.ai." White categorized the incident as theft, a "bad idea", and "shady business". In an article about video game monetization on the Russian educational platform Skillbox, video game journalist Pavel Khibchenko described the plagiarism incident as an example of fraud in NFTs. Both SlashFilm and GameSpot described the incident as plagiarism; Devin Meenan referred to the partnership with Voiceverse as "one of Baker's less reputable roles", writing that "nobody's perfect."

The affair became an exemplar of the gaming community's broader rejection of NFTs. The Verge characterized the backlash with the subheading "His fans chose hate," writing that "not even Troy Baker, one of the most beloved voice actors in gaming, could get away with an NFT project," and multiple news websites—including TheGamer, Digital Trends, Platformer, and PC Gamer—grouped Baker's cancelled partnership alongside other failed gaming NFT projects.

Plagiarism Today's Jonathan Bailey wrote that the incident was one of the earliest instances of "AI plagiariz[ing] AI" and commented that it presaged later AI-related controversies, such as OpenAI's accusations that DeepSeek had "distilled" their models. Bailey distinguished 15's case from corporate disputes, emphasizing that 15 was a solo developer who insisted on non-commercial use and that Voiceverse had directly used the 15.ai service rather than even attempting to distill the model. In January 2026, Eurogamer referenced the scandal in regards to Baker's comments about generative AI, writing that his Voiceverse partnership had resulted in "fierce backlash" as a result of his "provocative marketing". Hyperlific cited the plagiarism episode as an example of how voice-cloning technology could move from research use to commercial products and legal controversy.

== See also ==
- Ponzi scheme
- Video game controversies
- Artificial intelligence controversies
