= FireTune =

- Developer: Totalidea
- Release: 16 March 2005; 21 years ago
- Final release: 1.2 / 23 June 2008; 18 years ago
- Operating system: Windows 98, Windows Me, Windows XP, Windows Vista
- Available in: Multilingual
- Type: tuning plug-in
- License: Freeware
- Website: Archived 17 December 2008 at the Wayback Machine

FireTune was an add-on for Mozilla Firefox from Totalidea introduced in 2005 which aimed at optimizing the speed of the browser. It required minimal technical knowledge with the user selecting a simple profile relating to speed of the computer and its internet connection. The user could also select additional optimizations using a simple tabbed menu. Totalidea discontinued the product from December 2009.

== History ==
FireTune was first introduced in March 2005 at v0.1 and addressed performance issues in Firefox 1 including application startup speed and overall performance issues. While expert users could do the same tuning configurations and optimizations manually this would both impractical and technically difficult for most users. Subsequent releases added additional languages to English and improved the product until v1.0 in April 2005 introduced an improved tabbed graphical interface. Subsequent releases achieved compatibility with ongoing releases of Firefox with the final FireTune v1.2 release in June 2008 being compatible with Firefox v3

Newer versions of Firefox were beginning to natively incorporate features of Firefox and achieve speed improvements.

On 14 December 2009, a month before Firefox 3.6 was announced, Totalidea announced it would no longer distribute or support FireTune. According to the Totalidea website:

"Because the Mozilla Foundation disallows us to show the Firefox logo within our FireTune software, we are no longer able to distribute FireTune, otherwise we would face legal actions initiated by Mozilla. Because of that we have removed the FireTune product from our product catalogue and do no longer offer it for download. Downloads of FireTune from third party websites are out of our control."

Totalidea went on to produce other software including Tweak-SSD, as SSD optimizer for Microsoft Windows.

== Configuration ==
The user was first invited to choose from a list of profiles best describing his/her computer and internet connection configuration, such as "fast computer / fast connection", "slow computer / fast connection", etc. The add-on implemented this by updating the file user.js of Firefox configuration file to match the profile. An option existed to restore the original settings should the changes present any issues. Following the manual profile selection additional optimization settings could be enabled. This was expected to perform the performances of the browser.

== Reception ==
The Clubic reviewer noticed improved performances in a review of FireTune 1.05 in June 2005. A later reviews by Clubic of FireTune 1.2 and against Firefox 3 used nearly identical wording which means it may not be reliable. A review by CNET in June 2009 using FireTune 1.2 against Firefox 3 did not notice any improvement however the CNET reviewer stated that the difference could be noticeable on an older computer or one with a slower internet connection.

Firefox access to the Tor anonymity network had performance issues and use of FireTune was part of one suggestion for alleviating those issues.
