= Gamereactor =

Family of video game magazines

- Gamereactor Magazine, May 2010 issue, featuring John Marston from Red Dead Redemption
- Editor: Magnus Groth-Andersen (Global Editor-in-chief)
- Categories: Video games
- Frequency: Formerly published 8 times a year in Denmark, Germany, Finland, Norway, Sweden and the UK.
- Publisher: Gamez Publishing A/S
- First issue: March 1998; 28 years ago
- Final issue: November 2014; 11 years ago (print magazines)
- Company: Gamereactor
- Country: Denmark, Sweden, Norway, Finland, Germany, Italy, Spain, UK/International, Portugal, France, The Netherlands, China
- Based in: Kongens Lyngby, Copenhagen, Denmark
- Language: Danish, Swedish, Norwegian, Finnish, German, Italian, Spanish, English, Portuguese, French, Dutch, Traditional Chinese
- Website: Gamereactor.dk, Gamereactor.se, Gamereactor.no, Gamereactor.fi, Gamereactor.de, Gamereactor.it, Gamereactor.es, Gamereactor.eu, Gamereactor.pt, Gamereactor.nl, Gamereactor.fr, Gamereactor.cn
- ISSN: 1653-3356

Gamereactor is a Nordic online media network covering video games in multiple languages and a former freesheet magazines network. In 2013, it was "one of the biggest games publications in Europe" according to Develop.

== History ==
The Gamereactor website was started by Egmont Digital in 1998. Also in 1998, brothers Morten Reichel and Claus Reichel launched online and print magazine Gamez.dk in Denmark, which took over the online sites Gamereactor Denmark, Sweden and Norway (.dk/.se/.no) from Egmont in January 2002.

In 2001, they released Gamereactor Magazine in Norway and soon after in Sweden. Since late 2007 Gamereactor has also been available in Finland, and it also launched in Germany (Online only) in 2009. In 2010 they launched in Italy (Online only), and a Portuguese version came online in 2013. Gamereactor later opened outlets in France in November 2016, The Netherlands in January 2017, and China in January 2018.

On 1 September 2008, Gamereactor International was launched, an English edition of the website and the magazine (PDF). It features news, previews and reviews, with a special interest in the Nordic gaming industry, as well as video content from GRTV. The print magazine launched in the UK in 2013, and in 2017 Gamereactor launched a cross-network English language esports sub-site covering competitive gaming.

In November 2014, the print magazines were discontinued. It was free and distributed via game stores and electronics retailers in Denmark, Sweden, Finland, Norway, Germany and the UK. The magazine had eight issues every year (not in January or July), and was published in Danish, Norwegian, Swedish, German, English and Finnish.

In September 2026, the Swedish Gamereactor site was transferred to new management with the editorial team writing a "goodbye" post. Editor Petter Hegevall left Gamereactor and started a new magazine Missil.

=== Editors ===
- Magnus Groth-Andersen - Danish Editor/Global Editor-in-chief
- Petter Hegevall - Swedish Editor/Art Director
- Jonas Mäki - Swedish Editor
- Silje Slette, Eirik Furu - Norwegian Editors
- Markus Hirsilä - Finnish Editor
- Mike Holmes - British/International Editor

== Reception ==
In 2004, Gamereactor Art Director Petter Hegevall was nominated by Sveriges Tidskrifter Swedish Design Awards. In 2013, Gamereactor Magazine (UK) was nominated in the best Print Magazine category at the Games Media Awards, and in 2015 the team were nominated in the Best Editorial Team (Print) category.

In June 2013, the magazine cover contained a The Last of Us artwork that was modified to remove the character Ellie. The editor posted a blog explaining it was a "pure design issue" and that they have previously modified artwork for covers.
