= Molly White =

American Wikipedia editor (born 1993)

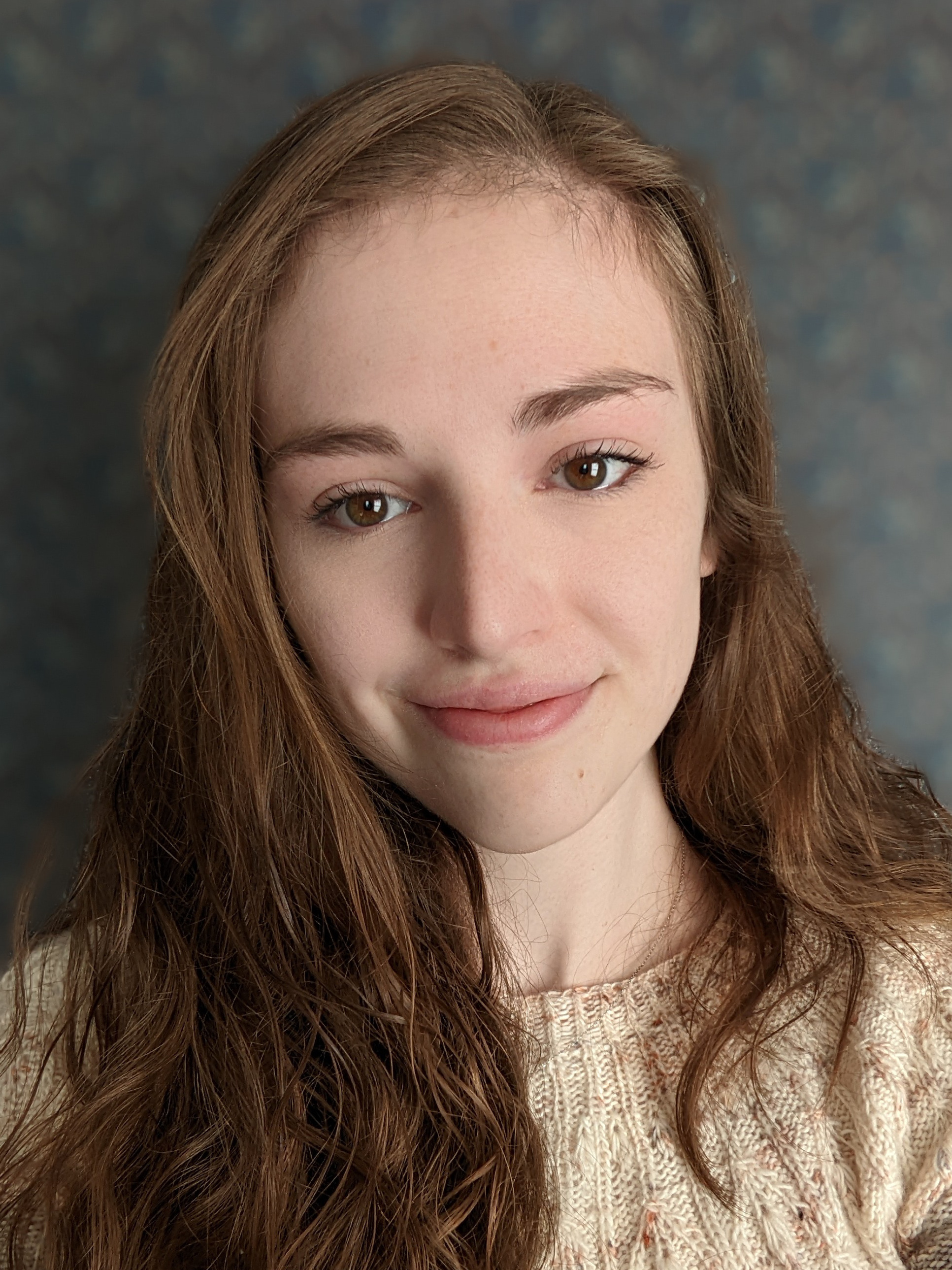
- White in 2022
- Born: Molly Allen White; 1993 (age 32–33)
- Education: Northeastern University
- Occupations: Software engineer, writer
- Known for: Cryptocurrency criticism; Wikipedia editing
- Website: mollywhite.net

Molly Allen White (born 1993) is an American software engineer, crypto skeptic, and Wikipedia editor. A critic of the decentralized blockchain (Web3) and cryptocurrency industries, she runs the website Web3 Is Going Just Great and a newsletter, both of which document wrongdoing in that technology space. White has appeared in Web3-related news and consulted on federal legislation for regulating the crypto industry. White is among Wikipedia's most active women editors. She has contributed to a range of articles in the encyclopedia, particularly on right-wing extremism, and in 2022 successfully proposed that the Wikimedia Foundation cease to collect crypto donations.

== Wikipedia editing ==
White began editing Wikipedia at the age of 13, and became a site administrator while still in high school. Initially, White contributed to articles about her favorite emo bands and women scientists. During the first Donald Trump administration she began contributing to articles about right-wing extremism, such as Gamergate, the Boogaloo movement, Gab, Parler, and Jacob Wohl.

White received mainstream news coverage for her work editing the article about the January 6 United States Capitol attack. Under the username "GorillaWarfare", by early 2022, she had made more than 100,000 edits. She has said that this work fulfills her interest in validating information online and her belief that spreading information produces societal change. She served six years on the English Wikipedia's Arbitration Committee, which adjudicates editor disputes.

White has been a regular target of online harassment, threats of violence, doxxing, and hounding both on Wikipedia and off-site. Her experience was the subject of a 2016 speech on editor harassment by Wikimedia Foundation CEO Katherine Maher. White had previously been targeted after her photograph was featured in a Foundation fundraising campaign. The harassment escalated in 2018 after she began editing Wikipedia articles on incels and other contentious topics.

== Cryptocurrency criticism ==
My overwhelming feeling is that Web3 projects seem to be a solution in search of a problem.

— Molly White, May 2022
White's 2022 presentations on blockchain solutionism and abuse on the blockchain

In late 2021, White noticed a public tone shift around cryptocurrencies with a push to take crypto mainstream as a default technology. This grew her concerns for the suitability of cryptocurrency in general, based on the performance of past projects. She started research by examining a Wikipedia article on Web3, an idea for a Web based on decentralized blockchains. Despite the concept's hype on social media with sizable venture capital investment, she found the term cryptocurrency to be ill-defined and associated with numerous scams, frauds, and "rug pulls" affecting consumer investors. She created a website, Web3 Is Going Just Great, in December 2021 to document these cases. The website provides a timeline of Web3 and cryptocurrency projects and the losses to their investors, which are added to the site's 'grift counter' which reached $12 billion in May 2023. Many of the site's stories are not covered in the mainstream press, and, unlike press coverage of Web3, its headlines are unsensational. The Verge described her writing as "dryly funny, almost clinical" in its documentation. A running total of dollars lost to crypto failures runs in the website's corner. The site also includes a glossary of jargon, curated resources about the blockchain, and an annotated critique of Kevin Roose's New York Times article, "The Latecomer's Guide to Crypto", which she considered a "grossly irresponsible" advertisement for cryptocurrencies. Traffic to the website grew quickly after it was listed on Hacker News, Reddit, and multiple news publications, growing to between 60,000 and 100,000 monthly visitors by the end of 2022. During this time, she worked for several hours a day on the blog. White also covers crypto, policy, and trending technology in her newsletter Citation Needed.

By mid-2022, White was known among the most prominent and knowledgeable critics of the crypto and Web3 industries. On those topics, White lectured at Stanford University, counseled U.S. Senator Sheldon Whitehouse on legislation, and provided fact checks for inquiring journalists. According to The Information, her appearances on Web3-related news sites, podcasts, and technology mailing lists garnered her identification as, an "unofficial Web3 ombudsperson". She has a large following among cryptocurrency skeptics and, in late 2022, was recognized among both Forbes's "30 Under 30" people in Social Media and Prospect's list of the world's top thinkers.

White's Twitter thread on flaws in the proposed cryptocurrency project Cryptoland went viral and led to large-scale ridicule of the now-inactive project. In early 2022, she proposed that the Wikimedia Foundation cease accepting cryptocurrency donations, which she argued were associated with predatory technologies and no longer were ethical. Following a community vote with majority support among participating Wikipedia editors, the Foundation adopted her proposal in May 2022.

She sees privacy and harassment implications with having an individual's entire transaction history permanently available and accessible to the public via blockchain, and has been surprised by how few companies consider vectors for abuse. According to White, "any time you're talking about taking user-generated content and putting it into immutable storage, you're going to have really serious problems." She holds that crypto has not democratized the web but has exacerbated inequalities, stating that Web3 technologies have re-centralized power under the control of a few wealthy investors, many of whom, according to White, are already very influential in shaping the current web tech landscape. She also says that positive use cases for the technology have largely consisted of situations in which "any replacement is better than what exists", such as sending funds to people struggling to live in sanctioned states.

White has called for federal regulation of the crypto industry. She signed a June 2022 letter to the U.S. Congress with 25 other technologists urging regulation. The letter states, in part, that blockchain technology is "poorly suited for just about every purpose currently touted as a present or potential source of public benefit". White opposed a cryptocurrency regulatory proposal by Senators Kirsten Gillibrand and Cynthia Lummis for its leniency on the industry. She argued cryptocurrencies are treated as consumer investments, more like a security than a commodity, and should be handled by the U.S. Securities and Exchange Commission, not the Commodity Futures Trading Commission.

At a March 2023 SXSW talk, White claimed that the tech industry's shift to artificial intelligence displayed a similar pattern of hype and uncritical media coverage as happened with blockchain technology.

In her assessment of the October 10, 2025, flash crash liquidation event, White said the meltdown serves as a reminder of "just how quickly crypto markets can unravel when an abrupt shock pierces the euphoria", predicting that "As crypto grows more interconnected with mainstream finance, future crashes will reach far more widely."

== Tracking political influence of the tech industry ==
In 2024, White's project Follow the Crypto tracked political donations from the crypto industry. White and advocacy group Public Citizen filed a campaign finance complaint with the Federal Election Commission against Coinbase in August 2024, alleging that a $25 million donation to a super PAC was in violation of laws affecting federal contractors.

In June 2026, White launched Tech Influence Watch, an expansion of her previous project which tracked political spending by the crypto industry, and now includes a look at how AI super PACs are influencing elections. In a post announcing the new coverage, White said that there is an overlap in the strategists behind the two campaigns, and pointed out that "The PACs may look different from the outside, but they're increasingly the same operation with aligned goals: deregulate the tech sector, slash consumer protections, and allow tech companies to capture even more enormous profits at the expense of everyday people."

== Personal life and career ==
White was born in 1993 and raised in Maine. While attending Camden Hills Regional High School in Rockport, White interned at a NASA-funded University of Maine lab that researched lunar habitat module sensors. She attended Boston's Northeastern University, where she participated in two co-ops with the marketing software developer HubSpot. After graduation with a bachelor's degree in computer science in 2016, she continued to work at the company as a software engineer for six years, through May 2022, when she resigned to recover from burnout. As of late 2022, she is an affiliate of the Berkman Klein Center for Internet & Society at Harvard University.

White lives in the Greater Boston area. She holds left-wing views that skew toward socialism.

== See also ==
- Cryptocurrency bubble – Speculative bubble involving cryptocurrency prices
- David Gerard (author) – Australian Wikipedian and cryptocurrency skeptic
- List of Wikipedia people
