= Clubic =

Website

- Screenshot of Clubic as of 5 April 2009
- Website type: News
- Available in: French
- Owner: Clubic SAS
- Website: www.clubic.com
- Commercial: Yes
- Registration: optional
- Launched: 2000
- Current status: Online

Clubic is a French web site, which was owned by M6 Web until March 2018, and is independent from 2018 to January 2026.

Created in 2000, this webzine about computing and multimedia offers news, reviews and downloads of software applications, as well as community services. The web site integrates articles written by other web sites edited by Cyréalis such as JeuxVideo.fr, Mobinautes or NetEco. Cyréalis was bought by M6 in 2008. The editorial policy of Clubic is voluntarily geared towards the general public in order to reach a wide audience.

According to Alexa, as of 5 April 2009, Clubic is the 1,433 most visited website in the world, and the 79th in France. It has 4.3 million unique visitors each month, with 88 millions of pageviews per month.

In January 2026, Groupe EBRA via its subsidiary Humanoid acquires Clubic.
