= CryptoPunks =

Non-fungible token on Ethereum

- Six examples of the 10,000 randomly generated CryptoPunks
- Designer: John Watkinson and Matt Hall
- Year: 2017
- Medium: Generative art, NFT
- Location: Ethereum
- Owner: Various
- Website: https://www.cryptopunks.app/

CryptoPunks is a non-fungible token (NFT) collection on the Ethereum blockchain. The project was launched in June 2017 by the Larva Labs studio, a two-person team consisting of Canadian software developers Matt Hall and John Watkinson. The experimental project was inspired by the London punk scenes, the cyberpunk movement, and electronic music artists Daft Punk. The crypto art blockchain project was an inspiration for the ERC-721 standard for NFTs and the modern crypto art movement, which has since become a part of the cryptocurrency and decentralized finance ecosystems on multiple blockchains.

== Concept ==
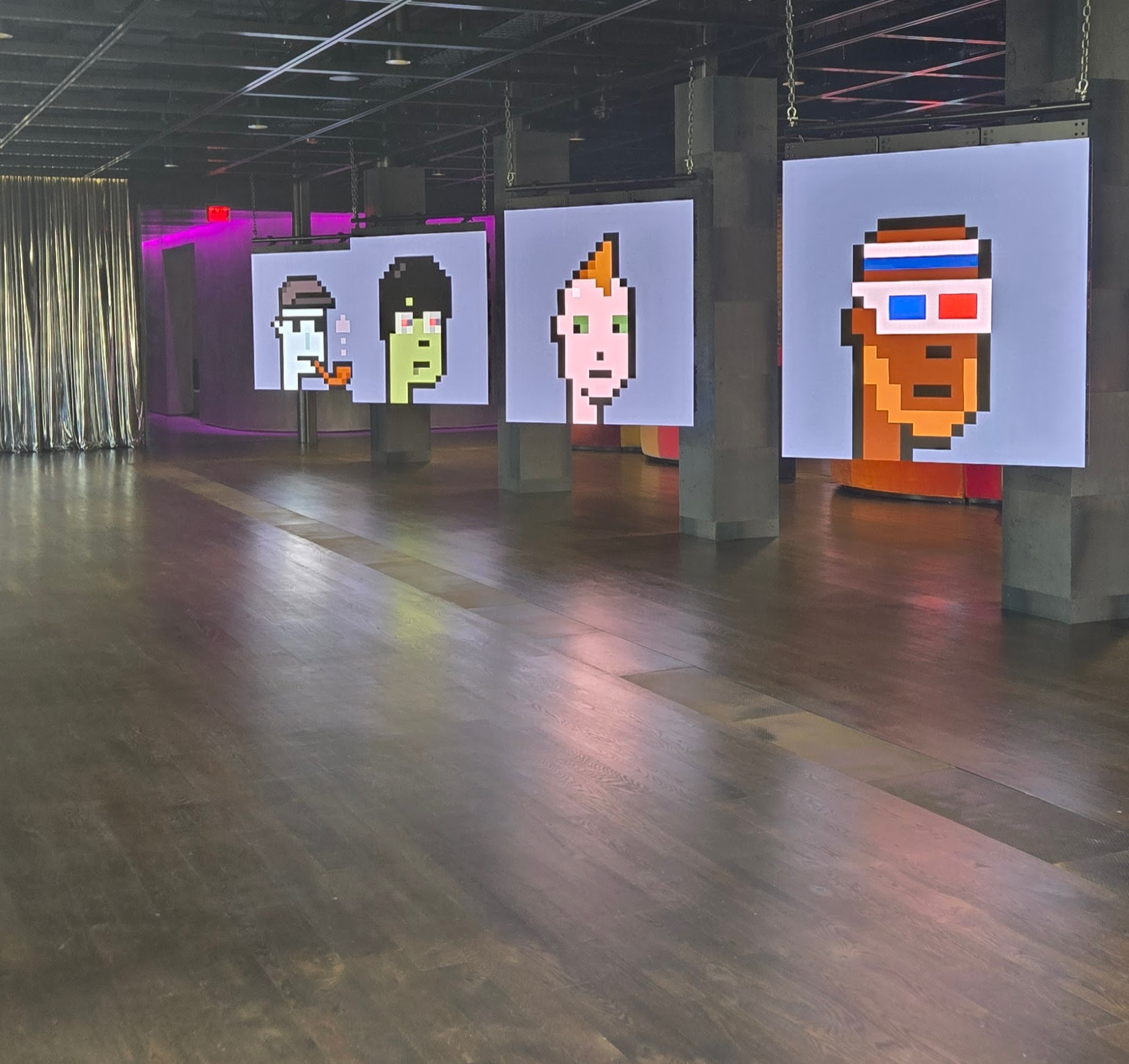
Several CryptoPunks on display at the NODE Foundation's gallery in Palo Alto, CA

There are 10,000 unique CryptoPunks. Each one was algorithmically generated through computer code and thus no two characters are exactly alike, with some traits being rarer than others. They were originally released for free and could be claimed by anyone with an Ethereum wallet by paying only "gas fees", which were low at the time.

Most of the 10,000 CryptoPunks represent humans (6,039 male and 3,840 female), but there are also three special types: Zombie (88), Ape (24), and Alien (9).

CryptoPunks are commonly credited with starting the NFT craze of 2021, along with other early projects such as CryptoKitties, Bored Ape Yacht Club, and the sale of Beeple's Everydays: The First 5000 Days. There are 10,000 CryptoPunk tokens total. On March 2, 2022, an anonymous user donated CryptoPunk #5364 to Ukraine's government Ethereum wallet public address to help fund the Ukrainian government against the Russian invasion of Ukraine.

== History ==
In October 2021, a single NFT transaction was made for 124,457 Ether (US$532 million at the time of the sale) regarding CryptoPunk #9998, much higher than all previous NFT sales, leading to speculation on social media that this could have been some kind of scam, a security exploit or money laundering. Larva Labs said that the purchase was made with a flash loan where the NFT's owner bought the item from themselves with borrowed money, taking out and repaying the loan within a single blockchain transaction, subsequently invalidating the sale from the asset's historic and from all the related statistics.

In early 2022, a Sotheby's auction for a single lot of 104 CryptoPunks was announced. The auction took place on 23 February 2022, but its seller (0x650d) changed their mind 23 minutes after the auction began and decided to withdraw the auction to keep the whole lot.

On March 11, 2022, it was announced that all of the CryptoPunks IP was acquired by Yuga Labs (parent company and creators of the Bored Ape Yacht Club project) for an undisclosed sum. Immediately, Yuga Labs announced they were giving full commercial rights to CryptoPunks owners. On May 7, 2022, the transfer was completed, and the whole CryptoPunks marketplace was moved to the new Yuga Labs–owned website.

In May 2025, Yuga Labs sold the intellectual property of CryptoPunks to the nonprofit NODE Foundation, an organization focused on the preservation of digital art. The financial details of the transaction were not disclosed, and representatives declined to comment. NODE had previously received a $25 million grant in April 2025 from investor Micky Malka and Becky Kleiner to support its mission of "building the future of digital art." Malka, who serves as the foundation’s chair, stated that CryptoPunks "sparked a cultural movement" and emphasized the foundation’s intention to "future-proof this landmark work" and make it more accessible.

In September 2025, OpenSea announced plans to spend more than $1 million building a "Flagship Collection" of NFTs, which began with the acquisition of a CryptoPunk.

In December 2025, Museum of Modern Art (MoMA) added 10 CryptoPunks to its permanent collection alongside works from the Chromie Squiggles series.

== See also ==
- Rare Pepe
- EtherRock
- Bored Ape
- List of most expensive non-fungible tokens
- Ethereum
