= Dangiuz =

Contemporary Italian artist

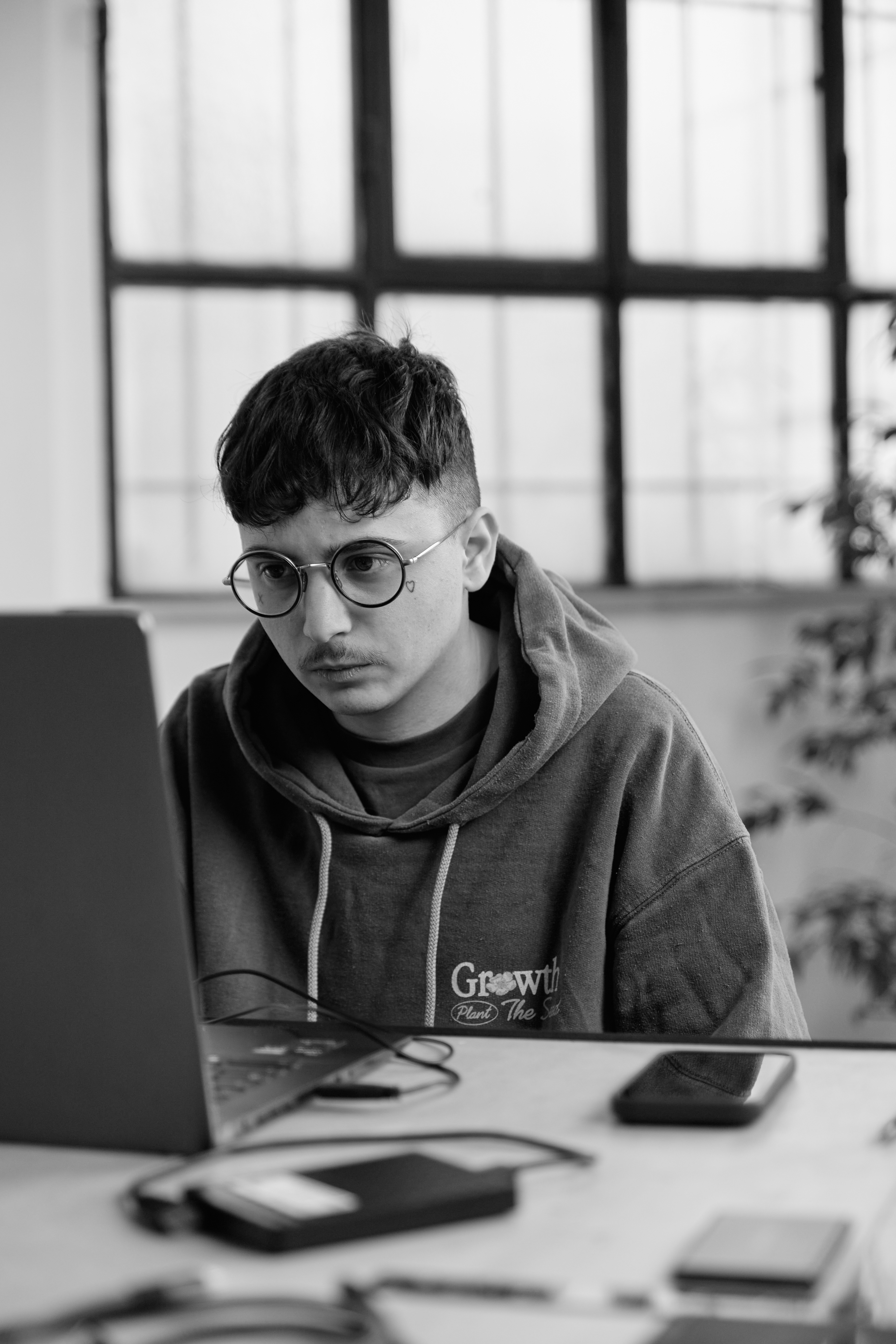
- Dangiuz in 2023.
- Born: Leopoldo D'Angelo; July 11, 1995 (age 31); Turin, Italy
- Occupation: Visual artist
- Years active: 2014–present
- Known for: Digital Art, NFTs
- Style: Cyberpunk, Sci-Fi

Leopoldo D'Angelo (born 11 July 1995 in Turin, Italy), better known by the pseudonym "Dangiuz" (pronounced [ˈdandʒuts]) is an Italian contemporary visual artist, digital artist and art director specializing in sci-fi themes. His work has been featured in art networks, books, TV channels and magazines such as RAI, Arte, Wallpaper*, NVIDIA Studio Standouts, Juxtapoz Magazine, Sohu, Pixiv and Digital Production, and showcased in various museums and galleries worldwide. He also took part in the creation of Rui Hachimura's Cherry Blossom kimono design and Maserati's MC20 concept art.

== Style and influence ==
Described as "Romantic Cyberpunk", his work, artistic style and concepts fall under the Sci-Fi and Cyberpunk categories, and his figure is often linked to digital art, 3D design, Sci-Fi/Cyberpunk genres in cinema and NFTs, sometimes in controversial terms. Produced with 3D computer graphics software, his work is interpreted as a critique of modern society, authoritarian algocracies and the escalating dominance of technology, depicting dystopian scenarios with references and hints to Blade Runner and The Matrix, from which the artist stated he draws inspiration. He mentions Syd Mead and Beeple as the contemporary artists who influenced the most during his formative years. The presence of a black cat in nearly all of Dangiuz's work has become a key signature and recurring element. Often referred to as an easter egg, the "Dangiuz Cat" has become a symbol associated with Dangiuz's artistic identity.

== Career ==
In February 2021, "Grand Challenge", one of D'Angelo's artworks, was one of the first fully digital artworks sold as a non-fungible token by an Italian digital artist. In March 2021, upon digital art and NFTs gaining popularity due to Beeple's Everydays: the First 5000 Days sale, D'Angelo rose to prominence together with other digital artists, establishing himself in the following months as one of the most prolific digital artists selling single edition artworks (1/1s) as NFTs on the digital art platform SuperRare, along with other popular digital artists such as XCOPY and Pak. In June 2022 he took part in a charity auction at Christie's, with all the proceeds being donated to MAPS. The NFT of his artwork "Enchanter" was auctioned and sold, realizing a price of $44,100, making it the 10th most expensive NFT digital artwork of 2022 sold at a great auction house. In January 2023 Dangiuz stood out for releasing "A Breath of Fresh Air", an Open Edition NFT artwork that was collected 9152 times, making it the fourth highest grossing Open Edition ever and the second highest of 2023. Between December 2023 and January 2024 his artworks "La Siesta" and "Carnival Plaza", previously owned by 3AC, were auctioned at Sotheby's and sold: the former for an undisclosed amount, the latter for $21,540. On 31 December 2025 D'Angelo announced The Oathkeepers, a long-term conceptual art project centered on the durational exploration of authorship and blockchain; for the remainder of his life, the artist has committed to provide single edition collectors with a new artwork each year, on the last day of the year.

== Selected Art exhibitions and galleries ==
- Maxon Cinema 4D official gallery, digital, 2019
- “Heart of Cyberpunk” exhibition in Hong Kong, 2020
- “Invisible Cities” exhibition, digital, 2021
- ”NFTNYC” exhibition in Times Square, New York City, 2021
- “Lugano NFT Week” exhibition at Villa Ciani in Lugano, 2021
- “DART2121” exhibition at Museo della Permanente in Milan, 2021
- “CryptoArtFair UAE” exhibition at Abu Dhabi National Exhibition Centre in Abu Dhabi, 2021
- “Milano Art Week 2022” exhibition in Milan, 2022
- Vanity Fair's "MetaVanity", digital, 2022
- SuperRare Gallery in SoHo, New York City, 2022
- "Plastic Future Exhibition" at Mecenate Fine Art Gallery in Rome, Italy, 2023
- "Dystopia: Societas Futura" exhibition at Art Dubai in Dubai, 2024
- "Before It's Gone" exhibition at the Art Blocks Marfa Weekend in Marfa, 2026
