= List of most expensive non-fungible tokens =

This is a list of the highest known prices possibly paid for non-fungible tokens (NFTs) representing digital assets.

== Background ==
From late 2017, the NFT market grew quickly. In the first three months of 2021, NFTs worth US$200 million were traded. One of the earliest NFT projects, CryptoPunks, has provided several of the most expensive NFTs.

Some of the most significant purchases are attributed to decentralized autonomous organizations (DAOs), horizontal blockchain funds with a single publicly traded wallet.

== List ==
This list is ordered by consumer price index inflation-adjusted value (in bold) in millions of United States dollars in 2025. (Note: The Wikipedia template uses a yearly average inflation. Using monthly averages gives slightly different numbers, most significantly for paintings sold early or late in a year with significant inflation.) Where necessary, the price is first converted to dollars using the exchange rate at the time the NFT was sold. The inflation adjustment may change, as recent inflation rates are often revised. A list in another currency may be in a slightly different order due to exchange-rate fluctuations. NFTs are listed only once, i.e. for the highest price sold. To maintain a manageable size, only NFTs that were sold for an adjusted price of $2 million and above are listed.

Prices are recorded as they were initially achieved; most of the listed NFTs are basically worthless as of 2024.

The identity of some parties is not publicly known. Online handles and other pseudonyms are recorded in quotations.

Adjusted price (millions of US$)	Actual price paid (millions of US$)	Asset	Year of creation	Date of sale	Seller	Buyer	Blockchain	Notes
$86.3 M	$69.3 M	Everydays: the First 5000 Days	2021	March 11, 2021	Beeple	Vignesh "Metakovan" Sundaresan	Ethereum	First purely NFT artwork to be offered by a major auction house, Christie's.
$62.6 M	$52.8 M	Clock	2022	February 9, 2022	Pak	AssangeDAO	Ethereum	Depicts a counter of the number of days Julian Assange has spent in prison. The most expensive NFT sold on-chain.
$36.1 M	$28.985 M	HUMAN ONE	2021	November 9, 2021	Beeple	Ryan Zurrer	Ethereum	A kinetic video sculpture with a corresponding dynamic NFT. Sold at Christie's
$28.2 M	$23.7 M	CryptoPunk #5822	2017	February 12, 2022	Anonymous	"deepak"	Ethereum	Released by Larva Labs. First bought for $1,641.
$14.6 M	$11.75 M	CryptoPunk #7523	2017	June 10, 2021	"Sillytuna"	Anonymous	Ethereum	Released by Larva Labs. Sold by Sotheby's.
$9.5 M	$7.67 M	CryptoPunk #3100	2017	March 11, 2021	Anonymous	Anonymous	Ethereum	Released by Larva Labs.
$9.4 M	$7.6 M	CryptoPunk #7804	2017	March 10, 2021	Anonymous	Anonymous	Ethereum	Released by Larva Labs.
$8.2 M	$6.60 M	Beeple's CROSSROAD	2021	February 25, 2021	Pablo Rodriguez-Fraile	"Delphina Leucas"	Ethereum	Resold from the October 2020 price of $66,666.60.
$7.5 M	$6.0 M	OCEAN FRONT	2021	March 22, 2021	Beeple	Justin Sun	Ethereum	Auctioned on Niftygateway.
$7 M	$5.59 M	CryptoPunk #5217	2017	July 30, 2021	"Snowfro"	Anonymous	Ethereum	Released by Larva Labs.
$7.4 M	$6.215 M	Dmitri Cherniak's Ringers #879	2021	June 15, 2023	Sotheby's	"punk6529"	Ethereum	2nd highest sale of generative art at the time. Work is nicknamed "The Goose" due to its emergent design resembling the animal.
$6.7 M	$5.40 M	Stay Free	2021	April 16, 2021	Edward Snowden	PleasrDAO	Ethereum	First NFT by Snowden on behalf of the Freedom of Press Foundation.
$6.5 M	$5.23 M	Save Thousands of Lives	2021	May 8, 2021	Noora Health	Paul Graham	Ethereum	Sold for 1,337 ETH in charity auction.
$5.5 M	$4.40 M	Doge	2021	June 12, 2021	Atsuko Sato	PleasrDAO	Ethereum	Highest selling meme NFT. 1,696.69 ETH.
$5.4 M	$4.37 M	CryptoPunk #2338	2017	August 6, 2021	Anonymous	Anonymous	Ethereum	Released by Larva Labs. One of 88 Zombie Cryptopunks.
$5.2 M	$4.14 M	REPLICATOR	2021	April 23, 2021	Mad Dog Jones	Anonymous	Ethereum	First NFT auction by Phillips.
$4.7 M	$3.765 M	EtherRock #55	2021	October 25, 2021	Anonymous	Anonymous	Ethereum	Via fractional.art.
$3.6	$3.6	PEPENOPOULOS, 2016	2016	October 26, 2021	Anonymous	Anonymous	Bitcoin	Rare Pepe sold by Sotheby's in first auction on its Metaverse platform for NFT collectors.
$3.4	$3.4	BAYC #8817	2021	October 26, 2021	Anonymous	Anonymous	Ethereum	Bored Ape Yacht Club collection launched in 2021 with 10,000 works.
$4.1 M	$3.3 M	Fidenza #313	2021	August 23, 2021	Anonymous	Anonymous	Ethereum	Minted on Art Blocks. A generative art NFT by Tyler Hobbs.
$2.9	$2.9	First tweet by Twitter CEO	2006	March 22, 2021	Jack Dorsey	Sina Estavi	Ethereum	Sold for 1,630.5 ETH. Dorsey donated the proceeds to GiveDirectly.
$2.7	$2.6	BAYC #8585	2021	October 19, 2021	Anonymous	Anonymous	Ethereum	Sold for 696.969.
$2.7	$2.7	Dmitri Cherniak's Self Portrait #1, 2020	2020	October 26, 2021	Anonymous	Anonymous	Ethereum	"This generative self-portrait is the most important work in Cherniak's career." Sold on Sotheby's Metaverse platform.
$3 M	$2.382 M	Machine Hallucinations – Space : Metaverse	2021	October 4, 2021	Refik Anadol	Anonymous	Ethereum	8 works sold for a combined total of HK$39.39m (US$5.06m) at Sotheby's in Hong Kong.
$2.5 M	$2.043 M	Dreaming at Dusk	2021	March 14, 2021	Torproject	PleasrDAO	Ethereum	Sold for 500 ETH on Foundation.
$2.5 M	$2.035 M	MetaRift	2021	March 15, 2021	Pak	Danny "seedphrase" Maegaard	Ethereum	Sold for 489 ETH on MakersPlace.
$2.5 M	$2.0 M	SMB #1355	2021	October 1, 2021	Anonymous	Anonymous	Solana	Highest sale on Solana. 13,027 SOL.

== See also ==
- List of most expensive artworks by living artists
- List of most expensive paintings
- List of most expensive photographs
- List of most expensive sculptures
- List of most expensive books and manuscripts
