= FEWOCiOUS =

American digital artist, painter, and sculptor

Victor Langlois
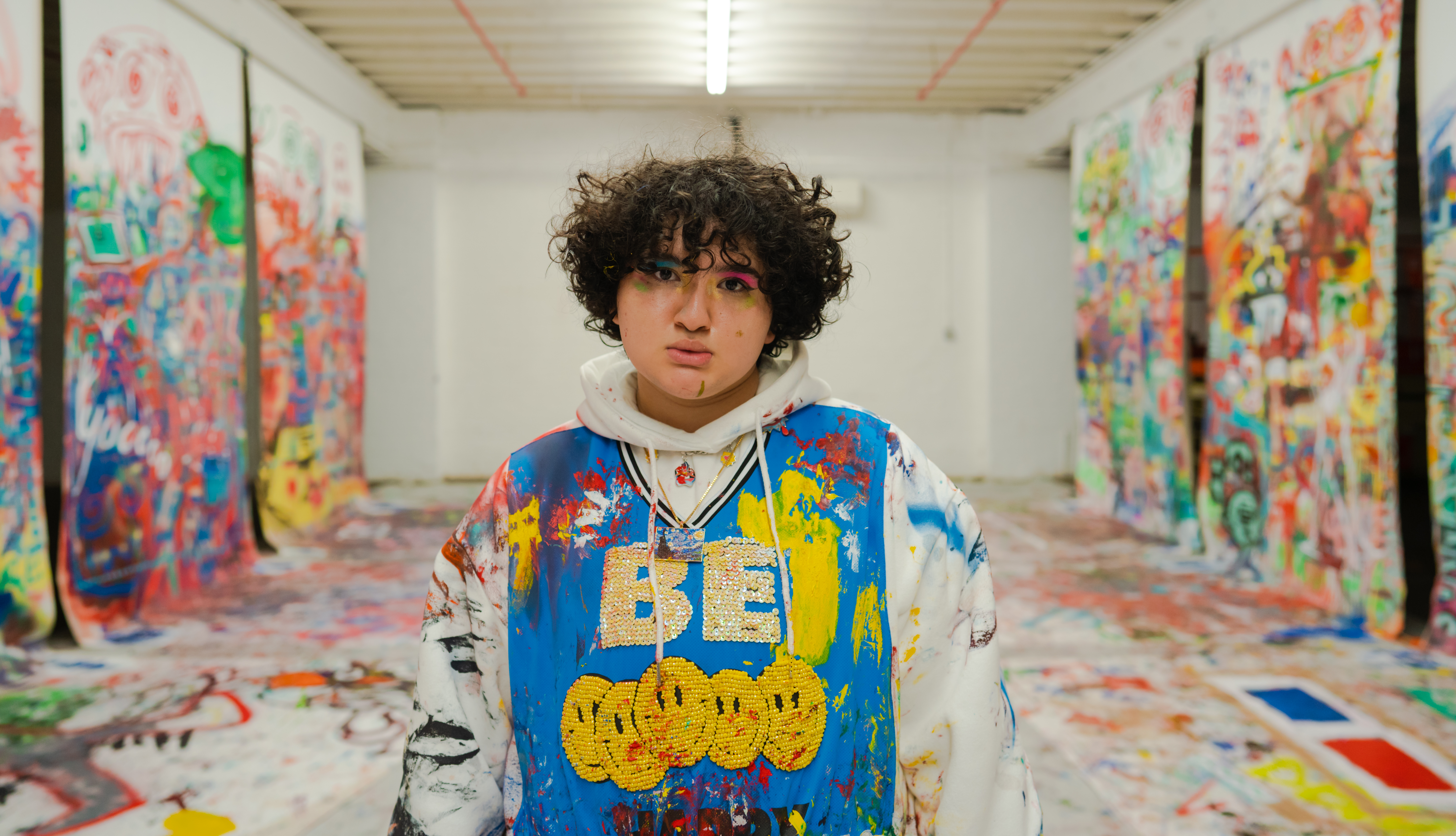
- Born: January 1, 2003 (age 23)
- Other names: FEWOCiOUS
- Occupation: Artist
- Years active: 2020 - present
- Known for: Digital art, NFT art, painting, sculpture
- Website: fewocious.com

Victor Langlois (born January 1, 2003), known professionally as FEWOCiOUS, is an American digital artist, painter, and sculptor known for his NFT artwork.

== Early life ==
Langlois grew up in Las Vegas, Nevada. He began creating art at the age of 13. He moved to Seattle, Washington in 2021.

== Career ==
In March 2020, FEWOCiOUS sold his first painting to a New York art collector. FEWOCiOUS eventually gained a following after selling his artwork on the online platforms SuperRare and Nifty Gateway.

FEWOCiOUS collaborated with his friends and fellow artists parrot_ism, odious, and Jonathan Wolfe on the collection Fabricated Fairytales, which was released in early 2021. In 2021, FEWOCiOUS also collaborated with the Nike subsidiary RTFKT on an NFT sneaker collection titled “FEWO WORLD Open Edition,” which included a real pair of sneakers with the purchase of each unique NFT. The collection of sneakers sold over $3.1 million in seven minutes.

In June 2021, the New York branch of the auction house Christie's arranged an auction for FEWOCiOUS's work Hello, i'm Victor (FEWOCiOUS) and This Is My Life, which was sold for $2.16 million. As a result of the auction, he was featured in a segment for the ABC News program Nightline. At the time of the sale, FEWOCiOUS was the youngest artist to have a solo sale at Christie's.

In April 2022, FEWOCiOUS sold his Paint Drop NFT collection through Nifty Gateway for $20 million. The collection was part of his generative art project FewoWorld.

In June 2022, FEWOCiOUS redesigned the logo and cover of Billboard magazine for its annual Pride Issue. In the same month, FEWOCiOUS organized one of series of events called FewoWorld Paint Party in Brooklyn’s Greenpoint neighborhood for the fourth annual NFT.NYC Week.

The following month, FEWOCiOUS collaborated with Billboard again on an exclusive NFT drop, which consisted of a full issue of Billboard magazine as part of his FewoWorld project.

FEWOCiOUS was one of the artists that collaborated with the David Bowie Estate on the multiple artist NFT collection Bowie on the Blockchain, which was released in September 2022.

FEWOCiOUS sold the NFT piece Nice to meet you, I'm Mr. MiSUNDERSTOOD through the auction house Sothesby's for $2.8 million in October 2022.

FEWOCiOUS had his second auction at Christie's in November 2022, during which he did a live painting on stage inside a clear acrylic box.

== Personal life ==
Langlois is transgender.
