= Bored & Hungry =

2022–2024 fast food restaurant in Long Beach

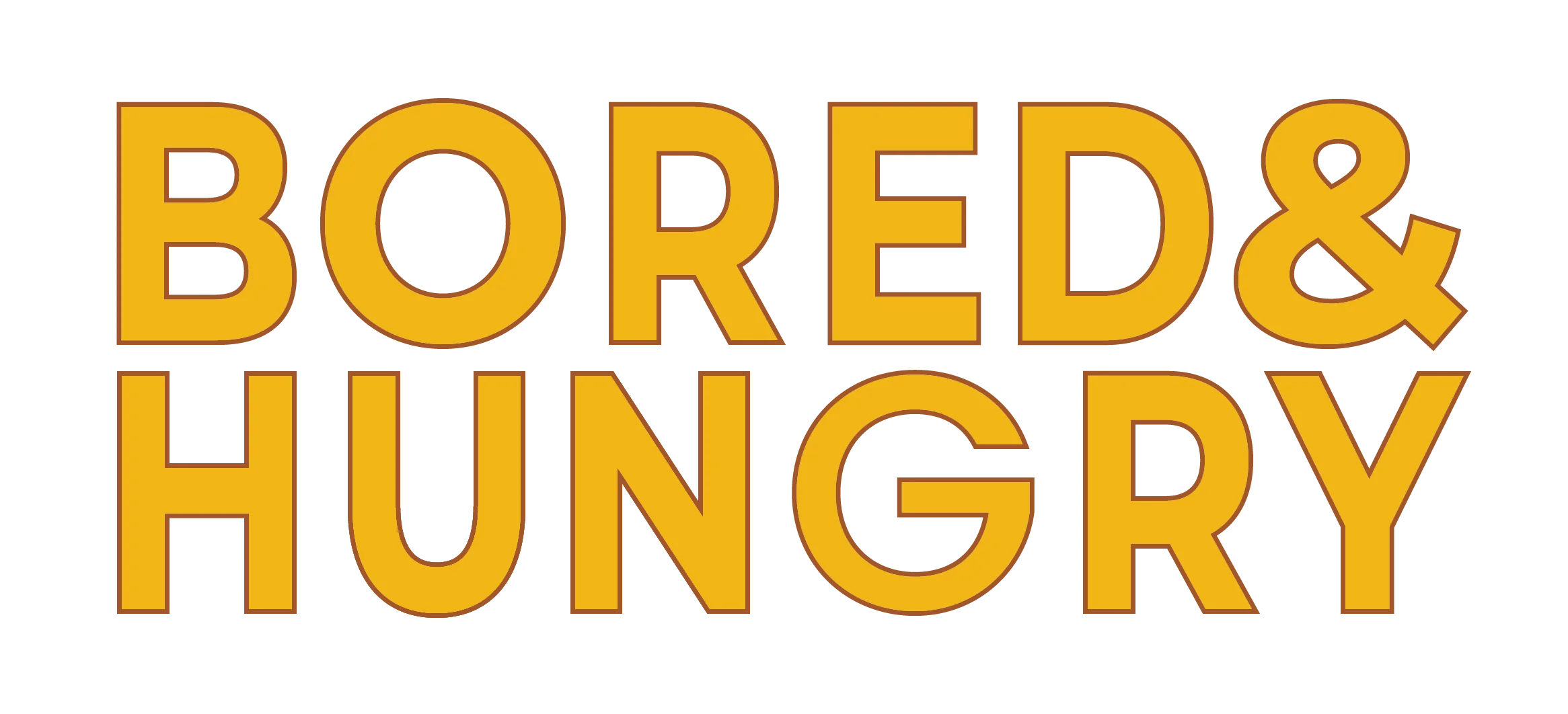

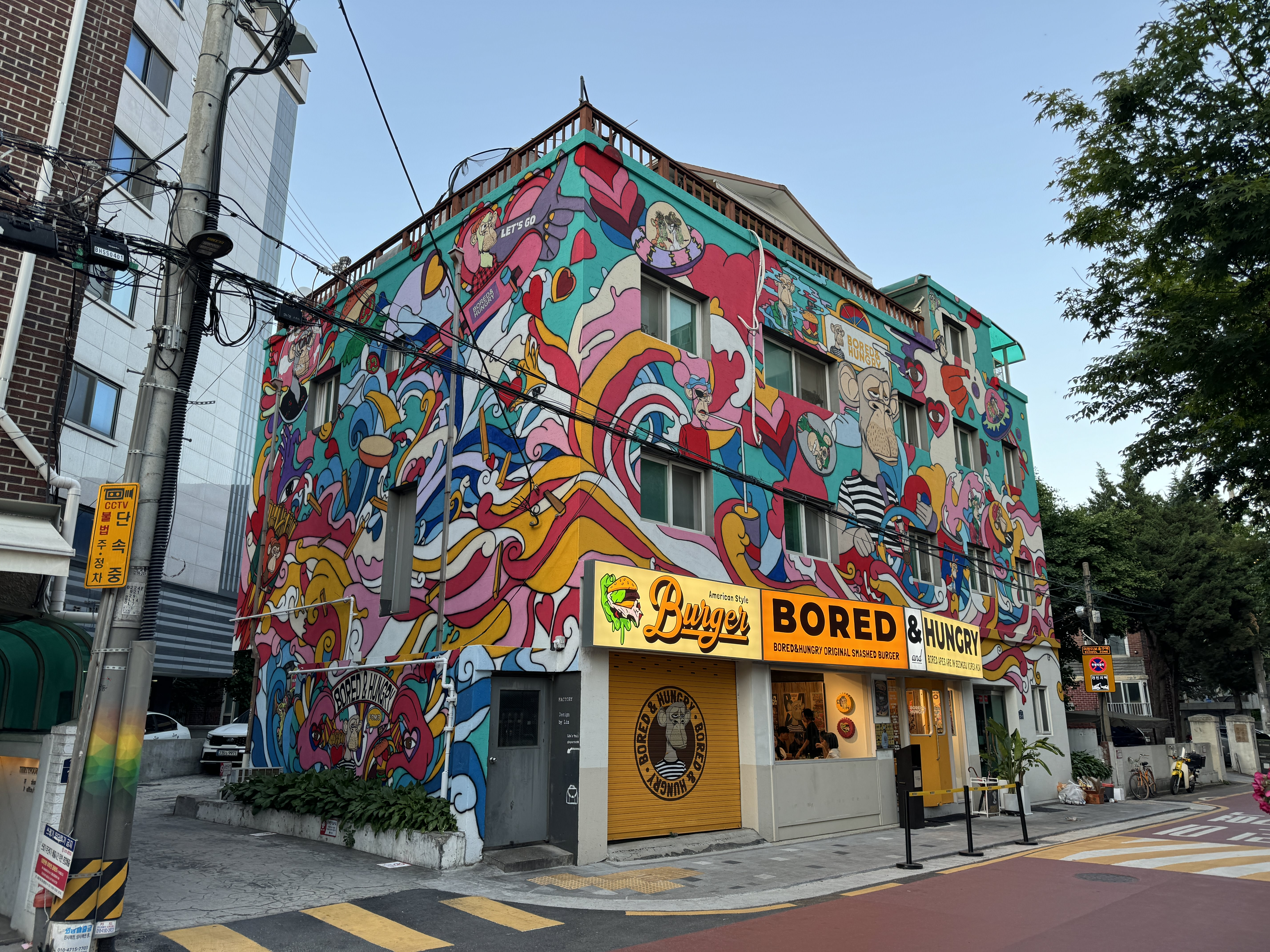
- Interactive map of Bored & Hungry

Restaurant information
- Established: April 9, 2022
- Closed: April 8, 2024
- Owner: Andy Nguyen
- Food type: Fast food restaurant
- Location: 2405 East 7th St, Long Beach, California, 90804, United States
- Coordinates: 33°46′32.5884″N 118°9′47.127″W
- Website: justboredandhungry.com

Bored & Hungry is a cryptocurrency-themed fast food restaurant in Long Beach, California that existed from 2022 to 2024. It was the first concept from Food Fighters Universe, the world's first NFT restaurant group owned by restaurateur Andy Nguyen. The restaurant was marketed around the Bored Ape Yacht Club, a series of non-fungible tokens, and payment was initially accepted in both United States dollars and cryptocurrency. While the original restaurant closed in 2024, franchise operations exist in other countries.

== History ==
Bored & Hungry was owned by Andy Nguyen. In March 2022, Nguyen purchased three non-fungible tokens (NFTs) from the Bored Ape Yacht Club: Bored Ape #6184 and three Mutant Apes. Doing so gave him the intellectual property ownership rights of the four NFTs, as well as access to an online community of other Bored Ape owners. Bored Ape #6184, which became the restaurant's logo, cost Nguyen $267,000, while the mutant apes cost an additional $65,000 to $75,000 each.

Bored & Hungry opened on April 9, 2022, attracting over 1,500 customers for its opening. Originally planned as a 90-day pop-up restaurant, the success that Bored & Hungry had upon opening led Nguyen to make the restaurant permanent. Following the 2022 cryptocurrency crash, the Los Angeles Times reported on June 24 that Bored & Hungry was only accepting payment in United States dollars. On April 8, 2024, Nguyen announced that Bored & Hungry's original Long Beach location would close.

== Operations ==
Bored & Hungry was located at 2405 E 7th St. in Long Beach, California. It occupied a 1,700 square foot (160 m^{2}) space that formerly belonged to a fried chicken restaurant and was almost replaced by a vegan burger location. It had a small menu consisting of smash burgers, veggie burgers, French fries, and soda. The signature menu item was the Trill Burger, a type of smashburger with multiple beef patties, caramelized onions, and a special sauce. Customers could optionally purchase food through the cryptocurrencies ApeCoin and Ethereum.

As of 2024, Bored & Hungry has permanent and pop-up stores in the Philippines and South Korea, with plans to open up new stores in Malaysia and China.
