= Certificate of authenticity =

Seal placed on objects (physical or digital) to show they are genuine

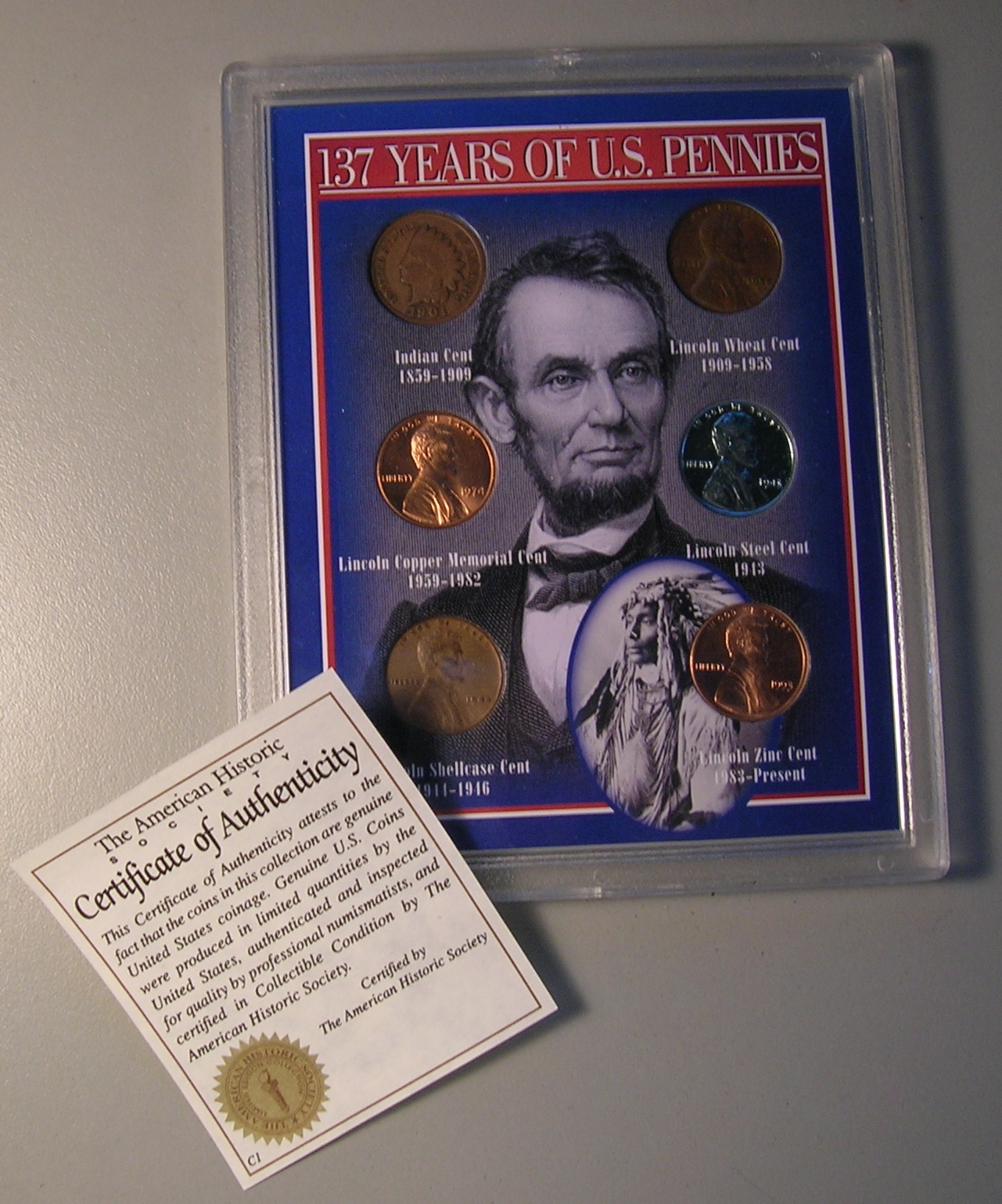
A certificate of authenticity with a coin set.

A certificate of authenticity (COA) is a seal or small sticker on a proprietary computer program, t-shirt, jersey, or other memorabilia or art work, especially in the world of computers and sports. It is commonly a seal on paper authenticating a specific artwork made to prove authenticity.

== Information included ==
Depending on the item being authenticated, the certificate of authenticity may include:

- The name of the product oritem
- The date of creation
- A serial number
- The name or signature of the creator

The document is usually supplied by the manufacturer, artist or other approved entity.

== COAs for software ==
Computer COAs have a license number on them, which verifies the program to be a genuine, legal copy.

== COAs for art ==
COAs are common in art. Artwork or posters come with a COA signed and sealed by a reputable appraiser or auction house. Generally, a valid artwork COA includes when and how the piece was produced, the names of people or companies involved in the artwork's production, the work's exact title, the dimensions of the art, and the names of reference books, magazines, or similar resources that contain specific or related information about the art or artist. The COA states the qualifications of the individual or entity that authored the certificate with their contact information.

COAs have been a target of controversy due to online auction sites where sellers provide fake COAs to market or sell their art works.

== COAs in auctions ==
COAs are commonly used on internet auction sites to provide "proof" the signature on an item is genuine. However, it is widely acknowledged that most of these COAs have been produced by fraudulent sellers to encourage buyers to buy fake items. In almost all cases, these COAs are worthless and have no traceability.

== Importance of COAs ==
COAs prove the legitimacy of an item, thereby informing consumers about its origin. They are often used in auctions or private sales to confirm authenticity and can be used as marketing tools. COAs establish that an item is genuine and untampered, hence valuable. Items like artwork, rare coins, collectibles and luxury goods often gain value when accompanied by a COA.

== Legal aspects of COAs ==
=== United Kingdom ===
COAs are of no value unless it contains full contact details of the issuer. In the UK, it is an offense under the Fraud Act 2006 (section 7) to create or use a COA in the sale of an autograph or similar item: "(1) A person is guilty of an offence if he makes, adapts, supplies or offers to supply any article (a) knowing that it is designed or adapted for use in the course of or in connection with fraud, or (b) intending it to be used to commit, or assist in the commission of, fraud."

In other words, if the seller is offering fakes with a COA, they are committing more than one offense, and the offense of issuing a COA is a possible 12-month prison sentence.

== NFTs as digital certificates of authenticity ==
Non-fungible tokens (NFTs) have emerged as a digital analogue to traditional certificates of authenticity, particularly in the realm of digital art and collectibles. An NFT is a unique digital token, typically on a blockchain like Ethereum, which certifies ownership and authenticity of a digital asset. Each NFT contains metadata that can include the creator's identity, the asset's creation date, and other details, similar to a physical COA. This technology has gained prominence as a means of asserting originality and ownership of digital artworks and other unique digital items.

=== Characteristics and application ===
NFTs differ from traditional COAs in several ways:

1. Digital verification: Unlike physical COAs, NFTs provide a digital means of verification, making them well-suited for digital assets.
2. Blockchain technology: NFTs are built on blockchain technology, which offers a decentralized and tamper-resistant ledger, ensuring integrity and immutability of the asset's history.
3. Transfer and ownership: NFTs facilitate easy transfer and proof of ownership. Since they exist on a blockchain, ownership and transfer of NFTs can be publicly verified.

=== Implications in the art world ===
In the art world, NFTs have been both lauded and criticized:

- Provenance and legitimacy: They provide a new way to establish and track the provenance of digital artworks, which has traditionally been challenging digitally.
- Market impact: NFTs have created new markets and opportunities for digital artists, enabling more effective monetization of digital works. One such NFT artwork was sold for $69 million in 2021 by artist Beeple.
- Controversies: Concerns have been raised about environmental impacts of blockchain technology, potential for copyright infringement, and the speculative nature of NFT markets. In 2023, The Guardian reported 95% of NFT collections were worthless.

=== Legal considerations ===
As with traditional COAs, the legal implications of NFTs are still being explored. Issues like copyright ownership, transfer of rights and the legal status of NFTs in various jurisdictions have ongoing debate and development.

== See also ==
- Digital certificates
- NFT
- C2PA
