= Pak (creator) =

Digital artist

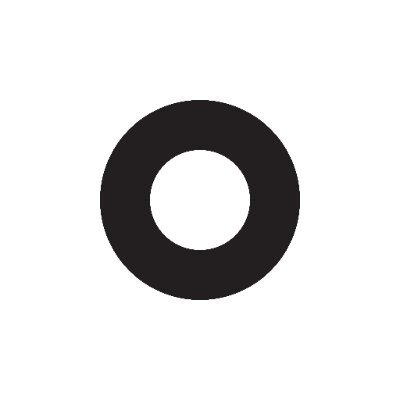
- The logo for Pak.
- Other names: Murat Pak, The Nothing
- Occupation: Digital creator
- Notable work: Archillect, Merge

Pak, formerly known as Murat Pak, is a digital artist, cryptocurrency investor, and programmer. Pak is known for creating the curation platform Archillect, an internet bot which reshares media based on user interactions with content hosted on various social platforms and for launching a platform for burning (permanently removing from circulation) NFTs to receive tokens of the cryptocurrency Ash.

Pak is best known for working with non-fungible tokens. Pak's highest-selling NFT, "Merge", generated $91.8 million in sales in December 2021 and is one of the most expensive non-fungible tokens. Pak's NFTs have been sold on platforms including Sotheby's, Nifty Gateway, MakersPlace, SuperRare, and Async Art.

== History ==
The identity of Pak is unknown and some speculate that it may be a team. Pak is also credited for having introduced Beeple to NFTs in October 2020. Between February 2020 and April 2022, more than 180,300 NFTs by Pak were sold across the primary and secondary markets, raising $394.9 million.

== Archillect ==
In 2014, Pak created Archillect (a portmanteau of archive and intellect), an internet bot that acts as a curation platform. It searches through social media and posts images to several social media platforms. Posts are selected in order to be shared as widely as possible, adapting to provide more of the content people are sharing. Archillect has been compared to AI composer Emily Howell as examples of "artistic bots". It has also been described as a mood board. Pak described Archillect as a "digital muse" and refers to it as "she".

The account has been criticized for sharing content without attribution or with poor attribution. A second account was created to post attribution or sources for images when available and Pak has claimed to take down images on request, though this reactive approach has also been criticized.

== NFTs ==
=== Style ===
Pak is known for a style that takes advantage of blockchain technology, specifically its smart contracts, described as an appeal to cryptocurrency fans. The images associated with Pak's NFTs use geometric shapes or programmatically generated images. Pak frequently embeds hidden messages into NFTs, and uses social media platforms in a candid way to promote and discuss them. Pak's use of NFTs has been described as challenging the concepts of value and ownership.

=== Works ===
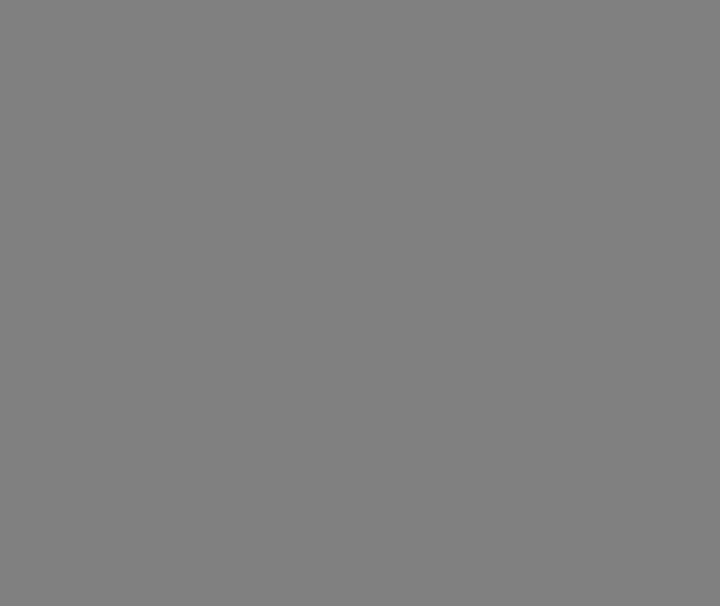
Pak's "The Pixel", an NFT of which sold for $1.36 million at Sotheby's.

Pak's first NFT, "Cloud Monument Dark", was released on February 3, 2020 on SuperRare, an NFT marketplace. In August 2020, Pak released project "X" on NiftyGateway, an "open edition" sale of NFTs with a scarcity mechanism based on time rather than volume. Thirteen NFTs were offered for sale in multiples for a window of twenty-four hours.

In March 2021, Charles Stewart, CEO of Sotheby's, announced a partnership with Pak to launch the auction house's first NFT sale. This partnership resulted in "The Fungible", an open edition which generated $16.8 million in sales across 6,156 NFTs over two days. The Sotheby's sale and subsequent press raised Pak's public profile, specifically with regards to the role of NFTs in the art world. As part of Pak's partnership with Sotheby's, Pak also auctioned "The Pixel", which sold for $1.36 million, and "The Switch", which sold for $1.4 million.

On October 15, 2021, Sotheby's launched the "Sotheby's Metaverse", a digital art platform for selling and curating NFTs, which offers users a unique personal profile picture generated by Pak.

On December 2, 2021, Pak launched the sale of "Merge" on Nifty Gateway. "Merge" was made available for 48 hours, with buyers able to purchase "mass units" rather than individual copies of an NFT edition. Buyers received a single NFT with its associated image generated based the transaction metadata and the number of "mass units" purchased. In total, 312,686 mass units were sold to 28,983 buyers generating $91.8 million.

In February 2022, "Censored", a series of NFTs, were auctioned as a fundraiser for the legal defense of Julian Assange. One NFT, "The Clock", was sold for 16,593 ETH ($52.8 million) to AssangeDAO, an online community of 10,000 people who pooled cryptocurrency for the bid. A second auction as part of "Censored" raised 671 ETH, approximately worth $2.1 million at that time, for separate organizations. $1.9 million in cryptocurrency from the Censored sale was donated to the Ukraine government.
