= Nifty Gateway Studio =

Auction platform for non-fungible token art

- Industry: Entertainment
- Founded: 2019
- Founder: Duncan and Griffin Cock Foster
- Headquarters: New York
- Products: Social Entertainment and Creative Experiences
- Owner: Cameron Winklevoss; Tyler Winklevoss
- Parent: Gemini Trust Company
- Website: niftygateway.com

Nifty Gateway Studio (“NGS”) is a full-service, digital production studio working with creators and brands to develop and distribute immersive social entertainment and creative experiences onchain.

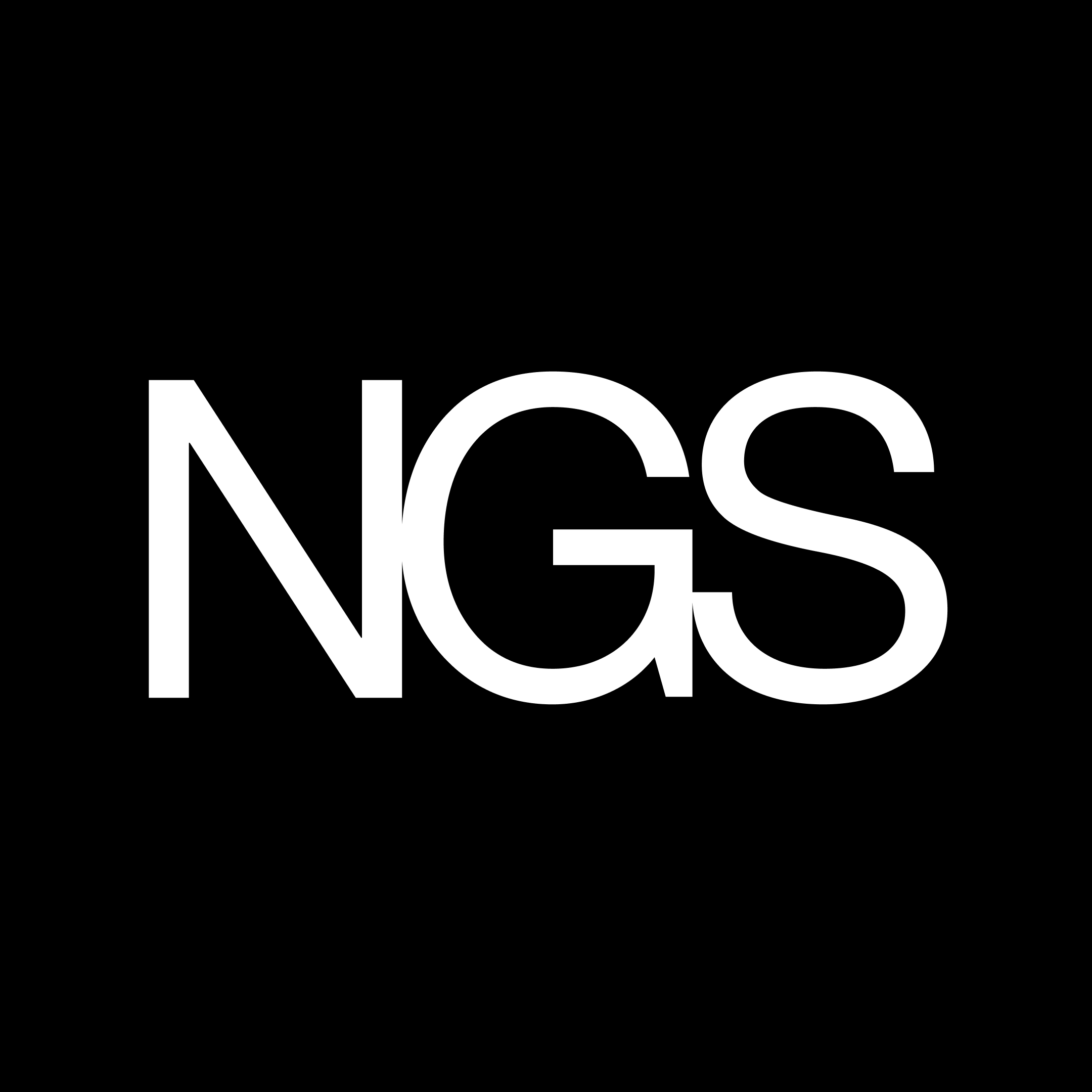

NGS is known for its collaborations with creators such as Refik Anadol, BEEPLE, PAK, Sam Spratt, and Daniel Arsham.

On January 24, 2026 NGS announced that the platform will be closing operations on February 23, 2026. This announcement was updated to a new closure deadline of April 23, 2026.

== History ==
Founded in 2019 by Duncan and Griffin Cock Foster with the goal of transforming the art market, Nifty Gateway attracted the attention of Cameron and Tyler Winklevoss, founders of Gemini Trust Company, who acquired Nifty Gateway later that year. The acquisition led to Nifty Gateway’s expansion and was followed by collaborations with artists such as Refik Anadol, BEEPLE, PAK, Sam Spratt, and Daniel Arsham, as well as brands including Samsung, Playboy, Starbucks and others.

== Nifty Gateway Studio ==
In 2024, Nifty Gateway rebranded as Nifty Gateway Studio (“NGS”), transitioning from an NFT marketplace to a full-service digital production studio that collaborates with partners throughout the creative process, focusing on brand and IP growth.

As emerging technologies raise complex questions about ownership, NGS uses onchain technology to address modern intellectual property challenges, giving creators control over their creative IP—including copyright, distribution, and merchandising—while supporting them with royalties.
