= Bored Ape =

NFT collection on the Ethereum blockchain

Bored Ape Yacht Club
- Bored Ape characters used by the creators of the project
- Developer: Yuga Labs LLC
- Platform: Ethereum
- Release: April 30, 2021

Bored Ape Yacht Club (BAYC), often colloquially called Bored Apes or Bored Ape, is a non-fungible token (NFT) collection built on the Ethereum blockchain with the ERC-721 standard. The collection features profile pictures of cartoon apes that are procedurally generated by an algorithm.

The parent company of Bored Ape Yacht Club is Yuga Labs. The project launched in April 2021. Owners of a Bored Ape NFT are granted access to a private online club, exclusive in-person events, and intellectual property rights for the image.

In 2022, Yuga Labs was valued at US$4 billion. This is due in large part to the sales of the Bored Ape Yacht Club NFT collection totalling over US$1 billion as well as high value auction sales from their investor, now defunct FTX. Various celebrities purchased these non-fungible tokens, including Justin Bieber, Snoop Dogg and Gwyneth Paltrow. During their 2021-2022 peak valuation, individual Bored Ape NFTs sold for millions of dollars, the most expensive for over $24 million. By April 2024, they had lost approximately 90% of their value relative to their 2022 peak.

== Development and function ==
Yuga Labs LLC
- Founded: 2021; 5 years ago
- Area served: Global
- Founders: Greg Solano ("Gargamel"); Wylie Aronow ("Gordon Goner"); Zeshan Ali ("No Sass"); Kerem Atalay ("Emperor Tomato Ketchup")
- CEO: Daniel Alegre
- Industry: Cryptocurrency
- Website: yuga.com

According to the Bored Ape Yacht Club (BAYC) website, the NFT collection was created by four friends who "set out to make some dope apes, test [their] skills, and try to build something (ridiculous)." Bored Ape NFTs, like other NFTs created and used for digital art purposes aim to provide its owners the "original" artwork. Bored Ape NFTs owners are considered in possession of "a unique unit of data recorded in a digital blockchain, which permanently records its provenance or sales history."

The collection exists on the Ethereum blockchain and contains 10,000 unique NFTs derived from 172 unique assets. The NFTs function dually as a membership card to Yacht Club. Membership to the club includes access to THE BATHROOM (stylized in all caps), a digital graffiti board where users commonly "draw dicks," according to the founder. The NFTs were originally sold for 0.08 ether each, around $190 at the time of their April 2021 launch and were sold out in 12 hours.

As BAYC "has made it clear that NFT holders have full commercialization rights to their ape," Bored Apes differ from other NFTs in that "whoever owns a Bored Ape can spin it into whatever film, music, TV, book, or media project they want."

=== Founders ===
Two of the founders of BAYC, going by the pseudonyms "Gargamel" and "Gordon Goner", describe themselves as "literary bros". The two told The New Yorker they initially bonded by arguing about the work of David Foster Wallace. The two of them grew up together in Miami. The other two founders go by the pseudonyms "No Sass" and "Emperor Tomato Ketchup", the latter deriving his alias from the 1996 Stereolab album of the same name. As of July 2023, three out of four founders have left the company.

In February 2022, Gargamel and Gordon Goner's identities were revealed to be Greg Solano and Wylie Aronow, respectively, by BuzzFeed News. Upon this revelation, Nicole Muniz, then CEO of Yuga Labs, confirmed BuzzFeed's report. Solano and Aronow went to Twitter, commenting they were doxxed and uploaded images of themselves next to their Bored Ape profile pictures. Solano is a writer and editor, while No Sass and Emperor Tomato Ketchup are programmers. Aronow, the son of boat tycoon Donald Aronow, has been documented as planning to attend an MFA program, before becoming addicted to crack cocaine and alcohol, falling ill and becoming a cryptocurrency day trader.

Solano and Aronow brought in two friends of theirs, No Sass and Emperor Tomato Ketchup, programmers who could handle the blockchain coding. The latter two were knowledgeable in computer science, having studied the field at the same university Solano attended; however, they "were not crypto-savvy," having both written their first lines of Solidity code, a language used for smart contracts, in February 2021.

Solano and Aronow came up with the concept of "a shared digital canvas: anyone who bought in could draw on it." They likened this canvas to a bathroom at a dive bar; this idea stuck with the two, and they created a science-fiction storyline centered around it. In an interview with The New Yorker, Aronow elaborated on the concept, which centered on early cryptocurrency investors all becoming billionaires:

Now they're just fucking bored. What do you do now that you're wealthy beyond your wildest dreams? You're going to hang out in a swamp club with a bunch of apes and get weird.

Aronow clarified that apes were chosen as a mascot for the NFT because of the cryptocurrency phrase aping in, meaning to buy into a new currency or NFT with abandon, risking a significant amount of money.

All Seeing Seneca, or simply Seneca, an Asian-American artist, is credited as the lead designer of the artwork featured in Bored Ape NFTs. Seneca clarified that she was not the sole illustrator of the artwork, but the "lead artist of the original collection" and that the ape's body is "exactly line-for-line" her drawing.

BAYC co-founder Gargamel stated that "Thomas Dagley, Migwashere, and a couple who chose to remain anonymous" handled traits and environments. Seneca did however, "develop some of the major traits, like the grinning mouth, the popping eyes, and the beanie." Gargamel stated he was "struck" by the expressiveness of Seneca's characters and that "for the apes, we arrived at exactly the mood we were after: existential boredom." Although unable to share specifics, Seneca did state her financial compensation was not ideal, but that she was "grateful for the experience" and stated that "not of ton of people know that I did these drawings, which is terrible for an artist." [sic]

=== Post-launch ===
After Bored Ape NFTs became popular, Yuga Labs hired artists, social media managers, Discord community managers, and a CFO. In response to the popularity surrounding Bored Ape, Aronow stated that BAYC was aiming to be a "Web3 lifestyle company." The company released secondary assets like Bored Ape Kennel Club, Mutant Serum, and Mutant Ape Yacht Club, which has increased BAYC's worth, brought more users into the ecosystem and rewarded previous holders and investors.

On March 11, 2022, it was announced that Yuga Labs acquired all of the CryptoPunks and Meebits intellectual property for an undisclosed sum. Yuga Labs stated they were granting complete commercial rights to CryptoPunks owners.

On March 16, 2022, ApeCoin DAO launched its own token separate from Yuga Labs known as "ApeCoin" ($APE), which was used to build tokenomics for their products. The token smart contract has been audited by CertiK and softstack (formerly Chainsulting).

On April 25, 2022, the official Instagram account of the company was hacked and a phishing link was posted on it. As a result, four Bored Ape NFTs, along with ten more from related collections by Yuga Labs, were stolen with a total estimated worth of approximately $3 million. $1 million worth of funds were transferred into the hacker's account.

On April 30, 2022, Yuga Labs launched its metaverse Otherside, as a collaboration with Animoca Brands. Bored Ape NFTs feature in the music video for Eminem and Snoop Dogg's song "From the D 2 the LBC".

In December 2022, Activision Blizzard COO Daniel Alegre succeeded Nicole Muniz as CEO of Yuga Labs in an effort to shift the company toward metaverse gaming projects. In January 2023, Yuga Labs launched an endless runner video game called Dookey Dash for holders of the BAYC NFTs. Getting the highest score granted the player a "golden key" NFT, which Twitch streamer Mongraal won and subsequently sold to Adam Weitsman for $1.6 million.

== Valuation history ==
Bored Apes reached a peak floor price of 128 Etherium in May 2022, equivalent to about $354,000 USD at the time. The most expensive Bored Ape ever sold was in an auction by Sotheby's in September 2021 for over $24 million. By May 2024, their floor price had declined to 13.395 Etherium, or around $40,000 in 2024 USD, an approximately 90% loss in value. Two Bored Ape NFTs purchased by Justin Bieber in 2021 for the equivalent of $1.3 million and by Eminem in 2022 for the equivalent of $460,000, had their highest bids in early 2026 of around $2,800, representing an almost total wipeout of value.

== Legal issues ==
=== SEC investigation ===
In October 2022, it was reported that the U.S. Securities and Exchange Commission were investigating Yuga Labs amid concerns that their NFTs were unregistered security offerings. Since the fall of Yuga's investor, FTX, there is a wider concern to regulate cryptocurrencies and NFTs.

=== Class action lawsuit ===
On December 8, 2022, a class action lawsuit was filed against the Bored Ape Yacht Club parent company, Yuga Labs, alleging their product is an unregistered security that was promoted through fraudulent undisclosed celebrity endorsements. The class action names many celebrities who promoted the NFTs such as Diplo, Snoop Dogg, Post Malone, Kevin Hart as well as Yuga Labs' business partner, Guy Oseary, in being part of the 'scheme'. In addition, the suit also names Moonpay and auction house Sotheby's for contributing to the scheme. The lawsuit was dismissed in September 2025.

== Reception ==
=== Popularity and celebrity collectors ===
Bored Apes have been documented by the media as one of the more prominent NFTs. In December 2021, the Bored Ape Yacht Club overtook CryptoPunks as the highest-priced NFTs. Bored Apes, along with other character-based NFTs, would become "a status symbol for owners who regularly use their animated creatures as avatars on social media". Senior Writer, Kate Knibbs from Wired called the popularity of Bored Apes "a gimmick, plain and simple". Many Bored Ape NFT owners admitted to purchasing their Apes due to the potential marketing and branding projects that can be launched through owning the intellectual property of a Bored Ape NFT. In November 2021, Rolling Stone released Bored Ape magazine covers as an NFT magazine. A year later the same publication declared that "NFTs are finally totally worthless." Universal Music Group has signed a band composed of three Bored Apes and one Mutant Ape.

On January 4, 2022, Markets Insider wrote that "Since its inception, the collection has amassed around 11,000 unique owners, according to CryptoSlam. On average, an ape has sold for 84 ether or roughly $344,000 as of publishing." Companies were also noted to purchase Bored Ape NFTs; Adidas bought one in September 2021. Many online media publications wrote about celebrities collecting Bored Apes in late 2021 and early 2022; Eminem, Gwyneth Paltrow, Shaquille O'Neal, Neymar, Snoop Dogg, Mark Cuban, Post Malone, Stephen Curry, Paris Hilton, Jimmy Fallon, and Serena Williams are among various celebrities noted to have purchased Bored Apes. In some cases of celebrities owning Bored Ape NFTs, such as with Justin Bieber, it has been reported that the actual purchase of the NFT may not have been made by the celebrity themselves.

Bored Ape Yacht Club holds hosted events in New York, California, Hong Kong, and the UK for its owners. In November 2021, the company held a yacht party and a performance featuring Chris Rock, Aziz Ansari, and The Strokes as part of an entertainment weekend in New York; an "ApeFest" event in June 2022 at South Street Seaport featured LCD Soundsystem and Haim alongside "Doop Snogg", a Snoop Dogg impersonator who several attendees confused for the real Snoop Dogg.

=== Artistic merits and criticism ===
The Bored Ape NFTs have attracted a considerable amount of negative reception, with many detractors of BAYC having opined that the NFTs have had a negative impact on artists. Nevertheless, the Bored Ape design has also received some positive comments; Emma Roth of The Verge wrote that the apes were "very interesting-looking and sometimes fashionable." Cited by Intelligencer in January 2022, Roman Kräussl, an art-finance professor at the University of Luxembourg and Stanford University's Hoover Institution, stated that NFT works like Bored Apes (in addition to CryptoPunks and Cool Cats) had already become iconic.

Writing for The Cut, Claire Lampen commented, "I find the monkey mostly unremarkable, generically familiar, and not very much to my liking if not wholly offensive," and added that "[celebrities] really want us to enjoy this monkey, clap for this monkey, know what this monkey is. They can't make me. I won't let them." Jonathan Jones of The Guardian was critical of the Bored Apes NFTs' impact on digital art. Jones opined that the NFT "should put an end to any romanticism about NFT art. It puts the consumer experience first and has absolutely nothing to do with empowering artists. It's all about the collector's ego." He also wrote that "The attitude says it all. Bored, emptied out, wrecked, and proud of it. That's how the NFT art investors all feel, apparently. And so they should. NFTs are not good for art. They are not liberating for artists."

A Tonight Show with Jimmy Fallon segment featuring Fallon and Paris Hilton showing off their Bored Apes was mocked by users on Twitter. Wired described the segment as having the "stiff, cheery cadence of a bad infomercial", and wrote that the clip going viral was "fueled by people making fun of how off-putting it was". Writing for the publication, Kate Knibbs wrote negatively of Bored Apes, and contrasted it to Comedian, a 2019 artwork by Maurizio Cattelan of a banana duct taped to a wall, where the buyer received instructions for recreating the artwork rather than an actual banana:

The Bored Ape Yacht Club, in contrast, is a grimmer kind of gimmick, one that parodies nothing. It uses certificates of authenticity, too, but with a crucial difference in intent. The certificate points back to a commodity, not an idea. It doesn't mock or even question the art world; instead it simply cashes in on it. The project's sense of humor is akin to a decal of Calvin from Calvin & Hobbes taking a piss. The crudeness is the point. Each ape is a misprized thing, bought and sold constantly.

==== Red Ape Family ====
Red Ape Family, an animated sitcom about a family of Bored Apes that travel to Mars, premiered in November 2021. It was created by Hashem Zaini, the CEO of Dubai-based animation studio Zaini Media, and Youssouf Bedraoui Drissi. Each episode was accompanied by the sale of 333 NFTs, while each of the episodes were themselves made into NFTs. It was executive produced by American rapper 2 Chainz. Matthew Gault of Vice wrote of its first episode, "It sucks. The animation is bad, the writing terrible, and the voice acting atrocious."

==== Allegations of racism ====
The anthropomorphized ape cartoons within the Bored Ape Yacht Club collection have been accused of racism. According to researchers from the Anti-Defamation League, the allegations of racism are doubtful, but certain traits within the images, such as "Hip-Hop", can be seen as problematic. Record executive Damon Dash, American rapper Freddie Gibbs and 8chan founder Fredrick Brennan have stated that they believe Bored Ape Yacht Club looks racist. The founders of the Bored Ape Yacht Club adamantly deny these allegations, stating that they are a diverse group of Turkish, Cuban and Jewish friends, some of whom have voted for Bernie Sanders and that they chose apes as the focus of the collection because of the common term "aping in".

== Controversies ==
=== ApeFest ocular injuries ===
In November 2023, guests reported burning pain in their eyes and vision problems after attending a Bored Ape event known as "ApeFest," in Hong Kong. Potential causes include UV lights used at the event. On November 6, Bored Ape Yacht Club stated they were aware of the incident and claimed "...we believe that much less than 1% of those attending and working the event had these symptoms." They also encouraged attendees who feel any symptoms to seek medical attention.

=== Voiceverse NFT plagiarism scandal ===
Voiceverse is a blockchain-based startup founded by BAYC that marketed AI voice cloning technology as NFTs. On January 14, 2022, voice actor Troy Baker announced a partnership with Voiceverse, triggering immediate backlash over concerns about the environmental impact of NFTs and the potential for AI to displace voice actors. Later that day, the creator of 15.ai, a free non-commercial text-to-speech platform, revealed through server logs that Voiceverse had used 15.ai to generate voice clips of characters from My Little Pony: Friendship Is Magic, pitch-shifted them to sound unrecognizable, and falsely marketed them as their own technology before selling them as NFTs. Voiceverse admitted to the plagiarism, stating their marketing team had used 15.ai without attribution while rushing to create a demo. News publications universally characterized the incident as theft and plagiarism. Baker ended his partnership with Voiceverse on January 31, 2022.

In September 2024, a class action lawsuit was filed against LOVO, Inc., Voiceverse's parent company, by voice actors alleging illegal voice cloning; court documents cited Voiceverse's prior plagiarism of 15.ai as part of the case.

== Copycat projects ==
In late 2021, the popularity of Bored Apes spurred copycat NFT projects. PHAYC and Phunky Ape Yacht Club were two such projects centered around the same idea of selling NFTs of mirrored but otherwise identical images of Bored Ape NFTs. The OpenSea NFT marketplace banned both projects in December 2021. In February 2022, Bored Wukong was accused of copycat NFT avatars.

=== Ryder Ripps lawsuit ===
In June 2022, Yuga Labs launched a lawsuit against Ryder Ripps. Ripps is accused of false advertising and trademark infringement, with Yuga Labs requesting financial reimbursement and saying Ripps was executing a "calculated, intentional, and willful" plan to damage the reputation of the project. Ripps made a statement saying that the buyers of his NFTs were informed that they were not related to the BAYC project and that his NFTs were a satirical response to those of Yuga Labs. On August 15, 2022, he tried to file an anti-SLAPP motion to dismiss the lawsuit, which was denied; Ripps appealed the denial of his anti-SLAPP motion to dismiss, but the 9th U.S. Circuit Court of Appeals ruled against him in October 2023.

In April 2023, federal judge John F. Walter of the United States District Court for the Central District of California issued a summary judgment in Yuga Labs' favor, with damages to be determined at trial. The judge ruled that Ripps and his partner Jeremy Cahen had committed "false designation of origin" and "cybersquatting" and that Yuga Labs was entitled to an injunction and damages. Following the court trial, Judge Walter ruled that Yuga Labs was entitled to recover all $1.3 million of Ripps' and Cahen's profits from the sale of the copycat NFTs, plus $200,000 in damages for cybersquatting, plus attorneys' fees; the ruling was made public in October 2023. On July 23, 2025, an appeals court overturned the 2023 judgment and sent the case back to federal court for a trial, finding that Yuga Labs did not yet prove that Ripps and Cahen had confused NFT buyers.

== See also ==
- Bored & Hungry
- CryptoKitties
- CryptoPunks
- Rare Pepe
- List of most expensive non-fungible tokens
- Voiceverse NFT plagiarism scandal
