= Everydays: the First 5000 Days =

Digital work of art by Mike Winkelmann

- Artist: Mike Winkelmann
- Completion date: 21 February 2021
- Medium: Digital (JPEG)
- Dimensions: 21,069 × 21,069 pixels
- Owner: Vignesh Sundaresan (MetaKovan)

Everydays: the First 5000 Days is a digital work of art created by Mike Winkelmann, known professionally as Beeple. The work is a collage of 5000 digital images created by Winkelmann for his Everydays series. Its associated non-fungible token (NFT) was sold for $69.3 million at Christie's in 2021, making it the most expensive NFT ever.

== Composition ==
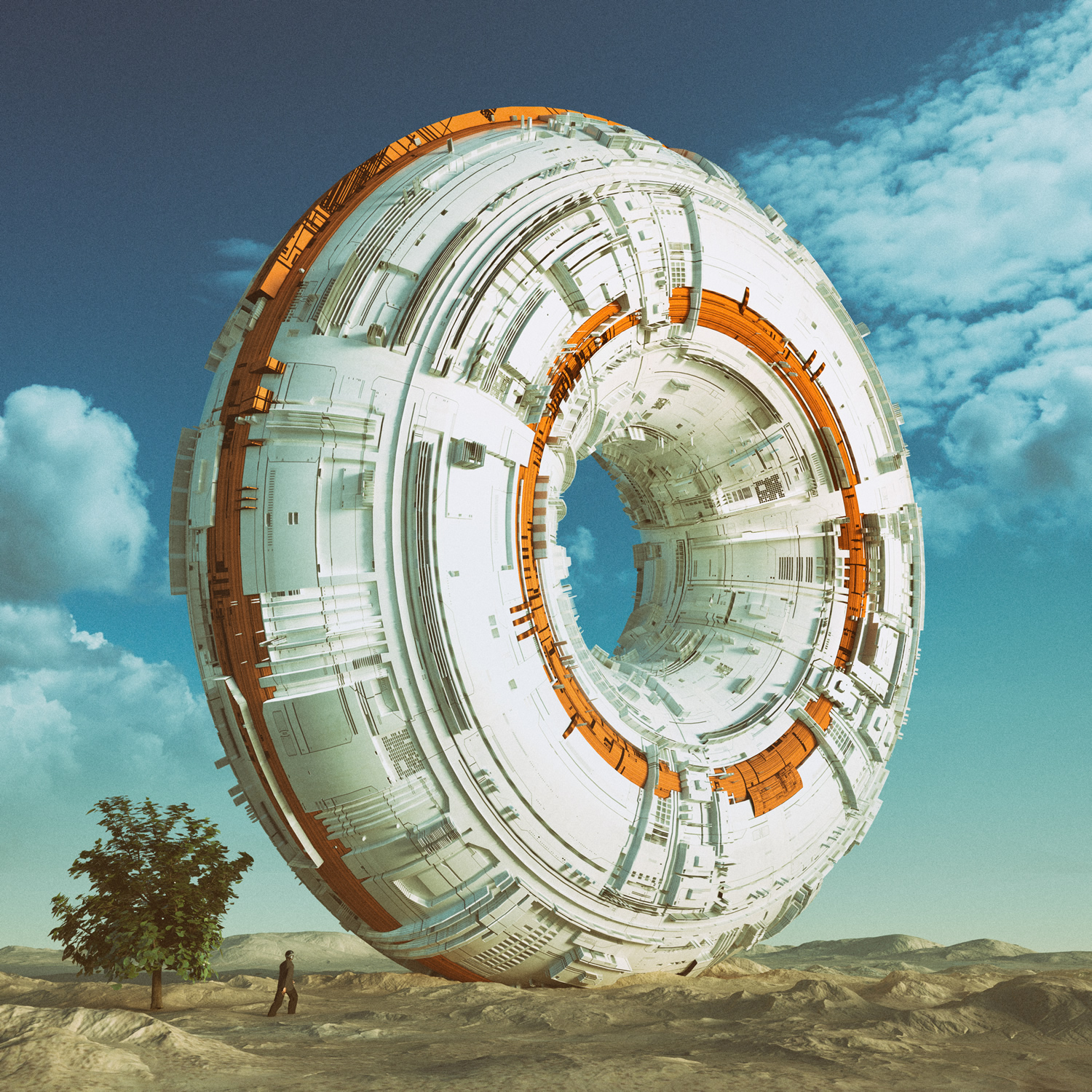
One of the 5000 images used in the artwork

Winkelmann was inspired by British artist Tom Judd and began the daily project on 1 May 2007. Some of the images involve figures from pop culture, including Jeff Bezos and Donald Trump, and are arranged chronologically. Some of the earlier images are hand-drawn and not computer-produced.

In an article published to Artnet, art critic Ben Davis asserted that some of the 5,000 images comprising the work revealed various racial, misogynistic, and homophobic stereotypes, and that the collection in general was uninteresting and of poor artistic quality. Will Gompertz considered Winkelmann a "talented exponent" of the comic book aesthetic, and compared his work to Hieronymus Bosch and Philip Guston. He predicted that the work would be regarded "either as the moment before the short-lived cryptoart bubble burst, or as the first chapter in a new story of art".

== Purchase ==
Everydays was purchased for $69.3 million in March 2021 by Singapore-based programmer Vignesh Sundaresan, a cryptocurrency investor and the founder of the Metapurse NFT project, also known online by his pseudonym MetaKovan. Sundaresan paid for the artwork using 42,329 Ether.

Both the buyer, Sundaresan, and the seller, Winkelmann, had a vested interest in driving up the price of the work, in order to bring attention to and drive sales for a speculative asset related to 20 other Beeple works, which they called "B20 tokens." The price of these tokens, in which Sundaresan held a majority stake, reached its peak during media coverage of the Everydays auction, and subsequently collapsed. Because of this, some observers have described the auction as a publicity stunt and a scam.

Sundaresan receives rights to display the artwork, but does not receive copyright. He has displayed the artwork in a digital museum within "the metaverse", which the public can view through a web browser.

== See also ==
- List of most expensive non-fungible tokens
