= Mike Winkelmann =

American digital artist (born 1981)

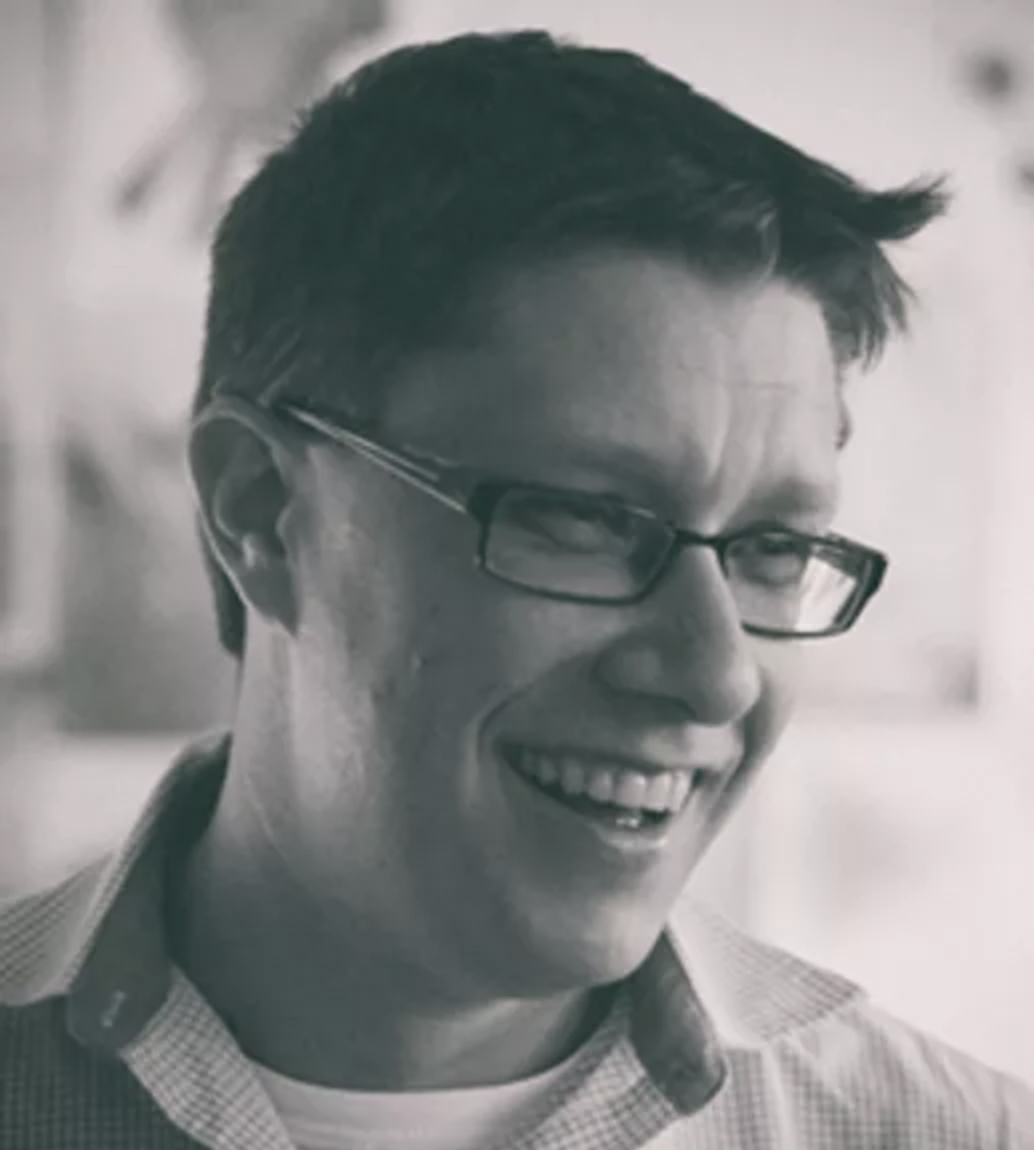
- Born: Michael Joseph Winkelmann; June 20, 1981 (age 45); Fond du Lac, Wisconsin, U.S.
- Other name: Beeple
- Education: Purdue University
- Occupation: Digital artist
- Years active: 1999–present
- Notable work: "Everydays", Everydays: the First 5000 Days
- Website: beeple-crap.com

Michael Joseph Winkelmann (born June 20, 1981), known professionally as Beeple, is an American digital artist, graphic designer, and animator known for selling NFTs. In his art, he uses various media to create comical, phantasmagoric works which make political and social commentary while using pop culture figures as references. Beeple was introduced to NFTs in October 2020 and credits Pak for providing his first "primer" on selling NFTs. The NFT associated with Everydays: the First 5000 Days, a collage of images from his "Everydays" series, was sold on March 12, 2021, for $69 million in cryptocurrency to an investor in NFTs. It is the first purely non-fungible token to be sold by Christie's. The auction house had previously sold Block 21, an NFT with accompanying physical painting for approximately $130,000 in October 2020.

== Education ==
Winkelmann was born on June 20, 1981. He grew up in North Fond du Lac, Wisconsin. His father worked as an electrical engineer and his mother worked at a senior center. He graduated from Purdue University in 2003 majoring in computer science.

== Career ==
=== "Everydays" ===
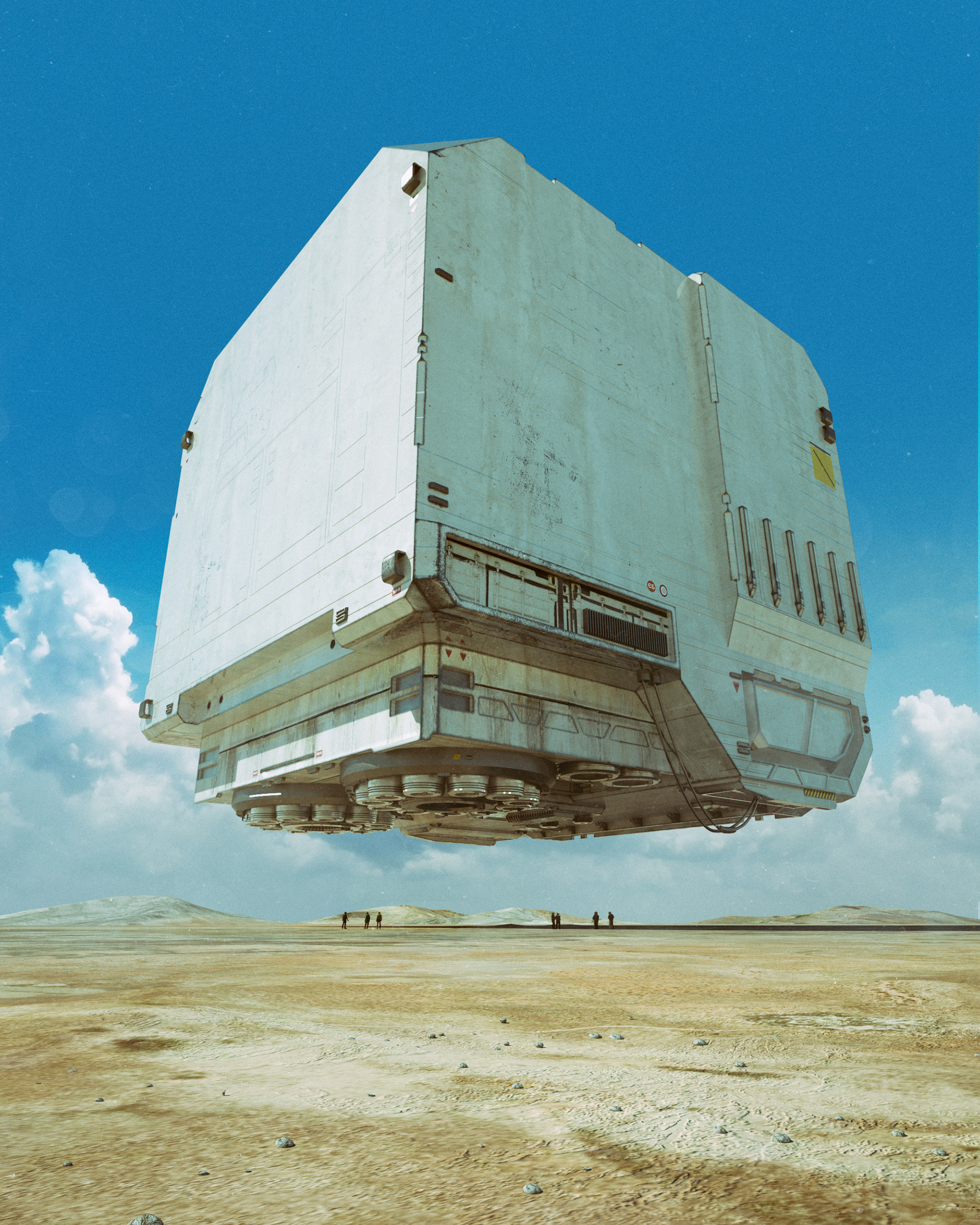
One of Winkelmann's Everydays

Mike Winkelmann began "Everydays", which involved creating a piece of art every day, on May 1, 2007. The project is ongoing and spans more than 6,800 consecutive days of digital art creation. He has discussed completing a piece of art even on days when it was inconvenient, like on his wedding day and the dates of his children's births. The project was inspired by Tom Judd, who drew every day for a year. Winkelmann thought it was a beneficial way to sharpen his drawing skills. In subsequent years, he focused on one skill or medium per year, including Adobe Illustrator in 2012 and Cinema 4D in 2015. Winkelmann's works often depict dystopian futures. Frequently he uses recognizable figures from popular culture or politics to satirize current events. Some of Winkelmann's works were incorporated into Louis Vuitton's Spring/Summer 2019 ready-to-wear collection.

=== Louis Vuitton ===
In 2019, Beeple’s Everydays was featured in Louis Vuitton’s Spring/Summer 2019 Ready-To-Wear collection. Nine Everydays were featured in the collection which was revealed during Paris Fashion Week at the Louvre. When asked by School of Motion how he thought the everyday was going to be displayed, Beeple said, “I actually thought they might not end up using them at all. So when my wife and I went to the show at the Louvre, which was just an insane experience, we half expected to not see my work at all. But then a model came out wearing one of my Everyday on her shirt... ‘Oh My God!’ It was crazy surreal. One model after the next came out wearing something I’d made.”

=== VJ Loops ===
Between 2009 and 2019, Beeple created VJ Loops. The short abstract digital art pieces were released under Creative Commons and are free for any use. They have been downloaded millions of times for use at thousands of live events all over the world. The clips are intended as source material for creatives all over the world and number in the hundreds.

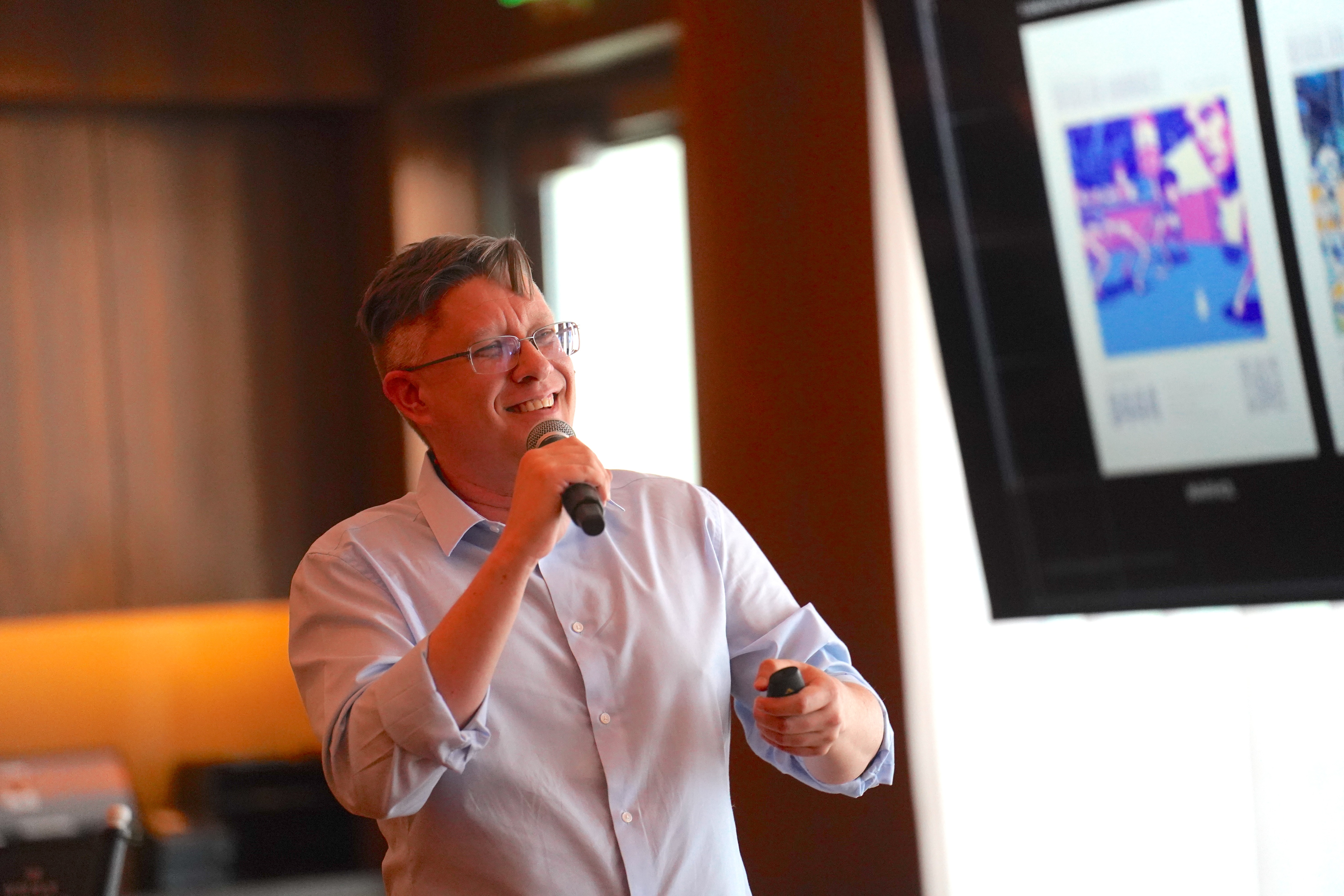
Beeple speaking at Art Basel Miami Beach 2025

=== NFT sales ===
In February 2020, Winkelmann started selling non-fungible tokens, digital tokens associated with works of art whose ownership is verified by a blockchain. The first sale of a Beeple NFT titled "SUPER EXTRACTION" took place at ETH Denver in February 2020., and more were sold on Nifty Gateway in November 2020. One of these NFTs, Crossroad, would change into one of two animations depending on the victor of the 2020 United States presidential election; it was sold for $66,666.66 and resold for $6.7 million in February 2021. The NFT associated with Everydays: the First 5000 Days, a collage of images from the "Everydays" series, was put up for auction at Christie's on February 25 and sold for $69,400,000 on March 11, 2021. This was the first NFT to be sold by a legacy auction house, and is the first sale at Christie's that could be paid in Ether. In March 2021 Beeple called NFTs an "irrational exuberance bubble".

On January 30, 2024 his artwork, made in 2021 in collaboration with TIME, "TIME: The future of Business", previously owned by 3AC, was auctioned at Sotheby's and sold for $177,800.

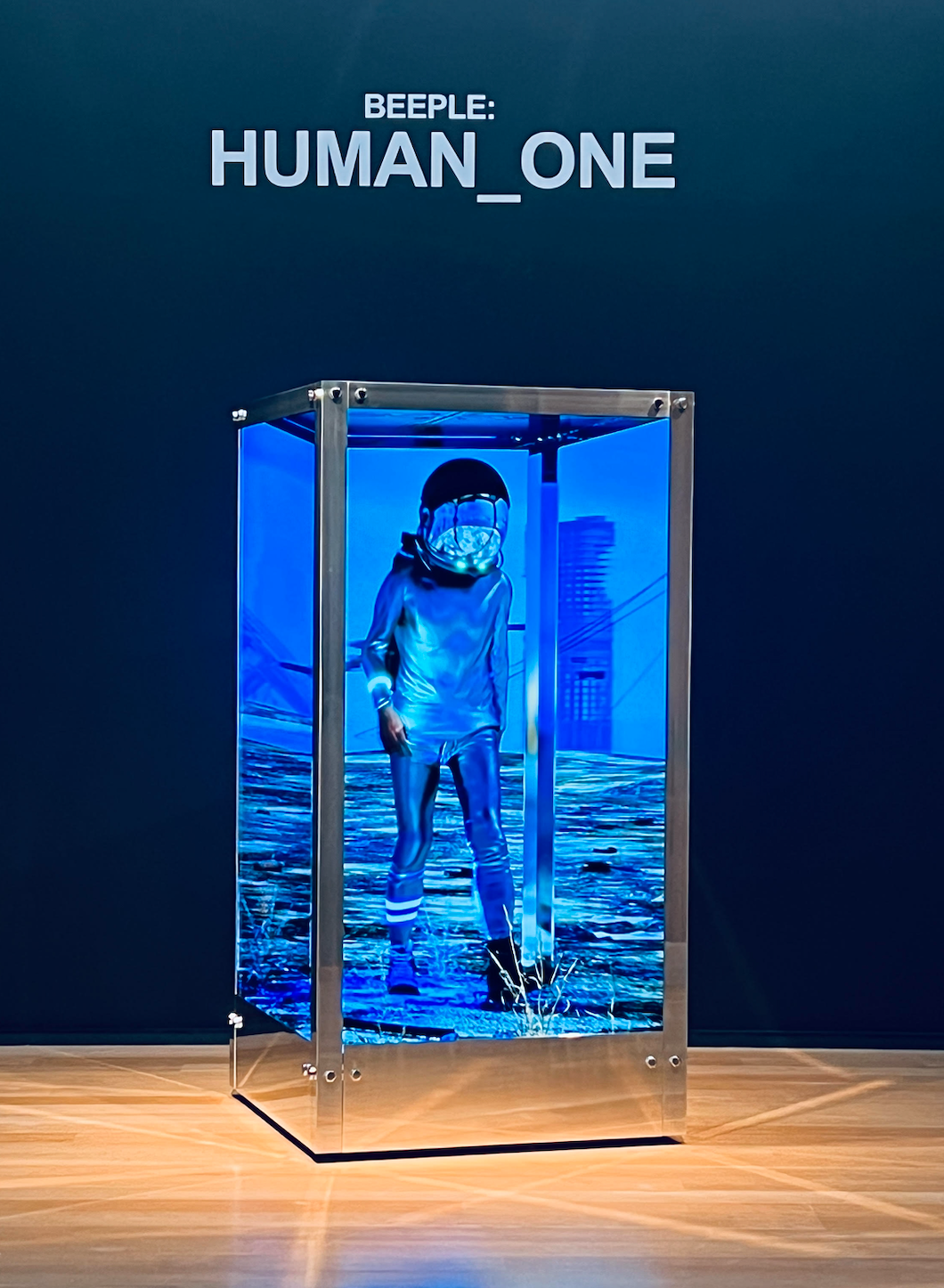
Beeple, "Human One," November 2021

=== Human One ===
On November 9, 2021, one of Beeple's artworks (Human One) was sold at Christie's for $28,958,000 to collector Ryan Zurrer. The artwork is a 7-foot-high sculpture; a generative work of art, a dynamically changing hybrid sculpture, both physically and digitally. Beeple described the artwork as "the first portrait of a human born in the metaverse." It is the first major work made by the artist that has both a sculptural and NFT component. After the sale, Human One was exhibited at the Castello di Rivoli Museum of Contemporary Art in April 2022. It was the artist's debut museum exhibition. Then, the work was shown at the M+ Museum, marking the work's Asian premiere and the artist's first solo show in Asia.

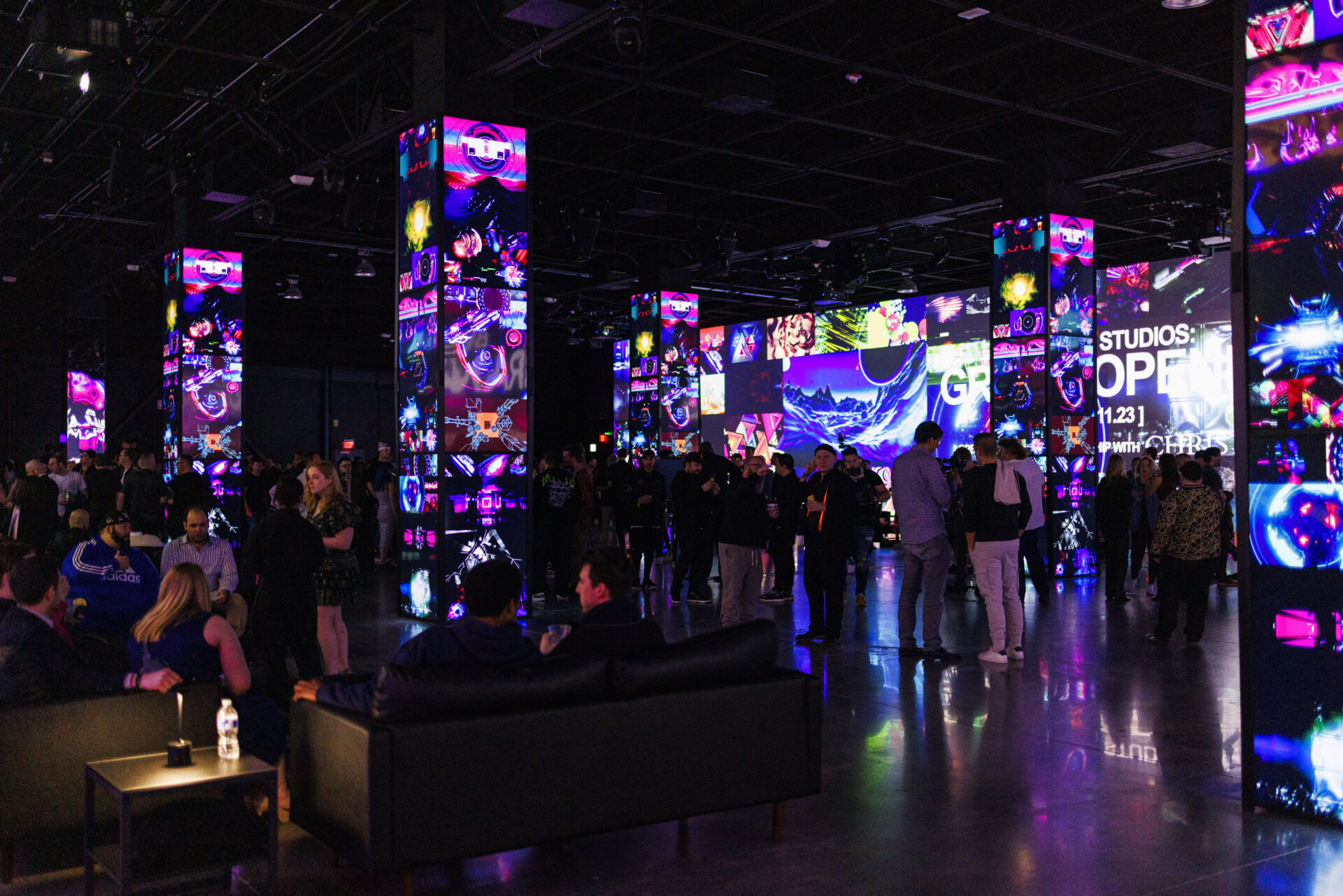
Grand opening event at Beeple Studios, March 2023

=== The Tree of Knowledge ===
In 2024, Beeple unveiled his new generative sculpture "The Tree of Knowledge" at Italian Tech Week. The sculpture features four video screens forming a rectangular pillar, displaying an endless video of a tree intertwined with industrial elements. Influenced by real-time data, including news channels, stock and cryptocurrency tickers, the sculpture is both a critique to modern society and a call to action for urgent environmental awareness. Viewers can adjust the display from "Signal" (order) to "Noise" (chaos). The piece was sold to investment management company Lingotto, with proceeds supporting non-profit initiatives all over the world.

=== Diffuse Control ===
In 2025, Beeple created a digital artwork called Diffuse Control that examines distributed authorship and mass collaboration through an evolving artificial intelligence system. The work operates across three layers of control shared by the artist, curators, and viewers. Audiences can interact with and modify the visual output in real time, directly shaping each presentation, while curators introduce new imagery and contextual frameworks that guide thematic direction. Rather than existing as a fixed object, Diffuse Control functions as an adaptive system informed by collective input. The work was premiered at The Shed in New York and was later exhibited at Beeple Studios and the Los Angeles County Museum of Art (LACMA) and Node Foundation in Palo Alto.

=== Transient Bloom ===
Transient Bloom (2025) is a large-scale generative digital environment by Beeple that explores impermanence, collective memory, and distributed authorship through artificial intelligence. Drawing inspiration from Claude Monet’s studies of light and transience, the work presents a continuously evolving garden where organic forms merge with imagery drawn from digital culture. AI processes transform visual inputs into shifting landscapes, while curators and audiences influence the system through participation. Rather than a fixed installation, Transient Bloom functions as an adaptive, participatory artwork shaped by ongoing human and machine interaction. The work was revealed to the public on September 13, 2025, at the Toledo Museum of Art.

=== Regular Animals ===
In 2025, at Art Basel Miami Beach, Beeple presented an installation titled Regular Animals in the fair’s newly introduced Zero 10 digital art section. The work consists of animatronic robot dogs, each equipped with hyper-realistic heads resembling tech figures such as Elon Musk, Jeff Bezos, Mark Zuckerberg and artists including Pablo Picasso and Andy Warhol, alongside versions bearing Beeple’s own likeness. The robotic quadrupeds, designed to move autonomously, photograph their surroundings with built-in cameras and produce printed images that are output from their rear ends, were ultimately linked and turned into non-fungible tokens (NFTs). Editions of the robot dogs were offered for sale during the fair’s VIP preview, with pricing reported at around $100,000 per piece. The installation was one of several works highlighting digital and technology-driven art at the event, and was noted for its integration of robotics, imaging and automated print outputs. The show remained on view through the duration of Art Basel Miami Beach, from December 3 to 7, 2025.

=== Beeple Studios ===
In 2021, Beeple began building a team and working in various locations in Charleston, South Carolina, before finding a home at Beeple Studios in the fall of 2021. Beeple Studios is a 50,000 sq ft space in Charleston which houses offices, lab spaces, a white wall gallery, and an immersive experiential space for showcasing digital art, and has been described as "a weird mix of Warhol's studio and Bell Labs". The studio had its grand opening on March 11, 2023 with a large event that had the biggest names in the crypto, NFT, and traditional art worlds in attendance. Since then, Beeple has hosted additional events and is still actively planning and producing live events. In 2026, Beeple Studios hosted ApeFest, the annual event dedicated to the Bored Ape Yacht Club NFT collection.

== Exhibitions ==
=== Solo exhibitions ===
- 2019: 12 Years of Everydays, Northern Contemporary, Toronto, Canada
- 2022: Human One, Castello di Rivoli Museo d'Arte Contemporanea (part of Espressioni project)
- 2022: Uncertain Future, Jack Hanley Gallery, New York City, New York
- 2023: M+ Hong Kong, Hong Kong
- 2023: Human One, Crystal Bridges Museum of American Art, Bentonville, Arkansas
- 2024: Tales from a Synthetic Future, Deji Art Museum, Nanjing, China
- 2024: Tree of Knowledge, Italian Tech Week, Turin, Italy
- 2025: Transient Bloom, Toledo Museum of Art, Toledo, Ohio
- 2025: Diffuse Control, Los Angeles County Museum of Art (LACMA), Los Angeles, California
- 2025: Diffuse Control, The Shed, New York City, New York
- 2025: Tree of Knowledge, Gibbes Museum of Art, Charleston, South Carolina
- 2026: / Infinite_Loop, NODE gallery, Palo Alto, California

== Personal life ==
Winkelmann is based in North Charleston, South Carolina, and moved there from Wisconsin in 2017. He is married and has two children.

== See also ==
- List of most expensive non-fungible tokens
