= EtherRock =

Non-Fungible Token on Ethereum

- The original 2013 public domain clipart on which the collection is based
- Platform: Ethereum
- Release: December 2017
- Genre: Collectable

EtherRock (also called EthRock) is a collection of 100 non-fungible token (NFT) on the Ethereum blockchain, created in December 2017. Each token depicts a stylized, differently colored rock image.

== History ==
EtherRock was launched in December 2017 through a smart contract that generated 100 tokens using publicly available clipart imagery. The tokens were made available on the Ethereum blockchain, where ownership could be transferred between users. During the project's first three years, approximately 30 of the 100 EtherRocks were sold.

In August 2021, interest in EtherRock increased amid broader growth in the NFT market. Public attention, including commentary from entrepreneur Gary Vaynerchuk, coincided with a sharp rise in prices, with the lowest listed EtherRock reportedly reaching approximately $300,000. Around the same period, cryptocurrency entrepreneur Justin Sun was reported to have purchased an EtherRock for approximately $500,000.

In March 2022, a collector by the name of "Dino Dealer" stated that an EtherRock had been mistakenly listed for 444 WEI ($0.0012 USD) instead of 444 ETH ($1.2M USD). The NFT was subsequently acquired by another party and later relisted at a significantly higher price. Reports of the incident were based on statements made by the seller.
