= Non-fungible token =

Unique digital identifier that is recorded on a blockchain

Illustration of a non-fungible token generated by a smart contract (a program designed to automatically execute contract terms)

A non-fungible token (NFT) is a unique digital identifier that is recorded on a blockchain and is used to certify ownership and authenticity. They typically contain references to digital files such as artworks, photos, videos, and audio. Because NFTs are uniquely identifiable, they differ from cryptocurrencies (which are fungible, hence the name non-fungible token), and as a result they cannot be copied, substituted, or subdivided. Their ownership can be transferred by the owner, allowing NFTs to be sold and traded.

Initially pitched in 2017 as a new class of investment asset, NFT trading increased from US$82 million in 2020 to US$17 billion in 2021. Its market was occasionally compared to an economic bubble or a Ponzi scheme. In 2022, the NFT market collapsed; a May 2022 estimate was that the number of sales was down over 90% compared to 2021. By September 2023 one report claimed that over 95% of NFT collections had zero monetary value.

Proponents claim that NFTs provide a public certificate of authenticity or proof of ownership, but the legal rights conveyed by an NFT can be uncertain. The ownership of an NFT as defined by the blockchain has no inherent legal meaning and does not necessarily grant copyright, intellectual property rights, or other legal rights over its associated digital file. An NFT does not restrict the sharing or copying of its associated digital file and does not prevent the creation of NFTs that reference identical files. NFTs have been used as speculative investments and have drawn criticism for the energy cost and carbon footprint associated with some types of blockchain, as well as their use in art scams.

== Characteristics ==
An NFT is a data file, stored on a type of digital ledger called a blockchain, which can be sold and traded. The NFT can be associated with a particular asset – digital or physical – such as an image, art, music, or recording of a sports event. It may confer licensing rights to use the asset for a specified purpose. An NFT (and, if applicable, the associated license to use, copy, or display the underlying asset) can be traded and sold on digital markets. However, the extralegal nature of NFT trading usually results in an informal exchange of ownership over the asset that has no legal basis for enforcement, and so often confers little more than use as a status symbol.

NFTs function like cryptographic tokens, but unlike cryptocurrencies, NFTs are not usually mutually interchangeable, so they are not fungible. A non-fungible token contains data links, for example which point to details about where the associated art is stored, that can be affected by link rot.

=== Copyright ===
A diagram showing the right to own a non-fungible token and linked file. In most cases, it is heavily dependent on the token's smart contract.

An NFT solely represents a proof of ownership of a blockchain record and does not necessarily imply that the owner possesses intellectual property rights to the digital asset the NFT purports to represent. Someone may sell an NFT that represents their work, but the buyer will not necessarily receive copyright to that work, and the seller may not be prohibited from creating additional NFT copies of the same work. According to legal scholar Rebecca Tushnet, "In one sense, the purchaser acquires whatever the art world thinks they have acquired. They definitely do not own the copyright to the underlying work unless it is explicitly transferred."

Certain NFT projects, such as Bored Apes, explicitly assign intellectual property rights of individual images to their respective owners. The NFT collection CryptoPunks was a project that initially prohibited owners of its NFTs from using the associated digital artwork for commercial use, but later allowed such use upon acquisition by the collection's parent company.

== History ==
=== Early projects ===
The first known NFT, Quantum, was created by Kevin McCoy and Anil Dash in May 2014. It consists of a video clip made by McCoy's wife, Jennifer. McCoy registered the video on the Namecoin blockchain and sold it to Dash for $4, during a live presentation for the Seven on Seven conferences at the New Museum in New York City. McCoy and Dash referred to the technology as "monetized graphics". This explicitly linked a non-fungible, tradable blockchain marker to a work of art, via on-chain metadata (enabled by Namecoin).

In October 2015, Etheria, was launched and demonstrated at DEVCON 1 in London, Ethereum's first developer conference, three months after the launch of the Ethereum blockchain. Most of Etheria's 457 purchasable and tradable hexagonal tiles went unsold for more than five years until March 13, 2021, when renewed interest in NFTs sparked a buying frenzy. Within 24 hours, all tiles of the current version and a prior version, each hardcoded to 1 ETH (US$0.43 at the time of launch) were sold for a total of US$1.4 million.

In 2016, Rare Pepes, a "semi-fungible" NFT project centered around the Pepe the Frog meme, which involved a collective of artists contributing their works into a curated directory, emerged on Bitcoin through a protocol known as Counterparty, which had been created in 2014 and used to create other assets.

In 2017, several NFT projects emerged on Ethereum that utilized a "fungible" token standard known as ERC-20. Curio Cards in May of that year is credited with being Ethereum's first art NFT project using the fungible standard and features artwork in the shape of a card among a variety of image types, including satirized corporate logos. The generative art project of 10,000 pixelated characters known as CryptoPunks emerged soon after in June and would later establish itself as one of the most commercially successful NFT projects. In December, a clipart based collection featuring images of rocks called EtherRock emerged.

In November 2017, the widely acclaimed blockchain game on Ethereum known as CryptoKitties launched, and is credited with pioneering what is considered to be the first bona fide non-fungible token standard, known as ERC-721. It used an early version of ERC-721 that differed from the formally published version of the standard in 2018.

=== ERC-721: Non-Fungible Token Standard ===
While experiments around non-fungibility have existed on blockchains since as early as 2012 with Colored Coins on Bitcoin, a community-driven paper called ERC-721: Non-Fungible Token Standard was published in 2018 under the initiative of civic hacker and lead author William Entriken and is recognized as pioneering the foundation for NFTs and enabling the growth of the wider eco-system. It introduced the formalization and defining of the term Non-Fungible Token "NFT" in blockchain nomenclature by establishing a standard for smart contracts known as "ERC-721" whose tokens would have unique attributes and ownership details, ensuring no two tokens are alike. The creation of derivative standards followed from its influence on Ethereum (like ERC-1155 enabling semi-fungibility) and other blockchains. Its versatility enabled the pioneering of numerous use cases, including digital artwork, deeds to physical items, real estate (including virtual), access passes, and game assets. Ultimately, the emergence of ERC-721 is recognized for having fundamentally changed the landscape of digital verification, authentication, and ownership.

==== Origins of the term "NFT" and its adoption ====
The term NFT, prior to the blockchain game CryptoKitties' adoption of ERC-721, is not known to have been used for earlier projects. Through discussion among stakeholders for the ERC-721 draft, the word deed was given consideration among other alternatives including distinguishable asset, title, token, asset, equity, ticket. Ultimately, through Entriken's initiative under the moniker "Fulldecent," a vote was held during the paper's drafting phase to decide which word would be used in the published version and "NFT" was chosen by the stakeholders.

The term "NFT" and the awareness of the ERC-721 standard received significant exposure and adopted use through the popularity of CryptoKitties in 2017. While using the standard, CryptoKitties earned the recognition of being the first mainstream NFT dApp; the game's usage was significant enough to have overwhelmed Ethereum's processing power at the time.

==== Influence ====
During the height of the breakout success of CryptoKitties and the emergence of ERC-721 tokens in 2017, an NFT marketplace called OpenSea emerged to capitalize off of the new non-fungible token standard. It positioned itself early in the NFT market landscape and grew to a $1.4 billion market cap in 2021 during the then-ongoing NFT boom.

In 2021, ArtReview's Power 100 ranked ERC-721 at the #1 spot, praising it as "the most powerful art entity in the world" for creating a new kind of market for artworks that deviated from traditional gatekeeping norms and ushered in a different kind of collector. Artist Beeple sold an ERC-721 NFT of his composite artwork known as Everydays: the First 5000 Days at Christie's for $69 million and was the first instance of a legacy arthouse dealing in NFTs.

=== General NFT market ===
The NFT market experienced rapid growth during 2020, with its value tripling to US$250 million. In the first three months of 2021, more than US$200 million were spent on NFTs.

In the early months of 2021, interest in NFTs increased after a number of high-profile sales and art auctions.

In May 2022, The Wall Street Journal reported that the NFT market was "collapsing". Daily sales of NFT tokens had declined 92% from September 2021, and the number of active wallets in the NFT market fell 88% from November 2021. While rising interest rates had impacted risky bets across the financial markets, the Journal said "NFTs are among the most speculative."

In December 2022, a programmer named Casey Rodarmor introduced a new way to add NFTs to the Bitcoin blockchain called "ordinals". By February 2023, the popularity of ordinals had led to an increase in bitcoin's payment fees and may have also partially contributed to an increase in bitcoin's price.

A September 2023 report from cryptocurrency gambling website dappGambl claimed 95% of NFTs had fallen to zero monetary value and 79% of all NFT collections have remained unsold.

== Uses ==
=== Commonly associated files ===
NFTs have been used to exchange digital tokens that link to a digital file asset. Ownership of an NFT is often associated with a license to use such a linked digital asset but generally does not confer the copyright to the buyer. Some agreements only grant a license for personal, non-commercial use, while other licenses also allow commercial use of the underlying digital asset. This kind of decentralized intellectual copyright poses an alternative to established forms of safeguarding copyright controlled by state institutions and middlemen within the respective industry.

==== Digital art ====
Digital art is a common use case for NFTs. High-profile auctions of NFTs linked to digital art have received considerable public attention; the first such major house auction took place at Christie's in 2021. The work entitled Merge by artist Pak was the most expensive NFT, with an auction price of US$91.8 million and Everydays: the First 5000 Days, by artist Mike Winkelmann (known professionally as Beeple) the second most expensive at US$69.3 million in 2021.

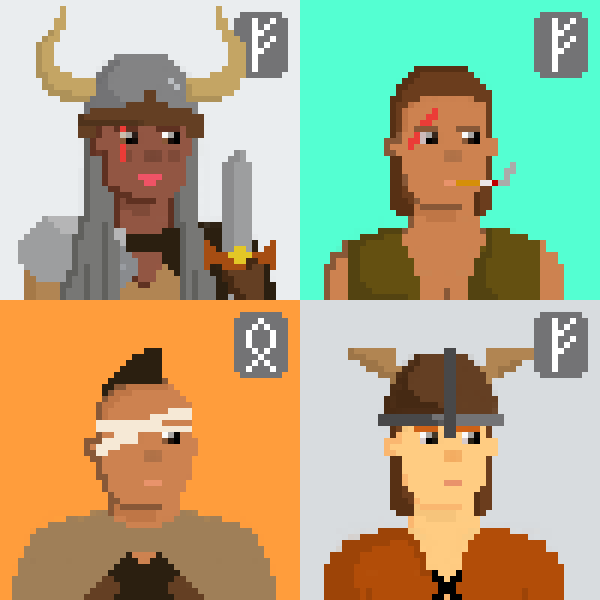
Some digital art NFTs, like these pixel art characters, are examples of generative art.

Some NFT collections, including Bored Apes, EtherRocks, and CryptoPunks, are examples of generative art, where many different images are created by assembling a selection of simple picture components in different combinations.

In March 2021, the blockchain company Injective Protocol bought a $95,000 original screen print entitled Morons (White) from English graffiti artist Banksy and filmed somebody burning it with a cigarette lighter. They uploaded (known as "minting" in the NFT scene) and sold the video as an NFT. The person who destroyed the artwork, who called themselves "Burnt Banksy", described the act as a way to transfer a physical work of art to the NFT space.

American curator and art historian Tina Rivers Ryan, who specializes in digital works, said that art museums are widely not convinced that NFTs have "lasting cultural relevance." Ryan compares NFTs to the net art fad before the dot-com bubble. In July 2022, after the controversial sale of Michelangelo's Doni Tondo in Italy, the sale of NFT reproductions of famous artworks was prohibited in Italy. Given the complexity and lack of regulation of the matter, the Ministry of Culture of Italy temporarily requested that its institutions refrain from signing contracts involving NFTs.

No centralized means of authentication exists to prevent stolen and counterfeit digital works from being sold as NFTs, although auction houses like Sotheby's, Christie's, and various museums and galleries worldwide started collaborations and partnerships with digital artists such as Refik Anadol, Dangiuz and Sarah Zucker.

NFTs associated with digital artworks could be sold and bought via NFT platforms. OpenSea, launched in 2017, was one of the first marketplaces to host various types of NFTs. In July 2019, the National Basketball Association, the NBA Players Association and Dapper Labs, the creator of CryptoKitties, started a joint venture NBA Top Shot for basketball fans that let users buy NFTs of historic moments in basketball. In 2020, Rarible was found, allowing multiple assets. In 2021, Rarible and Adobe formed a partnership to simplify the verification and security of metadata for digital content, including NFTs. In 2021, a cryptocurrency exchange Binance, launched its NFT marketplace. In 2022, eToro Art by eToro was founded, focusing on supporting NFT collections and emerging creators.

Sotheby's and Christie's auction houses showcase artworks associated with the respective NFTs both in virtual galleries and physical screens, monitors, and TVs.

Mars House, an architectural NFT created in May 2020 by artist Krista Kim, sold in 2021 for 288 Ether (ETH) — at that time equivalent to US$524,558.

==== Games ====
NFTs can represent in-game assets. Some commentators describe these as being controlled "by the user" instead of the game developer if they can be traded on third-party marketplaces without permission from the game developer. Their reception from game developers, though, has been generally mixed, with some like Ubisoft embracing the technology but Valve and Microsoft formally prohibiting them.

- CryptoKitties was an early successful blockchain online game in which players adopt and trade virtual cats. The monetization of NFTs within the game raised a $12.5 million investment, with some kitties selling for over $100,000 each. Following its success, CryptoKitties was added to the ERC-721 standard, which was created in January 2018 (and finalized in June).
- In October 2021, Valve Corporation banned applications from their Steam platform if those applications use blockchain technology or NFTs to exchange value or game artifacts.
- In December 2021, Ubisoft announced Ubisoft Quartz, "an NFT initiative which allows people to buy artificially scarce digital items using cryptocurrency". The announcement was heavily criticized by audiences, with the Quartz announcement video attaining a dislike ratio of 96% on YouTube. Ubisoft subsequently unlisted the video from YouTube. The announcement was also criticized internally by Ubisoft developers. The Game Developers Conference's 2022 annual report stated that 70 percent of developers surveyed said their studios had no interest in integrating NFTs or cryptocurrency into their games.
- Some luxury brands minted NFTs for online video game cosmetics. In November 2021, investment firm Morgan Stanley published a note claiming that this could become a US$56 billion market by 2030.
- In July 2022, Mojang Studios announced that NFTs would not be permitted in Minecraft, saying that they went against the game's "values of creative inclusion and playing together".

==== Music and film ====
NFTs have been proposed for use within the film-industry as a way to tokenize movie-scenes and sell them as collectibles in the form of NFTs. Artists involved in the entertainment-industry can seek royalties through NFTs. So far, NFTs have often been used in both the music- as well as the film-industry.

- In May 2018, 20th Century Fox partnered with Atom Tickets and released limited-edition Deadpool 2 digital posters to promote the film. They were available from OpenSea and the GFT exchange.
- In March 2021, Adam Benzine's 2015 documentary Claude Lanzmann: Spectres of the Shoah became the first motion picture and documentary film to be auctioned as an NFT.
- Other examples of NFTs being used in the film-industry include a collection of NFT-artworks for Godzilla vs. Kong, the release of both Kevin Smith's horror-movie KillRoy Was Here, and the 2021 film Zero Contact as NFTs in 2021.
- In September 2021, Shakira released an NFT collection named La Caldera, which features four pieces each with animated digital art and an audio piece produced by Shakira.
- In November 2021, film director Quentin Tarantino released seven NFTs based on uncut scenes of Pulp Fiction. Miramax subsequently filed a lawsuit claiming that their film rights were violated and that the original 1993 contract with Tarantino gave them the right to mint NFTs in relation to Pulp Fiction.
- In August 2022, Muse released album Will of the People as 1,000 NFTs; it became the first album for which NFT sales would qualify for the UK and Australian charts.

By February 2021, NFTs accounted for US$25 million of revenue generated through the sale of artwork and songs as NFTs. On February 28, 2021, electronic dance musician 3lau sold a collection of 33 NFTs for a total of US$11.7 million to commemorate the three-year anniversary of his Ultraviolet album. On March 3, 2021, an NFT was made to promote the Kings of Leon album When You See Yourself. Other musicians who have used NFTs include American rapper Lil Pump, Grimes, visual artist Shepard Fairey in collaboration with record producer Mike Dean, and rapper Eminem.

A paper presented at the 40th International Conference on Information Systems in Munich in 2019 suggested using NFTs as tickets for different types of events. This would enable organizers of the respective events or artists performing there to receive royalties on the resale of each ticket.

==== Other associated files ====
- A number of internet memes have been associated with NFTs, which were minted and sold by their creators or by their subjects. Examples include Doge, an image of a Shiba Inu dog, as well as Charlie Bit My Finger, Nyan Cat, and Disaster Girl.
- Some virtual worlds, often marketed as metaverses, have incorporated NFTs as a means of trading virtual items and virtual real estate.
- Some pornographic works have been sold as NFTs, though hostility from NFT marketplaces towards pornographic material has presented significant drawbacks for creators. By using NFTs people engaged in this area of the entertainment-industry are able to publish their works without third-party platforms being able to delete them.
- The first credited political protest NFT ("Destruction of Nazi Monument Symbolizing Contemporary Lithuania") was a video filmed by Professor Stanislovas Tomas on April 8, 2019, and minted on March 29, 2021. In the video, Tomas uses a sledgehammer to destroy a state-sponsored Lithuanian plaque located on the Lithuanian Academy of Sciences honoring Nazi war criminal Jonas Noreika.
- In 2020, CryptoKitties developer Dapper Labs released the NBA TopShot project, which allowed the purchase of NFTs linked to basketball highlights. The project was built on top of the Flow blockchain.
- In March 2021 an NFT of Twitter founder Jack Dorsey's first-ever tweet sold for $2.9 million. The same NFT was listed for sale in 2022 at $48 million, but only achieved a top bid of $280.
- On December 15, 2022, Donald Trump, former president of the United States, announced a line of NFTs featuring images of himself for $99 each. It was reported that he made between $100,001 and $1 million from the scheme.
- In April 2023, a group visited the British Museum to take extensive 3D photographs of the Rosetta Stone so it could be recreated as an NFT.

=== Use cases of NFTs in science and medicine ===
NFTs have been proposed for purposes related to scientific and medical purposes. Suggestions include turning patient data into NFTs, tracking supply chains and minting patents as NFTs.

The monetary aspect of the sale of NFTs has been used by academic institutions to finance research projects.

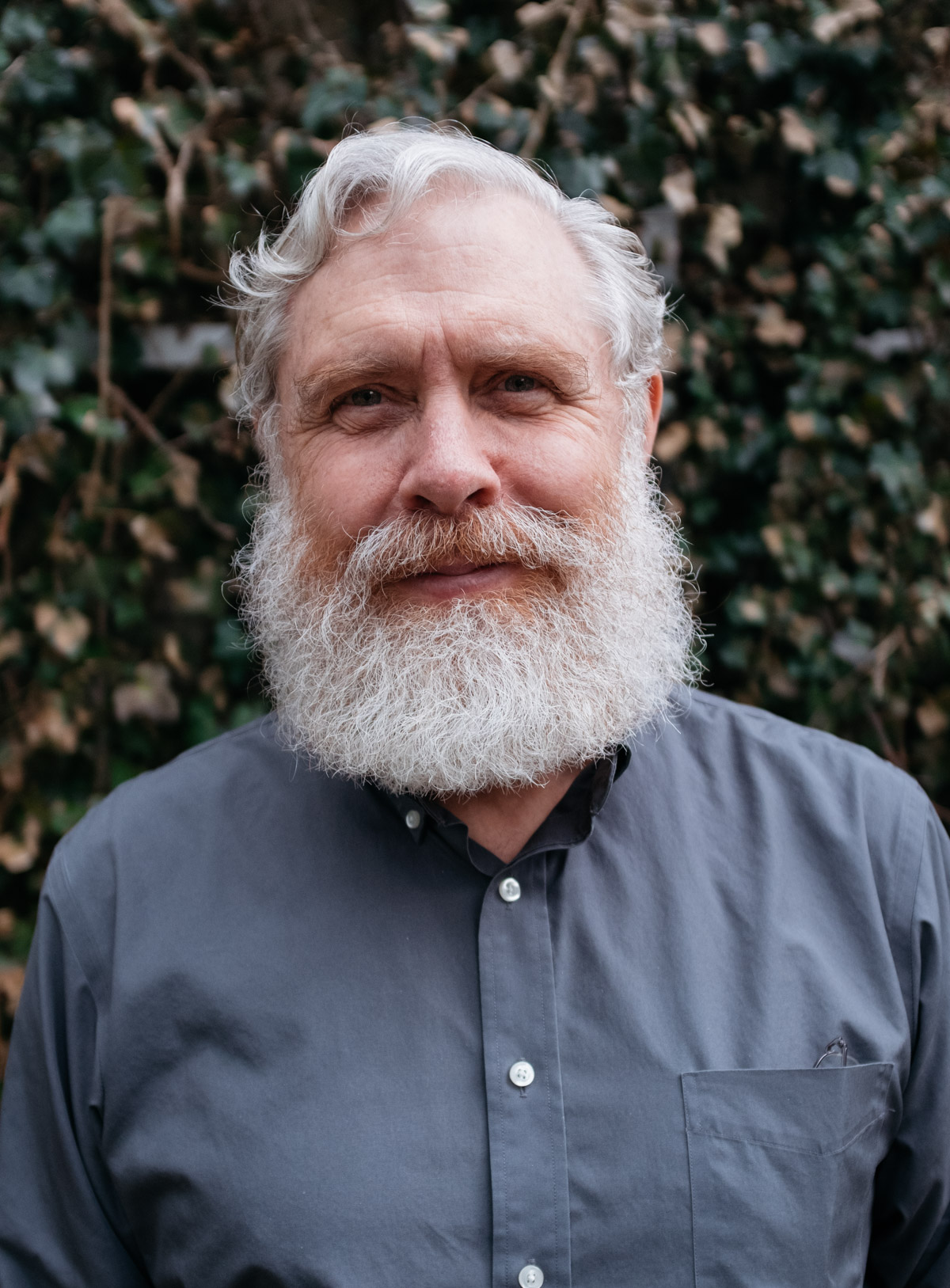
George M. Church sold NFTs of an "artistic representation" of his genome and likeness in 2022.

- The University of California, Berkeley announced in May 2021 its intention to auction NFTs of two patents of inventions for which the creators had received a Nobel Prize: the patents for CRISPR gene editing and cancer immunotherapy. The university would, however, retain ownership of the patents. 85% of funds gathered through the sale of the collection were to be used to finance research. The collection included handwritten notices and faxes by James Allison and was named The Fourth Pillar. It sold in June 2022 for 22 Ether, about US$54,000 at the time.
- George Church, a US geneticist, announced his intention to sell his DNA via NFTs and use the profits to finance research conducted by Nebula Genomics. In June 2022, 20 NFTs with his likeness were published instead of the originally planned NFTs of his DNA due to the market conditions at the time. Despite mixed reactions, the project is considered to be part of an effort to use the genetic data of 15,000 individuals to support genetic research. By using NFTs the project wants to ensure that the users submitting their genetic data are able to receive direct payment for their contributions. Several other companies have been involved in similar and often criticized efforts to use blockchain-based genetic data in order to guarantee users more control over their data and enable them to receive direct financial compensation whenever their data is being sold.
- Molecule Protocol, a project based in Switzerland, is trying to use NFTs to digitize the intellectual copyright of individual scientists and research teams to finance research. The project's whitepaper explains the aim is to represent the copyright of scientific papers as NFTs and enable their trade between researchers and investors on a future marketplace. The project was able to raise US$12 million in seed money in July 2022. A similar approach has been announced by RMDS Lab.

=== Speculation ===
NFTs representing digital collectables and artworks are a speculative asset. The NFT buying surge was called an economic bubble by experts, who also compared it to the Dot-com bubble. In March 2021 Mike Winkelmann called NFTs an "irrational exuberance bubble". By mid-April 2021, demand subsided, causing prices to fall significantly. Financial theorist William J. Bernstein compared the NFT market to 17th-century tulip mania, saying any speculative bubble requires a technological advance for people to "get excited about", with part of that enthusiasm coming from the extreme predictions being made about the product. For regulatory policymakers, NFTs have exacerbated challenges such as speculation, fraud, and high volatility.

=== Money laundering ===
NFTs, as with other blockchain securities and with traditional art sales, can potentially be used for money laundering. NFTs can be used for wash trading by creating several wallets for one individual, generating several fictitious sales and consequently selling the respective NFT to a third party. According to a report by Chainalysis these types of wash trades are becoming popular among money launderers because of the largely anonymous nature of transactions on NFT marketplaces. Looksrare, created in early 2022, came to be known for the large sums generated through the sale of NFTs in its earliest days, amounting to US$400,000,000 a day. These large sums were generated in large part through wash trading. The Royal United Services Institute said that any risks in relation to money laundering through NFTs could be mitigated through the use of "KYC best practices, strong cyber security measures and a stolen art registry (...) without restricting the growth of this new market".

Auction platforms for NFTs may face regulatory pressure to comply with anti-money laundering legislation. Gou Wenjun, the director of a monitoring centre for the People's Bank of China, said that NFTs could "easily become money-laundering tools". He pointed to unlawful exploitation of cryptographic technologies and said that illicit actors often presented themselves as innovators in financial technology.

A 2022 study from the United States Treasury assessed that there was "some evidence of money laundering risk in the high-value art market", including through "the emerging digital art market, such as the use of non-fungible tokens (NFTs)". The study considered how NFT transactions may be a simpler option for laundering money through art by avoiding the transportation or insurance complications in trading physical art. Several NFT exchanges were labeled as virtual asset service providers that may be subject to Financial Crimes Enforcement Network regulations. In March 2022, two people were charged for the execution of a million-dollar NFT scheme through wire fraud.

The European Commission announced in July 2022 that it was planning to draw up regulations to combat money laundering by 2024.

=== Other uses ===
- In 2019, Nike patented a system called CryptoKicks that would use NFTs to verify the authenticity of its physical products and would give a virtual version of the shoe to the customer.
- Certain NFT releases have also added exclusivity to the NFT utility, including access to private online clubs.
- Different academic work and practical applications suggest to use NFTs to license software and to transfer source code copyright ownership via NFTs.

== Standards in blockchains ==
Several blockchains have added support for NFTs since Ethereum created its ERC-721 standard.

ERC-721 is an "inheritable" smart contract standard, which means that developers can create contracts by copying from a reference implementation. ERC-721 provides core methods that allow tracking the owner of a unique identifier, as well as a way for the owner to transfer the asset to others. Another standard, ERC-1155, offers "semi-fungibility" whereby a token represents a class of interchangeable assets.

== Issues and criticisms ==
=== Unenforceability of content ownership ===
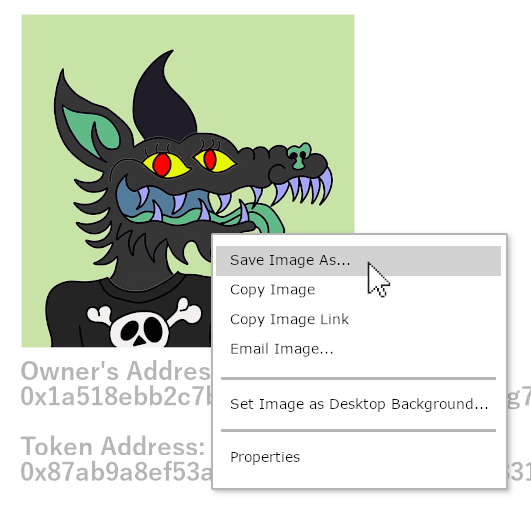
As an image on the web, the digital art linked to a non-fungible token may be saved like any other picture file.

It has become well known that an NFT image can be copied or saved from a web browser by using a right click menu to download the referenced image. NFT supporters disparage this duplication of NFT artwork as a "right-clicker mentality". One collector quoted by Vice compared the value of a purchased NFT (in contrast to an unpurchased copy of the underlying asset) to that of a status symbol "to show off that they can afford to pay that much".

The "right-clicker mentality" phrase spread virally after its introduction, particularly among those who were critical of the NFT marketplace and who appropriated the term to flaunt their ability to capture digital art backed by NFT with ease. This criticism was promoted by Australian programmer Geoffrey Huntley who created "The NFT Bay", modeled after The Pirate Bay. The NFT Bay advertised a torrent file purported to contain 19 terabytes of digital art NFT images. Huntley compared his work to an art project from Pauline Pantsdown and hoped the site would help educate users on what NFTs are and are not.

=== Storage off-chain ===
NFTs that represent digital art generally do not store the associated artwork file on the blockchain due to the large size of such a file and the limited processing speed of blockchains. Such a token functions like a certificate of ownership, with a web address that points to the piece of art in question; this however makes the art itself vulnerable to link rot.

=== Environmental concerns ===
NFT purchases and sales have been enabled by the high energy usage, and consequent greenhouse gas emissions, associated with some kinds of blockchain transactions. Though all forms of Ethereum transactions have had an impact on the environment, the direct impact of these transaction has also depended on the size of the transaction. The proof-of-work protocol required to regulate and verify blockchain transactions on networks (including Ethereum until 2022) consumes a large amount of electricity. To estimate the carbon footprint of a given NFT transaction requires a variety of assumptions or estimations about the manner in which that transaction is set up on the blockchain, the economic behavior of blockchain miners (and the energy demands of their mining equipment), and the amount of renewable energy being used on these networks. There are also conceptual questions, such as whether the carbon footprint estimate for an NFT purchase should incorporate some portion of the ongoing energy demand of the underlying network, or just the marginal impact of that particular purchase. An analogy might be the carbon footprint associated with an additional passenger on a given airline flight.

In 2022, Ethereum cut its energy usage by 99.99 percent by switching to proof of stake. Other approaches to reducing electricity include the use of off-chain transactions as part of minting an NFT. Some NFT markets have offered the option of buying carbon offsets when making NFT purchases, although the environmental benefits of this have been questioned. In some instances, NFT artists have decided against selling some of their own work to limit carbon emission contributions.

=== Artist and buyer fees ===
Sales platforms charge artists and buyers fees for minting, listing, claiming, and secondary sales. Analysis of NFT markets in March 2021, in the immediate aftermath of Beeple's "Everydays: the First 5000 Days" selling for US$69.3 million, found that most NFT artworks were selling for less than US$200, with a third selling for less than US$100. Those selling NFTs below $100 were paying platform fees between 72.5% and 157.5% of that amount. On average the fees make up 100.5% of the price, meaning that such artists were on average paying more money in fees than they were making in sales.

=== Plagiarism and fraud ===
There have been cases of artists and creators having their work sold by others as an NFT without permission. After the artist Qing Han died in 2020, her identity was assumed by a fraudster and a number of her works became available for purchase as NFTs. Similarly, a seller posing as Banksy succeeded in selling an NFT supposedly made by the artist for $336,000 in 2021; the seller refunded the money after the case drew media attention.

==== Voiceverse NFT plagiarism scandal ====
In January 2022, the first instance of speech synthesis NFT plagiarism and fraud occurred when an NFT company called Voiceverse was discovered to have stolen content from 15.ai, a non-commercial text-to-speech project. Log files revealed that Voiceverse had generated voice lines of Twilight Sparkle and Rainbow Dash using 15.ai, pitched them up to sound unrecognizable, promoted them as the byproduct of their own technology, and sold them as NFTs without permission. When confronted, Voiceverse stated that someone on their marketing team had used the voice without proper attribution. The developer of 15.ai, who had previously stated their opposition to NFTs a month prior to the incident, responded with a tweet saying "Go fuck yourself," which went viral and gained widespread support.

The anonymity associated with NFTs and the ease with which they can be forged make it difficult to pursue legal action against NFT plagiarists.

In February 2023, artist Mason Rothschild was ordered to pay $133,000 in damages to Hermès by a New York court, after a jury sided with the copyright holder, for his 2021 digital depictions of the brand's Birkin handbag.

Some NFT marketplaces responded to cases of plagiarism by creating "takedown teams" to respond to artist complaints. The NFT marketplace OpenSea has rules against plagiarism and deepfakes (non-consensual intimate imagery). Some artists criticized OpenSea's efforts, saying they are slow to respond to takedown requests and that artists are subject to support scams from users who claim to be representatives of the platform. Others argue that there is no market incentive for NFT marketplaces to crack down on plagiarism.

- A process known as "sleepminting" allows a fraudster to mint an NFT in an artist's wallet and transfer it back to their own account without the artist becoming aware. This allowed a white hat hacker to mint a fraudulent NFT that had seemingly originated from the wallet of the artist Beeple.
- Plagiarism concerns led the art website DeviantArt to create an algorithm that compares user art posted on the DeviantArt website against art on popular NFT marketplaces. If the algorithm identifies art that is similar, it notifies and instructs the author how they can contact NFT marketplaces to request that they take down their plagiarized work.
- The BBC reported a case of insider trading when an employee of the NFT marketplace OpenSea bought specific NFTs before they were launched, with prior knowledge those NFTs would be promoted on the company's home page. NFT trading is an unregulated market in which there is no legal recourse for such abuses.
- When Adobe announced they were adding NFT support to their graphics editor Photoshop, the company proposed creating an InterPlanetary File System database as an alternative means of establishing authenticity for digital works.
- The price paid for specific NFTs and the sales volume of a particular NFT author may be artificially inflated by wash trading, which is prevalent due to a lack of government regulation on NFTs.

=== Security ===
In January 2022, it was reported that some NFTs were being exploited by sellers to unknowingly gather users' IP addresses. The "exploit" works via the off-chain nature of NFT, as the user's computer automatically follows a web address in the NFT to display the content. The server at the address can then log the IP address and, in some cases, dynamically alter the returned content to show the result. OpenSea has a particular vulnerability to this loophole because it allows HTML files to be linked.

=== Pyramid/Ponzi scheme claims ===
Critics compare the structure of the NFT market to a pyramid or Ponzi scheme, in which early adopters profit at the expense of those buying in later. In June 2022, Bill Gates stated his belief that NFTs are "100% based on greater fool theory".

=== "Rug pull" exit scams ===
A "rug pull" is a scam, similar to an exit scam or a pump and dump scheme, in which the developers of an NFT or other blockchain project hype the value of a project to pump up the price of the NFT and then suddenly sell all their tokens to lock in massive profits or otherwise abandon the project while removing liquidity, permanently destroying the value of the project and leaving investors without their initial investment.

== See also ==
- Certificate of authenticity
- Decentralized autonomous organization
- Deed
- Title (property)
- Web3
