= James Earl Jones on screen and stage =

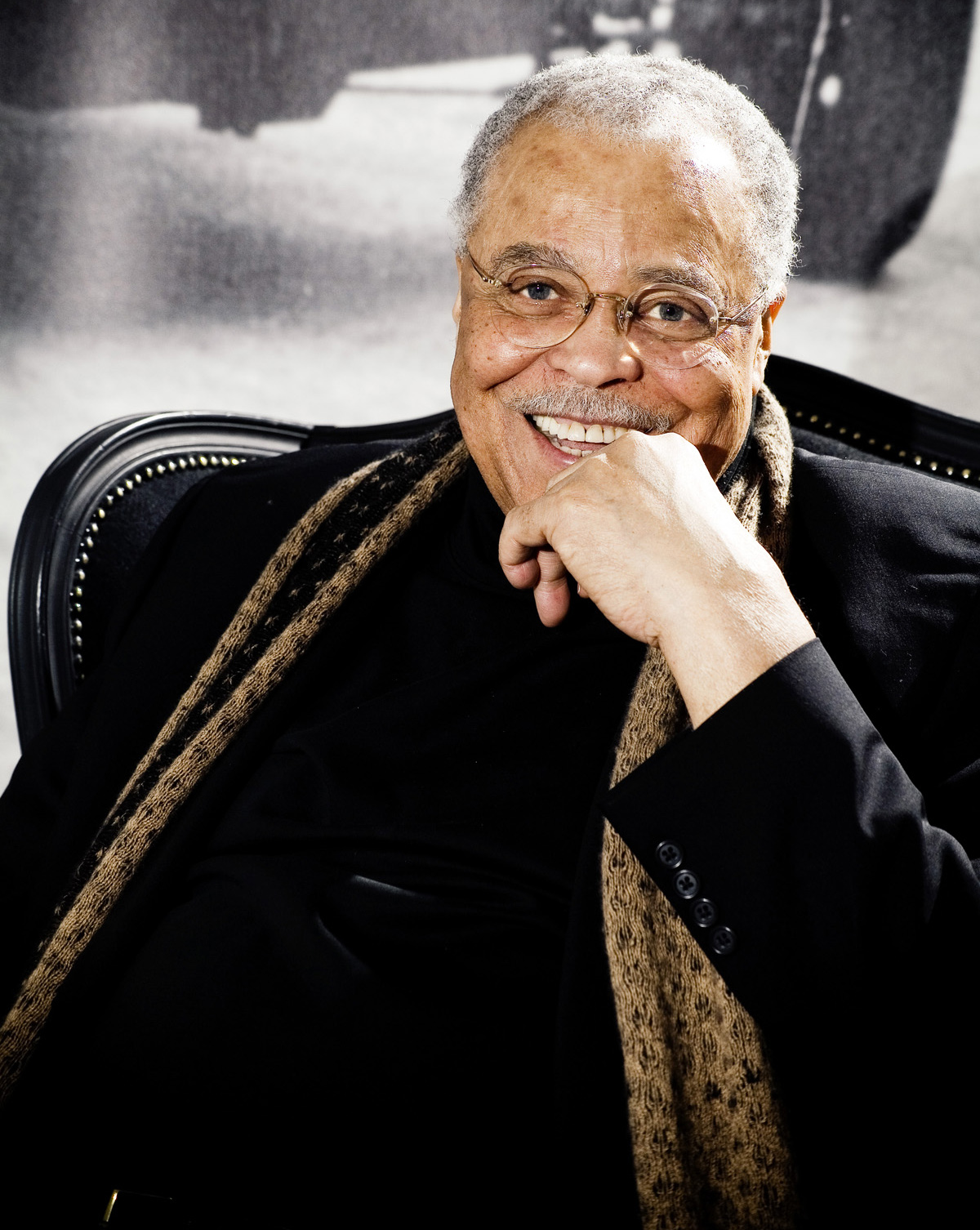
Jones in 2010

American actor James Earl Jones had an extensive career in various film, television, and theater. He started out in film by appearing in the 1964 political satire film Dr. Strangelove as Lt. Lothar Zogg. He then went on to star in the 1970 film The Great White Hope as Jack Jefferson, a role he first played in the Broadway production of the same name. The film role earned him two Golden Globe nominations, one for Best Actor and winning one for New Star of the Year. He also received an Academy Award nomination for Best Actor. His other work in the 1970s included playing the title character in Malcolm X (1972), Johnny Williams in The River Niger (1976), Nick Debrett in Swashbuckler (1976), Malcolm X again in The Greatest (1977), and The Bushido Blade with Richard Boone (1979).

Jones had notably voiced the antagonist Darth Vader in the Star Wars franchise, first in the original trilogy films—Star Wars (1977), The Empire Strikes Back (1980), Return of the Jedi (1983) then again in the third installment of the prequel trilogy, Revenge of the Sith, first installment of the Star Wars anthology series—Rogue One (2016), and the third installment of the sequel trilogy, The Rise of Skywalker. He was also notable for voicing the Disney character Mufasa, first in the 1994 animated film The Lion King, its sequel The Lion King II: Simba's Pride (1998), and the 2019 photorealistic computer-animated remake of the same name.

In the 1980s, Jones had co-starring roles in the films Conan the Barbarian with Arnold Schwarzenegger (1982), Soul Man with C. Thomas Howell (1986), Allan Quatermain and the Lost City of Gold with Richard Chamberlain (1987), Matewan with Chris Cooper (1987), Coming to America with Eddie Murphy (1988) and its sequel, Coming 2 America (2021), and Field of Dreams with Kevin Costner (1989). In 1990, Jones was first cast as the role of Admiral James Greer in the action thriller film The Hunt for Red October, a film based on Tom Clancy's novel of the same name. He reprised the role again in Patriot Games (1992) and Clear and Present Danger (1994), both films he co-starred with Harrison Ford, who was also in the first three Star Wars franchise films. He also played Mr. Mertle in The Sandlot (1993), a role he reprised again in The Sandlot 2 (2005). His later roles include Gimme Shelter with Rosario Dawson (2013), and The Angriest Man in Brooklyn with Robin Williams (2014), one of Williams' last films before his death. In 2008 and 2011, Jones won the Screen Actors Guild Life Achievement Award and Academy Honorary Award respectively for his career in film.

Jones' television work included playing Woodrow Paris in the series Paris between 1979 and 1980. He voiced various characters on the animated series The Simpsons in three separate seasons (1990, 1994, 1998). He then was cast as Gabriel Bird, the lead role in the series Gabriel's Fire which aired from 1990 to 1991. For that role, he won the Primetime Emmy Award for Outstanding Lead Actor in a Drama Series and was nominated for his fourth Golden Globe Award, this time for Best Actor in a Television Series Drama. He played Bird again in the series Pros and Cons, which ran from 1991 to 1992; that earned him his fifth and final Golden Globe Award for Best Actor in a Television Series Drama. He then had small appearances in the series Law & Order (1993), Picket Fences (1994), Mad About You (1997), Touched by an Angel (1997), Frasier (1997). His role in Picket Fences earned him another Primetime Emmy Award nomination, one for Outstanding Guest Actor in a Drama Series. His later television work includes small roles in Everwood (2003–2004), Two and a Half Men (2008), House (2009), and The Big Bang Theory (2014).

Jones' theater work included numerous Broadway plays, including: Sunrise at Campobello (1958–1959), Danton's Death (1965), The Iceman Cometh (1973–1974), Of Mice and Men (1974–1975), Othello (1982), On Golden Pond (2005), Cat on a Hot Tin Roof (2008) and You Can't Take It with You (2014–2015). He was also in various off Broadway productions and Shakespeare stage adaptations such as The Merchant of Venice (1962), The Winter's Tale (1963), Othello (1964–1965), Coriolanus (1965), Hamlet (1972), and King Lear (1973). His roles in The Great White Hope (1969) and Fences (1987) earned him two Tony Awards, both for Best Leading Actor in a Play.

== Film ==
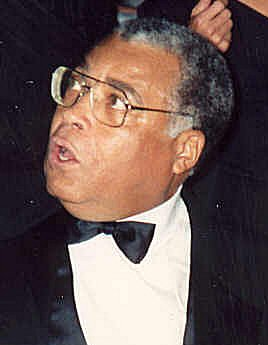
Jones at the Governor's Ball after the 43rd Annual Emmy Awards in August 1991

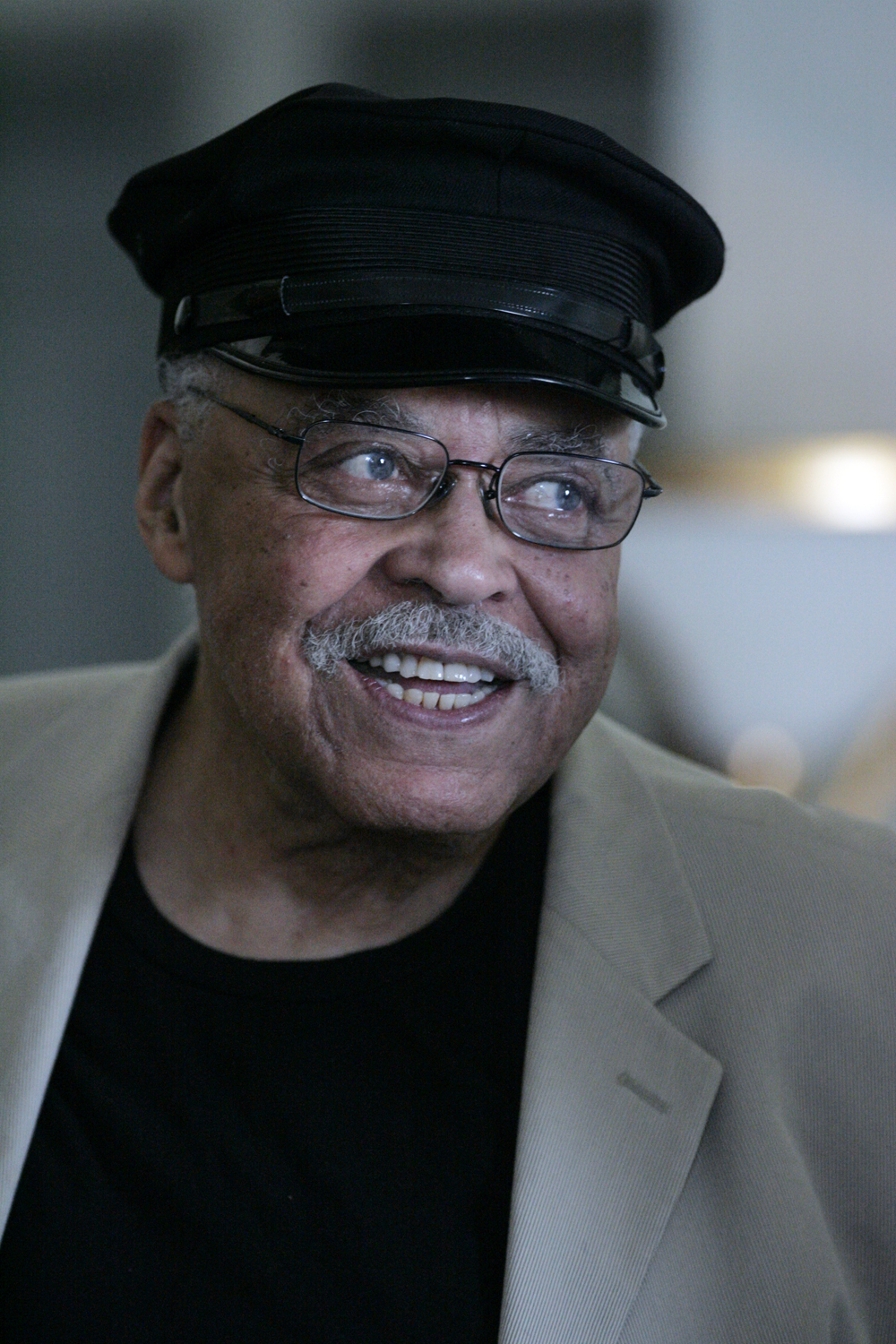
Jones rehearsing for the Australian tour of the stage production Driving Miss Daisy in January 2013

Year	Title	Role	Notes	Ref(s)
1964	Dr. Strangelove	Lt. Lothar Zogg		
1967	The Comedians	Dr. Georges Magiot		
1967	The Comedians in Africa	Himself	Short film	
1970	End of the Road	Doctor D		
1970	The Great White Hope	Jack Jefferson	Nominated — Academy Award for Best Actor	
1972	The Man	Douglass Dilman		
1974	Claudine	Rupert "Roop" B. Marshall		
1975	Deadly Hero	Rabbit Shazam		
1976	The River Niger	Johnny Williams		
1976	The Bingo Long Traveling All-Stars & Motor Kings	Leon Carter		
1976	Swashbuckler	Nick Debrett		
1977	The Greatest	Malcolm X		
1977	Star Wars	Darth Vader	Voice role, originally uncredited (credited in reissues)	
1977	Exorcist II: The Heretic	Older Kokumo		
1977	The Last Remake of Beau Geste	Sheikh		
1977	A Piece of the Action	Joshua Burke		
1979	The Bushido Blade	Harpooner		
1980	The Empire Strikes Back	Darth Vader	Voice role, originally uncredited (credited in reissues)	
1982	The Flight of Dragons	Ommadon	Voice role	
1982	Conan the Barbarian	Thulsa Doom		
1982	Blood Tide	Frye	aka Demon Island and The Red Tide	
1983	Return of the Jedi	Darth Vader	Voice role	
1985	City Limits	Albert		
1986	Soul Man	Professor Banks		
1986	Allan Quatermain and the Lost City of Gold	Umslopogaas		
1987	Gardens of Stone	Sgt. Maj. "Goody" Nelson		
1987	My Little Girl	Ike Bailey		
1987	Pinocchio and the Emperor of the Night	Emperor of the Night	Voice role	
1987	Matewan	Few Clothes		
1988	Coming to America	King Jaffe Joffer		
1989	Three Fugitives	Detective Movan Dugan		
1989	Field of Dreams	Terence Mann		
1989	Best of the Best	Frank Couzo		
1990	Convicts	Ben Johnson		
1990	The Hunt for Red October	Vice-Admiral James Greer		
1990	The Ambulance	Lt. Spencer		
1990	Grim Prairie Tales	Morrison		
1991	Scorchers	Bear		
1991	True Identity	Himself		
1992	Patriot Games	Admiral James Greer		
1992	Sneakers	NSA Agent Bernard Abbott		
1993	Dreamrider	William Perry		
1993	Sommersby	Judge Barry Conrad Isaacs		
1993	The Sandlot	Mr. Mertle		
1993	Excessive Force	Jake		
1993	The Meteor Man	Earnest Moses		
1994	Naked Gun 33 1/3: The Final Insult	Himself	Cameo	
1994	Clean Slate	Dolby		
1994	The Lion King	Mufasa	Voice role	
1994	Clear and Present Danger	Admiral James Greer		
1995	Indiana Jones Adventure: Temple of the Forbidden Eye	Mara	Voice role, Theme park dark ride	
1995	Jefferson in Paris	Madison Hemings		
1995	Cry, the Beloved Country	Rev. Stephen Kumalo		
1996	A Family Thing	Ray Murdock		
1996	Good Luck	James Bing		
1997	Casper: A Spirited Beginning	Kibosh	Voice, direct-to-video	
1997	Gang Related	Arthur Baylor		
1998	Primary Colors	CNN Voiceover	Voice cameo	
1998	The Lion King II: Simba's Pride	Mufasa	Voice role, direct-to-video	
1999	Our Friend, Martin	Martin Luther King, Sr.	Voice role, direct-to-video	
1999	On the Q.T.	Leo		
1999	Undercover Angel	The Judge		
1999	The Annihilation of Fish	Fish		
1999	Fantasia 2000	Himself		
2001	Finder's Fee	Avery Phillips		
2005	Robots	Voice Box at Hardware Store	Voice role	
2005	The Sandlot 2	Mr. Morris Mertle	Direct-to-video	
2005	Star Wars: Episode III – Revenge of the Sith	Darth Vader	Voice role	
2006	The Benchwarmers	Darth Vader	Voice cameo	
2006	Click	Narrator of Michael's Past / Himself	Uncredited voice cameo	
2006	Scary Movie 4	Narrator / Himself	Uncredited cameo	
2008	Welcome Home Roscoe Jenkins	Roscoe Jenkins, Sr.		
2009	Quantum Quest: A Cassini Space Odyssey	The Professor, The Admiral	Voice role	
2009	Jack and the Beanstalk	The Giant	Voice role	
2011	Star Tours – The Adventures Continue	Darth Vader	Voice role, short film	
2013	Gimme Shelter	Frank McCarthy		
2014	The Angriest Man in Brooklyn	Ruben		
2014	Driving Miss Daisy	Hoke Coleburn	Theatrical release of stage production	
2016	Rogue One	Darth Vader	Voice role	
2018	Warning Shot	Pendleton		
2019	The Lion King	Mufasa	Voice role	
2019	Star Wars: The Rise of Skywalker	Palpatine impersonating Darth Vader	Voice cameo	
2021	Coming 2 America	King Jaffe Joffer	Final film role	
2024	Mufasa: The Lion King	Adult Mufasa	Posthumous release, Dedicated to his Memory	

== Television series ==
Year	Title	Role	Notes	Ref(s)
1962	The Defenders	Guest role		
1963	East Side/West Side	Joe Goodwin	Episode: "Who Do You Kill?"	
1963	Channing	Guest role		
1966	Dr. Kildare	Guest role		
1966	As the World Turns	Dr. Jerry Turner		
1969	N.Y.P.D.	Candy Lateen	2 episodes	
1969	Sesame Street	Himself	2 episodes	
1974	NBC Children's Theater	Himself	Episode: "Super Plastic Elastic Goggles"	
1977	Jesus of Nazareth	Balthazar	Episode: "Part 1"	
1978	Sesame Street	Movie Star	Episode: 1148	
1979	Roots: The Next Generations	Alex Haley	Episode: "1.7"	
1979–80	Paris	Woodrow Paris	13 episodes	
1985	The Atlanta Child Murders	Major Walker	2 episodes	
1985	Me and Mom	Lou Garfield	6 episodes	
1986	Faerie Tale Theatre	Genie of the Lamp, Genie of the Ring	Episode: "Aladdin and His Wonderful Lamp"	
1987	Highway to Heaven	Gabe Wilson	1 episode: "A Song of Songs"	
1987; 1990–92	Square One Television	Announcer, Chief Thad Greene	4 episodes	
1987–91	Mathnet	Announcer, Chief Thad Greene	5 episodes	
1988–89	L.A. Law	Lee Atkins	2 episodes	
1989	Saturday Night with Connie Chung	Vernon Johns	Episode: "God's Bad Boy"	
1989–92	Long Ago and Far Away	Himself/host	35 episodes	
1990, 1994, 1998	The Simpsons	Moving Man, Serak the Preparer, Narrator, Maggie Simpson	Voice, 3 episodes	
1990–91	Gabriel's Fire	Gabriel Bird	22 episodes	
1991–92	Pros and Cons	Gabriel Bird	12 episodes	
1992	Garfield and Friends	Diablo	Voice, episode: "Ghost of a Chance"	
1993	ABC Weekend Special		Episode: "The Parsley Garden"	
1993	Law & Order	Horace McCoy	Episode: "Profile"	
1993	American Playhouse	Old Man Taylor	Episode: "Hallelujah"	
1994	Picket Fences	Bryant Thomas	Episode: "System Down"	
1994	Lois & Clark: The New Adventures of Superman	Franklin Stern	Episode: "The House of Luthor"	
1995	Happily Ever After: Fairy Tales for Every Child	King Dakkar	Voice, episode: "The Valiant Little Tailor"	
1995	Signs and Wonders	Diamond	4 episodes	
1995	Under One Roof	Neb Langston	6 episodes	
1997	Mad About You	Himself	Episode: "Chicken Man"	
1997	The Magic School Bus	James Wright	Voice, episode: "In the City"	
1997	Touched by an Angel	Angel of Angels	Episode: "Clipped Wings"	
1997	Frasier	Norman Royster	Episode: "Roz's Krantz & Gouldenstein Are Dead"	
1997	Stargate SG-1	Unas	Episode: "Thor's Hammer"	
1997	Homicide: Life on the Street	Felix Wilson	3 episodes	
1998	Merlin	Mountain King	Voice, 3 episodes	
1998	Recess	Santa Claus	Voice, episode: "Yes, Mikey, Santa Does Shave"	
2003	Will & Grace	Himself	Episode: "Me and Mr. Jones"	
2003–04	Everwood	Will Cleveland	3 episodes	
2004	According to Jim	Royal Flush XP Toilet	Voice, episode: "The Toilet"	
2004	Sesame Street	Himself	Episode: 4077	
2008	Two and a Half Men	Himself	Episode: "The Devil's Lube"	
2009	House	Dibala	Episode: "The Tyrant"	
2010	SpongeBob SquarePants	Keeper of the Hornet Forest	Episode: "Squidward in Clarinetland"	
2014	The Big Bang Theory	Himself	Episode: "The Convention Conundrum"	
2014–16	Star Wars Rebels	Darth Vader	Voice, 5 episodes	
2015	Agent X	Chief Justice Caleb Thorne	2 episodes	
2022	Obi-Wan Kenobi	Darth Vader	Voice (generated via Respeecher); 4 episodes; Final TV role	

== Television films ==
Year	Title	Role	Ref(s)
1974	The Cay	Timothy	
1975	The UFO Incident	Barney Hill	
1977	The Greatest Thing That Almost Happened	Morris Bird, Jr.	
1978	Star Wars Holiday Special	Darth Vader	
1980	Guyana Tragedy: The Story of Jim Jones	Father Divine	
1984	The Vegas Strip War	Jack Madrid	
1990	By Dawn's Early Light	Alice	
1990	Heat Wave	Junius Johnson	
1993	Percy & Thunder	Percy	
1994	Confessions: Two Faces of Evil	Charles Lloyd	
1994	The Road to Freedom: The Vernon Johns Story	Vernon Johns	
1994	Twilight Zone: Rod Serling's Lost Classics	Host	
1994	Bah, Humbug!	Narrator, Ebenezer Scrooge	
1995	People: A Musical Celebration	The Storyteller	
1996	Rebound: The Legend of Earl "The Goat" Manigault	Dr. McDuffie	
1996	Timepiece	Lawrence	
1997	Alone	Grey	
1997	What the Deaf Man Heard	Archibald Thacker	
1997	The Second Civil War	Jim Kalla	
1999	Santa and Pete	Grandpa Nicholas	
1999	Summer's End	Dr. William Blakely	
2001	The Feast of All Saints	Older Marcel	
2005	The Reading Room	William	
2009	The Magic 7	5-Toe (voice)	
2015	The Lion Guard: Return of the Roar	Mufasa (voice)	

== Narrator ==
Year	Title	Notes	Ref(s)
1962	Monitor	Television newsmagazine; narration and voice contributions	
1962	Look Up and Live	Public-affairs program; narration and dramatized readings	
1970	King: A Filmed Record... Montgomery to Memphis	Documentary	
1972	Malcolm X	Documentary	
1980	There Was Always Sun Shining Someplace: Life in the Negro Baseball Leagues	Documentary	
1984	Why Mosquitoes Buzz in People’s Ears	Audio book	
1990	The Atlanta Campaign	Short film	
1992	Freddie as F.R.O.7	American dub	
1992	Lincoln	Television documentary	
1992	Ramayana: The Legend of Prince Rama	American dub	
1992	Second Coming	Short film	
1992	Shelley Duvall's Bedtime Stories	Segment "Millions of Cats"	
1993	The Complete Multimedia Bible	Video game	
1994	Africa: The Serengeti	Documentary	
1995	Judge Dredd	Uncredited	
1995	Who's in Rabbit's House?	Audio book	
1996	3^{rd} Rock from the Sun	Uncredited voice contribution	
2000	Antietam: A Documentary Drama	Documentary	
2001	Black Indians: An American Story	Documentary	
2002	Disney's American Legends	Video	
2004	Nine Dog Christmas	Video	
2006	The Trail of Tears: Cherokee Legacy	Documentary	
2007	Earth	Documentary	
2009	La Premiere	Short	

== Theatre ==
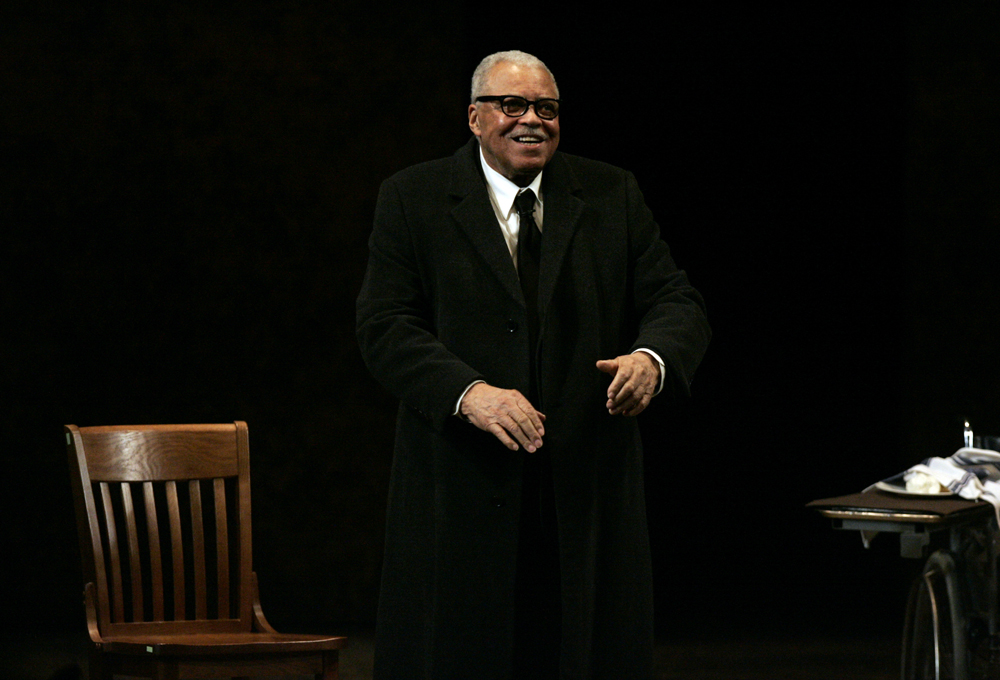
Jones performing Driving Miss Daisy in Sydney in March 2013

Year	Title	Role	Venue	Ref(s)
1958–59	Sunrise at Campobello	Edward	Cort Theatre	
1960	The Cool World	Harrison Thurston	Eugene O'Neill Theatre	
1961	Clandestine on the Morning Line	—N/a	Actors' Playhouse	
1961	The Apple	—N/a	The Living Theatre	
1961–64	The Blacks	Deodatus Village	St. Mark's Playhouse	
1962	The Merchant of Venice	Prince of Morocco	Delacorte Theater	
1962	P.S. 193	Mario Saccone	Writers Stage Theatre	
1963	The Love Nest	George Gulp	Writers Stage Theatre	
1963	The Winter's Tale	Camillo	Delacorte Theater	
1963	Next Time I'll Sing to You	Rudge	Phoenix Theatre	
1964	The Blood Knot	Zachariah Pieterson	Cricket Theatre	
1964–65	Othello	Othello	Martinique Theatre / Delacorte Theater	
1965	Baal	Ekart	Martinique Theatre	
1965	Coriolanus	Junius Brutus	Delacorte Theater	
1965	Troilus and Cressida	Ajax	Delacorte Theater	
1965	Danton's Death	—N/a	Vivian Beaumont Theater	
1966	A Hand Is on the Gate	—N/a	Longacre Theatre	
1968–70	The Great White Hope	Jack Jefferson	Alvin Theatre	
1970	Les Blancs	Tshembe Matoseh	Longacre Theatre	
1972	Hamlet	Claudius	Delacorte Theater	
1972–73	The Cherry Orchard	Lopahin	Joseph Papp Public Theater / Anspacher Theater	
1973	King Lear	Lear	Delacorte Theater	
1973–74	The Iceman Cometh	Theodore Hickman	Circle in the Square Theatre	
1974–75	Of Mice and Men	Lennie	Brooks Atkinson Theatre	
1978	Paul Robeson	Paul Robeson	Lunt-Fontanne Theatre / Booth Theatre	
1980–81	A Lesson From Aloes	Steve Daniels	Playhouse Theatre	
1982	Othello	Othello	Winter Garden Theatre	
1982–83	"Master Harold"...and the Boys	—N/a	Lyceum Theatre	
1987–88	Fences	Troy Maxson	46^{th} Street Theatre	
2005	On Golden Pond	Norman Thayer, Jr.	Cort Theatre	
2008–09	Cat on a Hot Tin Roof	Big Daddy	Broadhurst Theatre (2008); Novello Theatre (2009)	
2010–11, 2013	Driving Miss Daisy	Hoke Colburn	John Golden Theatre (2010–2011); Wyndham's Theatre (2011); Australian Tour (2013)	
2012	The Best Man	Former President Arthur "Artie" Hockstader	Gerald Schoenfeld Theatre	
2013	Much Ado about Nothing	Benedick	The Old Vic	
2014–15	You Can't Take It with You	Martin Vanderhof	Longacre Theatre	
2015–16	The Gin Game	Weller Martin	John Golden Theatre	
2017	The Night of the Iguana	Nonno	American Repertory Theater	

== Video games ==
Year	Title	Voice role	Notes	Ref(s)
1994	Tex Murphy: Under a Killing Moon	Great P.I. of the Universe		
1999	Command & Conquer: Tiberian Sun	General James Solomon	Live action cutscenes	
2000	The Lion King: Simba's Mighty Adventure	Mufasa		
2005	Kingdom Hearts II	Mufasa	Archived recordings from the original film	
2007	Lego Star Wars: The Complete Saga	Darth Vader		
2025	Fortnite Battle Royale	Darth Vader	Voice generated via ElevenLabs; Chapter 6: Galactic Battle	

== Sources ==
- Krafsur, Richard P. (1997). The American Film Institute Catalog of Motion Pictures Produced in the United States (1. California ed.). Berkeley, CA: University of California Press. ISBN 0520209702.
