= I Am Somebody =

I Am Somebody may refer to:

- I Am Somebody (2015 film), a Hong Kong drama film
- I Am Somebody (1970 film), a short political documentary
- "I Am – Somebody", a poem often recited by Reverend Jesse Jackson
- "I Am Somebody", a song by Bliss n Eso from the album Circus in the Sky
- "I Am Somebody", a song by DJ Mehdi featuring Chromeo
