= James Earl Jones =

American actor (1931–2024)

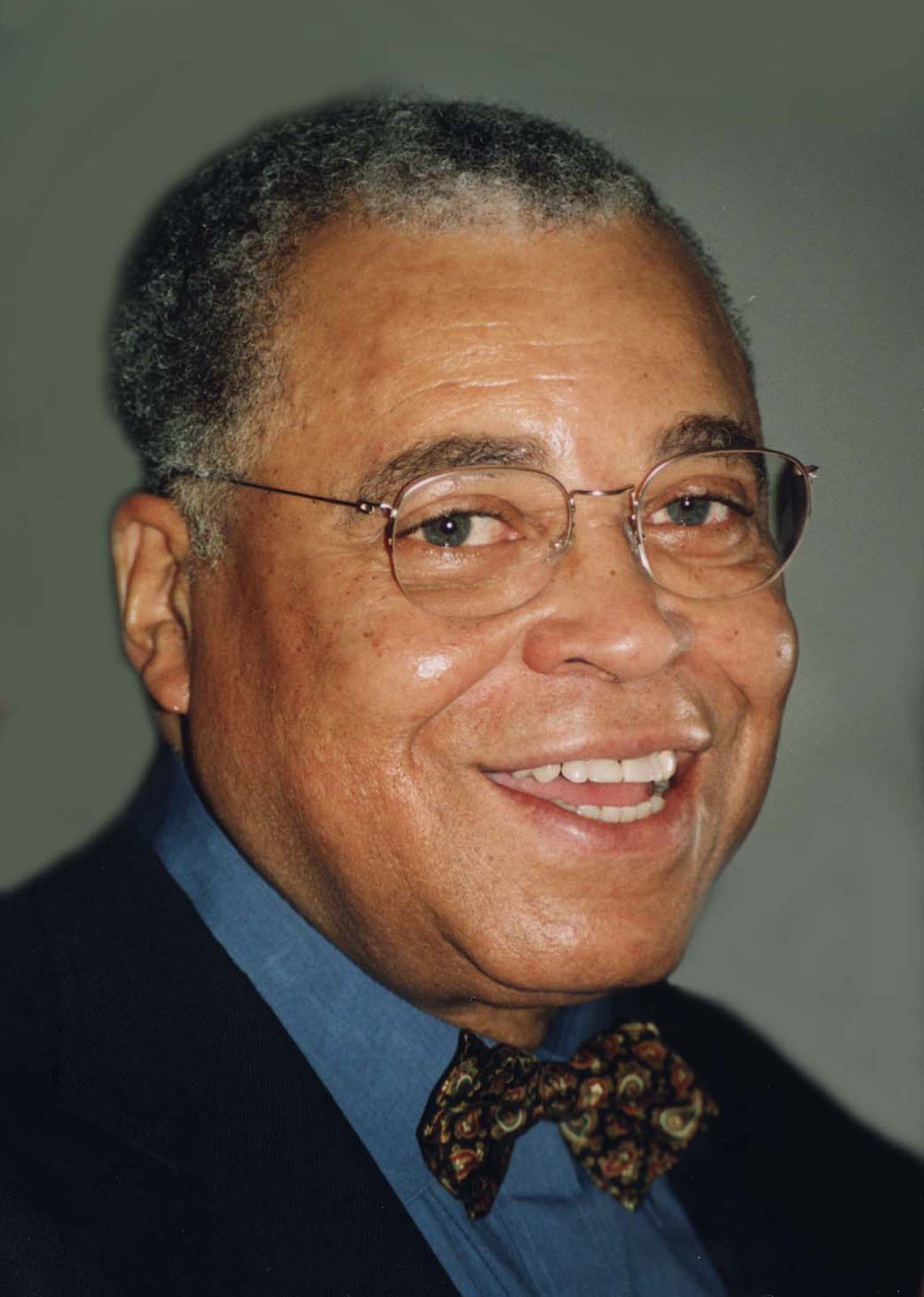
- Jones in 2001
- Born: January 17, 1931; Arkabutla, Mississippi, U.S.
- Died: September 9, 2024 (aged 93); Pawling, New York, U.S.
- Education: University of Michigan (BA)
- Occupation: Actor
- Years active: 1953–2022
- Works: Full list
- Spouses: Julienne Marie (m. 1968; div. 1972); Cecilia Hart (m. 1982; died 2016)
- Children: 1
- Father: Robert Earl Jones
- Awards: Full list
- James Earl Jones's voice Recorded December 2009 from the BBC Radio 4 program Front Row

James Earl Jones (January 17, 1931 – September 9, 2024) was an American actor. A pioneer for Black actors in the entertainment industry, he was acclaimed for his performances on stage and screen. Jones is one of the few performers to achieve the EGOT (Emmy, Grammy, Oscar, and Tony). He was inducted into the American Theater Hall of Fame in 1985 and was honored with the National Medal of Arts in 1992, the Kennedy Center Honor in 2002, the Screen Actors Guild Life Achievement Award in 2009, and the Academy Honorary Award in 2011.

Born in Arkabutla, Mississippi, Jones overcame a childhood stutter. A pre-med major in college, he served as an officer in the U.S. Army during the Korean War before pursuing a career in acting. His deep voice was praised as a "stirring basso profondo that has lent gravel and gravitas" to his projects. Jones made his Broadway debut in the play Sunrise at Campobello (1957) and gained fame starring in several productions with Shakespeare in the Park including Othello (1964), Coriolanus (1965), Hamlet (1972), and King Lear (1973).

For his roles on Broadway, Jones won two Tony Awards for Best Actor in a Play for playing a boxer in the Howard Sackler play The Great White Hope (1968) and a working class father in August Wilson's Fences (1987). He was nominated for other Tonys for his roles as part of an elderly couple in On Golden Pond (2005) and as a former president in The Best Man (2012). Jones acted in Cat on a Hot Tin Roof (2008), Driving Miss Daisy (2010–2011), You Can't Take It with You (2014), and The Gin Game (2015). He received a Special Tony Award for Lifetime Achievement in 2017.

On film, Jones made his acting debut in Stanley Kubrick's Dr. Strangelove (1964). He reprised his Broadway role in the film adaptation of The Great White Hope (1970), earning a nomination for the Academy Award for Best Actor. He gained international fame for his voice roles such as Darth Vader in the Star Wars franchise and Mufasa in The Lion King (1994). He acted in The Man (1972), Claudine (1974), Conan the Barbarian (1982), Matewan (1987), Coming to America (1988), Field of Dreams (1989), The Hunt for Red October (1990), Sneakers (1992), The Sandlot (1993), and Cry, the Beloved Country (1995).

== Early life and education ==
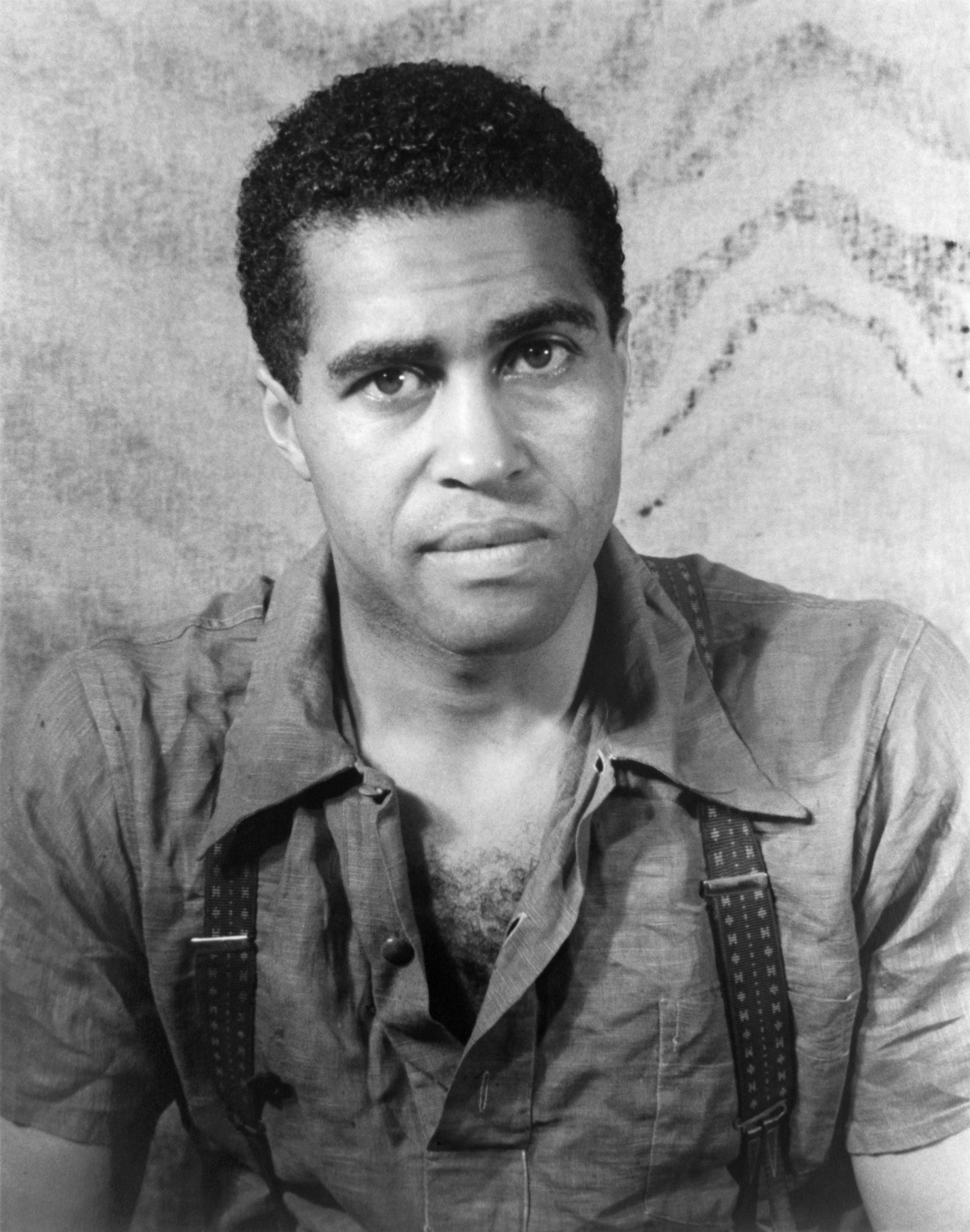
Jones's father, Robert Earl Jones, in promotional still for the Langston Hughes play Don't You Want to Be Free? (1938)

James Earl Jones was born in Arkabutla, Mississippi, on January 17, 1931, to Ruth (née Connolly; 1911–1986), a teacher and maid, and Robert Earl Jones (1910–2006), a boxer, butler, and chauffeur. His father left the family shortly after James Earl's birth and later became a stage and screen actor in New York and Hollywood. Jones and his father did not get to know each other until the 1950s, when they reconciled. He said in interviews that his parents were of mixed African-American, Irish, and Native American ancestry.

From the age of five, Jones was cared for by his maternal grandparents, John Henry and Maggie Connolly, on their farm in Dublin, Michigan; they had moved from Mississippi in the Great Migration. Jones found the transition to living with his grandparents in Michigan traumatic and developed a stutter so severe that he refused to speak. He said, "I was a stutterer. I couldn't talk. So my first year of school was my first mute year, and then those mute years continued until I got to high school." He credited his English teacher, Donald Crouch, who discovered he had a gift for writing poetry, with helping him end his silence. Crouch urged him to challenge his reluctance to speak through reading poetry aloud to the class.

In 1949, Jones graduated from Dickson Rural Agricultural School (now Brethren High School) in Brethren, Michigan, where he served as vice president of his class.

He attended the University of Michigan where he was initially a pre-med major. He joined the Reserve Officers' Training Corps and excelled. He felt comfortable within the structure of the military environment and enjoyed the camaraderie of his fellow cadets in the Pershing Rifles Drill Team and Scabbard and Blade Honor Society. After his junior year, he focused on drama with the thought of doing something he enjoyed, before (he assumed) he would have to go off to fight in the Korean War. Jones graduated from the university in 1955 with a Bachelor of Arts, majoring in drama.

=== Military service ===
With the Korean War intensifying, Jones expected to receive orders to active duty and be deployed as soon as he received his commission as a second lieutenant. While he waited for his orders, he worked on the stage crew and acted at the Ramsdell Theatre in Manistee, Michigan. Jones was commissioned in mid-1953, after the Korean War's end, and reported to Fort Benning to attend the Infantry Officers Basic Course. He attended Ranger School and received his Ranger Tab. Jones was assigned to Headquarters and Headquarters Company, 38th Regimental Combat Team. He was initially to report to Fort Leonard Wood, but his unit was instead sent to establish a cold-weather training command at the former Camp Hale near Leadville, Colorado. His battalion became a training unit in the rugged terrain of the Rocky Mountains. Jones was promoted to first lieutenant prior to his discharge.

Jones moved to New York City, where he studied at the American Theatre Wing and worked as a janitor to support himself.

== Career ==
External audio
- James Earl Jones talks with Studs Terkel on WFMT; 1968/02, 49:25, Studs Terkel Radio Archive

=== 1953–1972: Early roles and Shakespeare in the Park ===
Jones began his acting career at the Ramsdell Theatre in Manistee, Michigan. In 1953, he was a stage carpenter, and between 1955 and 1957, he acted and was a stage manager. In his first acting season at the Ramsdell, he portrayed Othello. His early career included an appearance in the ABC radio anthology series Theatre-Five. In 1957, he made his Broadway debut as understudy to Lloyd Richards in the short-lived play, The Egghead, by Molly Kazan. The play ran only 21 performances, but three months later, in January 1958, Jones created the featured role of Edward the butler in Dore Schary's Sunrise at Campobello at the Cort Theatre.

Jones performs Othello's Act I, scene III monologue from Shakespeare's Othello at the White House Evening of Poetry, Music, and the Spoken Word on May 12, 2009

During the early to mid 1960s, Jones acted in various works of William Shakespeare, becoming one of the best known Shakespearean actors of the time. He tackled roles such as Othello and King Lear, Oberon in A Midsummer Night's Dream, Abhorson in Measure for Measure, and Claudius in Hamlet all at Shakespeare in the Park. In 1961, Jones appeared in an Off-Broadway production of The Blacks by Jean Genet, alongside eight subsequently prominent Black actors, including Roscoe Lee Browne, Cicely Tyson, Lou Gossett and others. The New York Public Library has a collection of photographs of this production, including one of Tyson and Jones. During a production of The Merchant of Venice at Shakespeare in the Park, Stanley Kubrick saw George C. Scott play Shylock and Jones portray the Prince of Morocco. Kubrick was there initially to cast Scott in Dr. Strangelove or: How I Learned to Stop Worrying and Love the Bomb (1964), but then considered Jones saying "I'll take the black one too." Jones portrayed young Lt. Lothar Zogg, the B-52 bombardier in the film — this role marked his feature film debut.

Jones played a surgeon and Haitian rebel leader in The Comedians, with Richard Burton, Elizabeth Taylor, and Alec Guinness. In December 1967, Jones starred with Jane Alexander in Howard Sackler's play, The Great White Hope, at the Arena Stage in Washington, D.C. Jones took the role of the talented but troubled boxer "Jack Jefferson", who is based on the real champion Jack Johnson. The play was a major success when it moved to Broadway on October 3, 1968, and was well received, winning the Pulitzer Prize for Drama. Jones won the 1969 Tony Award for Best Actor in a Play and the Drama Desk Award for his performance.

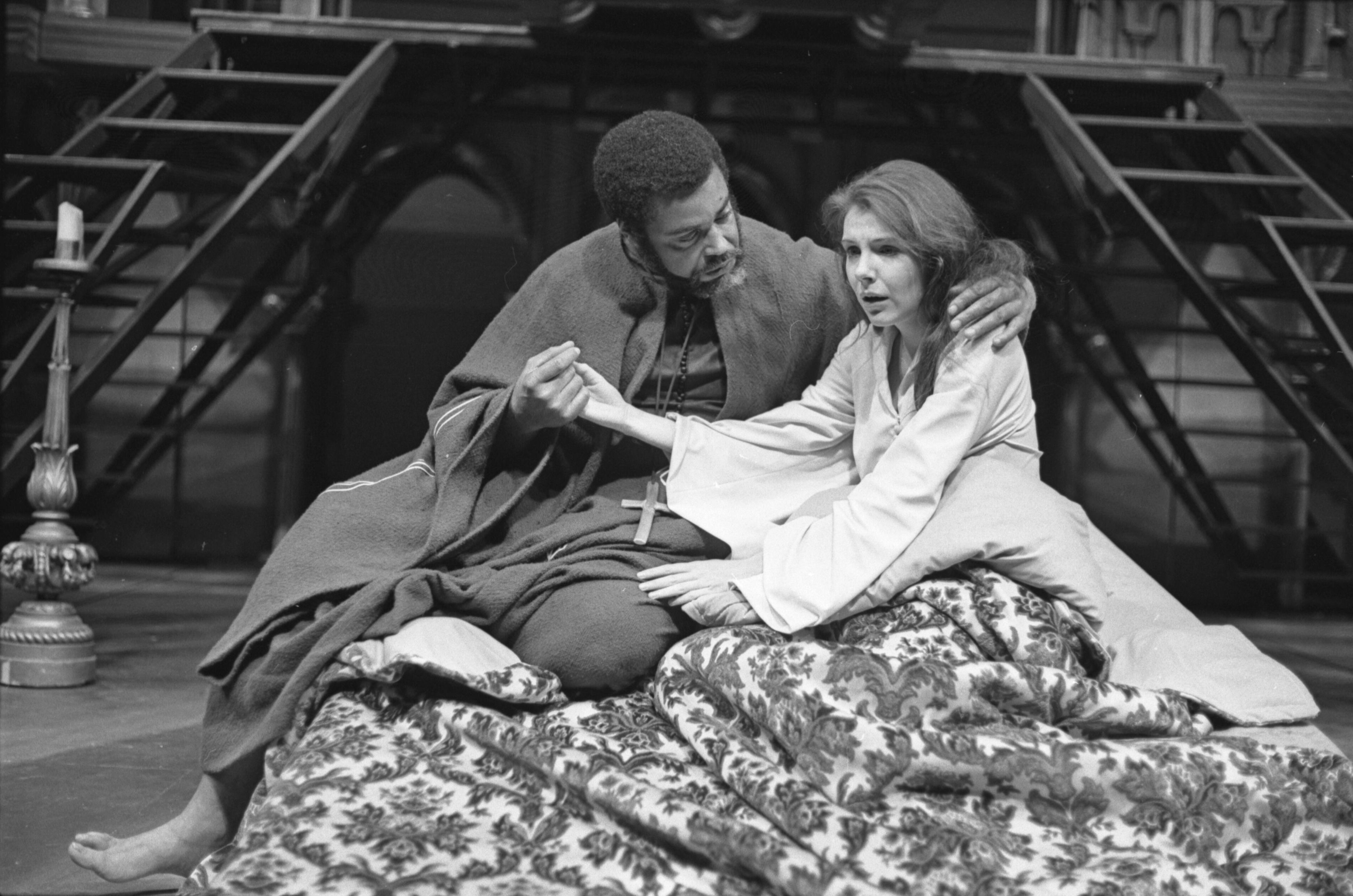
Jones and Jill Clayburgh in a stage production of Othello at the Mark Taper Forum in Los Angeles, California, on April 9, 1971

In 1969, Jones participated in making test films for the children's education series Sesame Street; these shorts, combined with animated segments, were shown to groups of children to gauge the effectiveness of the then-groundbreaking Sesame Street format. As cited by production notes included in the DVD release Sesame Street: Old School 1969–1974, the short that had the greatest impact with test audiences was one showing bald-headed Jones counting slowly to ten. This and other segments featuring Jones were eventually aired as part of the Sesame Street series when it debuted in 1969 and Jones is often cited as the first celebrity guest on that series, although a segment with Carol Burnett was the first actually to be broadcast. He appeared on the soap opera Guiding Light.

In 1970, Jones reunited with Jane Alexander in the film adaptation of The Great White Hope. This was Jones's first leading film role. Jones portrayed boxer Jack Johnson, a role he had previously originated on stage. His performance was acclaimed by critics and earned him an Academy Award nomination for Best Actor. He was the second African-American male performer after Sidney Poitier to be nominated for this award. Variety described his performance declaring, "Jones' recreation of his stage role is an eye-riveting experience. The towering rages and unrestrained joys of which his character was capable are portrayed larger than life." In The Man (1972), Jones starred as a senator who unexpectedly becomes the first African-American president of the United States.

=== 1973–1983: Star Wars and rise to prominence ===
In 1973, Jones played Hickey on Broadway at the Circle in the Square Theatre in a revival of Eugene O'Neill's The Iceman Cometh and starred in the title role of William Shakespeare's King Lear opposite Paul Sorvino, René Auberjonois, and Raul Julia at the New York City Shakespeare Festival in Central Park, which was recorded and broadcast in the PBS Great Performances series the following year. In 1974, Jones played Lennie on Broadway in the 1974 Brooks Atkinson Theatre production of the adaptation of John Steinbeck's novella, Of Mice and Men, with Kevin Conway as George and Pamela Blair as Curley's wife.

In 1974, Jones co-starred with Diahann Carroll in the film Claudine, the story of a woman who raises her six children alone after two failed and two "almost" marriages. The film is a romantic comedy and drama, focusing on systemic racial disparities black families face. It was one of the first major films to tackle themes such as welfare, economic inequality, and the typical marriage of men and women in the African American community during the 1970s. Jones and Carroll received critical acclaim and Golden Globe nominations for their performances. Carroll was nominated for an Academy Award for Best Actress.

In 1977, Jones played Balthazar in the television series Jesus of Nazareth. That same year, he made his debut in his iconic voiceover role as Darth Vader in George Lucas's space opera blockbuster film Star Wars, which he reprised for the sequels The Empire Strikes Back (1980) and Return of the Jedi (1983). Darth Vader was portrayed in costume by David Prowse in the film trilogy, with Jones dubbing Vader's dialogue in post-production because Prowse's strong West Country accent was deemed unsuitable for the role by director George Lucas. At his own request, Jones was uncredited for the release of the first two Star Wars films, though he was credited for the third film and eventually for the first film's 1997 "Special Edition" re-release. As he explained in a 2008 interview:

When Linda Blair did the girl in The Exorcist, they hired Mercedes McCambridge to do the voice of the devil coming out of her. And there was controversy as to whether Mercedes should get credit. I was one who thought no, she was just special effects. So when it came to Darth Vader, I said, no, I'm just special effects. But it became so identified that by the third one, I thought, OK I'll let them put my name on it.

In 1977, Jones also received a Grammy Award for Best Spoken Word Album for Great American Documents. In late 1979, Jones appeared on the short-lived CBS police drama Paris. Jones starred that year in the critically acclaimed TV mini-series sequel Roots: The Next Generations as the older version of author Alex Haley.

=== 1985–1999: Broadway and film roles ===
In 1987, Jones starred in August Wilson's play Fences as Troy Maxson, a middle aged working class father who struggles to provide for his family. The play, set in the 1950s, is part of Wilson's ten-part "Pittsburgh Cycle". The play explores the evolving African-American experience and examines race relations, among other themes. Jones won critical acclaim, earning himself his second Tony Award for Best Actor in a Play. Beside the Star Wars sequels, Jones was featured in several other box office hits of the 1980s: the action-fantasy film Conan the Barbarian (1982), the Eddie Murphy comedy Coming to America (1988), and the sports drama-fantasy Field of Dreams (1989) which earned an Academy Award for Best Picture nomination. He also starred in the independent film Matewan (1987), which dramatized the events of the Battle of Matewan, a coal miners' strike in 1920 in Matewan, a small town in the hills of West Virginia. He received an Independent Spirit Award nomination for his performance.

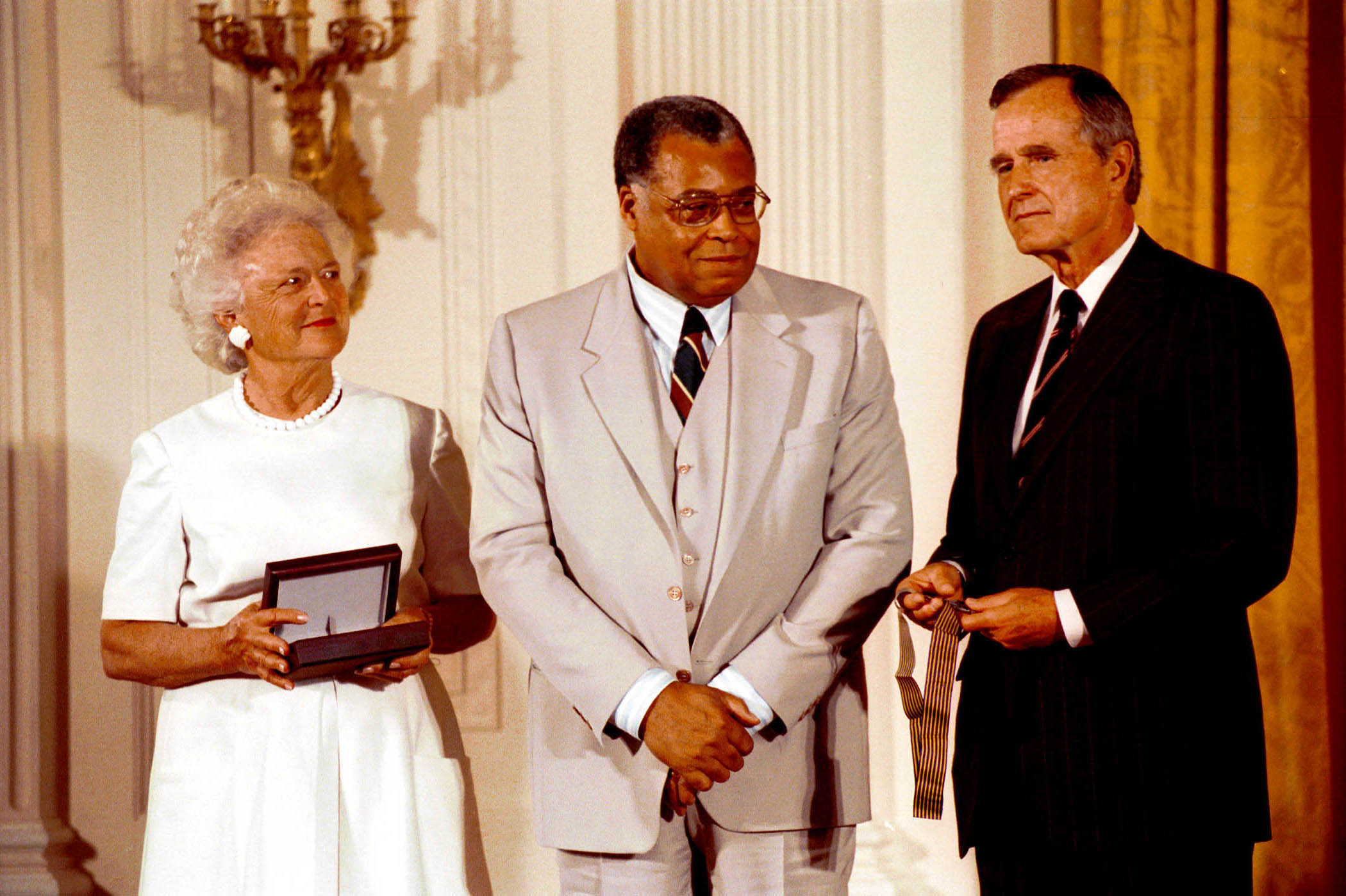
Jones with President George H. W. Bush and First Lady Barbara Bush in 1992, receiving the Medal of Arts

In 1985, Jones lent his bass voice as Pharaoh in the first episode of Hanna-Barbera's The Greatest Adventure: Stories from the Bible. From 1989 to 1992, Jones served as the host of the children's TV series Long Ago and Far Away. Jones appeared in several more successful films during the early-to-mid-1990s, including The Hunt for Red October (1990), Patriot Games (1992), Sneakers (1992), Sommersby (1993), The Sandlot (1993), Clear and Present Danger (1994), and Cry, the Beloved Country (1995). He lent his voice to the role of Mufasa in the 1994 Disney animated film The Lion King. In 1992, Jones was presented with the National Medal of the Arts by President George H. W. Bush. Jones had the distinction of winning two Primetime Emmys in the same year, in 1991 as Best Actor for his role in Gabriel's Fire and as Best Supporting Actor for his work in Heat Wave.

Jones performed voice work for The Simpsons: in the 1990 "Treehouse of Horror" Halloween special and in two other episodes.

Jones played lead characters on television in three series. Gabriel's Fire and a revamped version called Pros and Cons aired on ABC between 1990 and 1992. In both formats of that show, Jones played a former policeman wrongly convicted of murder who, upon his release from prison, becomes a private eye. In 1995, Jones starred in Under One Roof as Neb Langston, a widowed African-American police officer sharing his home with his daughter, his married son and children, and Neb's newly adopted son. The show was a mid-season replacement and lasted six weeks, and earned him another Emmy nomination. He portrayed Thad Green on "Mathnet", a parody of Dragnet that appeared in the PBS program Square One Television. In 1998, Jones starred in the acclaimed syndicated program An American Moment (created by James R. Kirk and Ninth Wave Productions). Jones took over the role filled by Charles Kuralt, upon Kuralt's death.

On July 13, 1993, accompanied by the Morgan State University choir, Jones spoke the U.S. national anthem before the 1993 Major League Baseball All-Star Game in Baltimore. In 1996, he recited the classic baseball poem "Casey at the Bat" with the Cincinnati Pops Orchestra, and on June 1, 2007, he did the same before a Philadelphia Phillies home game. In 1994, he performed the role of "Ebenezer Scrooge" alongside Martin Sheen and Robert MacNeil in a public reading of A Christmas Carol at the Pierpont Morgan Library in New York City, which was broadcast on PBS. Jones appeared in the 1999 Disney animated film Fantasia 2000, introducing the segment The Carnival of the Animals.

External videos
- Jones reciting the National Anthem at the 1993 MLB All Star Game

=== 2000–2009: Career honors and other roles ===
Jones guest-starred in many television shows over the years, including for NBC's Law & Order, and Frasier, ABC's Lois & Clark: The New Adventures of Superman, Fox's medical drama House, and CBS' The Big Bang Theory and Two and a Half Men.

In 2002, Jones received Kennedy Center Honors at the John F. Kennedy Center in Washington, D.C. At the ceremony were fellow honorees Paul Simon, Elizabeth Taylor, and Chita Rivera. President George W. Bush joked, "People say that the voice of the president is the most easily recognized voice in America. Well, I'm not going to make that claim in the presence of James Earl Jones." Those there to honor Jones included Sidney Poitier, Kelsey Grammer, Charles S. Dutton, and Courtney B. Vance.

He voiced the CNN tagline, "This is CNN", as a part of the network's tenth anniversary in 1990. As of 2024, the tagline is still used by CNN. He lent his voice to the opening for NBC's coverage of the 2000 and 2004 Summer Olympics. Jones narrated all 27 books of the New Testament in the audiobook James Earl Jones Reads the New Testament. Although uncredited, Jones's voice is possibly heard as Darth Vader at the conclusion of Star Wars: Episode III – Revenge of the Sith (2005). When specifically asked whether he had supplied the voice, possibly from a previous recording, Jones told Newsday: "You'd have to ask Lucas about that. I don't know."

On April 7, 2005, Jones and Leslie Uggams headed the cast in an African-American Broadway revival version of On Golden Pond, directed by Leonard Foglia and produced by Jeffrey Finn. In February 2008, he starred on Broadway as Big Daddy in a limited-run, all-African-American production of Tennessee Williams' Pulitzer Prize-winning drama Cat on a Hot Tin Roof, directed by Debbie Allen and staged at the Broadhurst Theatre. In November 2009, James reprised the role of Big Daddy in Cat On A Hot Tin Roof at the Novello Theatre in London's West End. That production also starred Sanaa Lathan as Maggie, Phylicia Rashad as Big Mamma, and Adrian Lester as Brick.

In 2009, for his work on film and television, Jones was presented with the Screen Actors Guild Life Achievement Award by Forest Whitaker.

=== 2010–2022: Return to Broadway and final roles ===
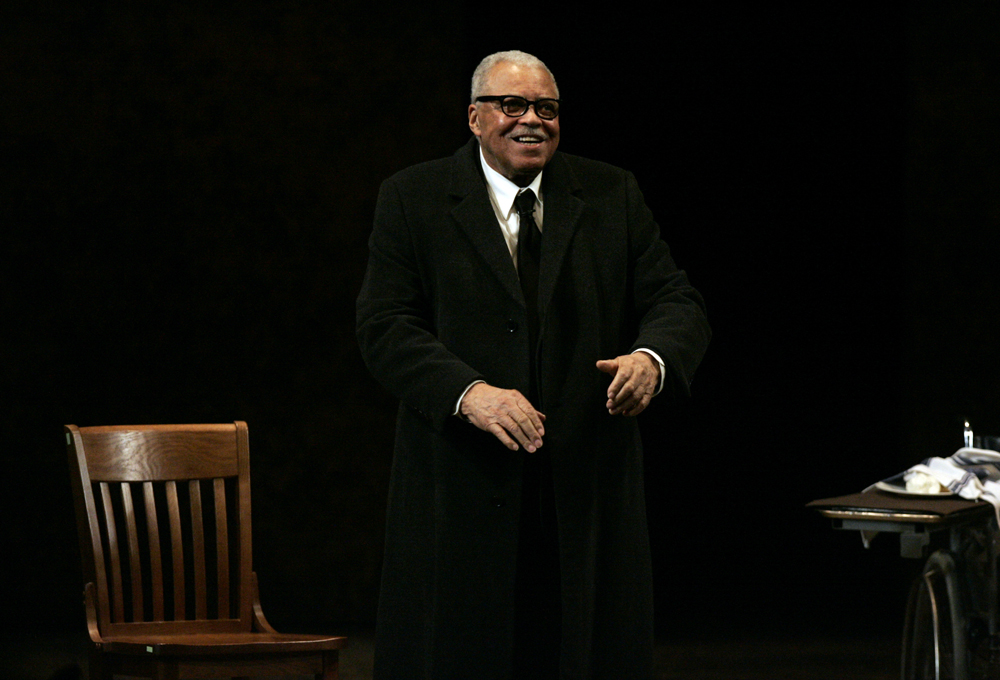
Jones in the 2010 revival of the play Driving Miss Daisy at the Theatre Royal in Sydney

In October 2010, Jones returned to the Broadway stage in Alfred Uhry's Driving Miss Daisy, along with Vanessa Redgrave at the Golden Theatre. In November 2011, Jones starred in Driving Miss Daisy in London's West End, and on November 12 received an honorary Oscar in front of the audience at the Wyndham's Theatre, which was presented to him by Ben Kingsley. In March 2012, Jones played the role of President Art Hockstader in Gore Vidal's The Best Man on Broadway at the Schoenfeld Theatre: he was nominated for a Tony Award for Best Actor in a Play. The play starred Angela Lansbury, John Larroquette (as candidate William Russell), Candice Bergen, Eric McCormack (as candidate Senator Joseph Cantwell), Jefferson Mays, Michael McKean, and Kerry Butler, with direction by Michael Wilson.

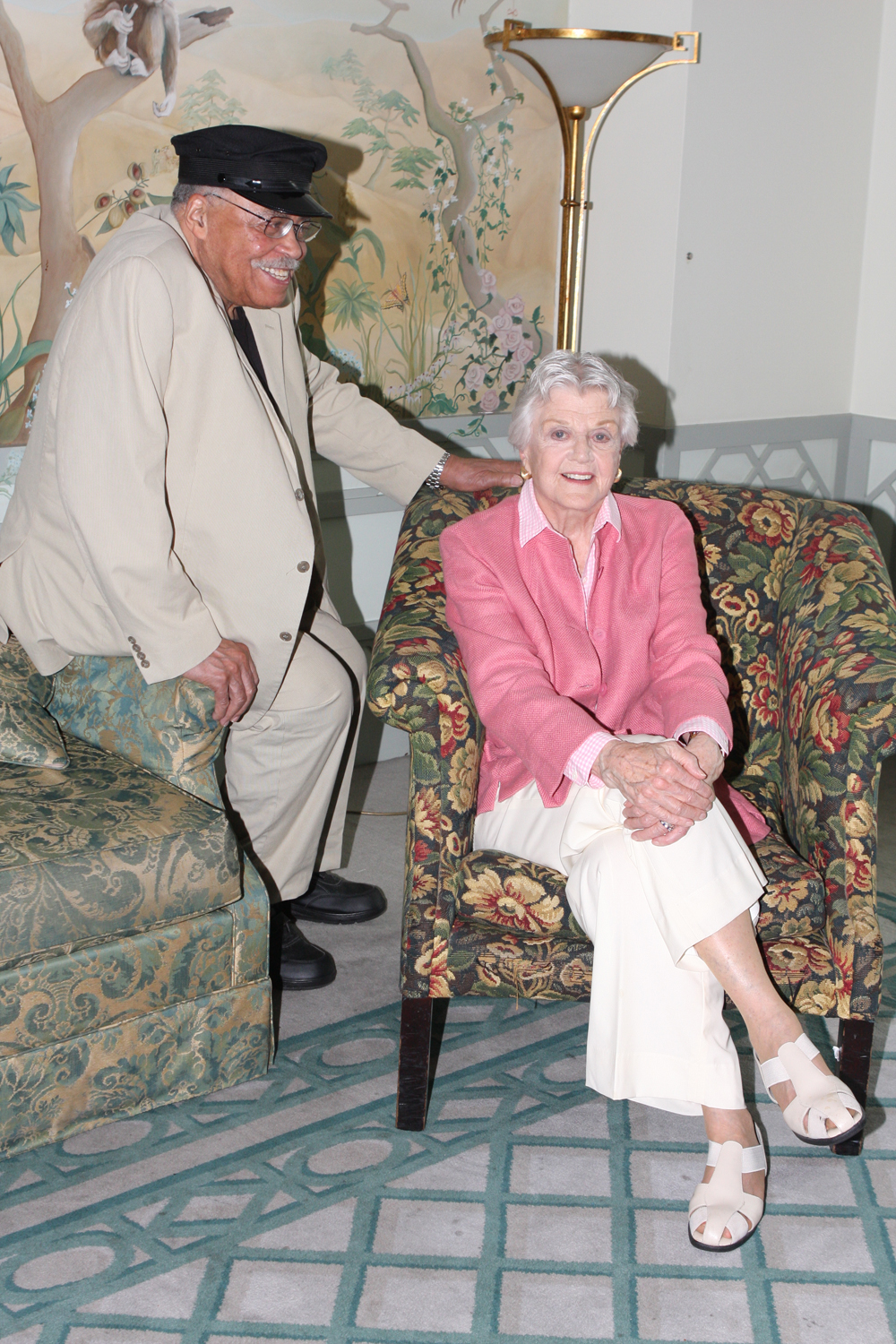
Jones with Dame Angela Lansbury in 2013

In 2013, Jones starred opposite Vanessa Redgrave in a production of Much Ado About Nothing directed by Mark Rylance at The Old Vic, London. From February to June 2013, Jones starred alongside Dame Angela Lansbury in an Australian tour of Driving Miss Daisy. In 2014, Jones starred alongside Annaleigh Ashford as Grandpa in the Broadway revival of the George S. Kaufman comedic play You Can't Take It with You at the Longacre Theatre on Broadway. Ashford received a Tony Award for Best Featured Actress in a Play nomination for her performance. On September 23, 2015, Jones opened in a new revival of The Gin Game opposite Cicely Tyson, at the John Golden Theater, where the play had originally premiered (with Hume Cronyn and Jessica Tandy). The play had a planned limited run of 16 weeks. It closed on January 10, 2016.

In 2013–2014, he appeared with Malcolm McDowell in a series of commercials for Sprint in which the two dramatically recited mundane phone and text-message conversations. In 2015, Jones starred as the chief justice Caleb Thorne in the American drama series Agent X with actress Sharon Stone, Jeff Hephner, Jamey Sheridan, and others. The television series was aired by TNT from November 8 to December 27, 2015, running one season and 10 episodes. Jones reprised his voice role of Darth Vader for the character's appearances in the animated TV series Star Wars Rebels and the live-action film Rogue One: A Star Wars Story (2016), as well as for a three-word cameo in Star Wars: The Rise of Skywalker (2019).

In 2019, he reprised his voice role of Mufasa for the CGI remake of The Lion King, directed by Jon Favreau, in which he was the only original cast member to do so. According to Favreau, Jones's lines from the original film remained mostly the same. Chiwetel Ejiofor, who voiced Mufasa's evil brother Scar in the remake, said that "the comfort of [Jones reprising his role] is going to be very rewarding in taking [the audience] on this journey again. It's a once-in-a-generation vocal quality." Jones reprised the role of King Jaffe Joffer in Coming 2 America (2021), the sequel to Coming to America (1988); this was his final screen credit.

In 2022, his voice was used via Respeecher software for Darth Vader in the Disney+ miniseries Obi-Wan Kenobi. During production, Jones signed a deal with Lucasfilm authorizing archival recordings of his voice to be used in the future to artificially generate the voice of Darth Vader. In September 2022, Jones announced that he would retire from the role of voicing Darth Vader with future voice roles for Vader being created by that means.

== Personal life and death ==
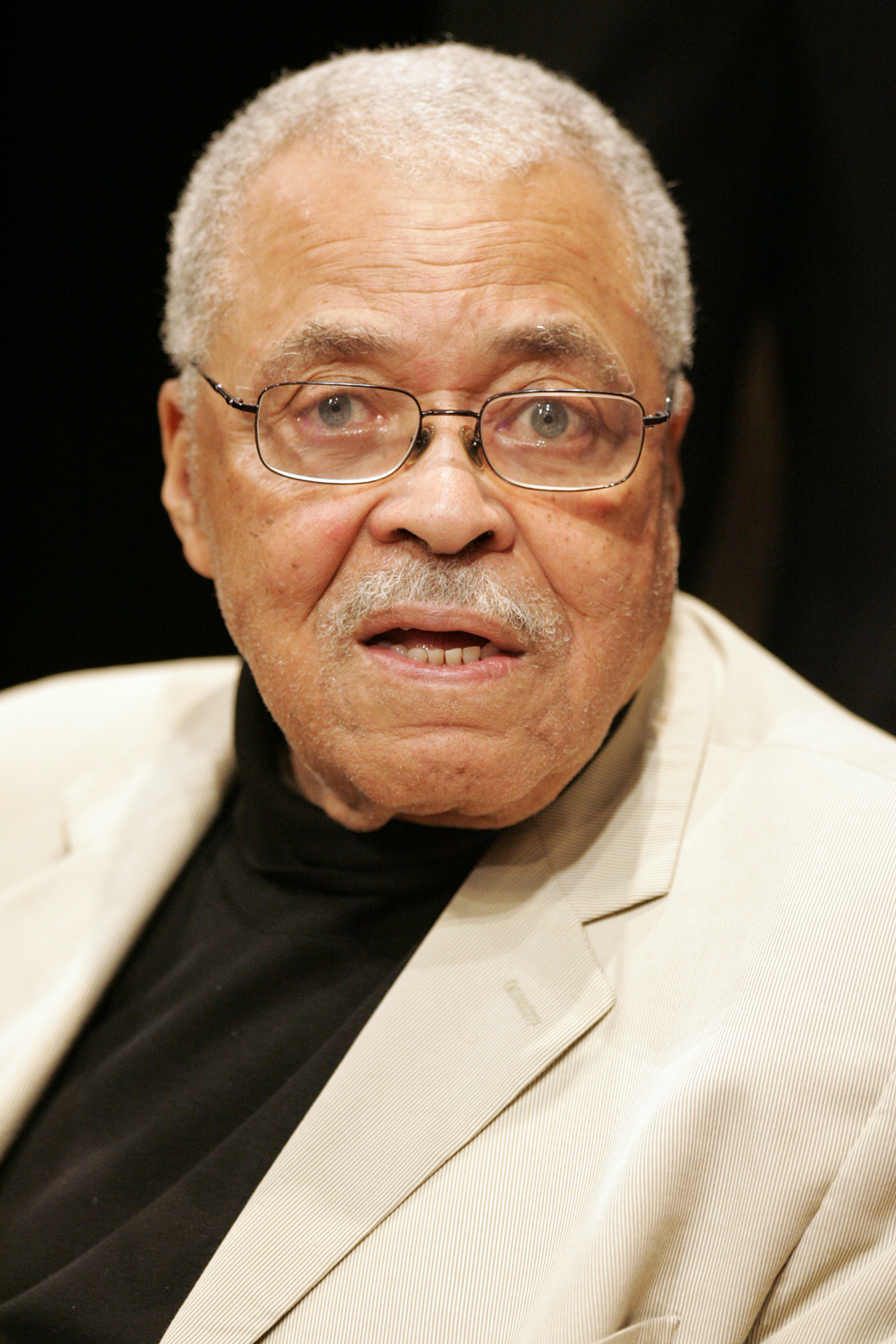
Jones in 2013

=== Marriages and illness ===
In 1968, Jones married actress and singer Julienne Marie, whom he met while performing as Othello to her Desdemona in 1964. They divorced in 1972. In 1982, he married actress Cecilia Hart, who played Desdemona to his Othello shortly after they wed, and with whom he had a son, Flynn Earl Jones. Hart died of complications from ovarian cancer on October 16, 2016, aged 68.

In April 2016, Jones spoke publicly for the first time in nearly 20 years about his long-term health challenge with type 2 diabetes. He was diagnosed in the mid-1990s after his doctor noticed he had fallen asleep while exercising at a gym. Jones was a devout Roman Catholic, having converted during his time in the military. He described his narration of the New Testament as "his greatest honor".

=== Death and tributes ===
Jones died at his home in Pawling, New York, on September 9, 2024, at the age of 93. He died surrounded by his family. In a statement, CNN said that Jones "was the voice of CNN and our brand for many decades, uniquely conveying through speech instant authority, grace, and decorum. That remarkable voice is just one of many things the world will miss about James." Jones's alma mater, the University of Michigan, paid tribute to him by posting a "We Are Michigan" video narrated by Jones on Twitter. The NAACP, SAG-AFTRA, The Public Theater, and MLB also paid tribute to Jones. The Empire State Building in New York City was lit up to resemble Darth Vader. Then-vice president Kamala Harris praised Jones, writing that "[He] used his voice to challenge America's thinking on civil rights and race, and he continued to move our nation forward through his art." Former president Bill Clinton released a statement praising Jones as "a brilliant actor who brought to life some of the most iconic characters ever". Actor Denzel Washington paid tribute to Jones calling him his "hero" adding, "I wasn't going to be as big as him. I wanted to sound like him. He was everything to me as a budding actor. He was who I wanted to be." Numerous members of the entertainment industry paid tribute to Jones including George Lucas, Mark Hamill, Kevin Costner, Arnold Schwarzenegger, Barry Jenkins, Spike Lee, Viola Davis, Whoopi Goldberg, Courtney B. Vance, and Alec Baldwin.

== Reception and legacy ==
Following his death, The New York Times described Jones's career as "a prodigious body of work" and called him "one of America's most versatile actors in a stage, film and television career". The Hollywood Reporter referred to Jones as "one of the most-admired American actors of all time". The Guardian film critic Peter Bradshaw wrote, "like Sidney Poitier or Harry Belafonte or Paul Robeson, [Jones] was an African American actor with a beautiful voice which was the key to his dignity and self-respect as a performer; it was how his characters rose above racism and cruelty", and described Jones as "movie royalty." Academy Award–winning actress Viola Davis said that Jones's career reflected "black excellence".

Jones was recognized as a groundbreaker and pioneer for African Americans for his significant roles on stage and television. In 1965, Jones became one of the first African American actors in a continuing role on a daytime drama acting in As the World Turns. Critic Clive Barnes said that Jones's theater roles were "like a black avenging angel ... Even when corrupted by misery, his presence has an almost moral force to it, and his voice rasps out an agony nearly too personally painful in its nakedness." In 2011, Academy Award-nominated actor Alec Baldwin called Jones "one of the greatest actors in American history." In 2022, the Cort Theatre was renamed after James Earl Jones, becoming the second Broadway venue named after a Black theatrical artist, the first being the August Wilson Theatre named after the playwright August Wilson. The Cort Theatre was the same stage on which Jones made his Broadway debut in 1958.

On May 16, 2025, the online video game Fortnite Battle Royale added a Darth Vader non-playable character, which players can converse with via generative AI modeled after Jones' voice. Fortnite developer Llama Productions LLC (which is wholly owned by Epic Games) received permission from Jones' estate to use his voice and closely collaborated with his family to develop the AI voice model. SAG-AFTRA filed an unfair labor practice charge with the NLRB against Llama Productions in response.

== Acting credits and accolades ==
Jones had an extensive career in film, television, and theater. He started out in film by appearing in the 1964 political satire film Dr. Strangelove as Lt. Lothar Zogg. He then went on to star in the 1970 film The Great White Hope as Jack Jefferson, a role he first played at Washington's Arena Stage in the world premier of Howard Sackler's play of the same name.

On television, he received two Primetime Emmy Awards for his roles in thriller film Heat Wave (1990) and the crime series Gabriel's Fire (1991). He also acted in Jesus of Nazareth (1977), Roots: The Next Generations (1979) and Picket Fences (1994), and Homicide: Life on the Street (1997). Jones's television work includes playing Woodrow Paris in the series Paris between 1979 and 1980. He voiced various characters on the animated series The Simpsons in three separate seasons (1990, 1994, 1998).

Jones's theater work includes numerous Broadway plays, including Sunrise at Campobello (1958–1959), Danton's Death (1965), The Iceman Cometh (1973–1974), Of Mice and Men (1974–1975), Othello (1982), On Golden Pond (2005), Cat on a Hot Tin Roof (2008), and You Can't Take It with You (2014–2015).

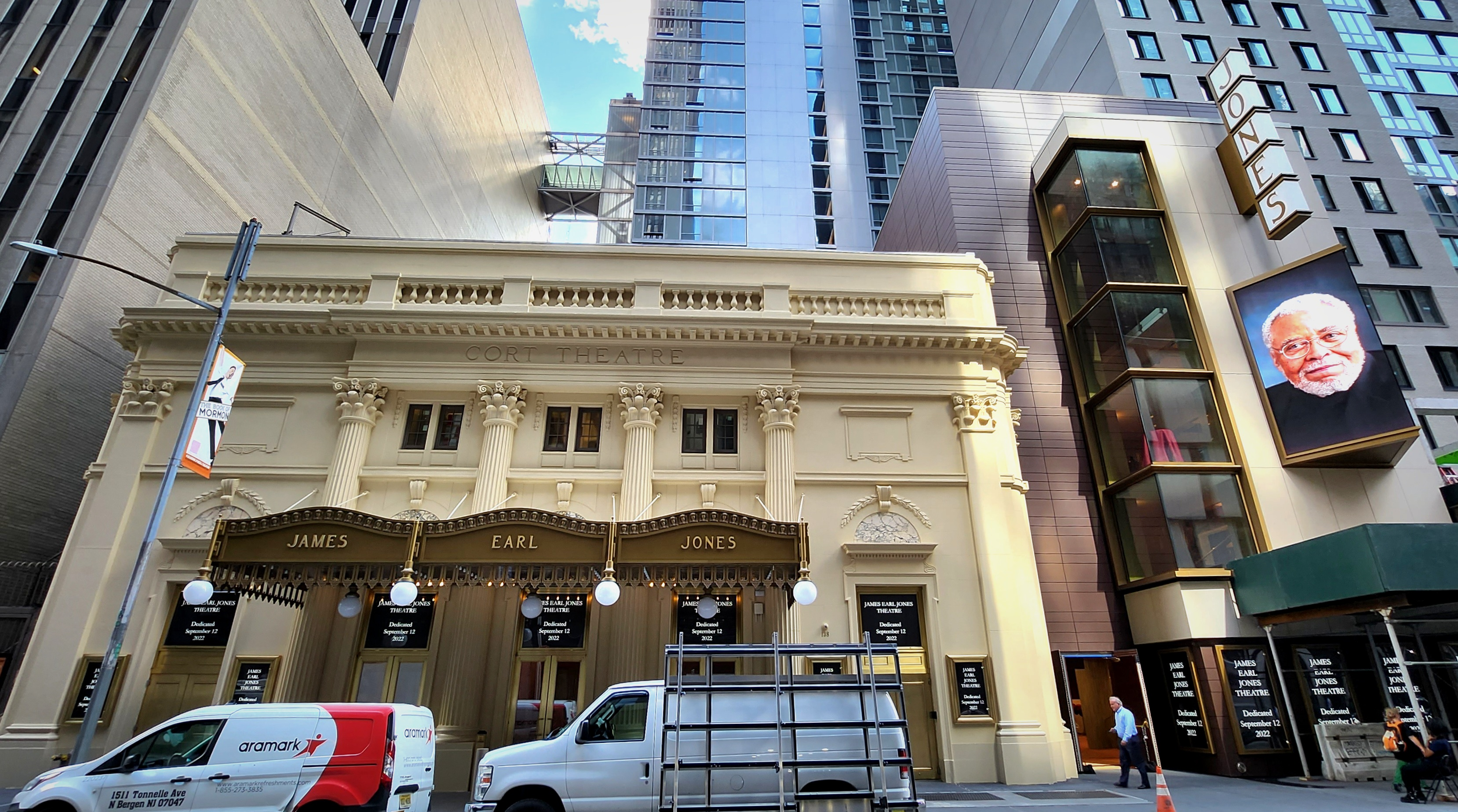
Formerly known as the Cort Theatre, now the James Earl Jones Theatre on Broadway

Jones received two Primetime Emmy Awards, two Tony Awards, and a Grammy Award. He also was the recipient of a Golden Globe Award and the Screen Actors Guild Life Achievement Award. In 2011, he received an Academy Honorary Award. As such, he has been described as being an EGOT, having won all four Emmy, Grammy, Oscar and Tony awards. There is debate as to if the definition of EGOT extends to non-competitive winners such as Jones, Barbra Streisand, Liza Minnelli, and Harry Belafonte.

In 1985, Jones was inducted into the American Theater Hall of Fame He was also the 1987 First recipient of the National Association for Hearing and Speech Action's Annie Glenn Award. In 1991, he received the Common Wealth Award for Outstanding Achievement in the Dramatic Arts. In 1992, he was awarded the National Medal of Arts by George H. W. Bush. He received the 1996 Golden Palm Star on the Palm Springs, California, Walk of Stars. Also in 1996, he was given the Golden Plate Award of the American Academy of Achievement presented by Awards Council member George Lucas. In 2002, he was the featured Martin Luther King Day speaker for Lauderhill, Florida. In 2011, he received the Eugene O'Neill Theater Center Monte Cristo Award Recipient. He also received an Honorary Academy Award on November 12, 2011. He was the 2012 Marian Anderson Award Recipient. Jones won the 2014 Voice Icon Award sponsored by Society of Voice Arts and Sciences at the Museum of the Moving Image. In 2017, he received an Honorary Doctor of Arts from Harvard University. He was honored with a Special Tony Award for Lifetime Achievement in 2017. In 2019, he was honored as a Disney Legend. In March 2022, Broadway's Cort Theatre was renamed the James Earl Jones Theatre in his honor.

== See also ==
- African-American Tony nominees and winners
- List of African-American actors
- List of black Academy Award winners and nominees
- List of actors with Academy Award nominations
- List of Golden Globe winners
- List of black Golden Globe Award winners and nominees
- List of Primetime Emmy Award winners
- List of EGOT winners

== Bibliography ==
- Jones, James Earl; Niven, Penelope (1993). James Earl Jones: Voices and Silences. New York: Charles Scribner's Sons; Maxwell Macmillan International. ISBN 0-684-19513-5. OCLC 317228644.
