= Cecilia Hart =

American actress (1948–2016)

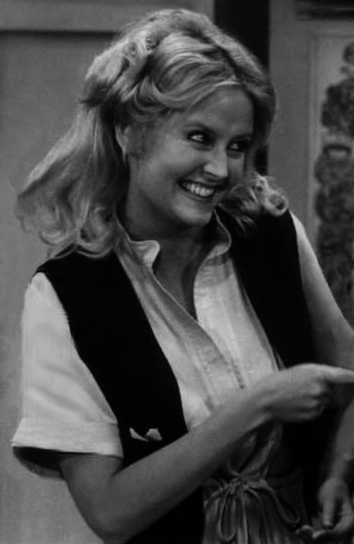
- Hart in 1978
- Born: February 19, 1948; Cheyenne, Wyoming, U.S.
- Died: October 16, 2016 (aged 68)
- Other name: Ceci Jones
- Occupation: Actress
- Years active: 1974–2016
- Spouses: Bruce Weitz (m. 1971; div. 1980); James Earl Jones (m. 1982)
- Children: 1

Cecilia Hart (February 19, 1948 – October 16, 2016), sometimes credited as Ceci Jones, was an American actress who played Stacey Erickson in the CBS police drama Paris, which originally ran from 1979 until 1980. Hart co-starred in the series with her future husband James Earl Jones, to whom she was married until her death in 2016.

== Biography ==
A native of Cheyenne, Wyoming, and the daughter of an Army colonel and his wife, Hart moved to New York City to pursue an acting career. She appeared on Broadway in Tom Stoppard's play Dirty Linen and New-Found-Land from January to March 1977, winning the 1977 Theatre World Award. She appeared on Broadway in The Heiress (1976) and Design for Living (1984), and in Othello as a replacement "Desdemona" in March 1982. Hart starred opposite Paxton Whitehead in five plays before appearing together in Bedroom Farce at the Westport Country Playhouse in 2015. The production ran from August 25, 2015, through September 13, 2015.

== Personal life ==
Hart married actor Bruce Weitz in 1971; they divorced in 1980. She married actor James Earl Jones in 1982; it was also his second marriage. They had one child, and were married until Hart's death. The couple were residents of Pawling, New York.

Hart died from ovarian cancer on October 16, 2016, at the age of 68.

== Filmography ==
Year	Title	Role	Notes
1978	Emergency!	Nancy Halverson	1 episode
1978	The Runaways	Carolyn Roberts	1 episode
1978	Three's Company	Gloria	1 episode
1978	A Woman Called Moses	Susan Broadas	TV miniseries
1979	Quincy, M.E.	Stewardess Jackie Curtis	1 episode
1979–80	Paris	Stacey Erickson	13 episodes
1980	The Silent Lovers	Norma Shea	TV movie
1986	Mr. Sunshine	Janice Hall	11 episodes
1989	The Days and Nights of Molly Dodd	Gail Horner	1 episode
1989	Starting Now	Felicia Kent	TV movie
1989	MacGyver	Kate Hubley	1 episode
1990	Gabriel's Fire	Harley Kovacs	1 episode
1990	Charles in Charge	Elaine Colfax	1 episode
1992	Pros and Cons	Lauren	1 episode
1993; 1996; 1998	Law & Order	Mary Bradley; Marcia Stamell; Greta Singer	3 episodes
2006	The King of Central Park	Lydia	Short film
