= Mr. Sunshine =

Mr. Sunshine may refer to:

- Mr. Sunshine (1986 TV series), an American sitcom series broadcast by ABC
- Mr. Sunshine (2011 TV series), an American sitcom series broadcast by ABC starring Matthew Perry
- Mr. Sunshine (South Korean TV series), a 2018 television series
