= Piotr Dąbkowski =

Entrepreneur

- Born: 1994
- Citizenship: Poland
- Education: University of Cambridge (Master of Philosophy); University of Oxford (BSc, Engineering)
- Occupations: Businessman; entrepreneur
- Known for: Co-founding ElevenLabs

Piotr Dąbkowski (born December 1994) is a Polish entrepreneur and software engineer, and co-founder of ElevenLabs.

== Early life and education ==
Dąbkowski attended the Mikołaj Kopernik High School in Warsaw. He later studied at the University of Oxford, where he obtained a bachelor's degree in engineering, and earned a Master of Philosophy degree from the University of Cambridge in 2017.

== Career ==
He began his career as a software engineer at Opera Software, followed by roles at Google and Tessian.

=== ElevenLabs ===
In 2022, he co-founded ElevenLabs with his high school friend Mati Staniszewski. He serves as the company's Chief Technology Officer, leading the development of AI-based voice technologies, including text-to-speech and voice synthesis systems. In December 2025, it was valued at 11 billion dollars and at 22 billion dollars in October 2026.

Through his work at ElevenLabs, he has contributed to advances in realistic speech generation, particularly systems capable of capturing tone, emotion, and multilingual capabilities.

The company's technology has been adopted across industries such as media, entertainment, and digital content creation, and has been noted for improving the quality of dubbing and narration.

== Recognition ==
In 2024, together with his co-founder, he was included in Forbes 30 Under 30 Europe. In 2025, Dąbkowski was named by Time magazine as one of the 100 most influential people in artificial intelligence.

== Personal life ==
Dąbkowski resides in Poland. His net worth is estimated at $1.8 billion, primarily derived from his ownership stake in ElevenLabs.
