= Mati Staniszewski =

Entrepreneur

- Staniszewski in 2022
- Born: Mateusz Staniszewski; 1995
- Citizenship: Poland
- Education: Imperial College London, (BSc, Mathematics)
- Occupations: Businessman; entrepreneur
- Known for: Co-founding ElevenLabs

Mateusz "Mati" Staniszewski (born 1995) is a Polish entrepreneur and a co-founder of ElevenLabs. His estimated net worth is 1.8 billion USD.

== Early life and education ==
Staniszewski was born in a town outside Warsaw. He moved to the city to go to high school. He finished Copernicus Bilingual High School in Warsaw. He graduated from Imperial College in London with a degree in mathematics.

== Career ==
While in Imperial college, he had his first start-up experience, putting together Mathscon. It was the student led Mathematics conference in the UK, focused on the fun side of math outside university.

He worked at Opera Software, BlackRock, where he joined the Portfolio Analytics Group (PAG) and helped launch the Aladdin Wealth platform, and Palantir Technologies, as a Deployment Strategist, managing large-scale implementation across public and private sectors. In 2025 he joined the board of Klarna, a Swedish fintech company.

=== ElevenLabs ===
In May 2022 he and his high school friend Piotr Dabkowski co-founded ElevenLabs, a company that specializes in developing natural-sounding speech synthesis software using deep learning.

Staniszewski is the CEO. He raised hundreds of millions of dollars from venture firms including Sequoia, Andreessen Horowitz, Salesforce Ventures. In October 2026, ElevenLabs was valued at $22 billion.

Because of its valuation trajectory and the scale of investment it has attached, ElevenLabs is often cited as one of "the Europe's most valuable fastest-growing AI startups", alongside Mistral AI and Lovable, and is considered a significant player in the continent's generative AI ecosystem.

In 2024, together with his co-founder, he was included in Forbes 30 Under 30 Europe. In December 2025 he was on the cover of Forbes.

His net worth is estimated at $1.8 billion, primarily derived from his ownership stake in ElevenLabs.
