= ElevenLabs =

Software company

ElevenLabs Inc.

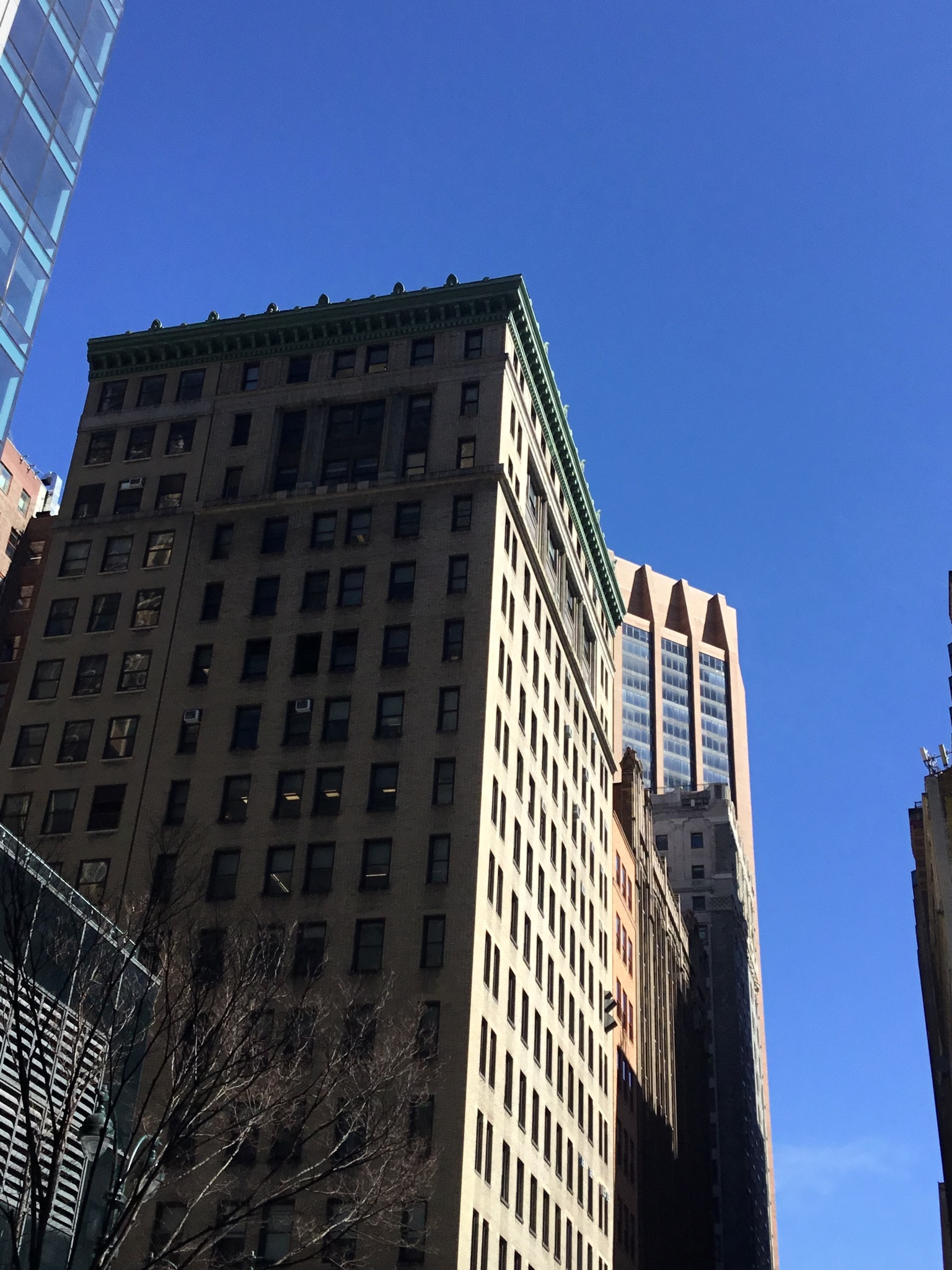
- ElevenLabs New York headquarters on Madison Avenue
- Type: Private
- Industry: Software development; Speech synthesis; Artificial intelligence
- Founded: 2022; 4 years ago
- Founders: Piotr Dąbkowski (CTO); Mati Staniszewski (CEO)
- Headquarters: London; New York City
- Products: ElevenAgents; ElevenCreative; ElevenAPI; Eleven v3; Eleven Music; Scribe v2 Realtime; Agent Workflows; Productions; 11ai
- Services: Speech processing; Software agent; Virtual assistant
- Number of employees: 400 (2026)
- Website: elevenlabs.io

ElevenLabs Inc. is a software company that specializes in developing natural-sounding speech synthesis software using deep learning. It was founded in 2022 by Polish entrepreneurs Piotr Dąbkowski and Mateusz Staniszewski. ElevenLabs is legally incorporated in the US. It is based in London and also has offices in New York City, Warsaw and San Francisco.

== Name etymology ==
The name ElevenLabs derives from the English word eleven. The number refers to November 11, the date of Poland’s National Independence Day (the eleventh day of the eleventh month). The element Labs refers to the English word laboratories and indicates the company’s research and development profile.

== History ==
ElevenLabs was co-founded in 2022 by Piotr Dąbkowski, an ex-Google machine learning engineer and Mati Staniszewski, an ex-Palantir deployment strategist. Both were raised in Poland, and their inspiration for founding ElevenLabs reportedly came from watching inadequately dubbed American films.

Dąbkowski and Staniszewski initially considered different funding options, including the possibility of collaborating with a startup accelerator. In January 2023 they revealed having secured a $2 million pre-seed round. The startup's specialization in AI voice intelligence, a still-emerging field in Europe, played a significant role in attracting investors. The pre-seed funding was primarily led by Credo Ventures, and joined by Concept Ventures.

In January 2023, ElevenLabs publicly released its beta platform.

In June 2023, ElevenLabs raised a $19 million Series A funding round at a valuation of about $100 million. The funding round was co-led by the venture capital firm Andreessen Horowitz, former GitHub CEO Nat Friedman, and entrepreneur Daniel Gross. It also saw participation from prominent individuals such as SV Angel, Mike Krieger (co-founder of Instagram), Brendan Iribe (co-founder of Oculus), Mustafa Suleyman (co-founder of Deepmind), and Tim O'Reilly (founder of O'Reilly Media). It was also announced that Andreessen Horowitz would be joining ElevenLabs' board.

On January 22, 2024, ElevenLabs raised an additional $80 million in Series B funding raising the total valuation of the company to $1.1 billion. The funding round was led by Andreessen Horowitz, Friedman, Gross, and Sequoia Capital. Additionally, the company announced a series of new products, including their Voice Marketplace, AI Dubbing Studio, and mobile app.

In the lead-up to the January 2024 New Hampshire Democratic primary, AI-generated robocalls purportedly from Joe Biden encouraging voters to skip voting on the day of the primary were sent to thousands of residents. The New Hampshire attorney general's office launched an investigation into the incident and linked it to a company based in Texas, with audio experts concluding the call was made using ElevenLabs. In response to the incident, CEO Mati Staniszewski stated that the company was “dedicated to preventing the misuse of audio AI tools” but provided no comment on specific incidents.

On January 30, 2025, ElevenLabs announced their $180 million Series C funding raising the total valuation of the company to $3.3 billion. The round was co-led by a16z and ICONIQ Growth with additional new investors NEA, World Innovation Lab (WiL), Valor, Endeavor Catalyst Fund and Lunate and brought on strategic investors including Deutsche Telekom, LG Technology Ventures, HubSpot Ventures, NTT Docomo Ventures, and RingCentral Ventures.

In September 2025, ElevenLabs opened an employee tender offer, allowing staff who had worked at the company for at least a year to sell shares at a $6.6 billion valuation. It completed another tender offer for staff at a $22B valuation in September 2026.

On February 4, 2026, ElevenLabs announced that it raised $500 million at an $11 billion valuation, as it eyes a potential IPO.

In March 2026, ElevenLabs pledged to committing $1 billion in free restoration voice technology to 1 million people living with permanent voice loss.

In November 2026, ElevenLabs acquired Japanese AI voice company Kotoba Technologies.

== Products ==
Example dialogue generated with Eleven v3. Prompt: Check this out... In just a sec, I'm gonna speak with a different accent. And just between you and me (WHISPERS) I don't really know how. (CHUCKLES) But ok... first let's change it up... (AUSTRALIAN ACCENT) so that I can fit in with the locals in Melbourne when I visit next month! (LAUGHS HARD) Woooo! yeah man, this - is - sick. Ok, let's try a different one, see if you can guess... (FRENCH ACCENT) My love... eez like a red, red rose.

ElevenLabs is primarily known for its browser-based, AI-assisted text-to-speech software, Speech Synthesis, which can produce lifelike speech by synthesizing vocal emotion and intonation, and now Conversational AI, a developer platform for launching interactive voice agents. The company states that its models are trained to interpret the context in the text, and adjust the intonation and pacing accordingly. It uses advanced algorithms to analyze the contextual aspects of text, aiming to detect emotions like anger, sadness, happiness, or alarm, which enables the system to understand the user's sentiment, resulting in achieving a more realistic and human-like inflection. The startup is in the process of patenting this technology. On its beta site, users can submit text and generate audio files from a selection of default voices. Paying users are given the ability to upload custom voice samples to create new vocal styles using the company's voice cloning tool.

=== Voice Library ===
Voice Library is the company's feature for sharing unique voice profiles created using their Voice Design technology. These pre-designed voice profiles allow users to select a voice that best suits their needs, rather than creating one from scratch. There are now more than 1,000 community-created voices in the library. Another tool called VoiceLab allows users to clone voices from just a few short snippets of audio and can create entirely new synthetic voices.

=== AI Speech Classifier ===
On June 20, 2023, ElevenLabs released an AI recognition tool called the AI Speech Classifier, which it claims is the first of its kind. The tool is accessible through an API and designed to determine if an uploaded audio sample originates from ElevenLabs' proprietary AI technology. The company has expressed its intention to collaborate with other AI developers in creating a universal detection system that could be adopted industry-wide.

=== Projects ===
In July 2023, ElevenLabs announced "Projects", a tool for creating long-form spoken content such as audiobooks and dialogue segments with contextually-aware synthetic or custom voices. The tool was released in September. In August, ElevenLabs expanded its voice generation capabilities to 28 languages. Using an in-house AI model, it automatically detects languages like Korean, Dutch, and Vietnamese, allowing for "emotionally rich" multilingual speech generation. The company also announced that its technology had officially exited its beta phase.

=== ElevenReader ===
In August 2024, ElevenLabs released ElevenReader, an app that converts textual content (such as PDFs, eBooks or articles) to audio. The app was made available on iOS, Android, and the web.

=== AI Dubbing and voice products ===
In October 2023, ElevenLabs presented "AI Dubbing", a tool that is able to translate speech into more than 20 languages. The feature is capable of preserving the speaker's original voice, emotions, and intonation, by employing proprietary methods to handle tasks like noise removal, speaker differentiation, transcription, and synchronization of translated speech with the original audio.

In May 2024, ElevenLabs shared samples from their text-to-music model, which became available for public use in July 2025. In June 2024, ElevenLabs released the ElevenLabs Reader App on iOS and Android which allows users to listen to articles, PDFs, and ePubs with AI Voices on their phone. In July 2024, ElevenLabs released "Voice Isolator" which removes background noise from audio. In November 2024, they released Conversational AI, a developer platform for launching interactive voice agents. In February 2025, the company introduced a new platform that enables authors to create and publish AI-generated audiobooks directly on its Reader app. Later that month, the company released Scribe, a speech-to-text model that transcribes audio with character-level timestamps and speaker diarization with industry-leading word error rate according to internal benchmarks and third party tests from Artificial Analysis.

In June 2025, ElevenLabs released Eleven v3, a new text-to-speech model that supports more than 70 languages, natural multi-speaker dialogue, and audio tags like [excited], [whispers], and [sighs].

=== Eleven Music ===
In August 2025, ElevenLabs launched Eleven Music, an AI music generator that enables users to generate studio-grade music from natural language prompts. The platform was developed in collaboration with record labels, publishers, and artists, and is cleared for commercial use across various applications including film, television, podcasts, social media videos, advertisements, and gaming. Eleven Music provides control over genre, style, and structure, allowing users to create tracks with or without vocals in multiple languages including English, Spanish, German, and Japanese. The platform features advanced editing capabilities that enable users to modify individual sections of songs or entire compositions. Built with a proprietary AI music model developed by ElevenLabs, the system can generate real-time music with seamless genre and instrument blending while closely following complex, multi-layered prompts for lyrics, key, and tempo specifications.

=== ElevenAgents ===
In February 2026, ElevenLabs released Expressive Mode in ElevenAgents. Expressive Mode combines two updates: Eleven v3 Conversational - a new emotionally intelligent, context-aware text-to-speech model, built on Eleven v3 and optimized for real-time dialogue and a new turn-taking system for better-timed responses with fewer interruptions.

== Reception ==
Following its launch in January 2023, ElevenLabs gained rapid momentum and was commended for its voice output quality, fast generation times, and a "generous free tier". It has also been praised for its ability to accurately pronounce names with unique or uncommon pronunciations, addressing a common shortcoming in similar tools that often cater primarily to Western names. The company reached over one million registered users between its launch and June 2023.

In April 2025, ElevenLabs was featured in the Forbes AI 50 list.

ElevenLabs was criticized after users were able to abuse its software to generate controversial statements in the vocal style of celebrities, public officials, and other famous individuals, particularly attracting attention after users on 4chan used the tool to share hateful messages.

== Culture ==
ElevenLabs’ culture includes involvement in media and creative projects alongside its core technology development. The company released the album The Next, a project built around AI-generated vocals, which involved collaborations with artists, producers, and developers working with synthetic voice tools. The album contains songs with varying levels of AI and human input, and the earnings from its streams go back to all participating artists.

In addition to music, ElevenLabs produced the documentary series 11 Voices, which premiered at SXSW in 2026 and features interviews with individuals working across artificial intelligence, audio production, and related fields, addressing topics such as voice synthesis, ethics, and creative practice.

== See also ==
- 15.ai, a research project using AI for text-to-speech using voices of popular fictional characters
- Respeecher, a company performing speech-to-speech voice conversion
- Speechify, an app and browser extension for text-to-speech conversion
