= Sesame Street: Old School =

Sesame Street: Old School is the title of a series of DVD releases produced by Sesame Workshop, featuring episodes from the early years of the PBS series, Sesame Street, plus highlights from that era. The first volume, 1969–1974, was released by Sony Wonder in Region 1 (North America) on October 24, 2006. The second volume, 1974–1979, was released by Genius Entertainment on November 6, 2007. The third volume, 1979–1984, was released by Warner Home Video on November 6, 2012. Each set featured three discs in a box set, with the exception of the third set, which instead features two discs.

The first DVD set was also released by Abbey Home Media in the United Kingdom on October 27, 2008, coded Region 2, and rated "U" by the BBFC. It has not been announced when the second volume will be released in the U.K.

While most DVD releases by Sesame Workshop focus on segments from more recent years of Sesame Street, these DVDs are aimed primarily at adult viewers who grew up watching the series in the 1970s and 1980s and even comes with a warning for adults only on the package.

Among the most notable extra segments is one of James Earl Jones counting to 10 (which was actually created before production of the series officially began (it was a test film shown to children to gauge effectiveness of the format)), and Jesse Jackson leading a group of children in reciting his poem, "I Am - Somebody".

Given the format of Sesame Street, many of the animated and Muppets segments featured in this set, especially those seen in the first episode, would be replayed on the series well into the 1990s.

Included on Volume 1 is a half-hour promotional film from early 1969 hosted by Muppet creator Jim Henson's trademark characters Kermit the Frog and Rowlf the Dog that was created to sell the idea to potential sponsors. The second set features one of the test pilots that were shown to groups of Philadelphia children in July 1969. The third set features commentary on Episode 1316 by Sonia Manzano, an interview with Caroll Spinney, behind-the-scenes footage, an excerpt about Mr. Hooper's death from Episode 1839, and a narration of an on-screen version of the 1976 book; How to Be a Grouch, by Caroll Spinney.

On the first release, each episode is preceded by a newly made animated segment introducing the episode, featuring "Bob" (a blobbly-type human not related to Bob McGrath, done in the style of the era) telling his memories of the show, and how it developed; notably, the segment that precedes the first episode from November 1969 includes Bob reading a disclaimer warning parents that the DVD is aimed at adults and that these early episodes no longer necessarily reflect the most commonly accepted practices in preschool programming. This disclaimer is also used on Volume 2, where each episode opens and closes with new animated segments featuring the anthropomorphic typewriter created by Jeff Hale.

== Alterations ==
Several segments were replaced on the DVD versions of the episodes because of rights issues, including a musical number by Stevie Wonder produced specifically for the show, 123 Sesame Street (this musical segment, cut from the end of the 1973 season premiere, was a rerun segment from an earlier episode from that year).
