= I Am – Somebody =

Poem recited by Jesse Jackson

"I Am – Somebody" is a poem often recited by Reverend Jesse Jackson, and was used as part of PUSH-Excel, a program designed to motivate black students.

A similar poem was written in the early 1940s by Reverend William Holmes Borders, Sr., senior pastor at the Greater Wheat Street Baptist Church and civil rights activist in Atlanta, Georgia.

== History ==
A recording of Jackson delivering the poem appears on the album I Am Somebody published on Respect Records TAS-2601 in 1971.

Jackson recited the free verse poem on Sesame Street in 1972 (taped in February, aired in May). It was geared to fulfilling Sesame Street’s initial curriculum for serving under-privileged city children, as well as promoting cultural understanding. On Sesame Street, lines of "I am/Somebody" or "But I am/Somebody" were recited in a call and response fashion by Jackson and the children. During the segment, children of multiple races were gathered on the Sesame Street set and led by Jackson in the poem. This performance is included on the 2006 DVD release Sesame Street: Old School.

"I Am – Somebody" was also recited by Jackson, with the assembled crowd at Los Angeles Coliseum for the famous Wattstax Music Festival on August 20, 1972.

It also appears in When We Were Kings, a 1996 documentary examining the historic 1974 Rumble in the Jungle boxing match between Muhammad Ali and George Foreman in the Democratic Republic of the Congo (which was still known as Zaire at that time). It was performed with band as part of a concert preceding the bout that was said to be the finest collection of African American entertainers ever assembled at that time.

The poem inspired the title of a 1998 book called I Am Somebody! (ISBN 0-516-26133-9) by Charnan Simon, but did not print the poem itself.

== Legacy ==
About a month after Dr. Seuss died in 1991, Saturday Night Live paid tribute to the book Green Eggs and Ham, by having Jackson appear on the "Weekend Update" segment and recite it in the same oratative fashion he performs the poem.

The poem was recited in a somewhat different form in what sounds like a speech by Jackson sampled on the 1973 funk single "Same Beat" by The J.B.'s. The J.B.'s titled an album and track Damn Right I Am Somebody the following year.

The phrase has become so much of a calling card for Jackson that he yells it in a cameo in the movie Undercover Brother.

"I Am – Somebody" also inspired a similarly titled song on Carlos Santana's 2005 album, "All That I Am", which featured the American rapper will.i.am of The Black Eyed Peas.

"I Am Somebody" is a song by the hip-hop group Jurassic 5 on the album Power In Numbers, which samples the poem numerous times.

A recording of "I Am – Somebody" is on the song "Can't Hold Us Back" on Paris Presents: Hard Truth Soldiers by Dead Prez, Kam, Paris and Public Enemy.

Primal Scream sampled the Wattstax concert speech heavily for the track "Come Together" on their 1991 album Screamadelica.
