= Paris (1979 TV series) =

- Genre: Police procedural
- Created by: Steven Bochco
- Starring: James Earl Jones; Hank Garrett; Cecilia Hart; Jake Mitchell; Frank Ramírez; Michael Warren; Lee Chamberlin
- Country of origin: United States
- Original language: English
- No. of episodes: 13 (2 unaired)

Production
- Executive producer: Steven Bochco
- Producer: Edward DeBlasio
- Running time: 44 minutes
- Production company: MTM Enterprises

Original release
- Network: CBS
- Release: September 29, 1979 – January 15, 1980

Paris is an American police procedural that aired on the CBS television network from September 29, 1979, to January 15, 1980. The show is notable as the first appearance of actor James Earl Jones in a television lead role. Paris was created and executive produced by Steven Bochco, and produced by Edward DeBlasio for MTM Enterprises.

== Plot ==
Los Angeles Police Captain Woody Paris (Jones) is the supervisor of a team of rookie detectives, led by Sergeant Stacy Erickson (Cecilia Hart) and including officers Charlie Bogart (Jake Mitchell), Ernesto Villas (Frank Ramirez), and Willie Miller (Michael Warren). Hank Garrett portrayed Deputy Chief Jerome Bench, Paris' superior, and, in an unusual turn for police dramas of that era, Paris' home and off-duty life was given considerable attention, with Lee Chamberlin portraying his wife Barbara. Paris additionally moonlighted as a professor of criminology at a local university.

== Reception ==
Although Paris was critically acclaimed for its portrayal of the tension between the title character and his often impetuous underlings, it failed to attract viewers due to CBS scheduling it in one of the worst timeslots on a weekly schedule: Saturdays at 10 p.m. CBS moved the show to Tuesdays in the same timeslot in a futile attempt to improve ratings, and the show was canceled in 1980 after one season of thirteen episodes, two of which were not broadcast.

Jones married former costar Hart two years after Paris' cancellation, and they remained together until her death in 2016.

== Cast ==
- James Earl Jones as Detective Capt. Woodrow "Woody" Paris
- Hank Garrett as Deputy Chief Jerome Bench
- Cecilia Hart as Sgt. Stacey Erickson
- Jake Mitchell as Det. Charlie Bogart
- Frank Ramírez as Det. Ernie Villas
- Michael Warren as Det. Willie Miller
- Lee Chamberlin as Barbara Paris

== Episodes ==
No.	Title	Directed by	Written by	Original release date
1	"Paris"	Jackie Cooper	Steven Bochco	September 29, 1979
Series pilot: Captain Woodrow Paris is brought in to solve the murder of a prominent councilman's wife. With Vic Morrow, Barbara Babcock, Candy Brown, Kiel Martin, Frank Marth.
2	"Dear John"	Arnold Laven	Steven Bochco	October 6, 1979
After his mother is crippled by muggers, a rookie cop tries to take the law into his own hands. With Lawrence Hilton-Jacobs, Harold J. Stone, Danny Glover, Clinton Derricks-Carroll, Taurean Blacque.
3	"Pawn"	Georg Stanford Brown	Edward DeBlasio	October 13, 1979
Paris finds that identifying a killer-rapist is a lot easier than coming up with the evidence to convict him. With Wendy Phillips, David-James Carroll, Joan Darling, Stephen Pearlman, Irene Tedrow.
4	"Friends and Enemies"	Alex March	Edward DeBlasio & Michael Kozoll	October 20, 1979
Paris investigates the slaying of an unarmed restaurant owner by a policeman. With Rudy Ramos, Mark Slade, Alice Hirson, Barrie Youngfellow, Rosana Soto, Essex Smith, Fred Beir.
5	"Once More for Free"	Alexander Singer	Burton Armus	October 27, 1979
Differing police philosophies cause conflict between Paris and his old mentor in the case of an elusive drug dealer. With Michael Conrad, Dan Hedaya, Victor Brandt, Lee Paul.
6	"Dead Men Don't Kill"	Jerry McNeely	Steven Bochco	December 4, 1979
In a desperate effort to save a possibly innocent man on death row, Paris searches for evidence linking a suave robber to a six-year-old cop killing. With Georg Stanford Brown, Marya Small, Jordan Clarke, Stephen Pearlman, Robert Englund.
7	"Burnout"	Alf Kjellin	Del Reisman	December 11, 1979
Paris finds himself contending with another cop when their cases intersect. He also suspects that something is up with the man and has to decide if he should take action against him. With Bruce Weitz, James B. Sikking, Ellen Geer, Herb Braham, David Himes, Vahan Moosekian, Abel Franco.
8	"Decisions"	Jack Starrett	Irving Pearlberg	December 18, 1979
Paris' conscience is deeply troubled when an innocent man is killed by hijackers in the course of an undercover investigation. With John Quade, Sandy McPeak, James Oliver, Mary Gregory, Jon Terry.
9	"The Price Is Right"	Georg Stanford Brown	Jackson Gillis	January 1, 1980
With a juicy political appointment on the line, Paris persists in his investigation of crooks who are driving elderly people from their beachfront homes. With Ron Feinberg, Granville Van Dusen, Don Gordon, Sally Kemp, Frank Ronzio.
10	"The Ghost Maker"	Bruce Paltrow	Burton Armus	January 8, 1980
Paris tries to prosecute a killer, who is the star witness in a gangland trial and thus is being protected by the government. This brings him into conflict with several federal agents. With Nicolas Coster, James Gallery, Lee Wallace, Ben Piazza.
11	"Fitz's Boys"	Alf Kjellin	Larry Alexander & Burton Armus	January 15, 1980
Paris becomes an honorary Irishman when he and his squad investigate thefts from the docks and the suspicious death of an old stevedore. With Tom Clancy, Joe Penny, Jane Connell, Laurence Lau Jr., John P. Ryan, Roger E. Mosley.
12	"Pay the Two Bucks"	Alan Rachins	David Solomon	Unaired
When a good friend is framed for murder due to an extortionist's plot, Paris works to exonerate the innocent man. With Joe Santos, Ken Swofford, Jonathan Frakes, Anne Sward, Karlene Crockett.
13	"America the Beautiful"	Victor Lobl	Burton Armus	Unaired
Paris finds himself in the middle of a violent confrontation between a neighborhood association and American Nazis on the eve of a Fourth of July rally. With Paul Koslo, Dolph Sweet, Ed Harris, Betsy Slade.

== Sources ==
Total Television: A Comprehensive Guide to Programming from 1948 to the Present, Alex McNeil, New York: Penguin, revised ed., 1984.

== Bibliography ==
- Tim Brooks and Earle Marsh, The Complete Directory to Prime Time Network and Cable TV Shows 1946–Present, Ninth edition (New York: Ballantine Books, 2007) ISBN 978-0-345-49773-4
